= 2014 Acrobatic Gymnastics World Championships – Women's group qualification =

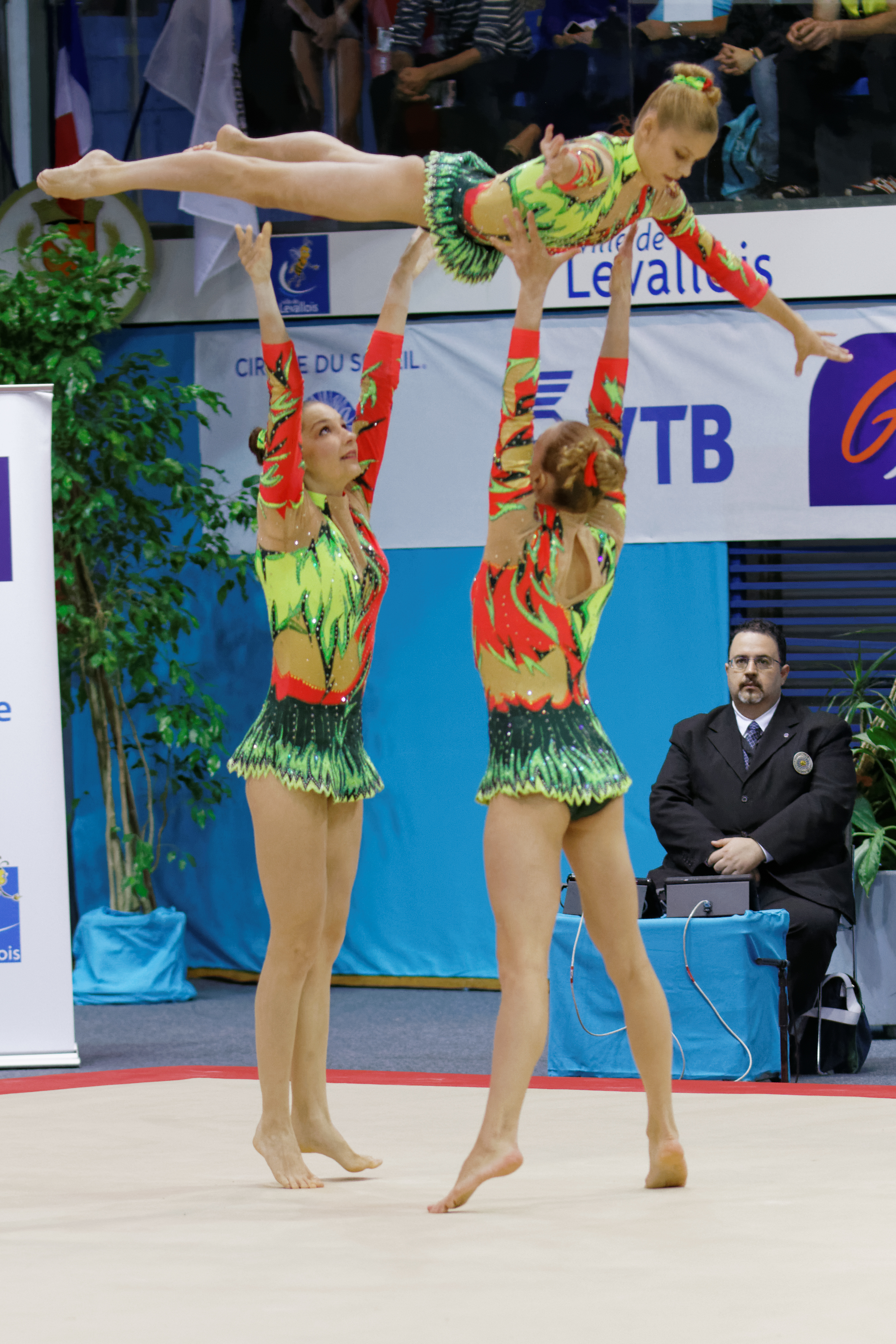
Belarus trio

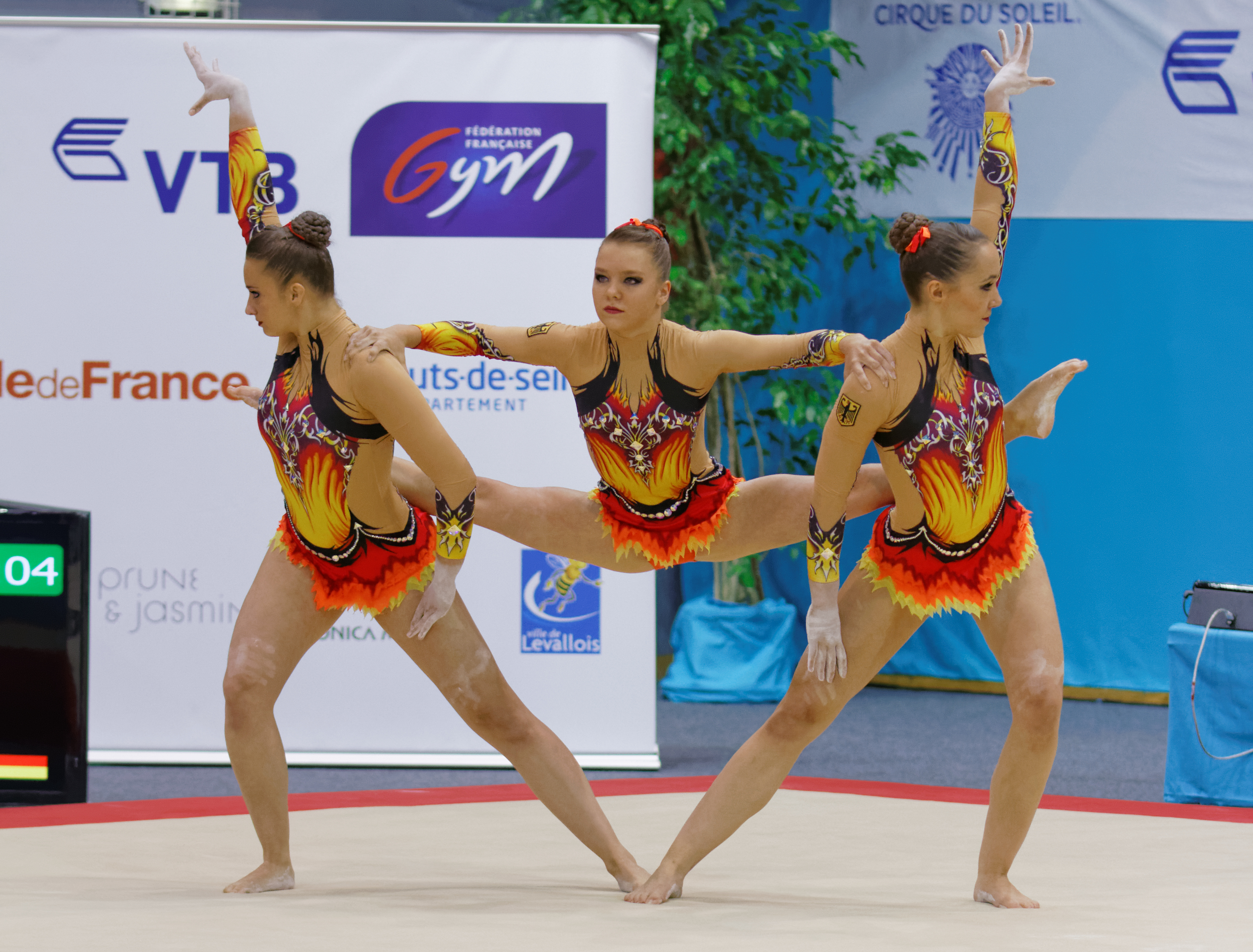
Germany trio

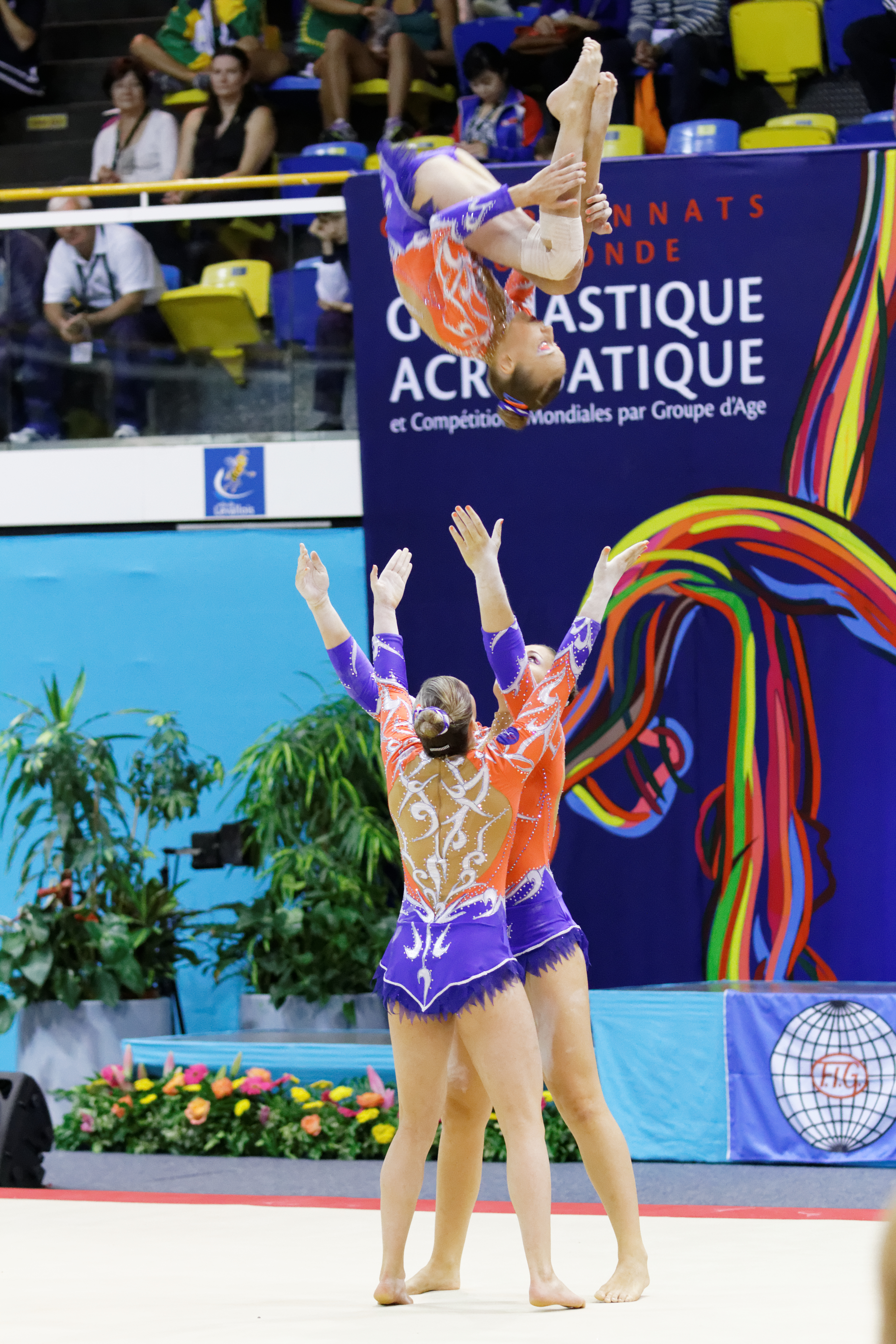
France trio

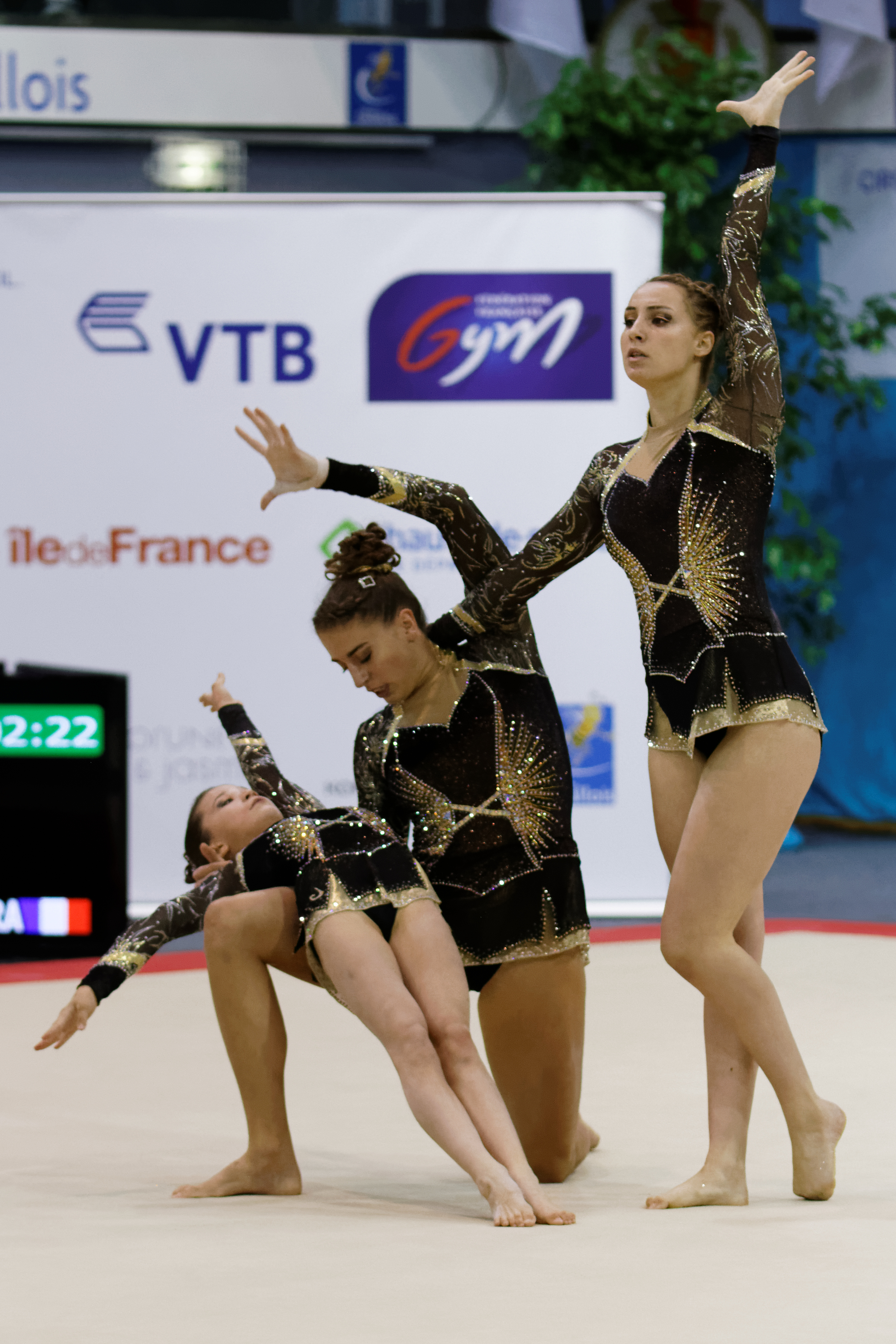
France trio

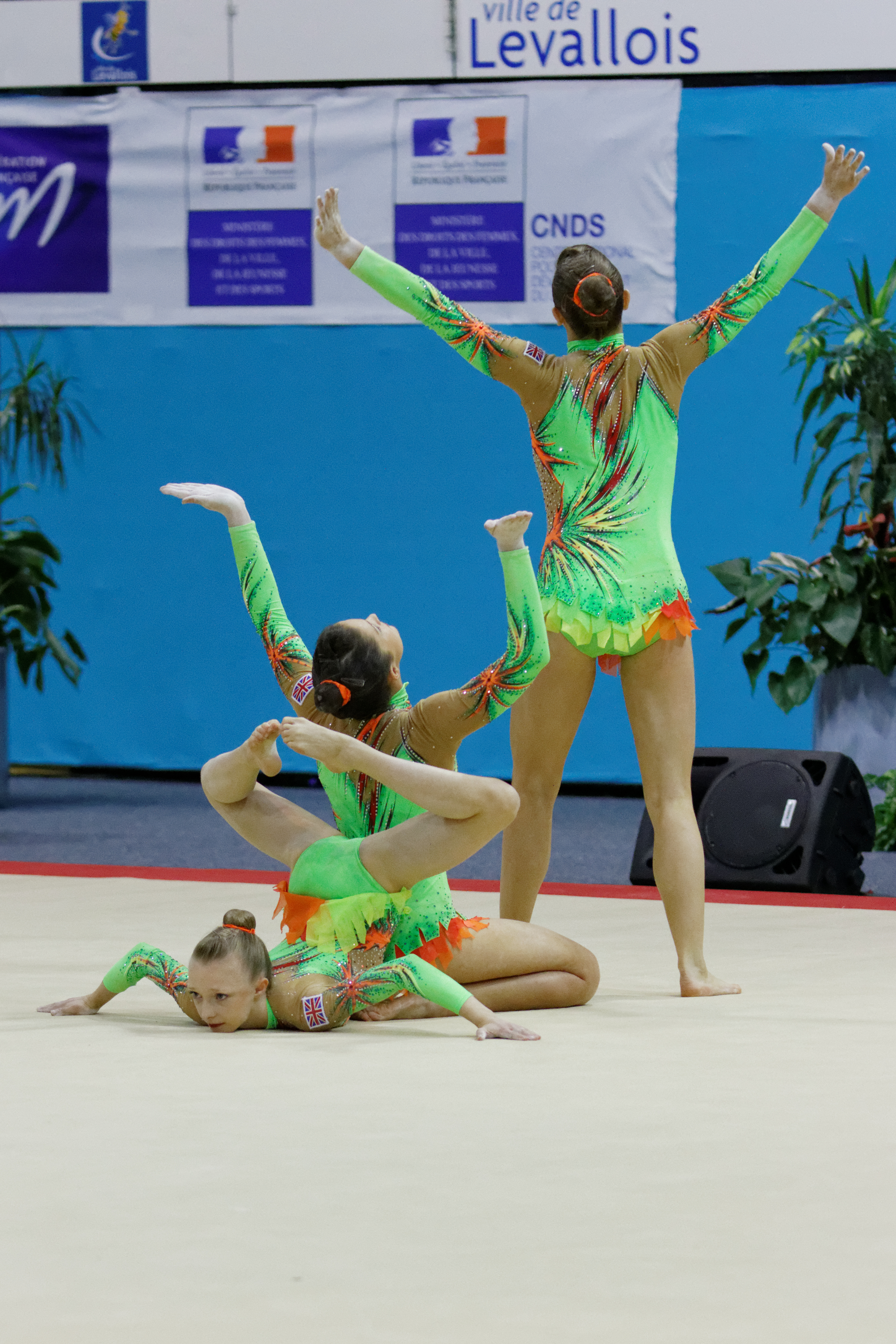
Great Britain trio

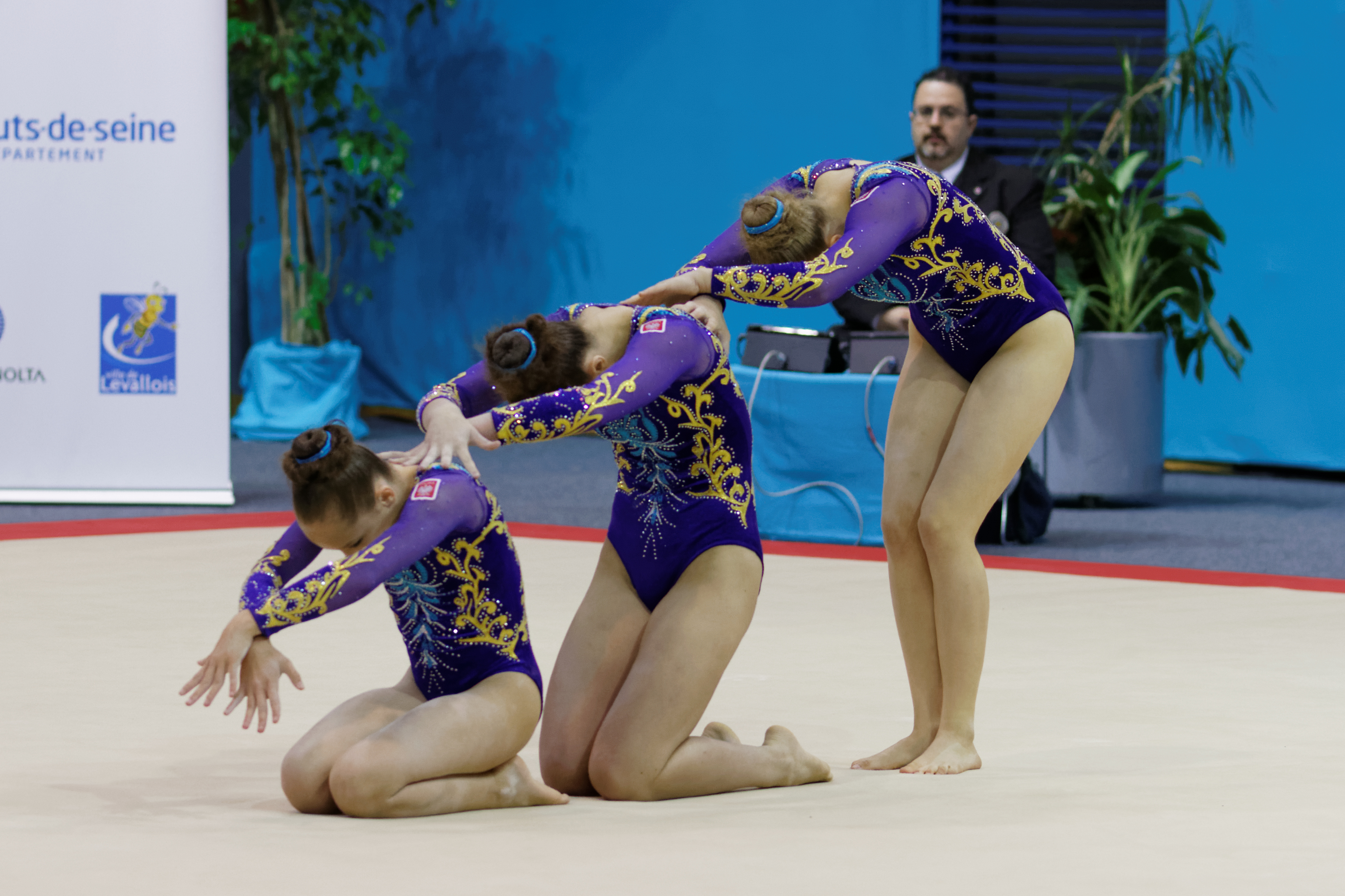
Poland trio

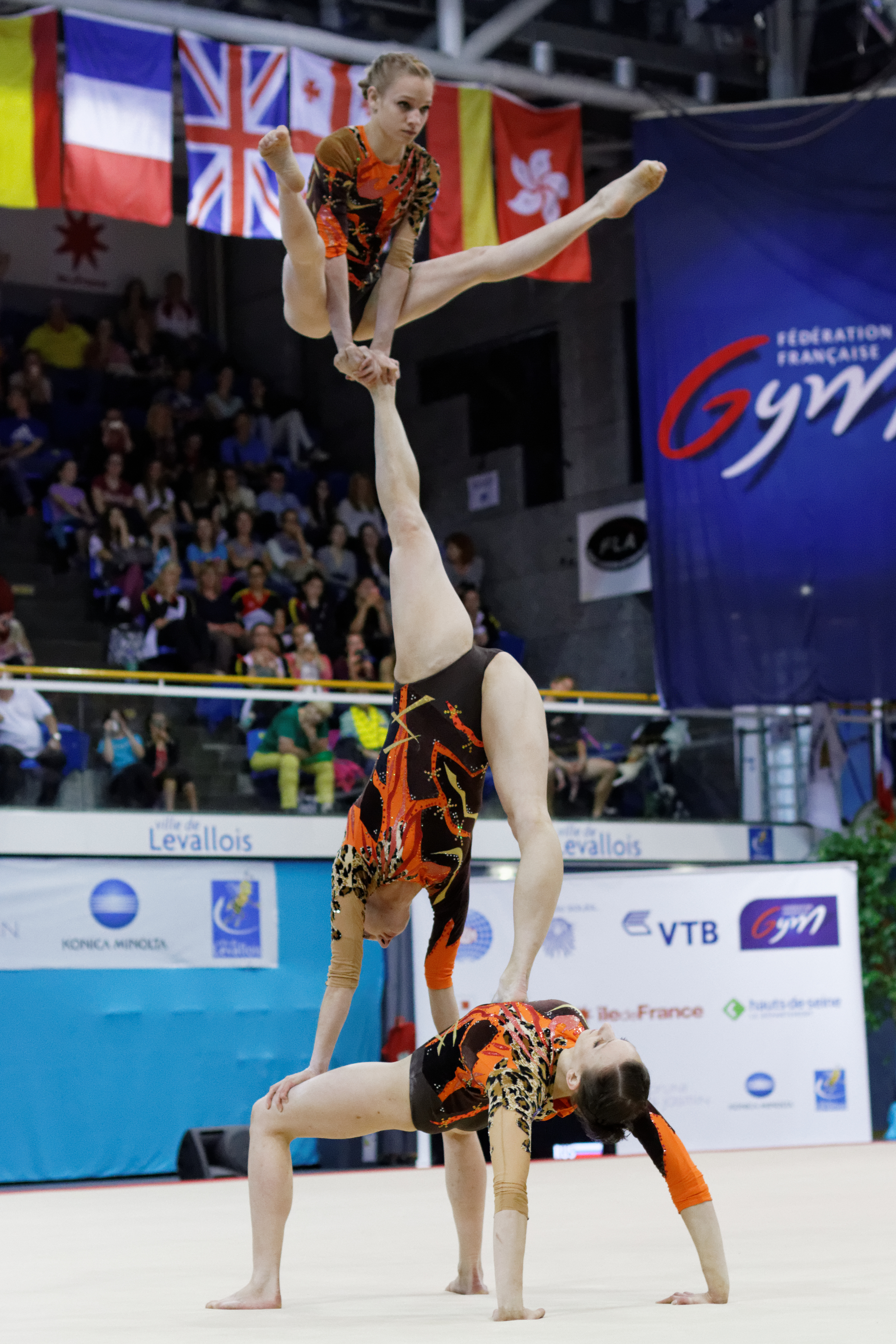
Russia trio

The 2014 Acrobatic Gymnastics World Championships were held in Levallois-Perret, France at the Palais des Sports Marcel-Cerdan. The women's groups qualifications were held on 10, 11 and 12 July 2014.

Position	Team	Balance	Dynamic	Combined	Total	Qual.
1	Russia; Valeriia Belkina; Victoria Ilicheva; Alena Kholod	28.410	28.460	28.370	85.240	Q
2	United Kingdom; Elise Matthews; Georgia Lancaster; Millie Spalding	28.365	28.770	28.085	85.220	Q
3	Belgium; Julie van Gelder; Ineke van Schoor; Kaat Dumarey	28.080	28.090	28.140	84.310	Q
4	North Korea; Ri Jin Hwa; Ri Hyang; Kim Un Sol	28.320	26.730	27.760	82.810	Q
5	Australia; Elizabeth Jacobs; Amy Lang; Elodie Rousseau Forwood	27.280	27.820	27.600	82.700	Q
6	Russia; Natalia Solodinina; Victoria Sukhareva; Natalia Lavrukhina	26.880	27.690	28.130	82.700	-
7	United Kingdom; Josephine Russell; Jennifer Bailey; Cicely Irwin	27.810	27.280	27.570	82.620	-
8	France; Madeleine Bayon; Alizée Costes; Noémie Nadaud	27.830	27.570	26.940	82.340	Q
9	Belarus; Yuliya Ramanenka; Julia Kovalenko; Angelina Sandovich	27.870	27.465	26.840	82.175	Q
10	Belarus; Alina Ivanova; Iryna Maiseyenka; Yuliya Ardziakova	27.405	27.410	27.160	81.945	-
11	France; Laura Viaud; Léna Carrau; Agathe Meunier	27.450	26.240	27.030	80.720	-
12	Portugal; Bárbara da Silva Sequeira; Íris Mendes; Jéssica Correia	27.310	27.180	24.370	78.860	Q
13	Israel; May Miller; Avia Brener; Shoval Sofer	25.870	26.360	25.440	77.670	R
14	United States; Hannah Silverman; Christina Antoniades; Emily Ruppert	24.845	26.675	25.770	77.290	R
15	Australia; Mei Hubnik; Amber Kaldor; Madison Chan	24.760	26.860	25.610	77.230	-
16	Ukraine; Kateryna Bilokon; Nadiia Kotliar; Olena Karakuts	24.500	26.225	25.795	76.520	-
17	Azerbaijan; Aynus Huseynova; Lala Huseynova; Narmin Ramazanova	57.470	24.670	25.425	75.835	-
18	Germany; Janina Hiller; Daniela Mehlhaff; Selina Frey-Sander	26.600	22.510	26.000	75.110	-
19	Germany; Nora Schaefer; Luise Zscheile; Franca Schamber	24.170	25.670	24.805	74.645	-
20	Poland; Karolina Nowak; Marta Srutwa; Agnieszka Rawinis	26.615	23.510	23.780	73.905	-
21	Georgia; Nino Diasamidze; Mariam Gigolashvili; Magda Rusia	25.360	23.180	21.780	70.320	-
22	Brazil; Carina Félix de Aflito; Fernanda da Anunciação Souza; Mariana Fortunato de Carvalho	17.650	21.950	20.775	60.375	-
23	Brazil; Andressa Nogueira Tolentino, Bárbara Tenório Dos Santos; Sabrina Rocha Rodrigues	17.450	21.490	17.150	56.090	-
24	Hong Kong; Ho Ching Lam; Carmen Gast; Lam Ho Ching	14.650	20.000	14.250	48.900	-
