= Amy Lang (disambiguation) =

Amy Lang is an Australian acrobatic gymnast.

Amy Lang may also refer to:

- Amy Lang, character in Silk (TV series)
- "Who Killed Amy Lang", starring Carol Higgins Clark
