= Lavrukhin =

Lavrukhin (masculine, Russian: Лаврухин) or Lavrukhina (feminine, Russian: Лаврухина) is a Russian surname. Notable people with the surname include:

- Natalia Lavrukhina (born 1987), Russian acrobatic gymnast
