= Carmen Gast =

Hong Kong female acrobatic gymnast

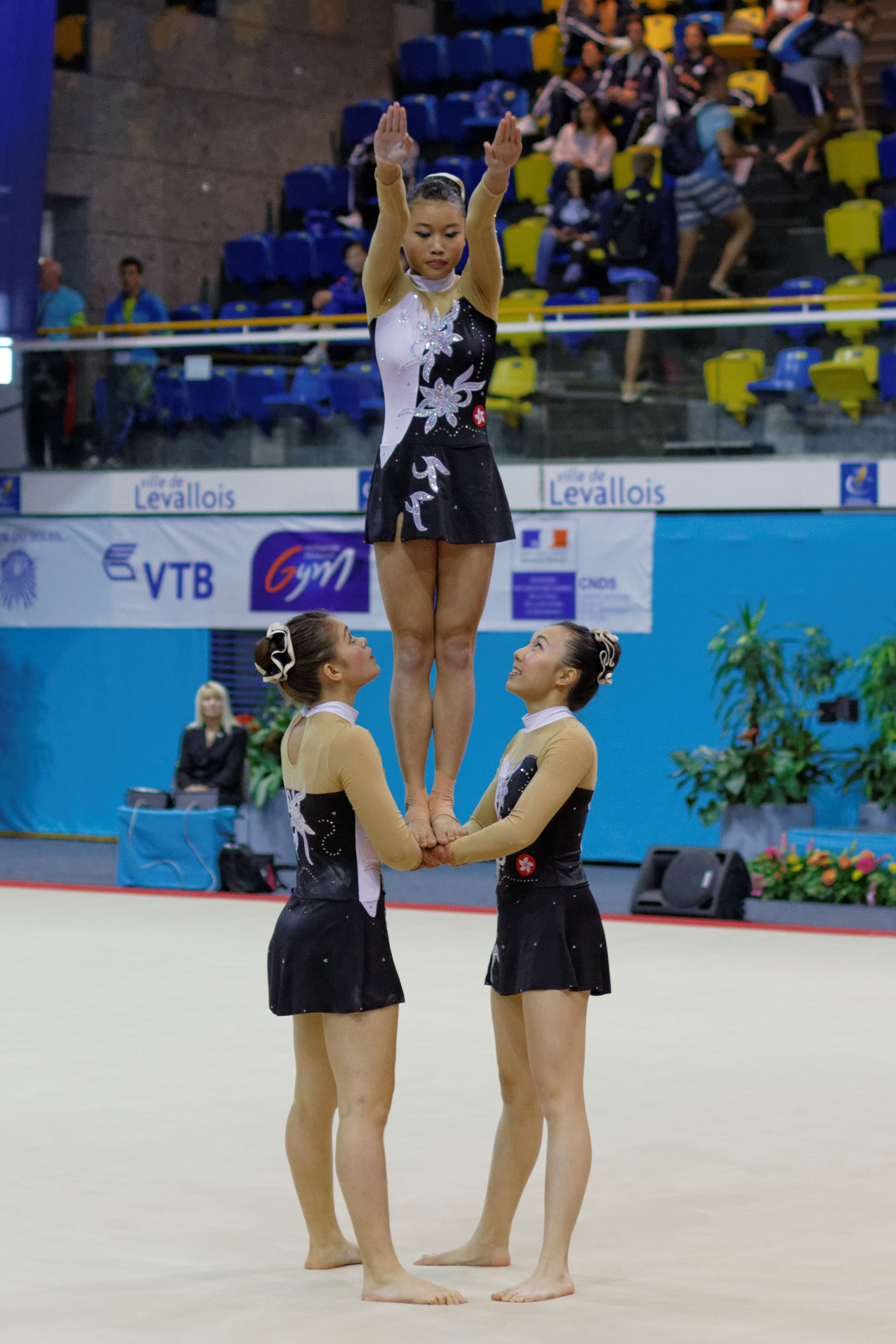

Personal information
- Born: November 16, 1994 (age 31)

Gymnastics career
- Discipline: Acrobatic gymnastics
- Country represented: Hong Kong
- Head coach: Lai Cheung Lik
- Music: Balanced - Heart Cry, Dynamics - Hanuman

Carmen Gast (born November 16, 1994) is a Hong Kong female acrobatic gymnast. With partners Ho Ching Lam and Lam Ho Ching, Carmen Gast competed in the 2014 Acrobatic Gymnastics World Championships.
