= Amber Kaldor =

Australian acrobatic gymnast

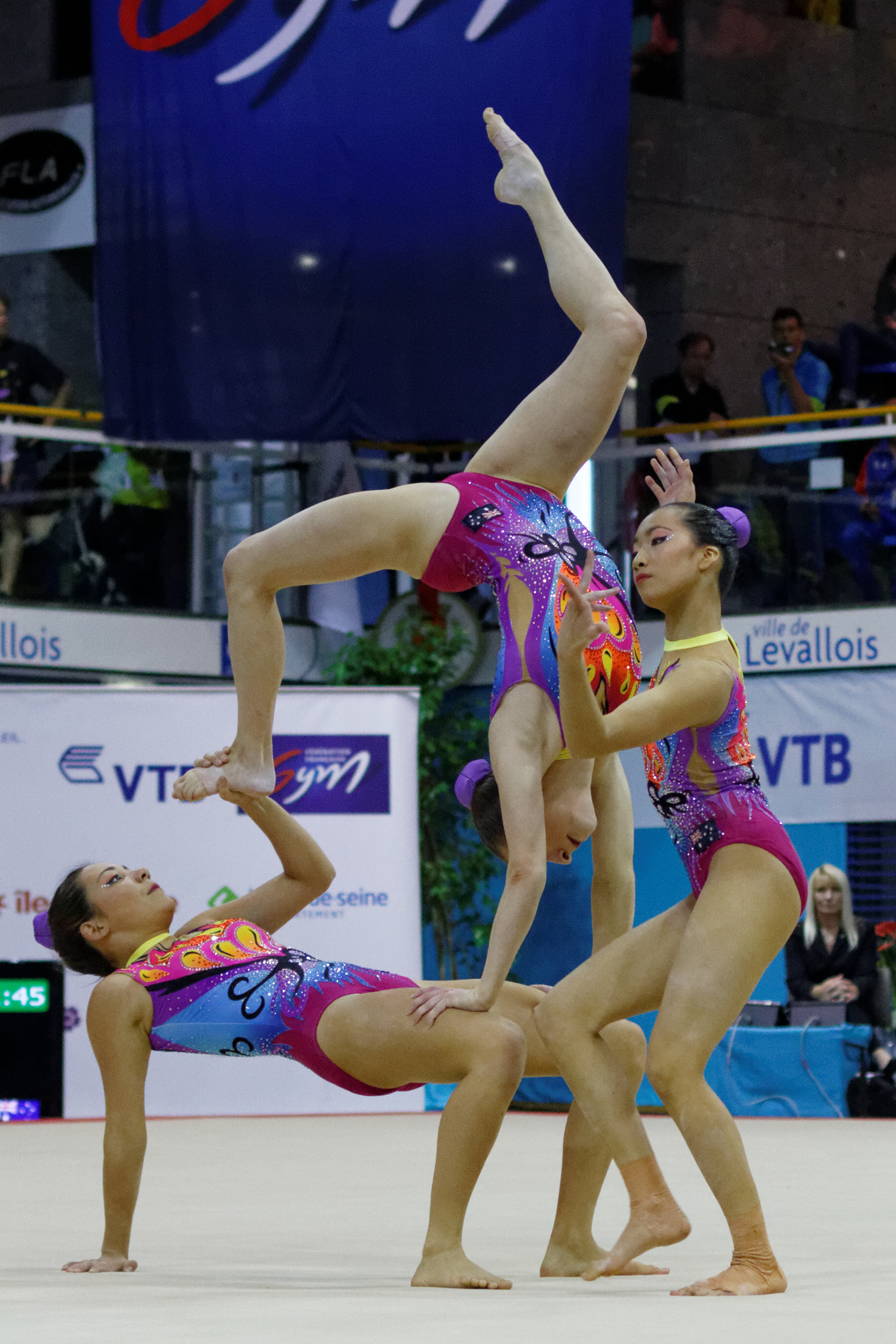
- Amber Kaldor, Madison Chan and Mei Hubnik at the 2014 Acrobatic Gymnastics World Championships

Personal information
- Born: 16 October 1990 (age 35)

Gymnastics career
- Discipline: Acrobatic gymnastics
- Country represented: Australia
- Club: SXL Gymnastics
- Head coach: Xi Lin Shen

Amber Kaldor (born 16 October 1990) is an Australian female acrobatic gymnast. With partners Mei Hubnik and Madison Chan, Kaldor achieved 15th in the 2014 Acrobatic Gymnastics World Championships.
