= Agnieszka Rawinis =

Polish acrobatic gymnast

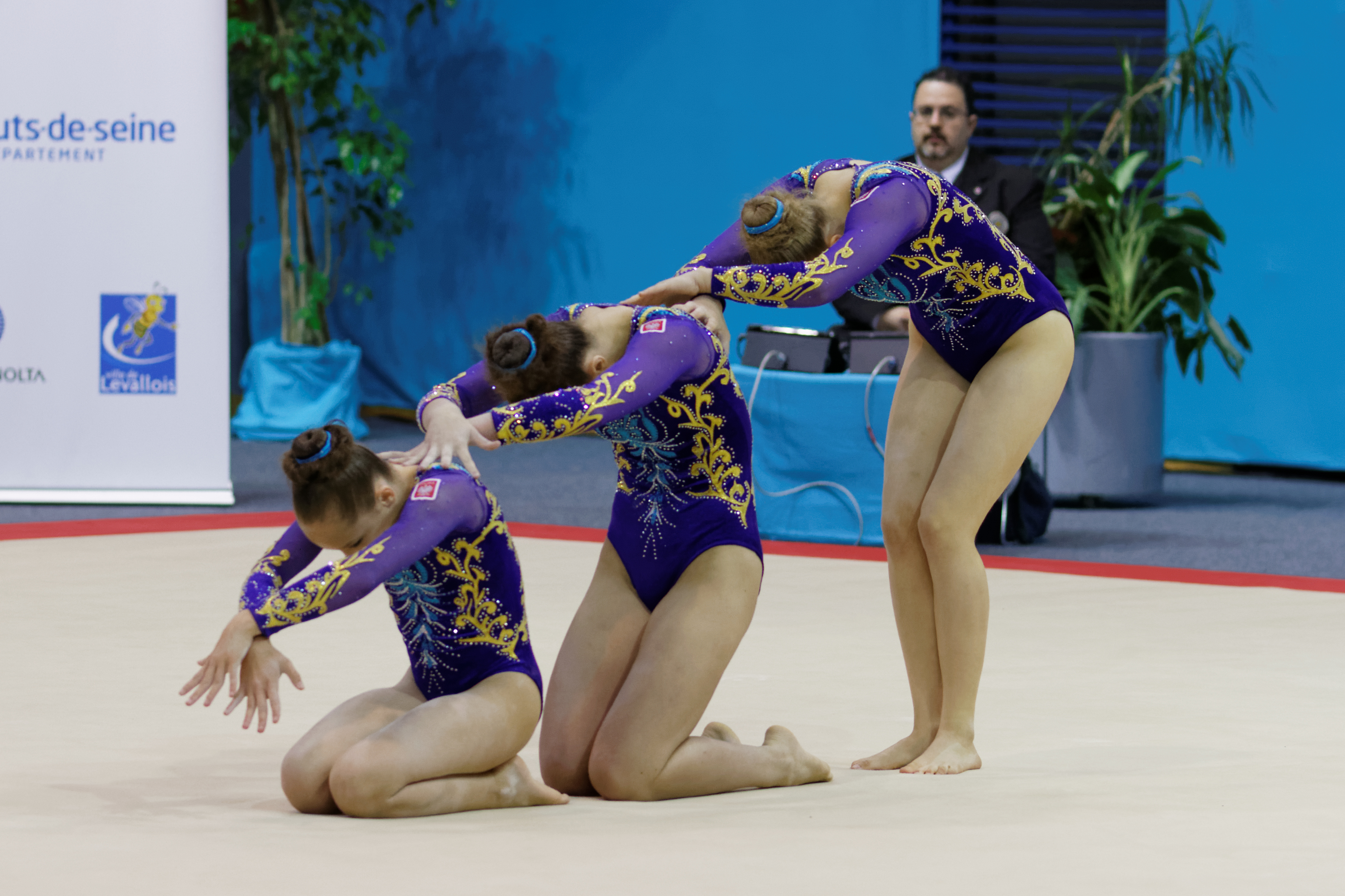

Personal information
- Born: 24 March 1995 (age 31)

Gymnastics career
- Discipline: Acrobatic gymnastics
- Country represented: Poland
- Club: Rafa Art of Gymnastic

Agnieszka Rawinis (born 24 March 1995) is a Polish female acrobatic gymnast. With partners Marta Srutwa and Karolina Nowak, Rawinis competed in the 2014 Acrobatic Gymnastics World Championships.
