= Cicely Irwin =

British acrobatic gymnast (born 1999)

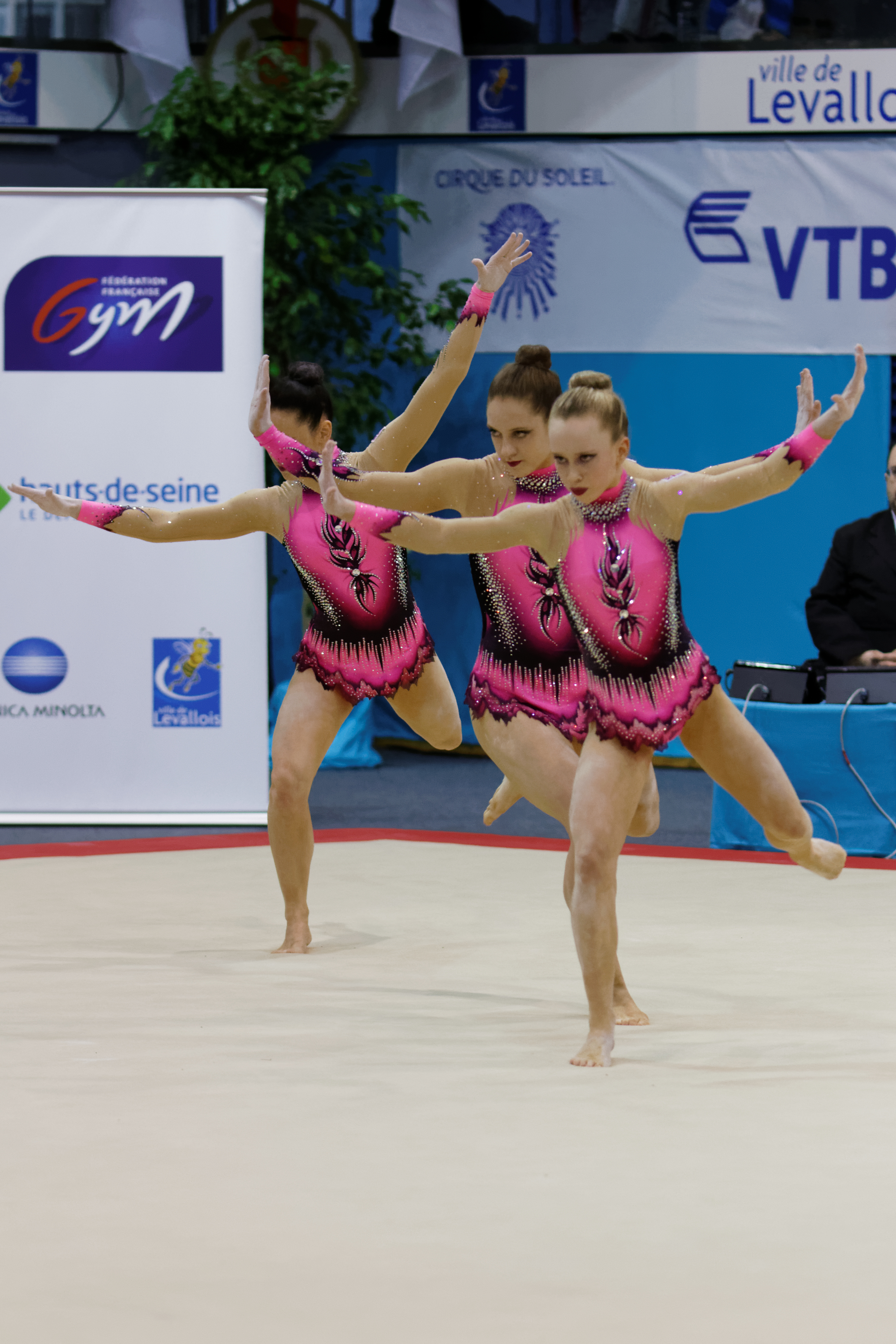

Personal information
- Born: 13 October 1999 (age 26)

Gymnastics career
- Discipline: Acrobatic gymnastics
- Country represented: United Kingdom

Cicely Irwin (born 13 October 1999) is a British female acrobatic gymnast. With partners Jennifer Bailey and Josephine Russell, Irwin competed in the 2014 Acrobatic Gymnastics World Championships.
