= Victoria Sukhareva =

Russian acrobatic gymnast

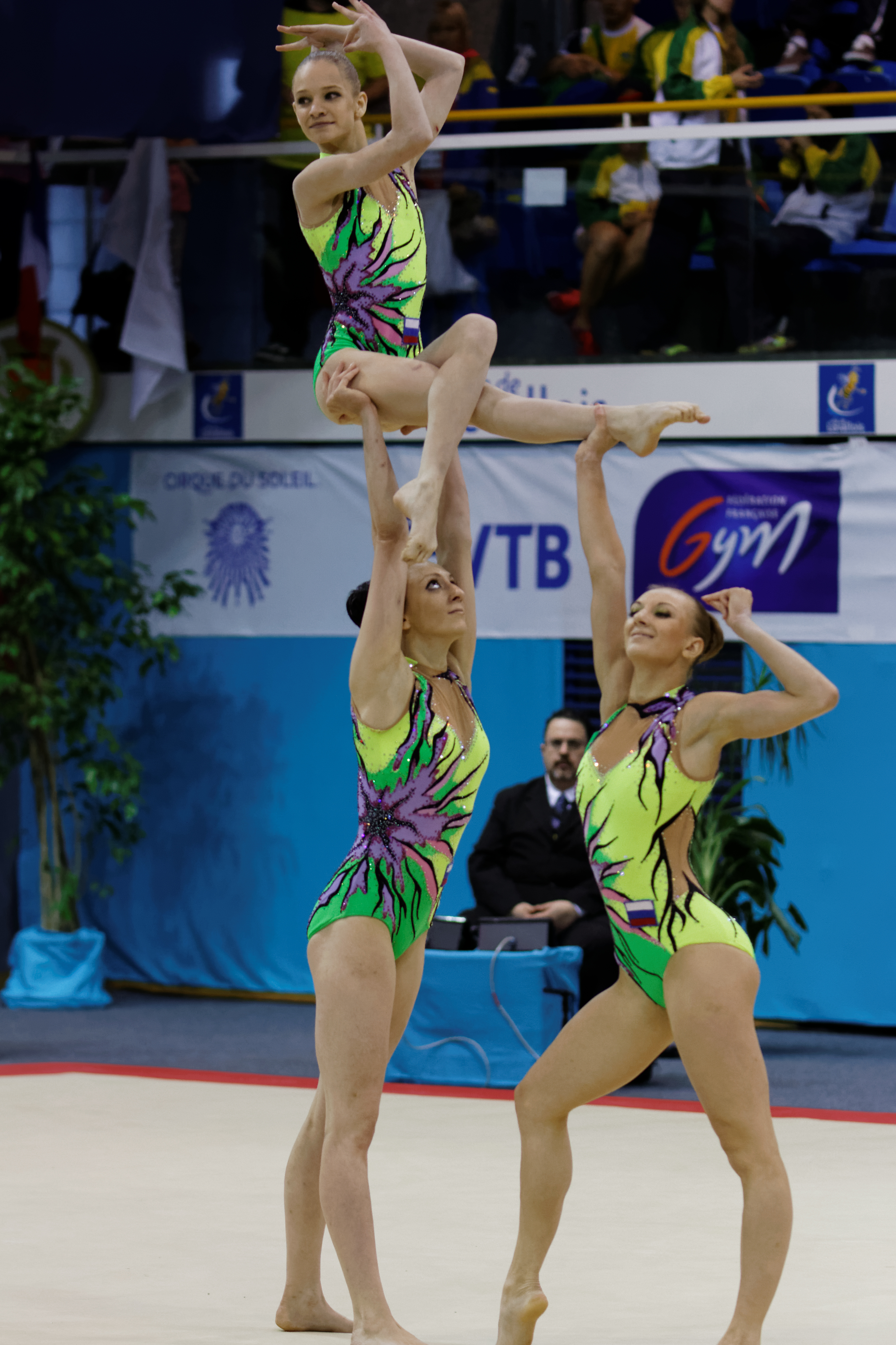

Personal information
- Born: 14 August 1990 (age 36)

Gymnastics career
- Discipline: Acrobatic gymnastics
- Country represented: Russia

Victoria Sukhareva (born 14 August 1990) is a Russian female acrobatic gymnast. With partners Natalia Solodinina and Natalia Lavrukhina, Sukhareva competed in the 2014 Acrobatic Gymnastics World Championships.
