= Magda Rusia =

Georgian acrobatic gymnast

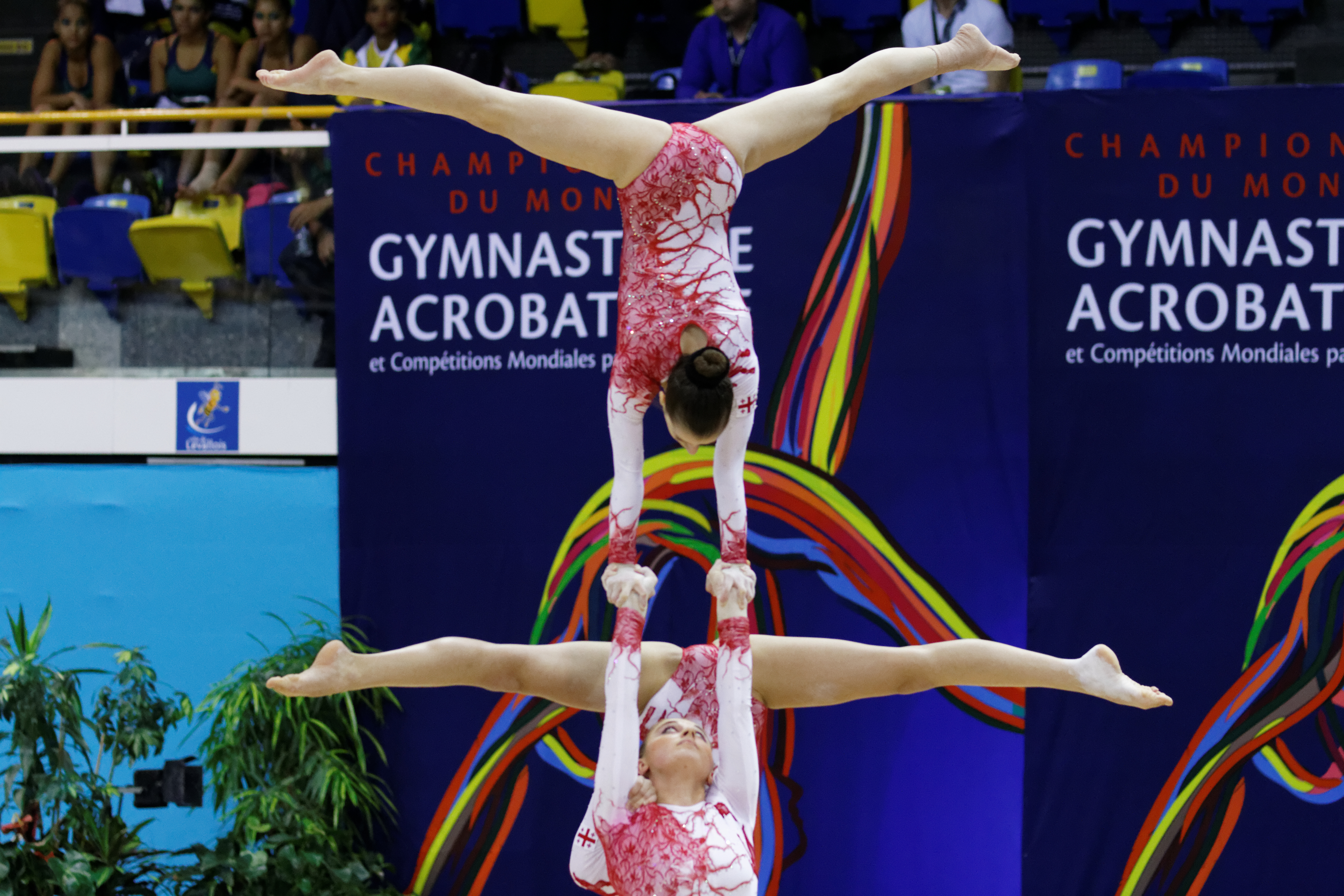
- Magda Rusia at the 2014 Acrobatic Gymnastics World Championships

Personal information
- Born: 28 December 1994 (age 31)

Gymnastics career
- Discipline: Acrobatic gymnastics
- Country represented: Georgia

Magda Rusia (born 28 December 1994) is a Georgian acrobatic gymnast. With partners Mariam Gigolashvili and Nino Diasamidze, Rusia competed in the 2014 Acrobatic Gymnastics World Championships.
