= Selina Frey-Sander =

German acrobatic gymnast (born 1999)

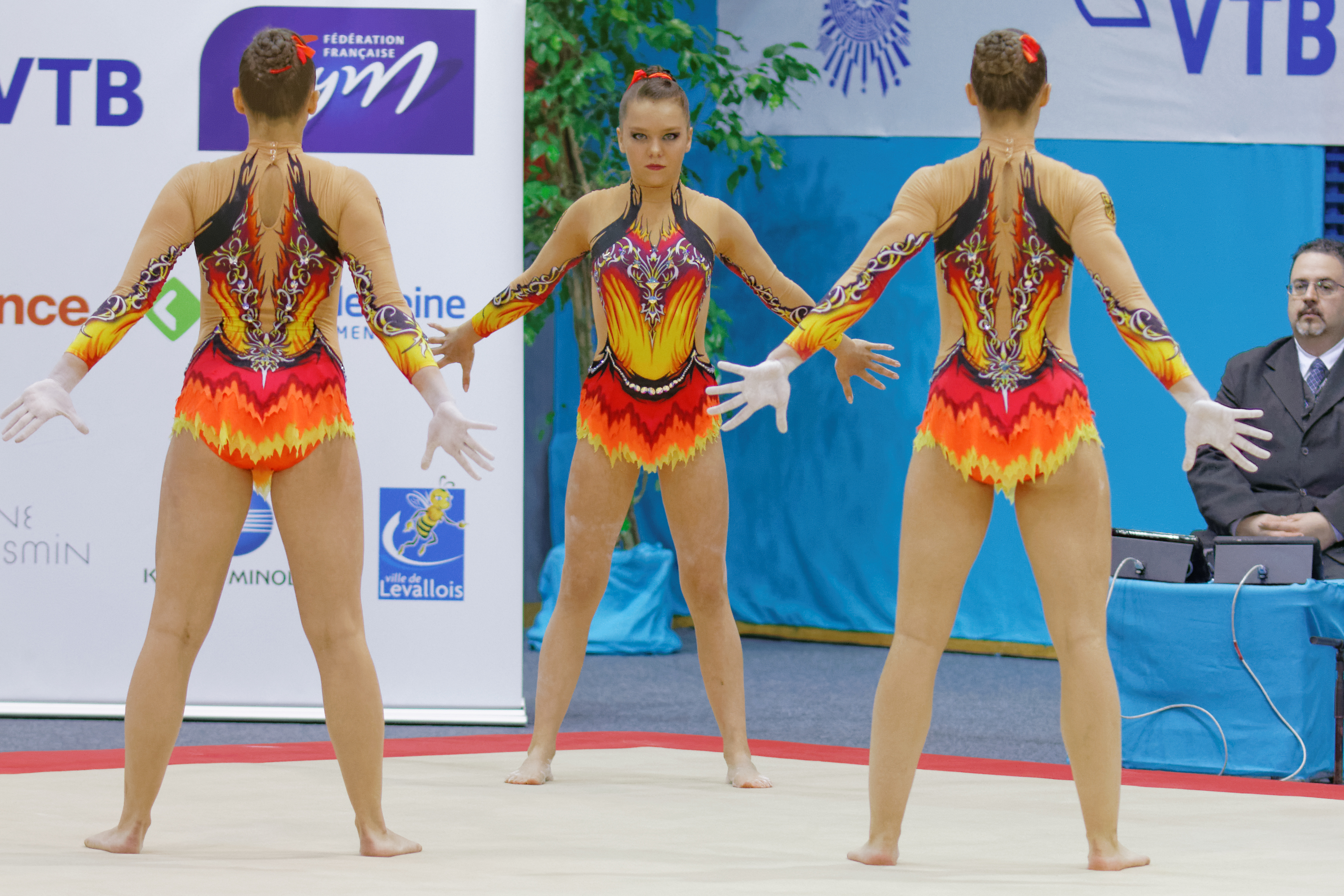
- 2014 Acrobatic Gymnastics World Championships, 10-12 July, Levallois-Perret, France. Qualifications: women's group. Germany.

Personal information
- Born: 19 February 1999 (age 27)

Gymnastics career
- Discipline: Acrobatic gymnastics
- Country represented: Germany

Selina Frey-Sander (born 19 February 1999) is a German female acrobatic gymnast. With partners Daniela Mehlhaff and Janina Hiller, Frey-Sander competed in the 2014 Acrobatic Gymnastics World Championships.
