= Olena Karakuts =

Ukrainian acrobatic gymnast

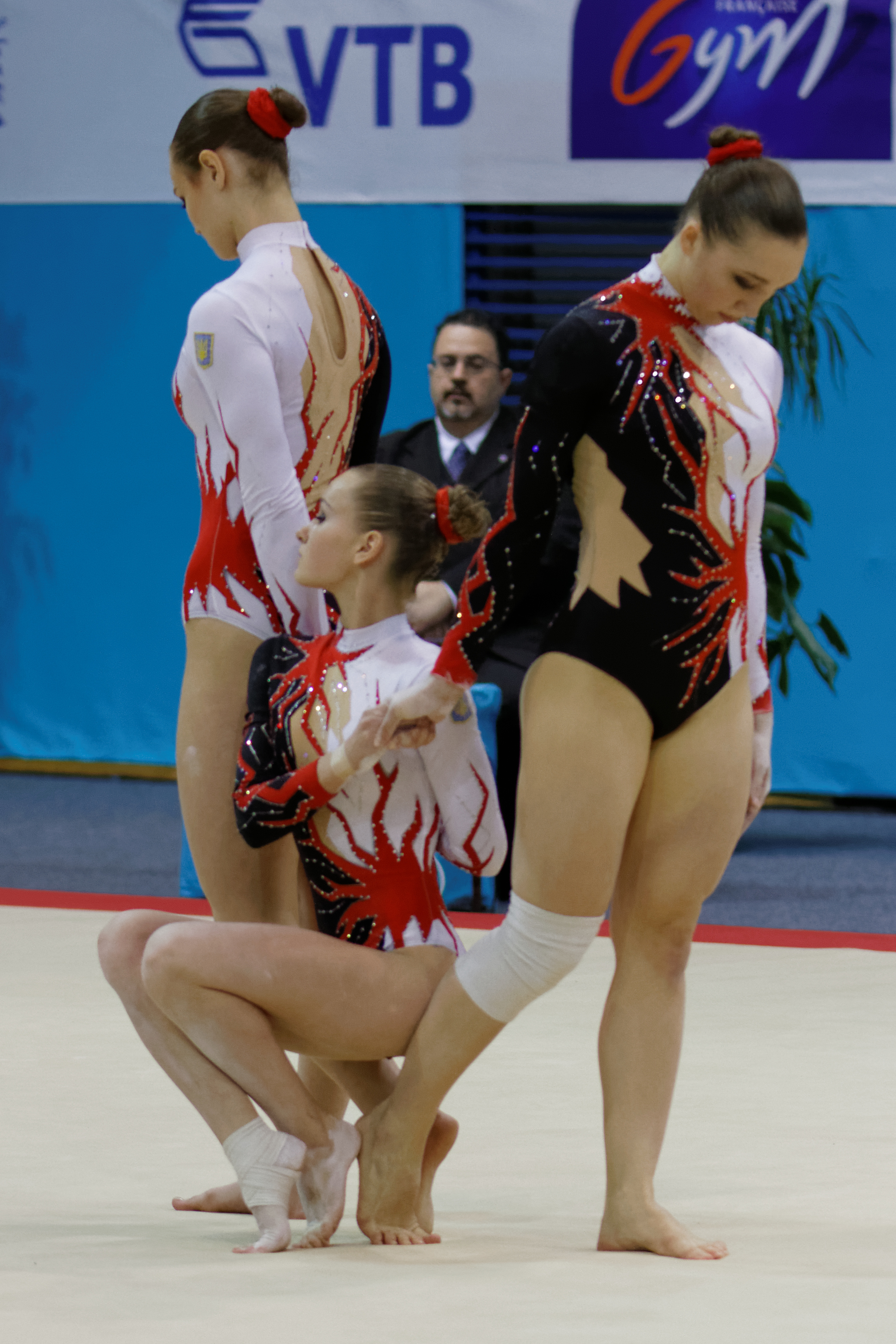

Personal information
- Born: 1 October 1992 (age 33)

Gymnastics career
- Discipline: Acrobatic gymnastics
- Country represented: Ukraine

Olena Karakuts (born 1 October 1992) is a Ukrainian female acrobatic gymnast. With partners Nadiia Kotliar and Kateryna Bilokon, Karakuts competed in the 2014 Acrobatic Gymnastics World Championships.
