= Hannah Silverman =

American acrobatic gymnast

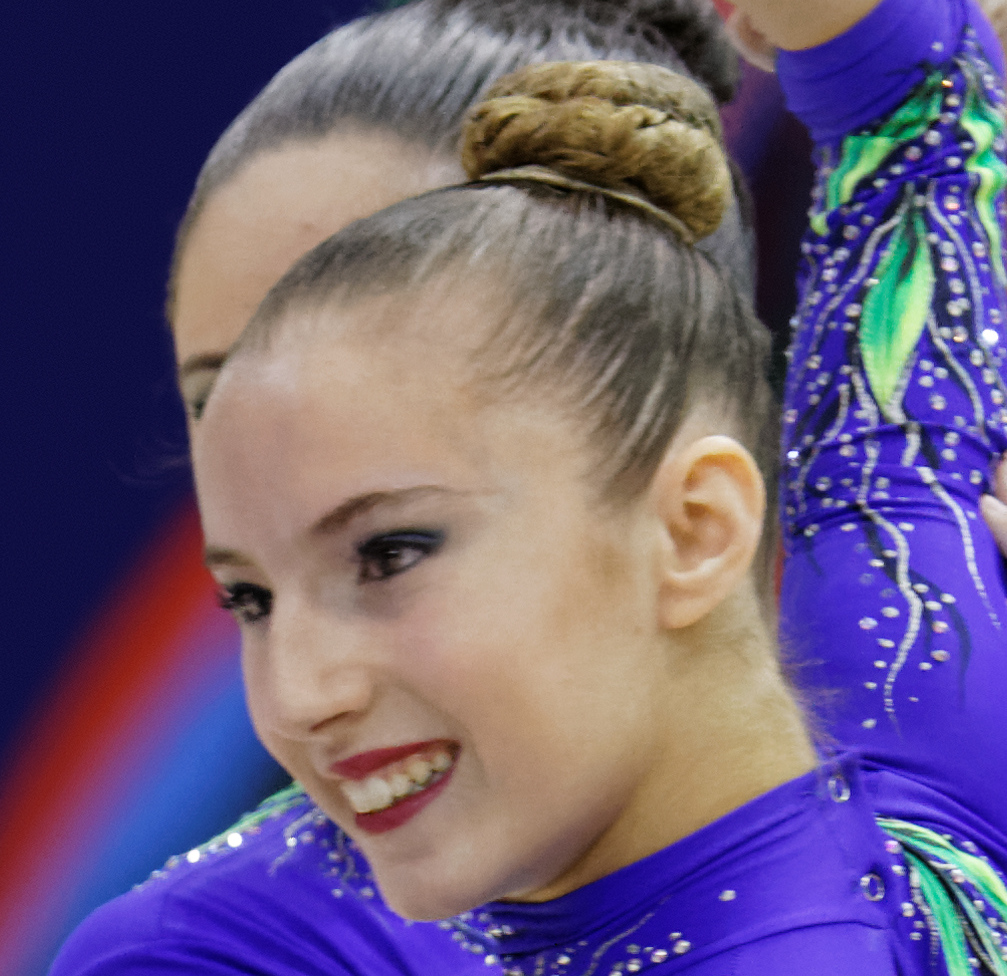
- Hannah Silverman in 2014

Personal information
- Full name: Hannah Leigh Silverman
- Born: July 13, 1999 (age 27)
- Height: 5 ft 0 in (152 cm)

Gymnastics career
- Discipline: Acrobatic gymnastics
- Country represented: United States (5)
- Club: EAGC
- Head coach: Daniil Kostovetskiy
- Assistant coach: Elena Arakelyan
- Choreographer: Elena Arakelyan, Arthur Davis III
- Retired: 2016

Hannah Silverman is an American female acrobatic gymnast. With partners Christina Antoniades and Emily Ruppert, Silverman competed in the 2014 Acrobatic Gymnastics World Championships. Hannah was born in Columbia, MD and lives in Clarksville, MD. Hannah retired in 2016, going into her senior year of high school, due to various head injuries. These occurred while she was in Belgium, in 2016. She is currently following her dreams to become a pediatric RN.

- Career:

Competed at the 2016 World Championships
2014 U.S. champion (women's group)
Competed at the 2014 World Championships
2013 U.S. champion (woman's group)
Competed at the 2012 World Championships
2012 U.S. champion (woman's group)
