= Jennifer Bailey =

British acrobatic gymnast

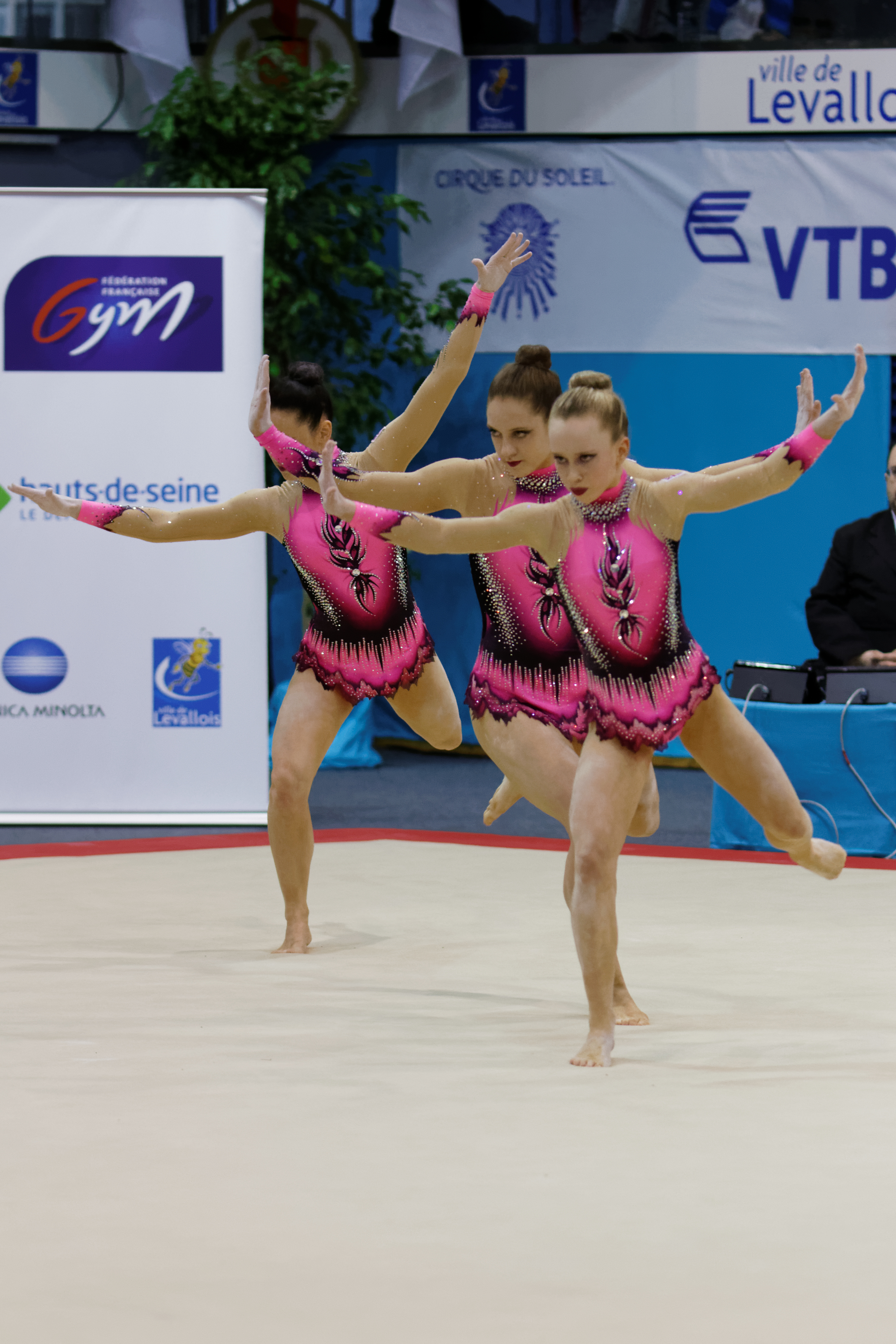

Personal information
- Born: 23 December 1996 (age 29)

Gymnastics career
- Discipline: Acrobatic gymnastics
- Country represented: Great Britain

Jennifer Bailey (born 23 December 1996) is a British female acrobatic gymnast. With partners Josephine Russell and Cicely Irwin, Bailey competed in the 2014 Acrobatic Gymnastics World Championships.
