= Mariam Gigolashvili =

Georgian acrobatic gymnast (born 1994)

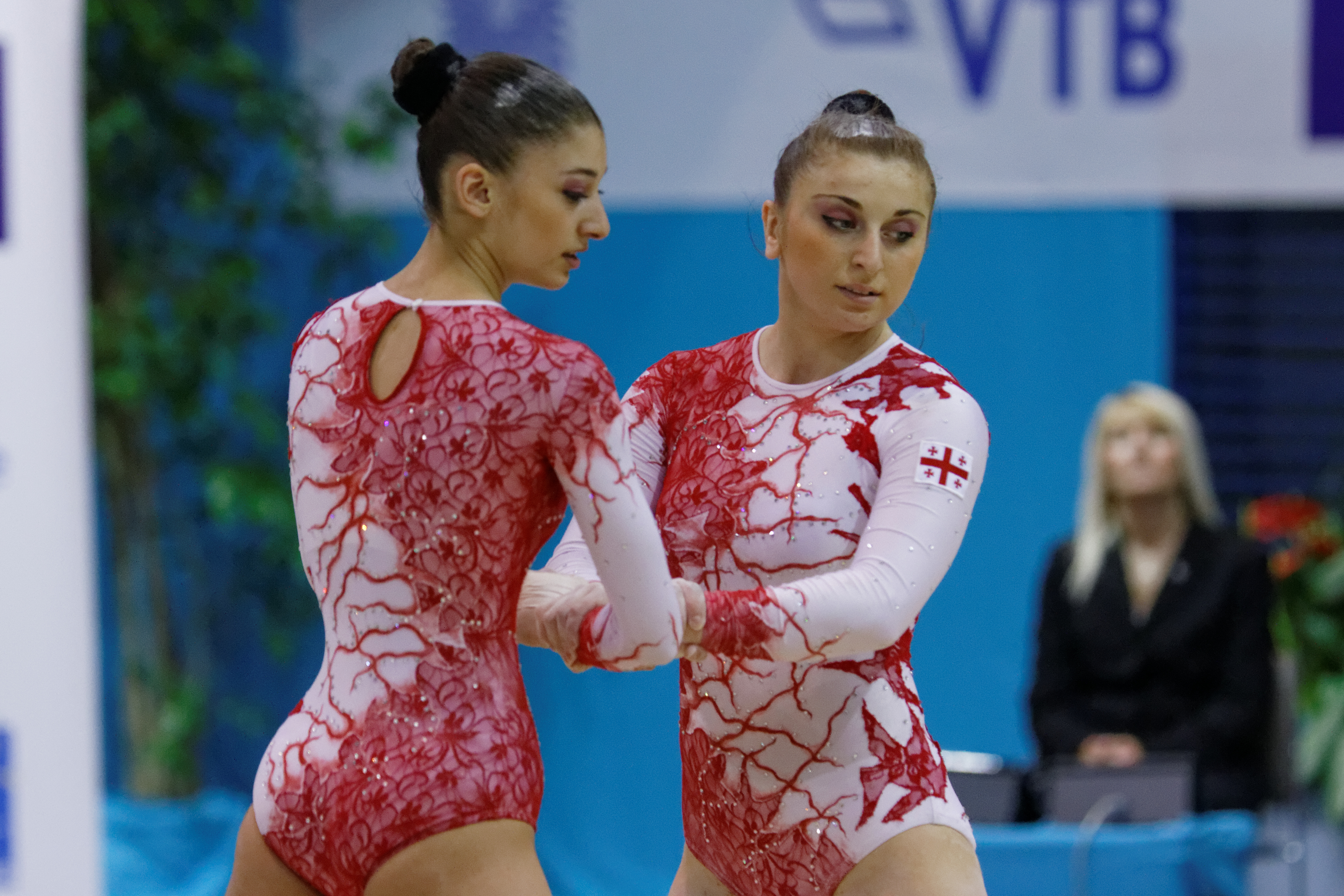
- Mariam Gigolashvili and Nino Diasamidze at the 2014 Acrobatic Gymnastics World Championships

Personal information
- Born: 10 November 1994 (age 31)

Gymnastics career
- Discipline: Acrobatic gymnastics
- Country represented: Georgia

Mariam Gigolashvili is a Georgian acrobatic gymnast. With partners Nino Diasamidze and Magda Rusia, Gigolashvili competed in the 2014 Acrobatic Gymnastics World Championships.
