= Franca Schamber =

German acrobatic gymnast

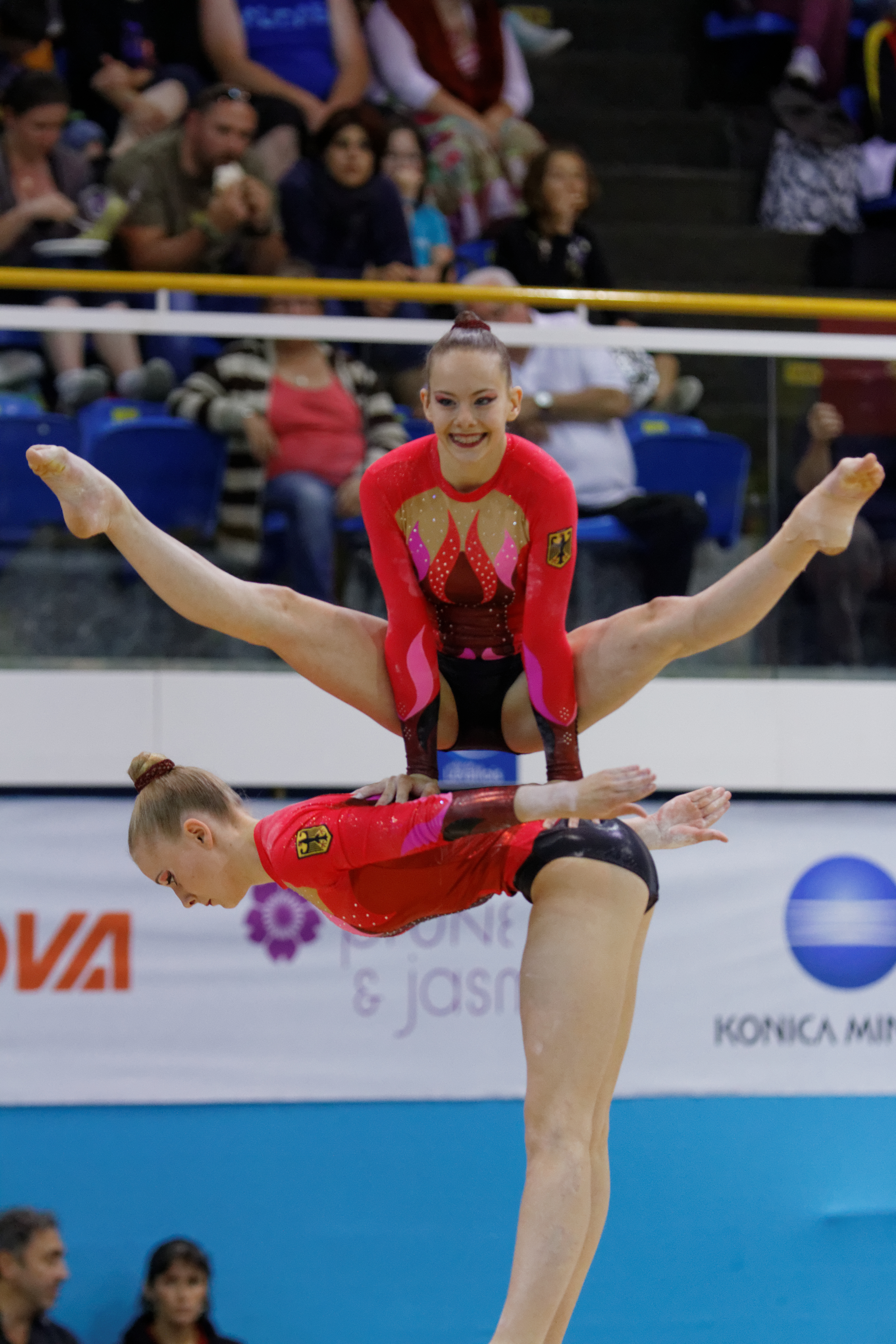
- Born: 10 December 1998 (age 27)

Gymnastics career
- Discipline: Acrobatic gymnastics
- Country represented: Germany

Franca Schamber (born 10 December 1998) is a German female acrobatic gymnast. With partners Luise Zscheile and Nora Schaefer, Schamber competed in the 2014 Acrobatic Gymnastics World Championships.
