= Janina Hiller =

German acrobatic gymnast

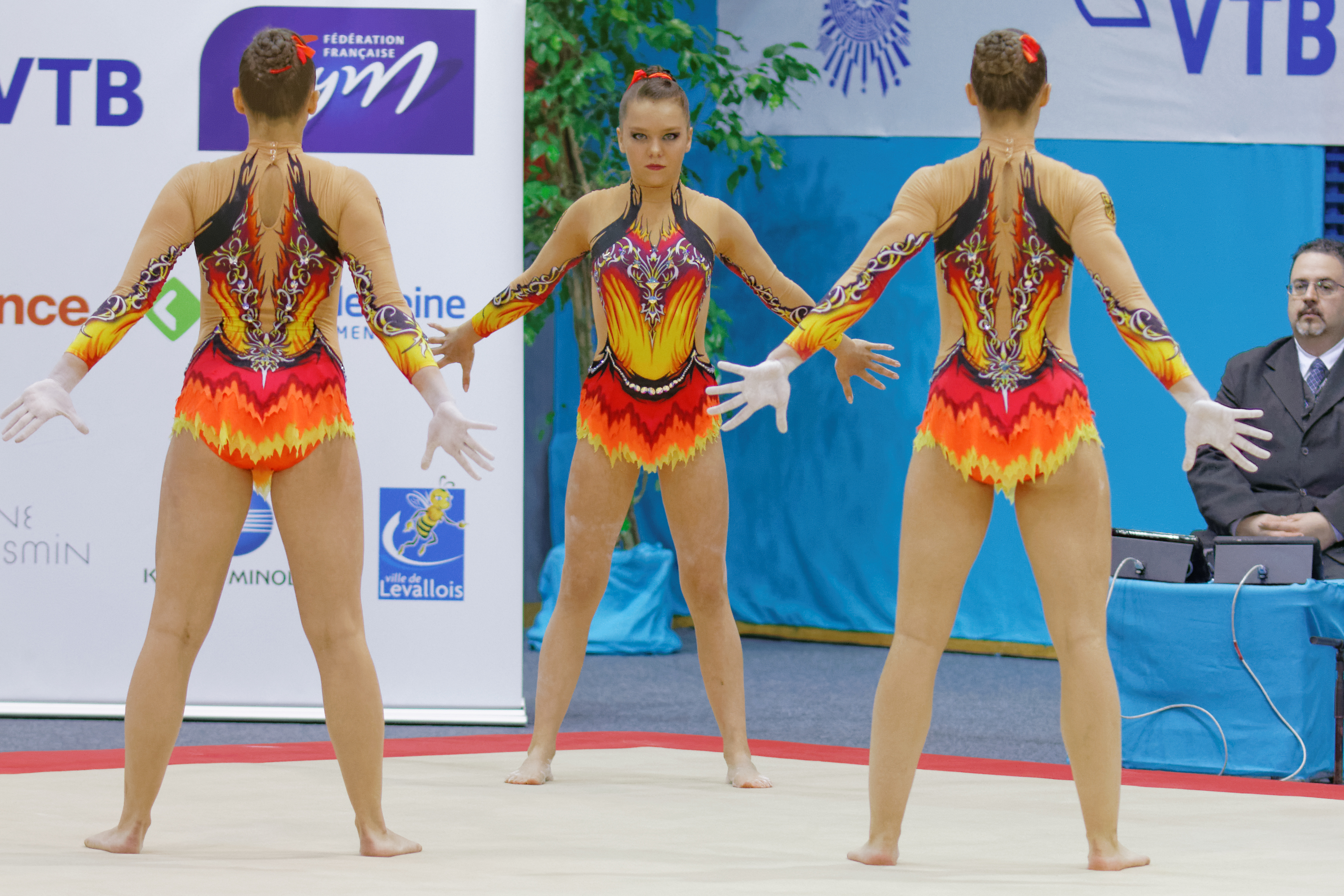
- 2014 Acrobatic Gymnastics World Championships, 10-12 July, Levallois-Perret, France. Qualifications: women's group. Germany.

Personal information
- Born: 18 March 1988 (age 38)

Gymnastics career
- Discipline: Acrobatic gymnastics
- Country represented: Germany

Janina Hiller (born 18 March 1988) is a German female acrobatic gymnast. With partners Daniela Mehlhaff and Selina Frey-Sander, Hiller competed in the 2014 Acrobatic Gymnastics World Championships.
