= Madison Chan =

Australian acrobatic gymnast

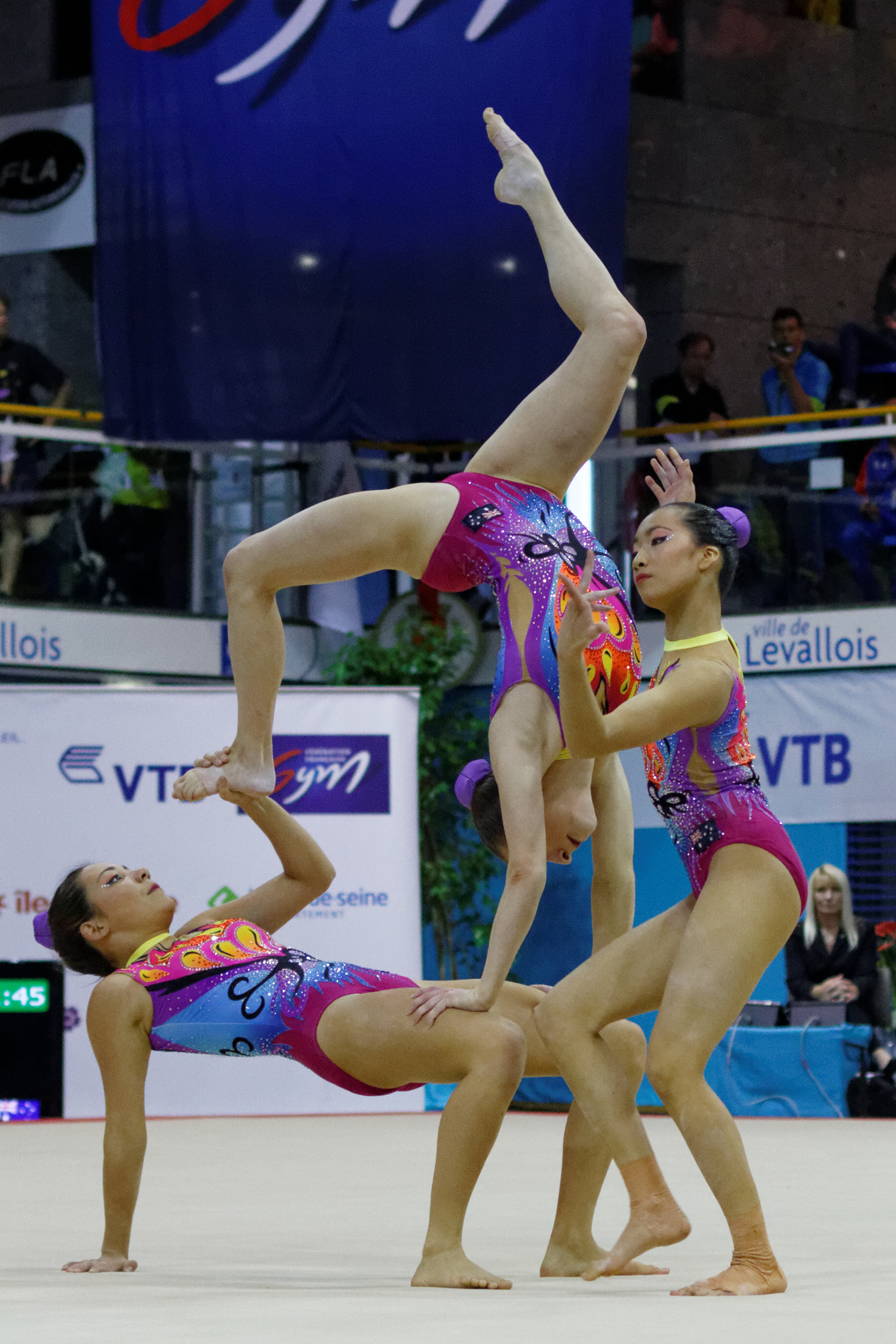
- Madison Chan, Mei Hubnik and Amber Kaldor at the 2014 Acrobatic Gymnastics World Championships

Personal information
- Born: 26 October 1997 (age 28)

Gymnastics career
- Discipline: Acrobatic gymnastics
- Country represented: Australia
- Club: SXL Gymnastics
- Head coach: Xi Lin Shen

Madison Chan (born 26 October 1997) is an Australian female acrobatic gymnast. With partners Mei Hubnik and Amber Kaldor, Chan achieved 15th in the 2014 Acrobatic Gymnastics World Championships.
