= Natalia Solodinina =

Russian acrobatic gymnast

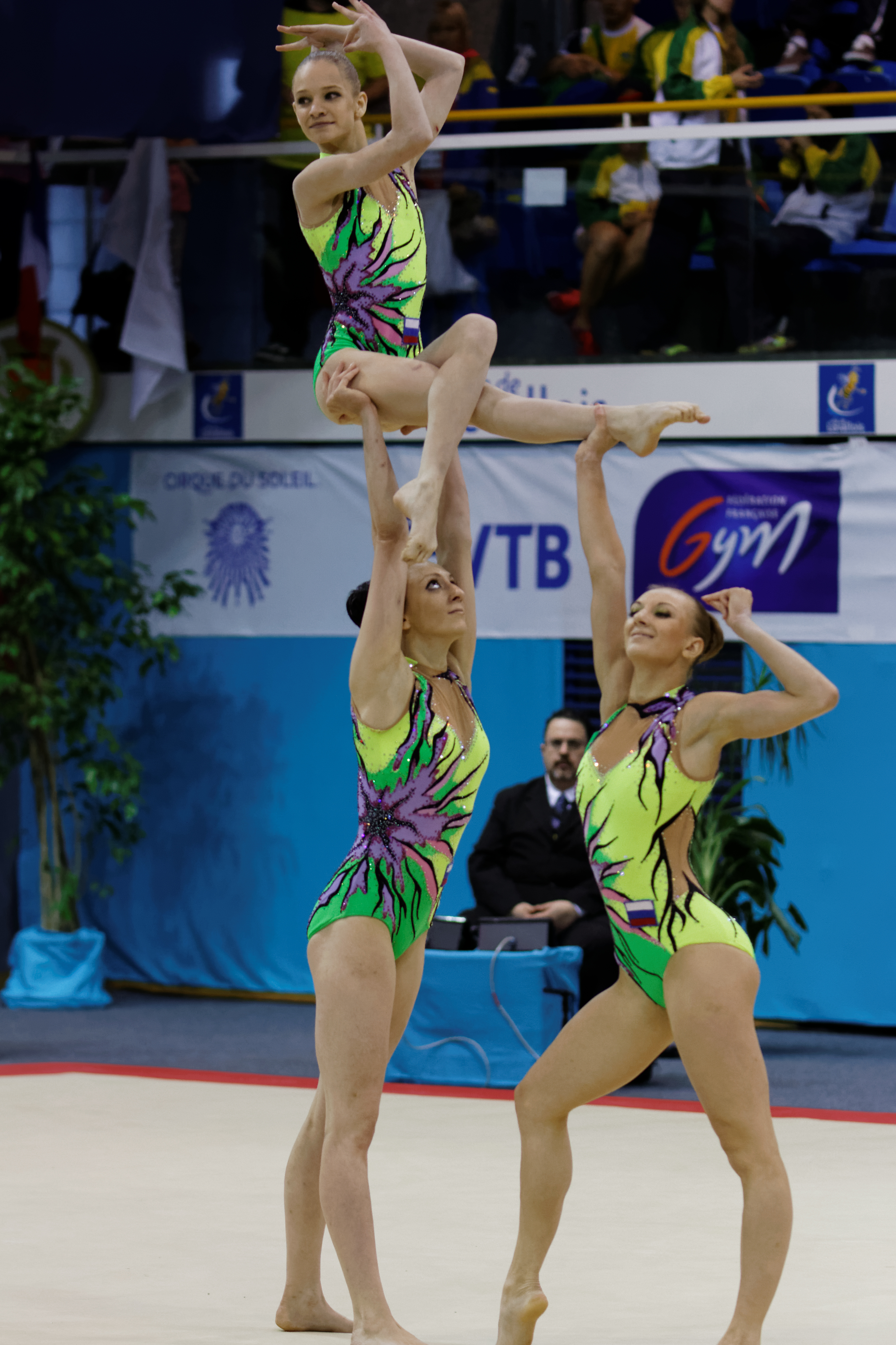

Personal information
- Born: 13 December 1997 (age 28)

Gymnastics career
- Discipline: Acrobatic gymnastics
- Country represented: Russia

Natalia Solodinina (born 13 December 1997) is a Russian female acrobatic gymnast. With partners Victoria Sukhareva and Natalia Lavrukhina, Solodinina competed in the 2014 Acrobatic Gymnastics World Championships.
