= Lam Ho Ching =

Hong Kong acrobatic gymnast (born 1998)

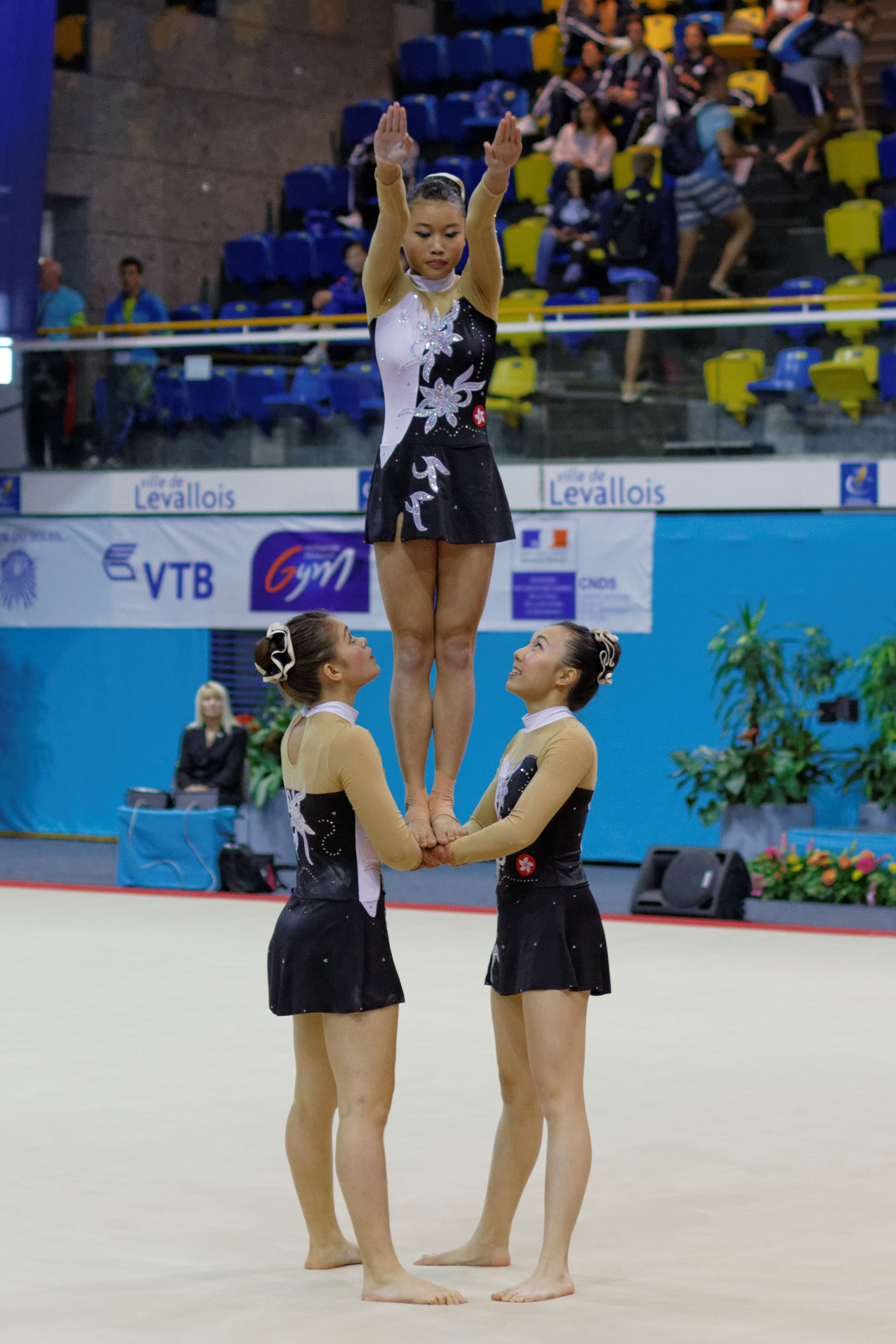
- Alternative name: Agnes Lam
- Nickname: Hoholam
- Born: November 5, 1998 (age 27)
- Height: 1.60 m (5 ft 3 in)

Gymnastics career
- Discipline: Acrobatic gymnastics
- Country represented: Hong Kong
- Head coach: Lai Cheung Lik
- Music: Balanced - Heart Cry, Dynamics - Hanuman

Lam Ho Ching (born November 5, 1998) is a Hong Kong female acrobatic gymnast. With partners Carmen Gast and Ho Ching Lam, Lam Ho Ching competed in the 2014 Acrobatic Gymnastics World Championships.
