= Daniela Mehlhaff =

German acrobatic gymnast

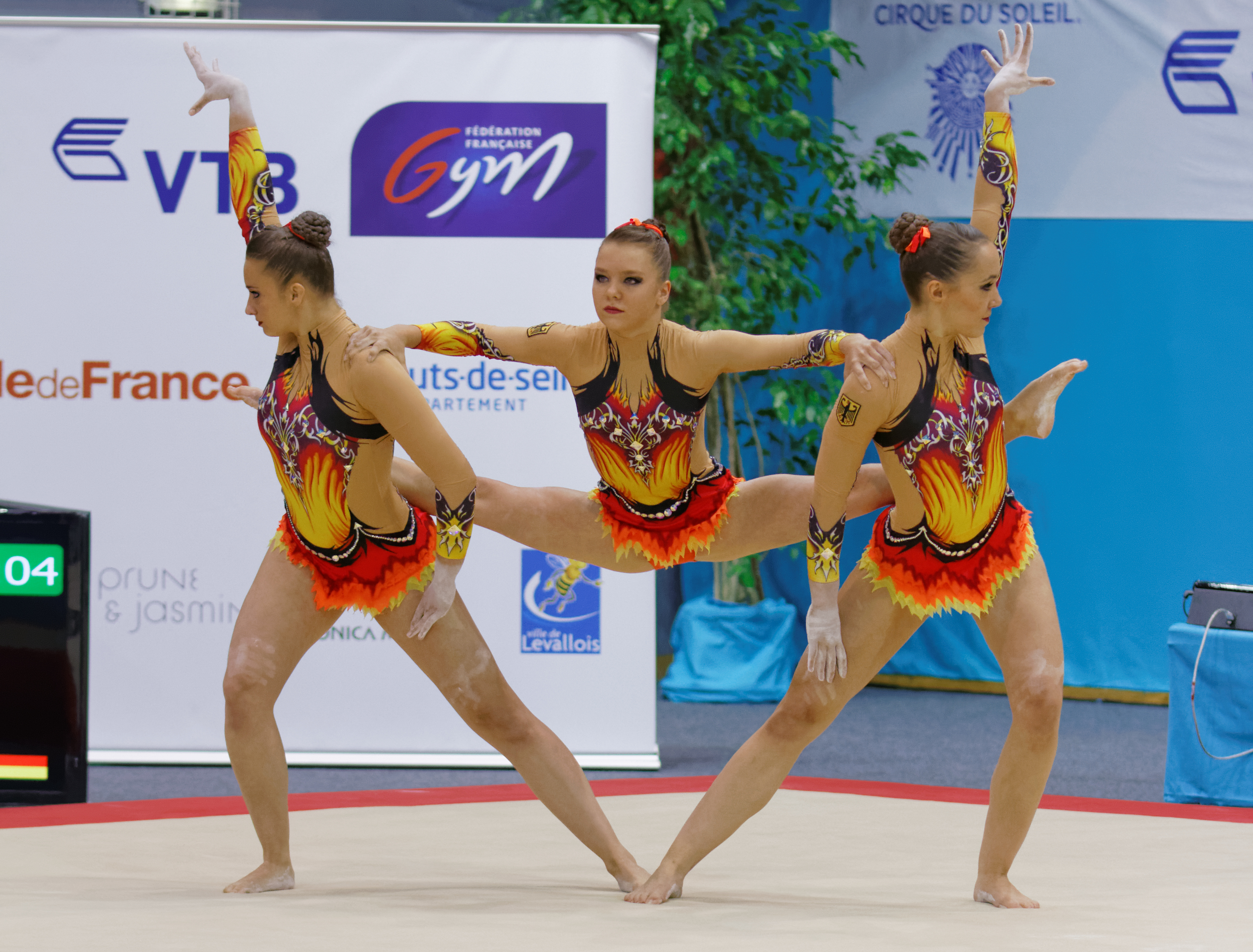

Personal information
- Born: 1 September 1996 (age 30)

Gymnastics career
- Discipline: Acrobatic gymnastics
- Country represented: Germany

Daniela Mehlhaff (born 1 September 1996) is a German female acrobatic gymnast. With partners Janina Hiller and Selina Frey-Sander, Mehlhaff competed in the 2014 Acrobatic Gymnastics World Championships.
