= Elodie Rousseau Forwood =

Australian acrobatic gymnast

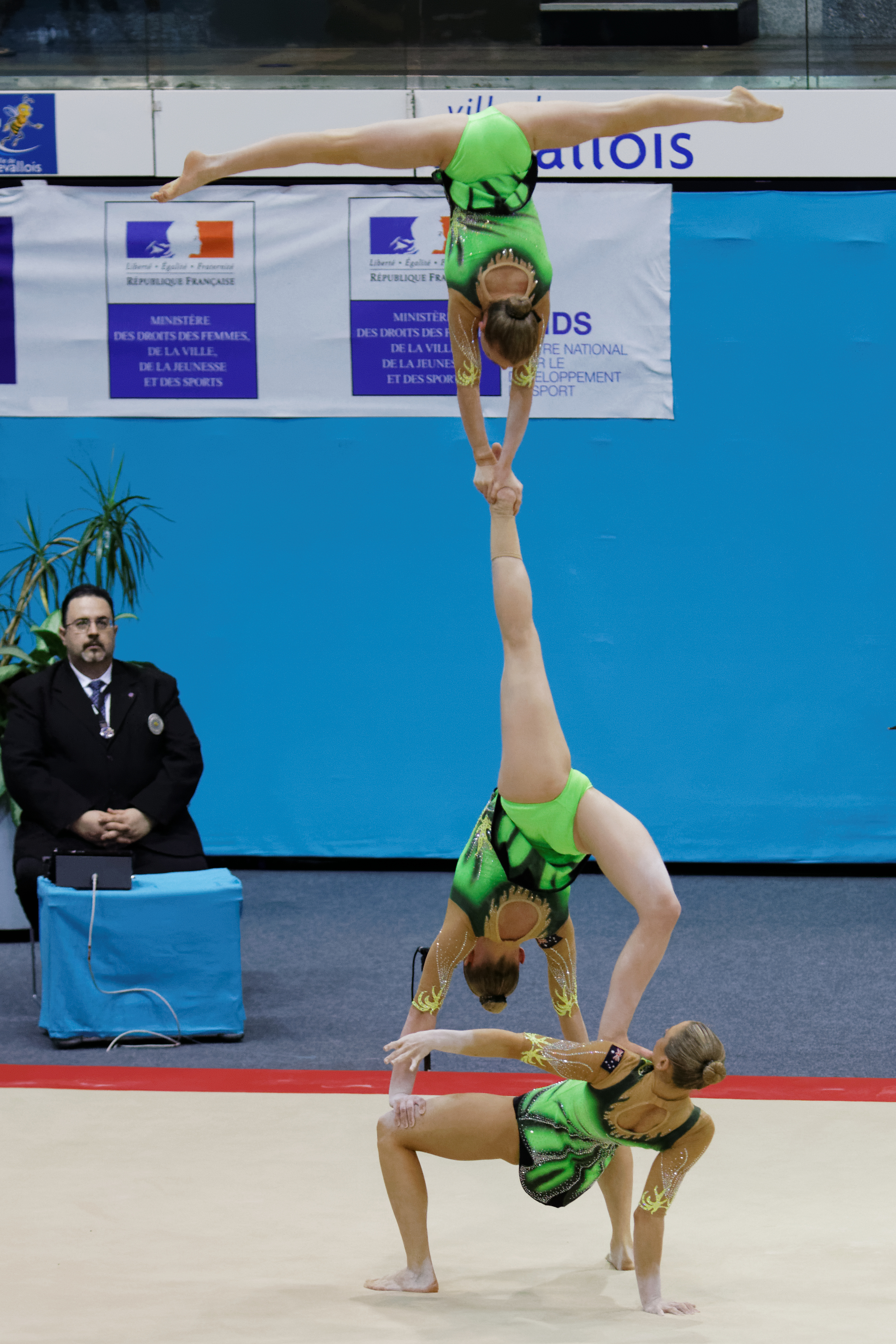

Personal information
- Nickname: El
- Born: 24 June 1998 (age 28) Brisbane, Australia
- Height: 151 cm (4 ft 11 in)

Gymnastics career
- Discipline: Acrobatic gymnastics
- Country represented: Australia
- Club: Robertson Gymnastics Academy
- Head coach: Yuriry
- Assistant coach: Olena
- Choreographer: Olena

Elodie Rousseau Forwood (born 24 June 1998) is an Australian female acrobatic gymnast. With partners Elizabeth Jacobs, Amy Lang and Rousseau Forwood achieved 6th in the 2014 Acrobatic Gymnastics World Championships.
