= Mei Hubnik =

Australian acrobatic gymnast

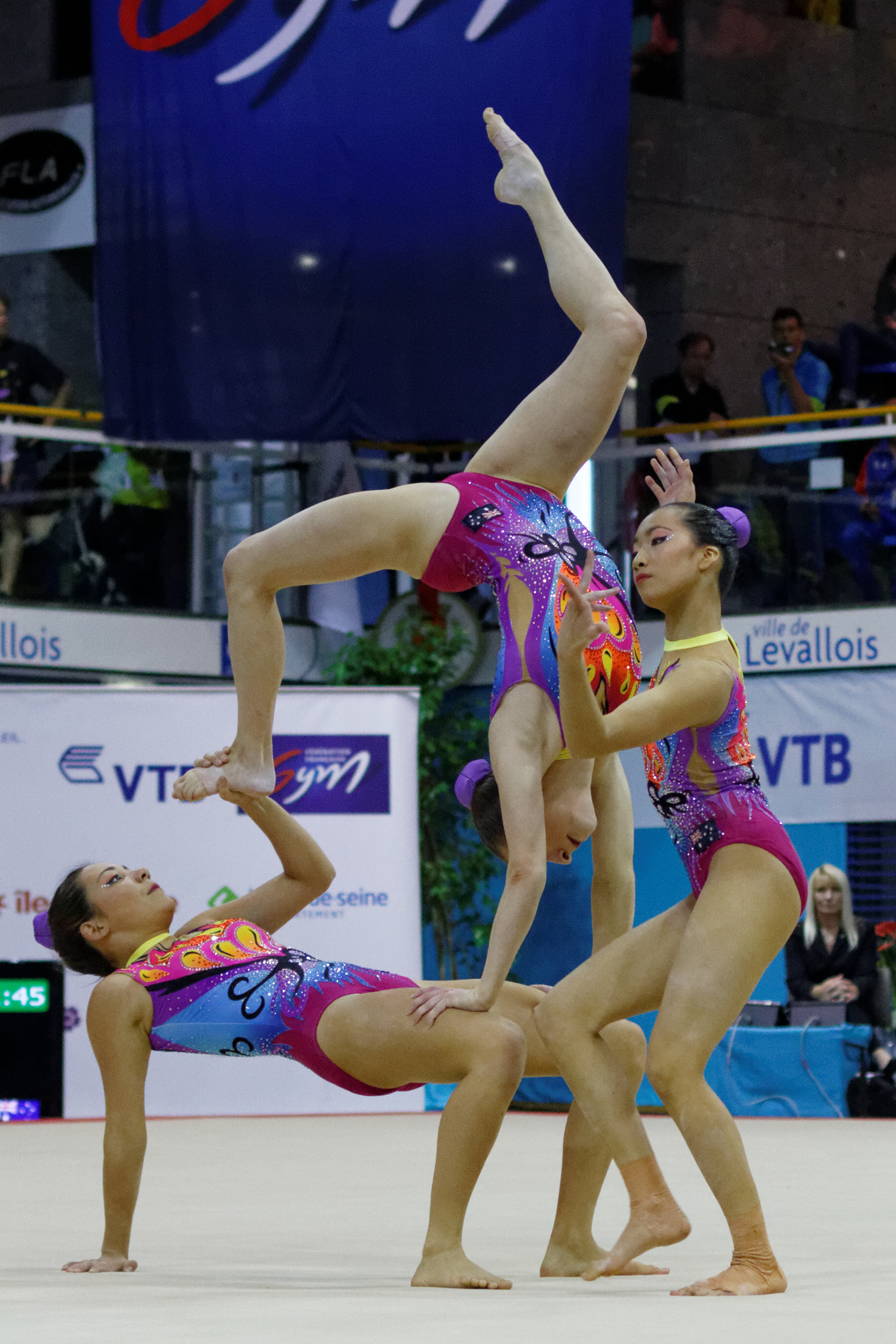
- Mei Hubnik, Madison Chan and Amber Kaldor at the 2014 Acrobatic Gymnastics World Championships

Personal information
- Born: 10 March 1995 (age 31)

Gymnastics career
- Discipline: Acrobatic gymnastics
- Country represented: Australia
- Club: SXL Gymnastics
- Head coach: Xi Lin Shen

Mei Hubnik (born 10 March 1995) is an Australian female acrobatic gymnast. With partners Amber Kaldor and Madison Chan, Hubnik achieved 15th in the 2014 Acrobatic Gymnastics World Championships.
