= Marta Śrutwa =

Polish acrobatic gymnast

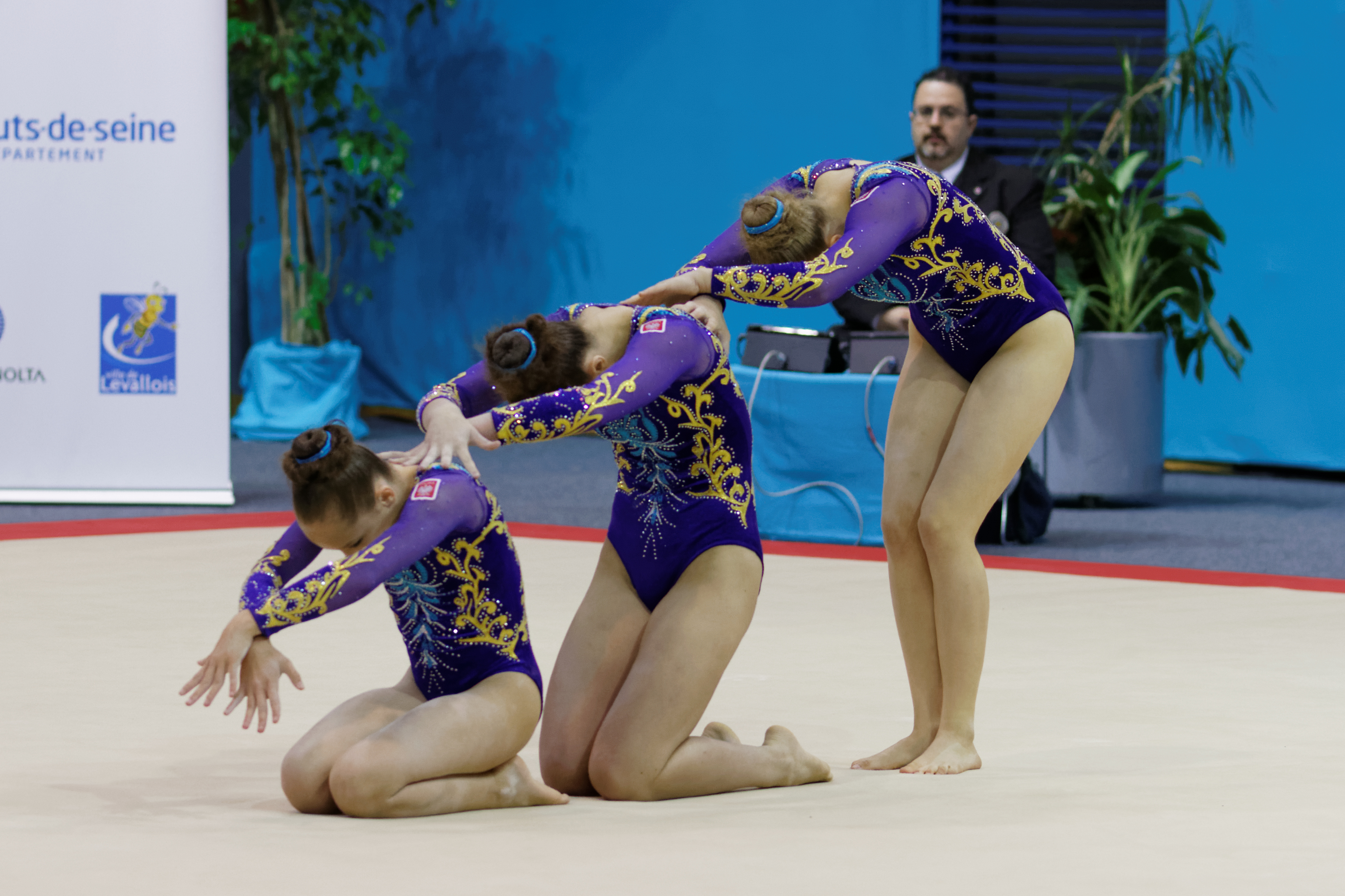

Personal information
- Born: 10 December 1997 (age 28)

Gymnastics career
- Discipline: Acrobatic gymnastics
- Country represented: Poland

Marta Śrutwa (born 10 December 1997) is a Polish female acrobatic gymnast. With partners Karolina Nowak and Agnieszka Rawinis, Srutwa competed in the 2014 Acrobatic Gymnastics World Championships. She is daughter of Mariusz Śrutwa.
