= Luise Zscheile =

German acrobatic gymnast

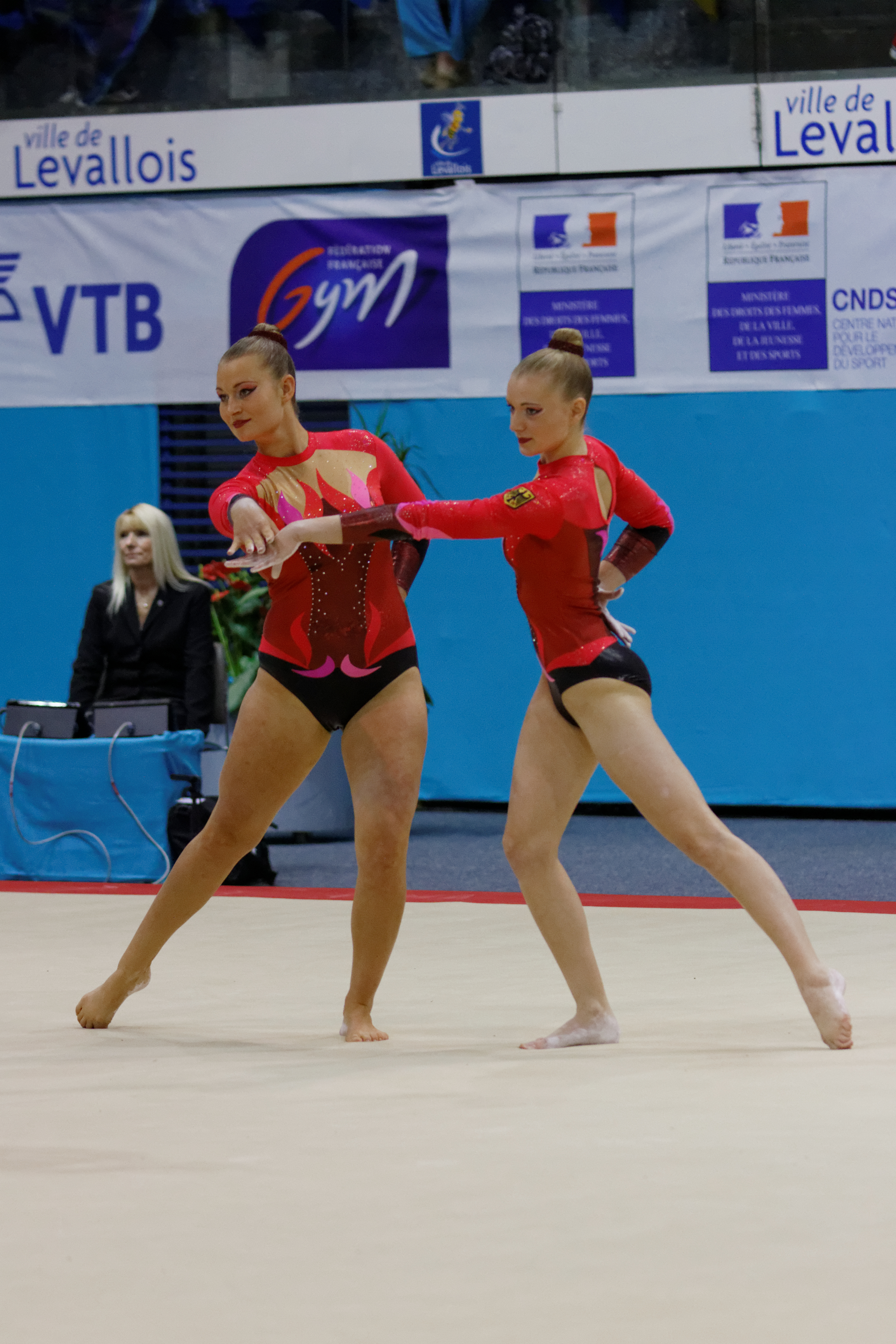

Personal information
- Born: 30 December 1993 (age 32)

Gymnastics career
- Discipline: Acrobatic gymnastics
- Country represented: Germany

Luise Zscheile (born 30 December 1993) is a German female acrobatic gymnast. With partners Nora Schaefer and Franca Schamber, Schaefer competed in the 2014 Acrobatic Gymnastics World Championships.
