= Elizabeth Jacobs (gymnast) =

Australian acrobatic gymnast

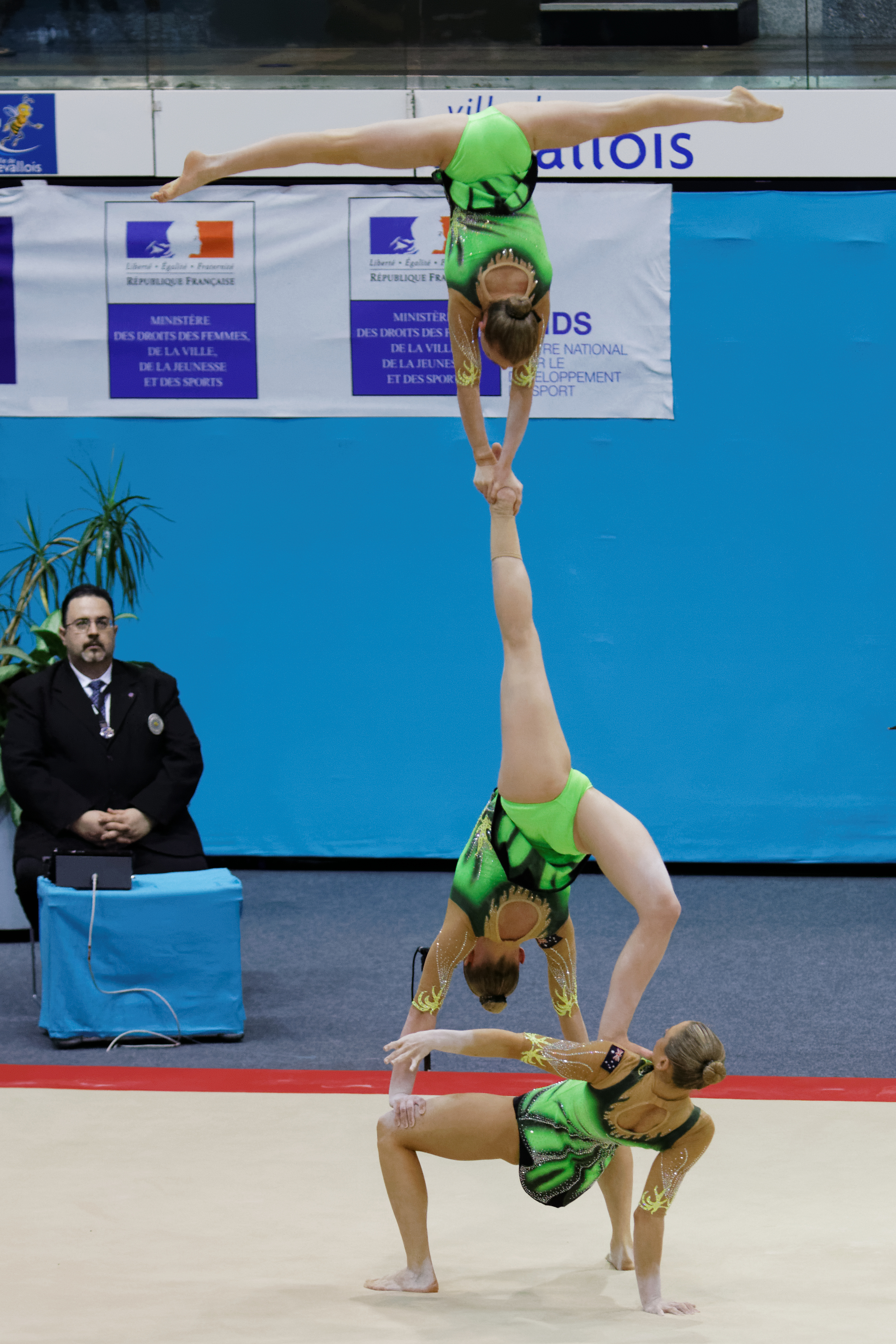

Personal information
- Born: 26 February 1989 (age 37) Brisbane

Gymnastics career
- Discipline: Acrobatic gymnastics
- Country represented: Australia
- Club: Robertson Gymnastics Club

Elizabeth Jacobs (born 26 February 1989) is an Australian female acrobatic gymnast. With partners Amy Lang and Elodie Rousseau Forwood, Jacobs achieved 6th in the 2014 Acrobatic Gymnastics World Championships.
