= Nino Diasamidze =

Georgian acrobatic gymnast

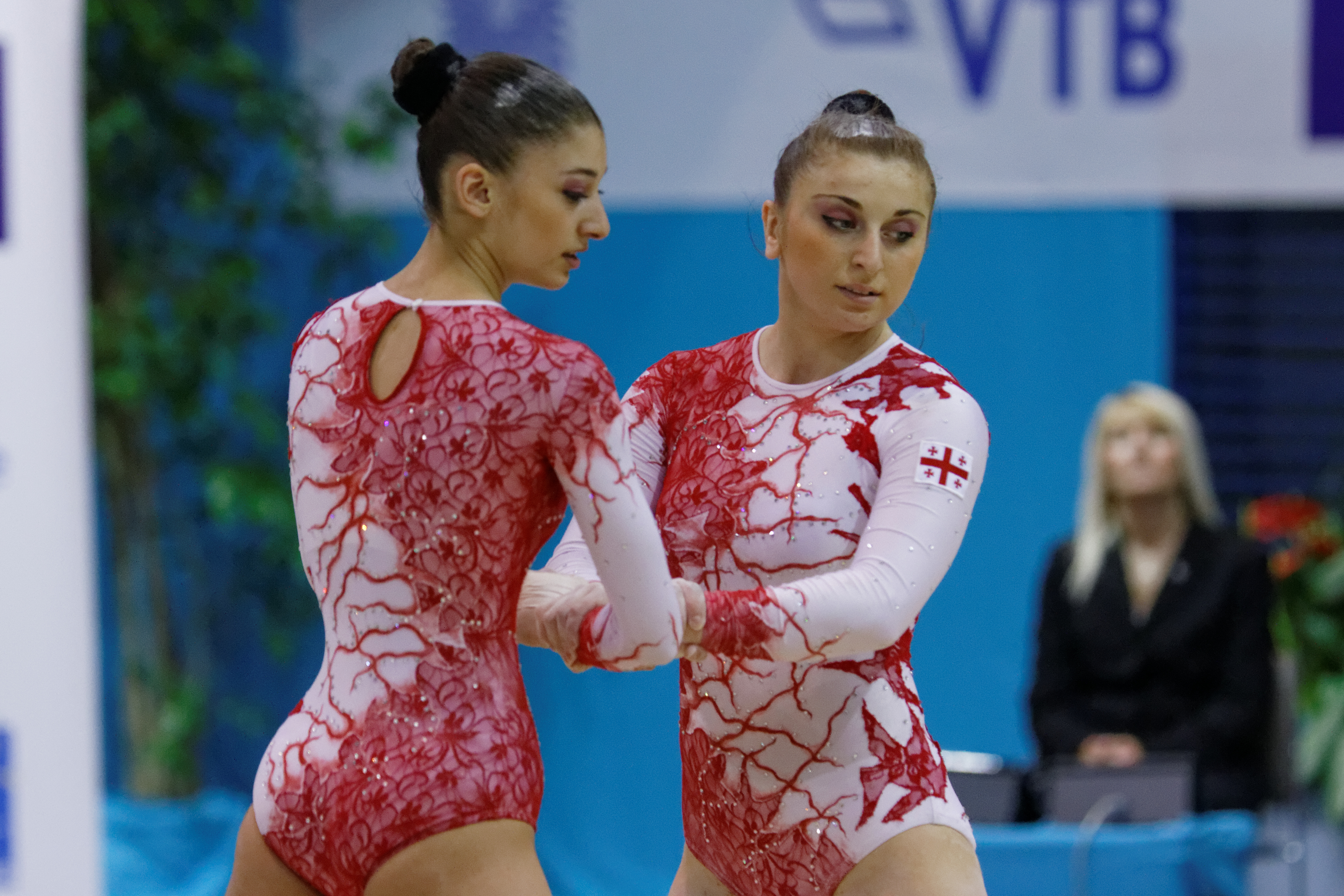
- Nino Diasamidze and Mariam Gigolashvili at the 2014 Acrobatic Gymnastics World Championships

Personal information
- Born: 4 December 1992 (age 33)

Gymnastics career
- Discipline: Acrobatic gymnastics
- Country represented: Georgia

Nino Diasamidze (born 4 December 1992) is a Georgian acrobatic gymnast. With partners Mariam Gigolashvili and Magda Rusia, Diasamidze competed in the 2014 Acrobatic Gymnastics World Championships.
