= Ho Ching Lam =

Hong Kong acrobatic gymnast

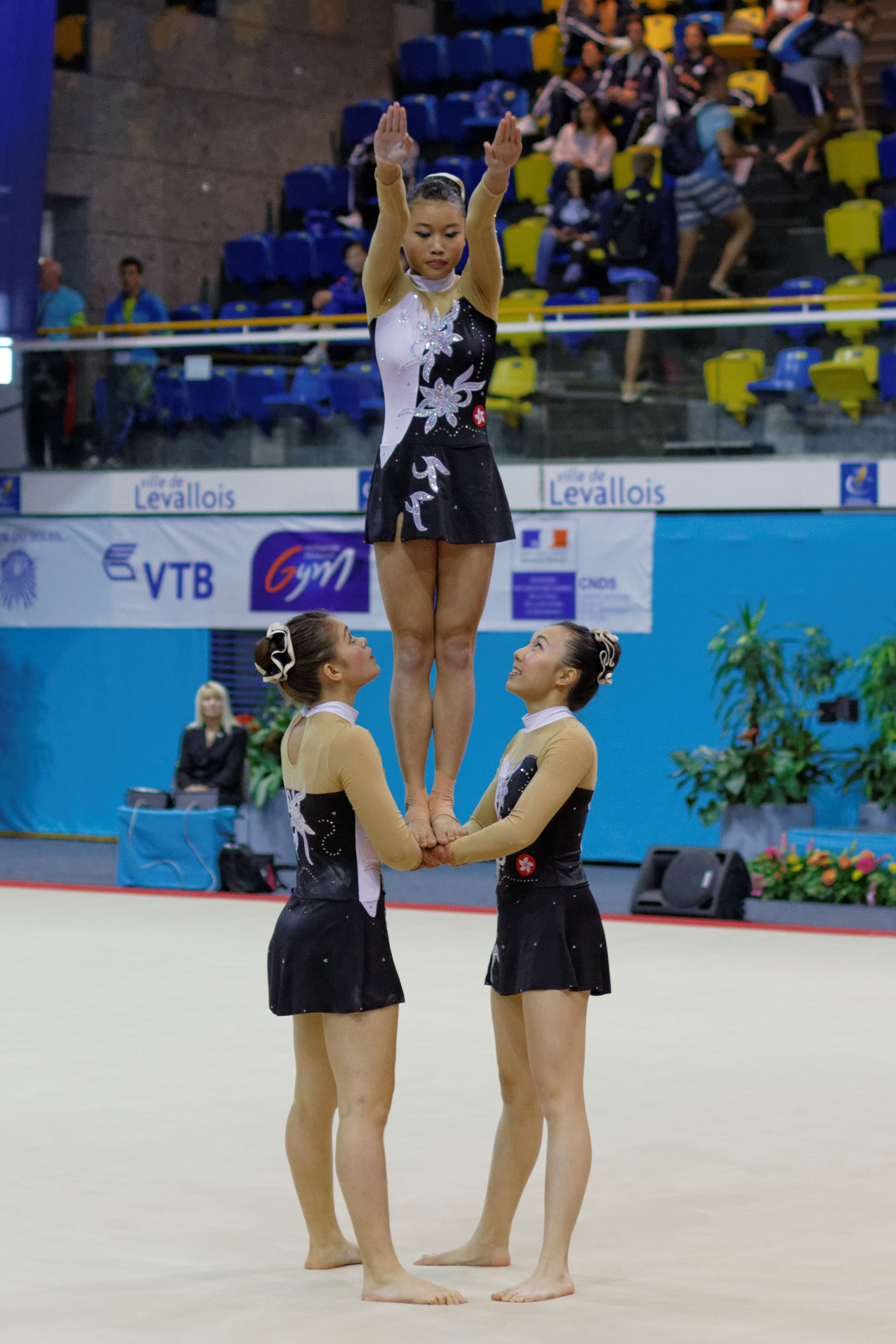

Personal information
- Nickname: Tiffany

Gymnastics career
- Discipline: Acrobatic gymnastics
- Country represented: Hong Kong
- Head coach: Lai Cheung Lik
- Music: Balanced - Heart Cry, Dynamics - Hanuman

Ho Ching Lam is a Hong Kong female acrobatic gymnast. With partners Carmen Gast and Lam Ho Ching, Ho Ching Lam competed in the 2014 Acrobatic Gymnastics World Championships.
