= Emily Ruppert =

American acrobatic gymnast

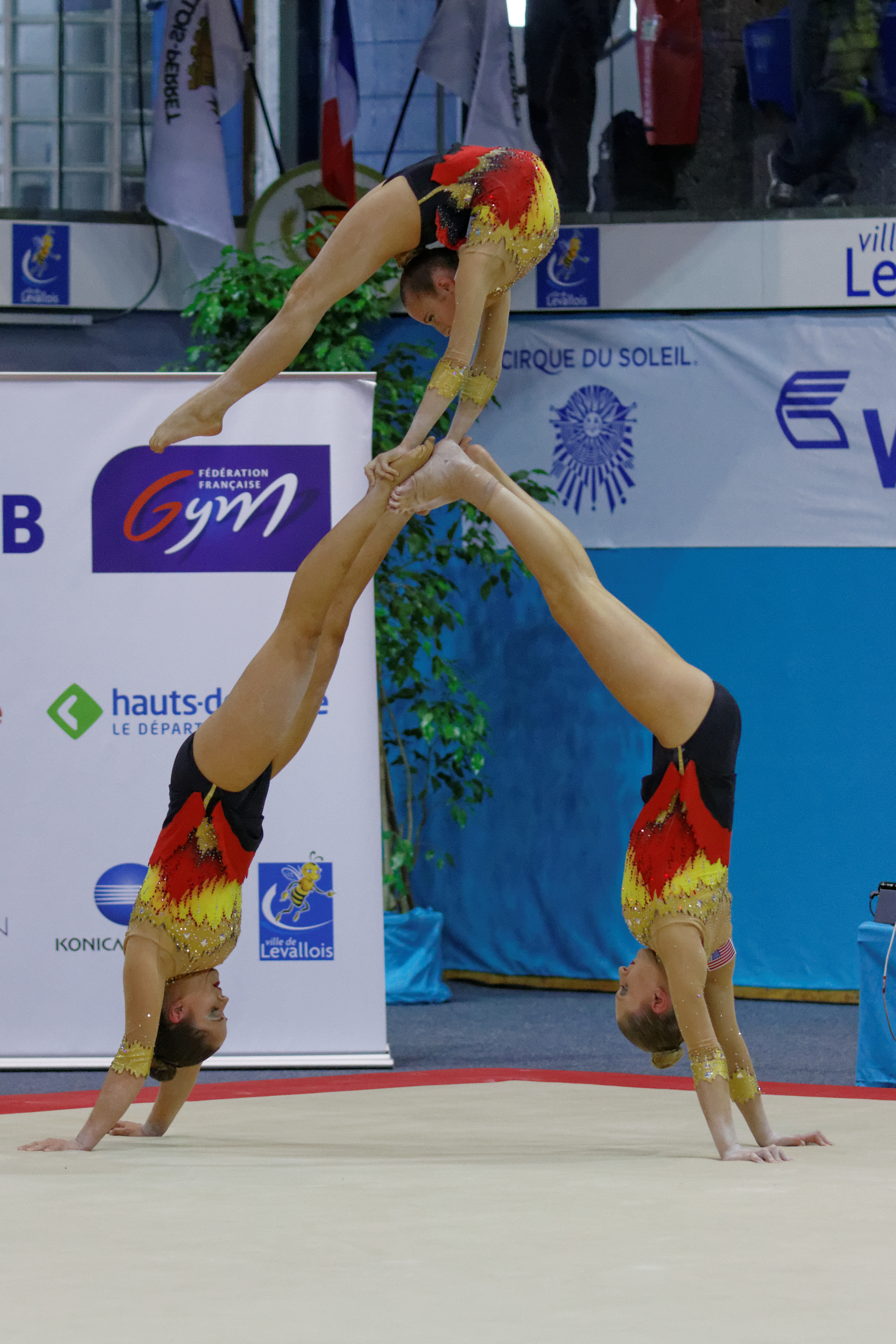
- Emily Ruppert (left), Hannah Silverman and Christina Antoniades

Personal information
- Born: November 3, 1993 (age 32)

Gymnastics career
- Discipline: Acrobatic gymnastics
- Country represented: United States

Emily Ruppert is an American female acrobatic gymnast. With partners Christina Antoniades and Hannah Silverman, Ruppert competed in the 2014 Acrobatic Gymnastics World Championships. Emily was born in Baltimore, MD and began gymnastics in 2005.

- National Competition Results:

2014 USA Gymnastics Championships, Louisville, Ky. - 1st-AA
2014 Acro Cup, Huntsville, Texas - 1st-AA
2013 U.S. Acrobatic Championships, Louisville, Ky. - 1st-AA
2013 Acro Cup, Kearney, Mo. - 2nd-AA
2012 National Championships, Detroit, Mich. - 1st-AA
2011 National Championships, San Jose, Calif. - 3rd-AA

- International Competition Results

2014 World Championships, Levallois, France -
2012 Gutenberg Cup, Mainz, Germany - 1st-AA
2012 World Age Group Competition, Lake Buena Vista, Fla. - 7th-AA
2011 British Open Tournament, Stoke on Trent, England - 4th-COMB, 2nd-BL, 4th-DY
2011 Geneva Acro Cup, Geneva, Switzerland - 2nd-AA, 2nd-BL, 3rd-DY
