= Karolina Nowak =

Polish acrobatic gymnast

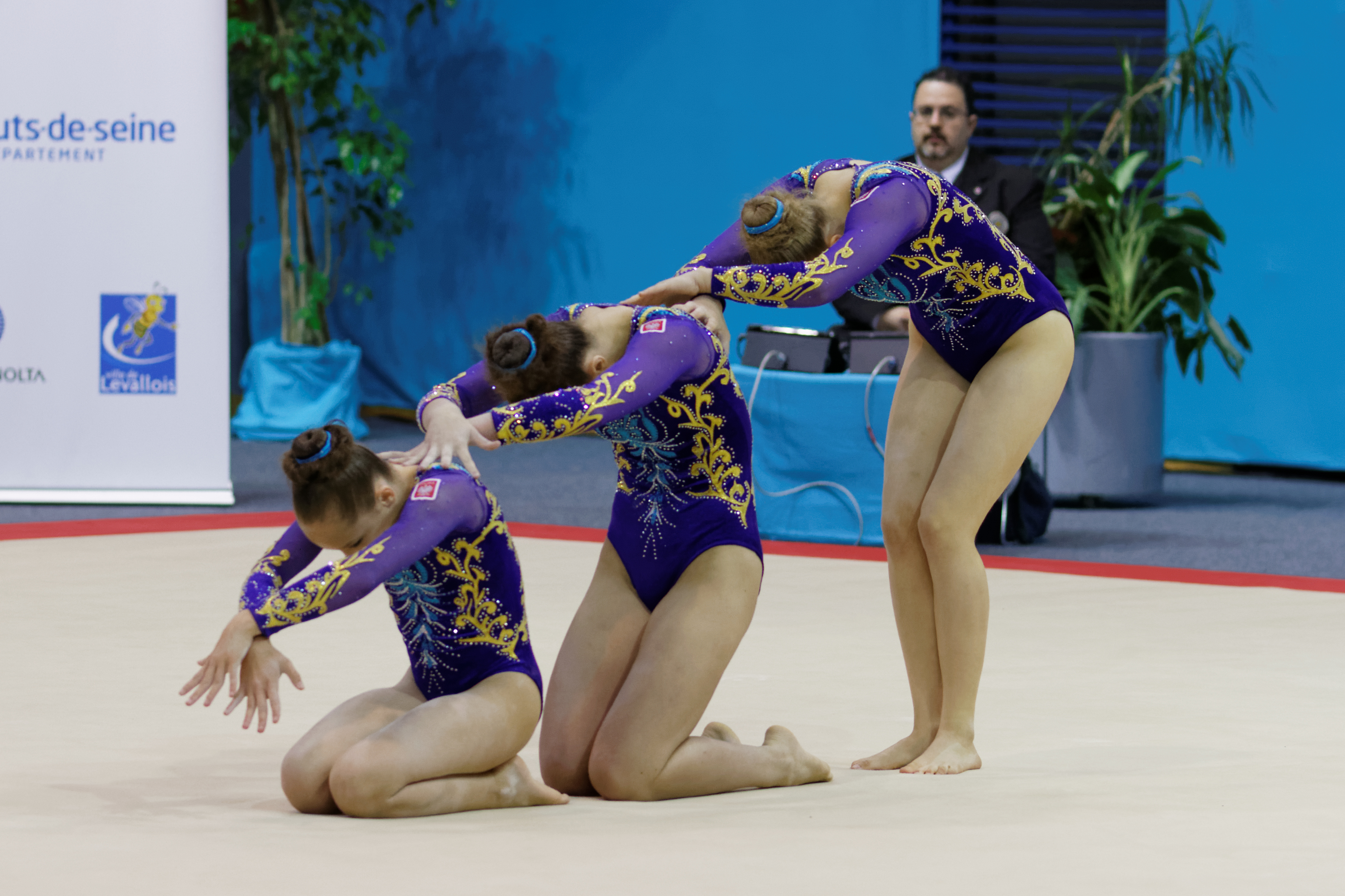

Personal information
- Born: 1 November 1999 (age 26)

Gymnastics career
- Discipline: Acrobatic gymnastics
- Country represented: Poland

Karolina Nowak (born 1 November 1999) is a Polish female acrobatic gymnast. With partners Marta Srutwa and Agnieszka Rawinis, Nowak competed in the 2014 Acrobatic Gymnastics World Championships.
