= Josephine Russell =

British female acrobatic gymnast

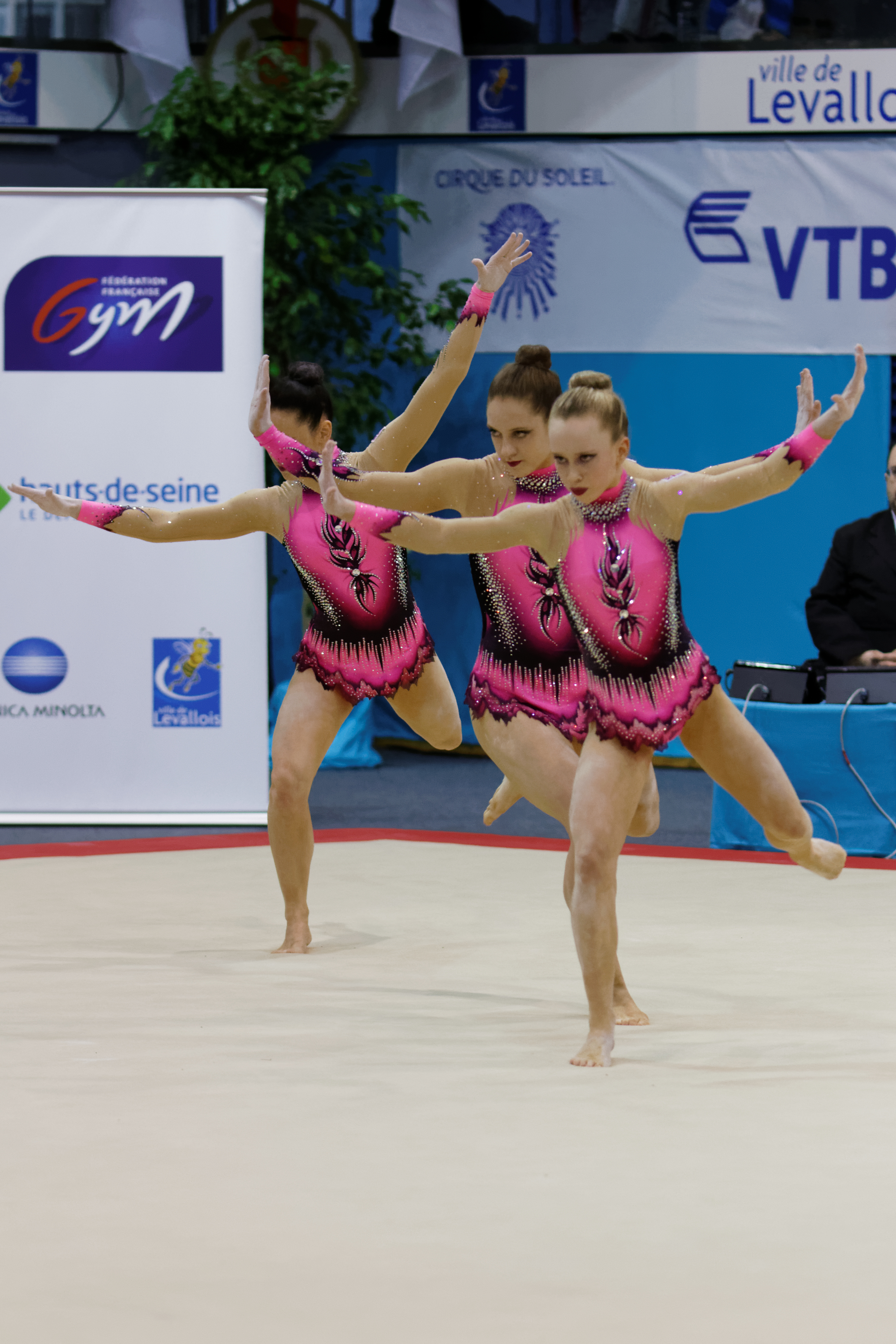

Personal information
- Born: 9 November 1994 (age 31)

Gymnastics career
- Discipline: Acrobatic gymnastics
- Country represented: Great Britain

Josephine Russell (born 9 November 1994) is a British female acrobatic gymnast. With partners Jennifer Bailey and Cicely Irwin, Russell competed in the 2014 Acrobatic Gymnastics World Championships.
