= Amy Lang =

Australian acrobatic gymnast

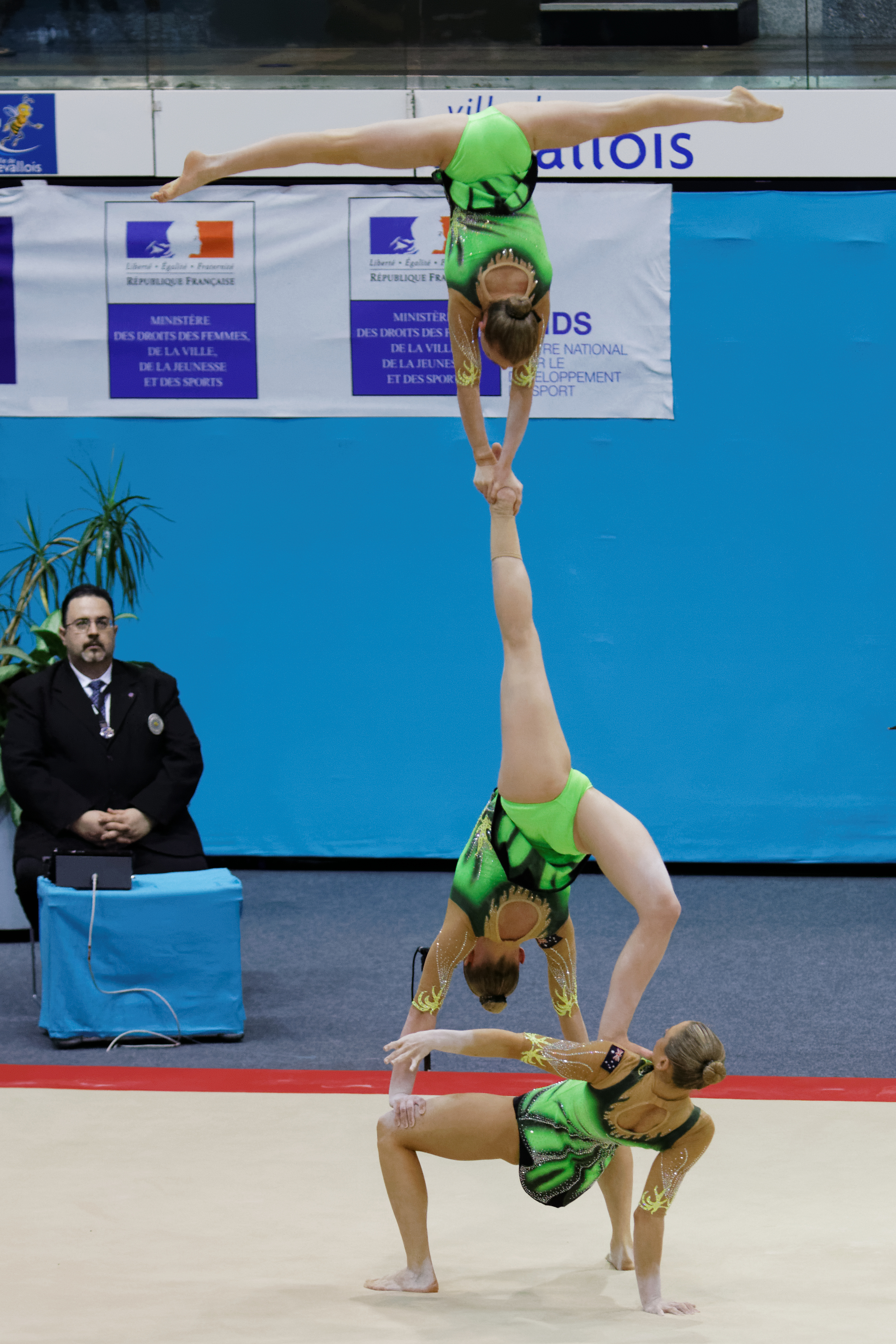

Personal information
- Born: 13 August 1991 (age 35)

Gymnastics career
- Discipline: Acrobatic gymnastics
- Country represented: Australia
- Club: Robertson Gymnastics Club

Amy Lang (born 13 August 1991) is an Australian female acrobatic gymnast. With partners Elizabeth Jacobs and Elodie Rousseau Forwood, Lang achieved 6th in the 2014 Acrobatic Gymnastics World Championships.
