= Natalia Lavrukhina =

Russian acrobatic gymnast (born 1987)

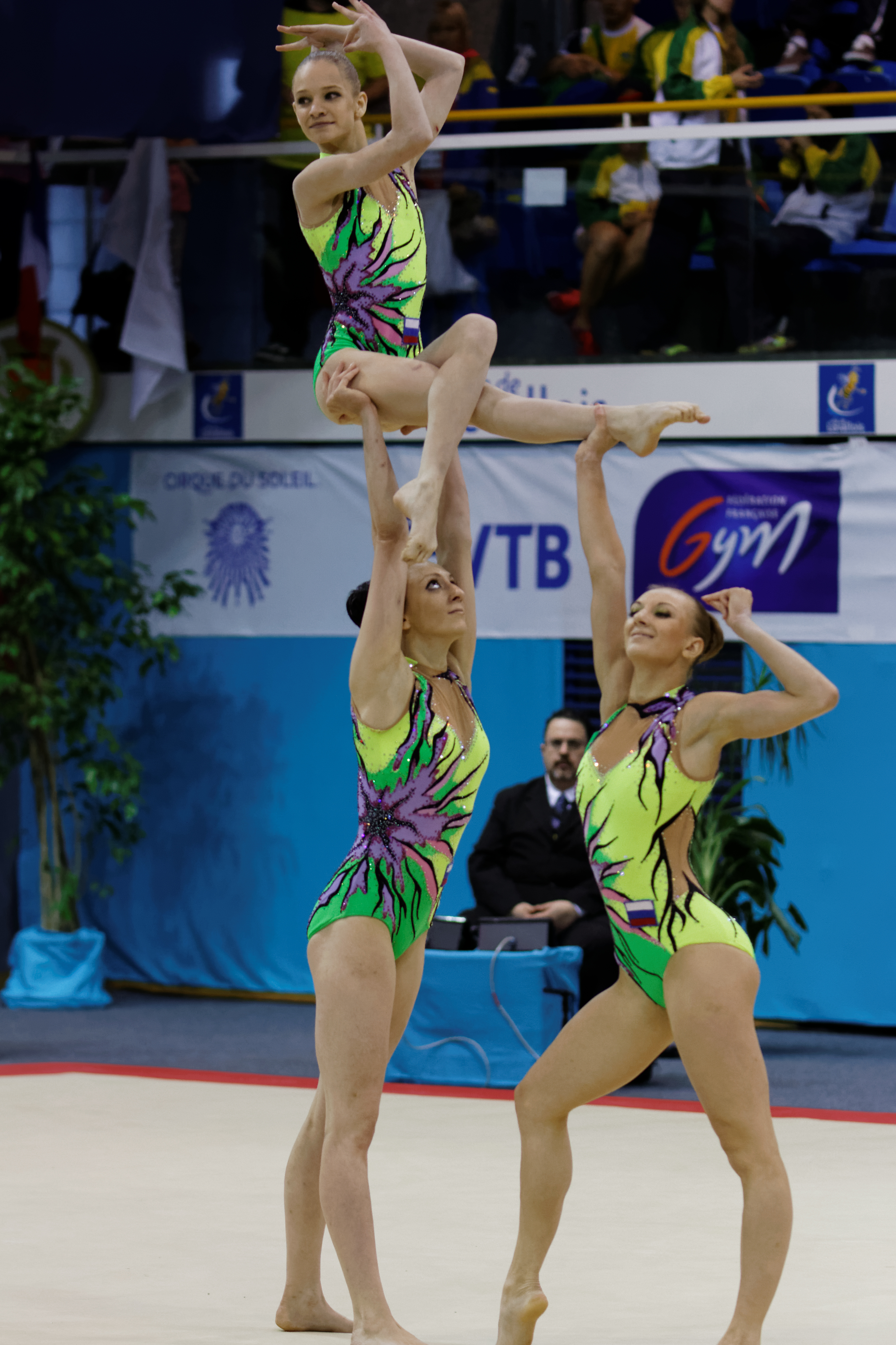

Personal information
- Born: 12 November 1987 (age 38)

Gymnastics career
- Discipline: Acrobatic gymnastics
- Country represented: Russia

Natalia Lavrukhina (born 12 November 1987) is a Russian female acrobatic gymnast. With partners Victoria Sukhareva and Natalia Solodinina, Lavrukhina competed in the 2014 Acrobatic Gymnastics World Championships.
