= 2014 Acrobatic Gymnastics World Championships – Women's pairs qualification =

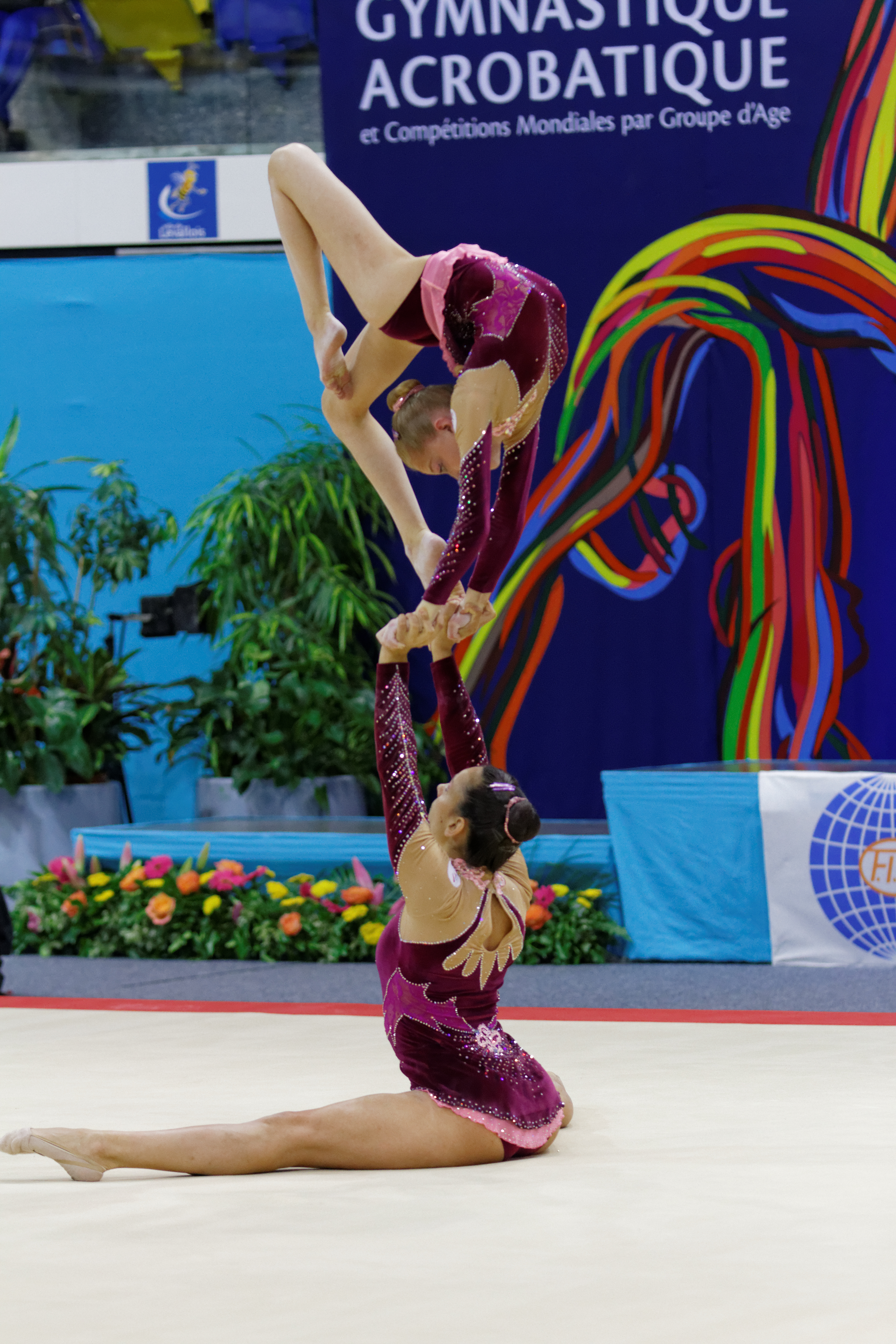
French pair

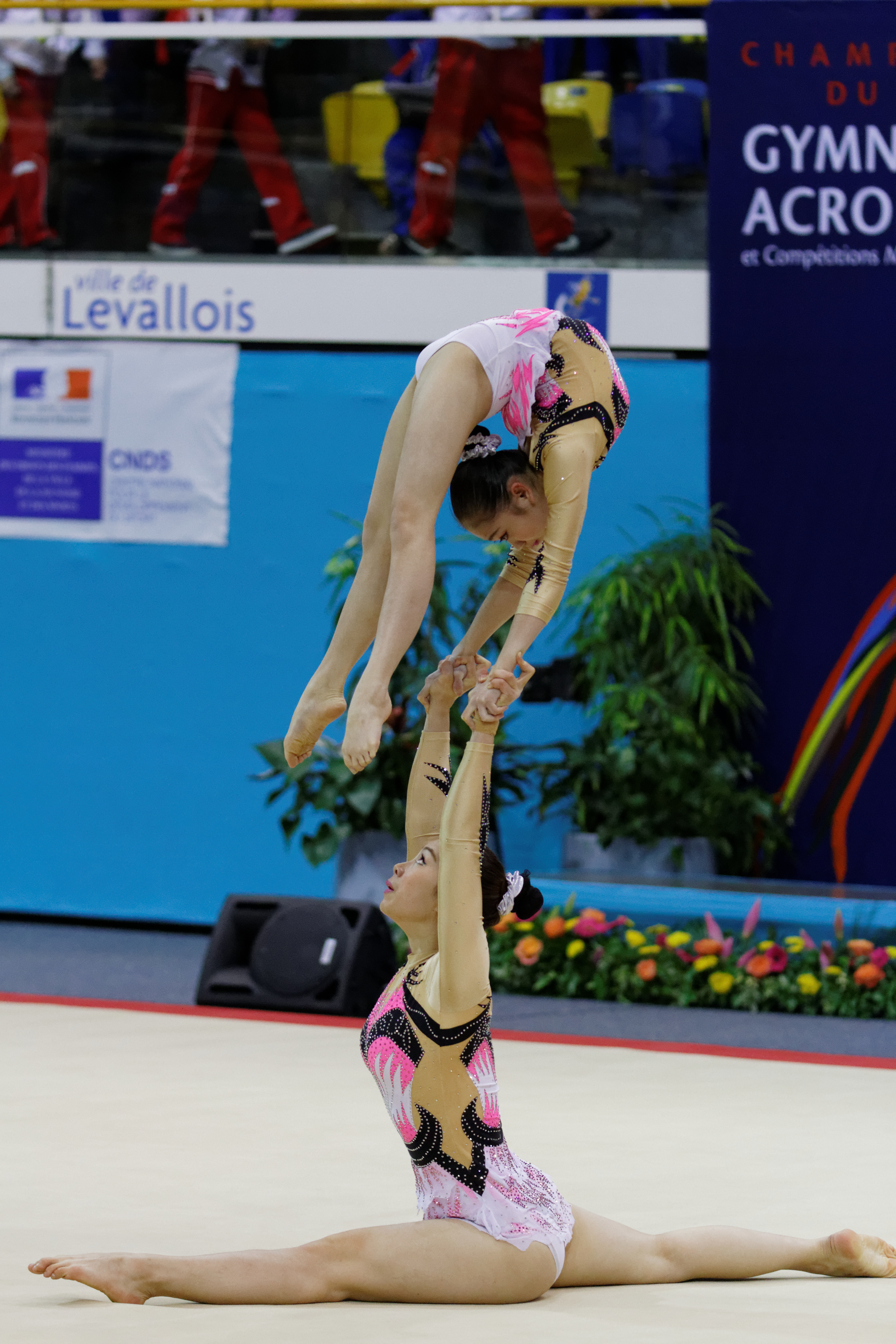
Chinese pair

The 24th World Acrobatic Gymnastics Championships were held in Levallois-Perret, France at the Palais des Sports Marcel-Cerdan. The women's pairs qualifications were held on 10 and 11 July 2014.

Position	Team	Balance	Dynamic	Combined	Total	Qual.
1	Belgium; Nikki Snel; Eline de Smedt	28.210	27.920	27.925	84.055	Q
2	Belarus; Marharyta Bartashevich; Viktoriya Mikhnovich	27.760	27.890	27.240	82.890	Q
3	Russia; Valentina Kim; Elizaveta Dubrovina	27.945	27.180	26.465	81.590	Q
4	Ukraine; Anastasiia Veresova; Ella Bohdanova	25.755	26.985	26.430	79.170	Q
5	France; Claire Philouze; Léa Roussel	27.690	24.950	26.380	79.020	Q
6	North Korea; Jong Kum Hwa; Kim Hye Song	24.770	27.180	26.800	78.750	Q
7	China; Zhang Zhiyun; Mo Zhixin	26.470	26.725	26.470	78.665	R
8	Russia; Ekaterina Mischchenko; Ksenia Sidelnikova	24.757			24.575	-
