= Bohdanova =

Bohdanova or Bohdanová may refer to:

- Bohdanova, feminine form of the surname Bohdanov
- Bohdanová, feminine form of the surname Bohdan (name)
- Blanka Bohdanová (1930–2021), Czech actress
- Ella Bohdanova (born 1996), Ukrainian acrobatic gymnast
