= Kholod (surname) =

Kholod (Холод) is an Eastern Slavic surname. Notable people with the surname include:

- Alena Kholod (born 1995), Russian acrobatic gymnast
- Artem Kholod (born 2000), Ukrainian footballer
- Vitaliy Kholod (born 2004), Ukrainian footballer
