= 2014 Acrobatic Gymnastics World Championships – Men's group qualification =

The 24th World Acrobatic Gymnastics Championships were held in Levallois-Perret, France at the Palais des Sports Marcel-Cerdan. The men's groups qualifications were held on 10, 11 and 12 July 2014.

Position	Team	Balance	Dynamic	Combined	Total	Qual.
1	China; Zhou Yi; Wang Lei; Tang Jian; Wu Yeqiuyin	28.080	28.900	29.770	86.750	Q
2	United Kingdom; Connor Bartlett; Gareth Wood; Daniel Cook; George Wood	29.030	27.050	29.480	86.560	Q
3	Russia; Valentin Chetverkin; Maksim Chulkov; Aleksandr Kurasov; Dmitry Bryzgalov	28.845	28.160	28.525	85.530	Q
4	Russia	25.535	27.790	28.010	81.335	-
5	Bulgaria; Dennis Andreev; Borislav Borisov; Vladislav Borisov; Hristo Dimitrov	27.075	27.200	26.820	81.260	Q
6	Ukraine; Andrii Kozynko; Oleksandr Nelep; Oleksii Lesyk; Viktor Iaremchuk	23.920	27.790	26.820	78.530	Q
7	Poland; Tomasz Antonowicz; Jakub Kosowicz; Wojciech Krysiak; Radoslaw Trojan	24.580	26.190	25.530	76.300	Q
8	Germany	24.660	25.530	25.750	75.940	R
9	Kazakhstan	25.240	24.800	22.485	72.525	R
10	Hong Kong	18.750	19.100	14.875	52.725	-
11	Belarus	23.820	24.790	-	48.610	-
