= Zhang Shaolong =

Chinese acrobatic gymnast

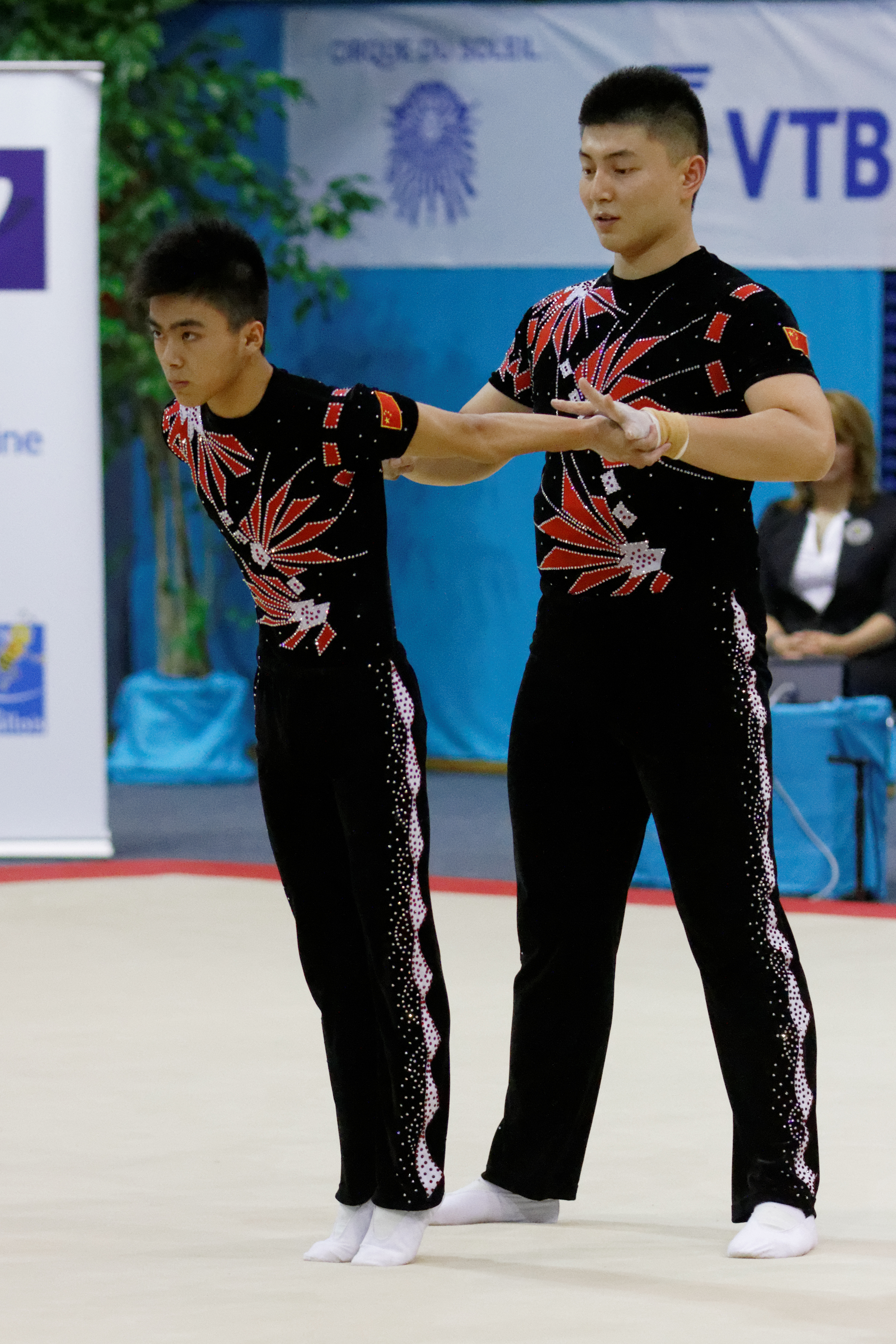
- Zhang Shaolong (right) and Li Ziyang at the 2014 Acrobatic Gymnastics World Championships

Personal information
- Born: March 21, 1989 (age 37)

Gymnastics career
- Discipline: Acrobatic gymnastics
- Country represented: China

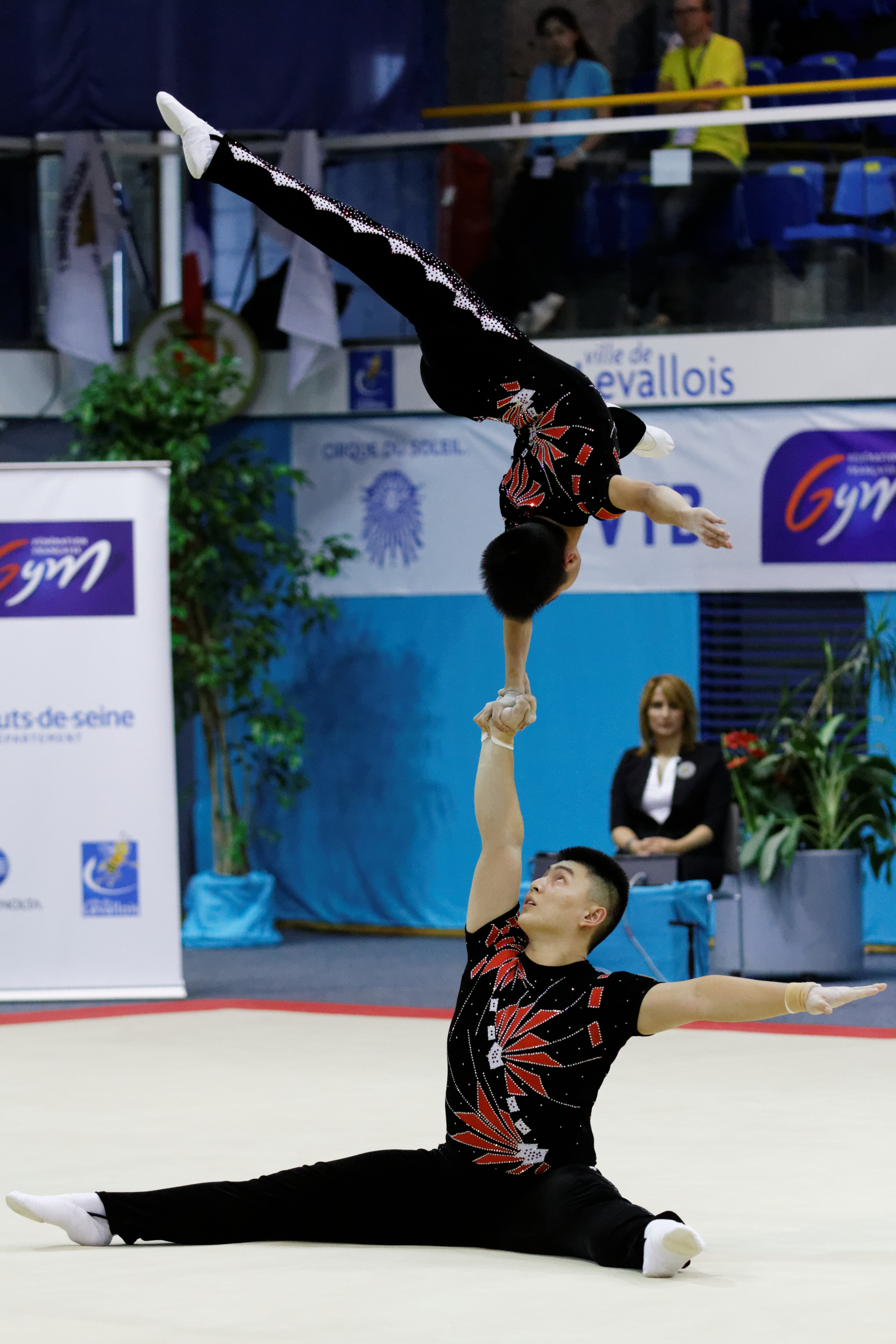
Zhang Shaolong (bottom) and Li Ziyang at the 2014 Acrobatic Gymnastics World Championships.

Zhang Shaolong (born March 21, 1989) is a Chinese male acrobatic gymnast. Along with his partner, Li Ziyang, he finished 5th in the 2014 Acrobatic Gymnastics World Championships.
