= Wu Wenhui =

Chinese acrobatic gymnast

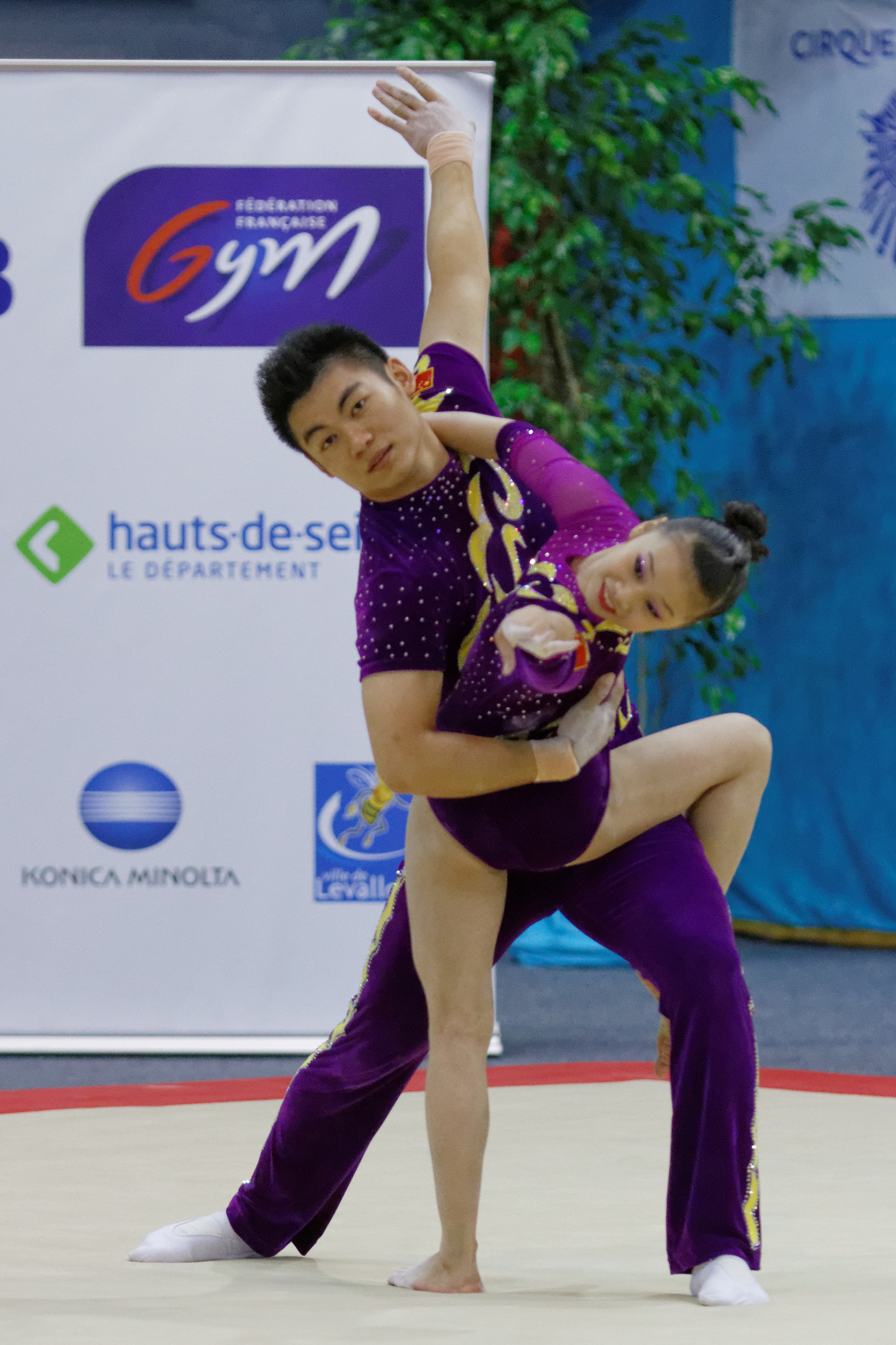
- Wu Wenhui and her partner Shen Yunyun

Personal information
- Born: April 27, 1998 (age 28)

Gymnastics career
- Discipline: Acrobatic gymnastics
- Country represented: China

Wu Wenhui (born April 27, 1998) is a Chinese female acrobatic gymnast. Along with her partner, Shen Yunyun, she finished 5th in the 2014 Acrobatic Gymnastics World Championships.
