= Ri Jin-hwa =

North Korean gymnast

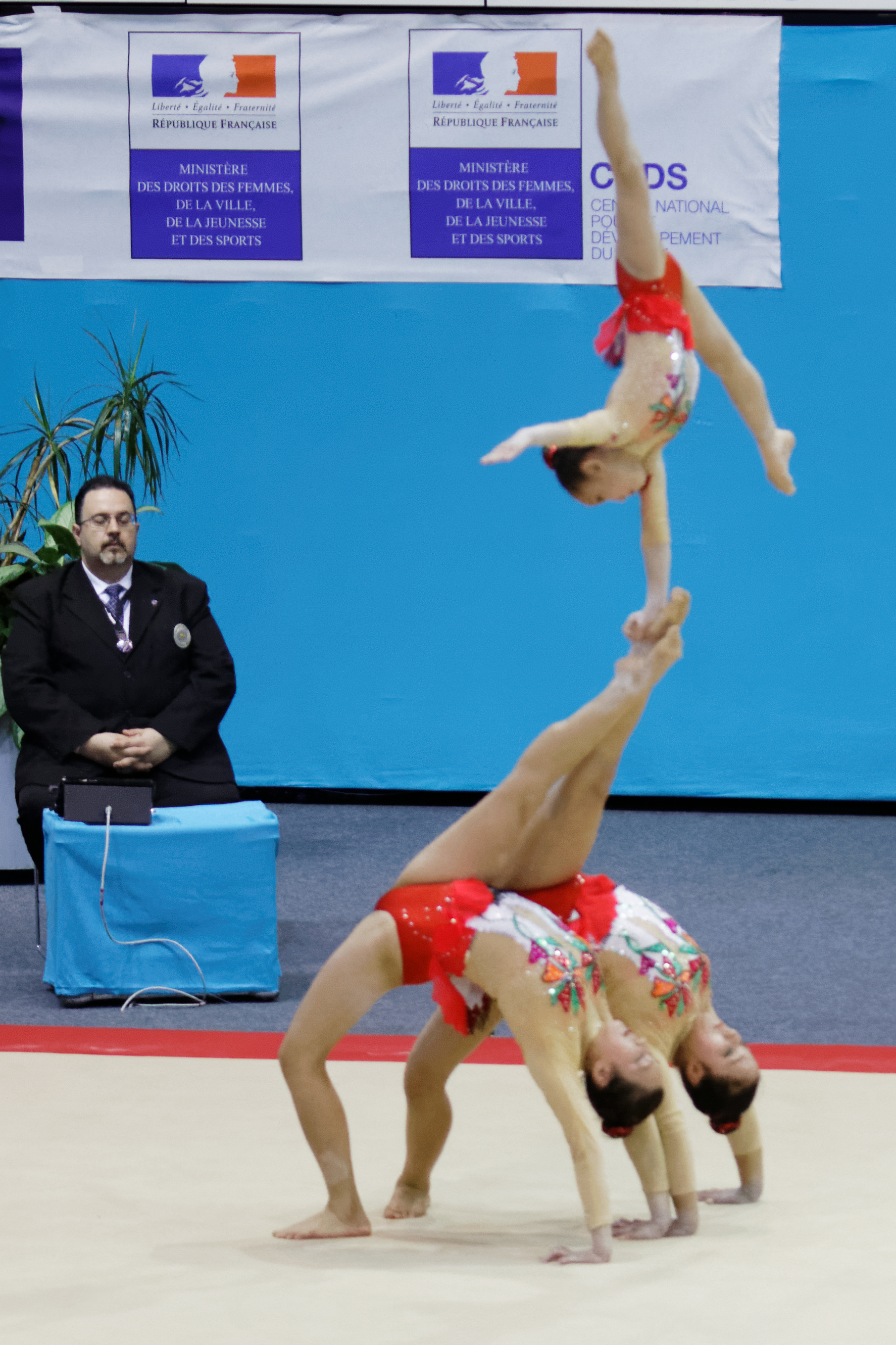

Personal information
- Born: September 24, 1988 (age 37)

Gymnastics career
- Discipline: Acrobatic gymnastics
- Country represented: North Korea

Korean name
- Hangul: 리진화
- RR: Ri Jinhwa
- MR: Ri Chinhwa

Ri Jin-hwa (born September 24, 1988) is a North Korean female acrobatic gymnast. With partners Ri Hyang and Kim Un-sol, Ri achieved 4th in the 2014 Acrobatic Gymnastics World Championships.
