= Kim Un-sol =

North Korean gymnast (born 1998)

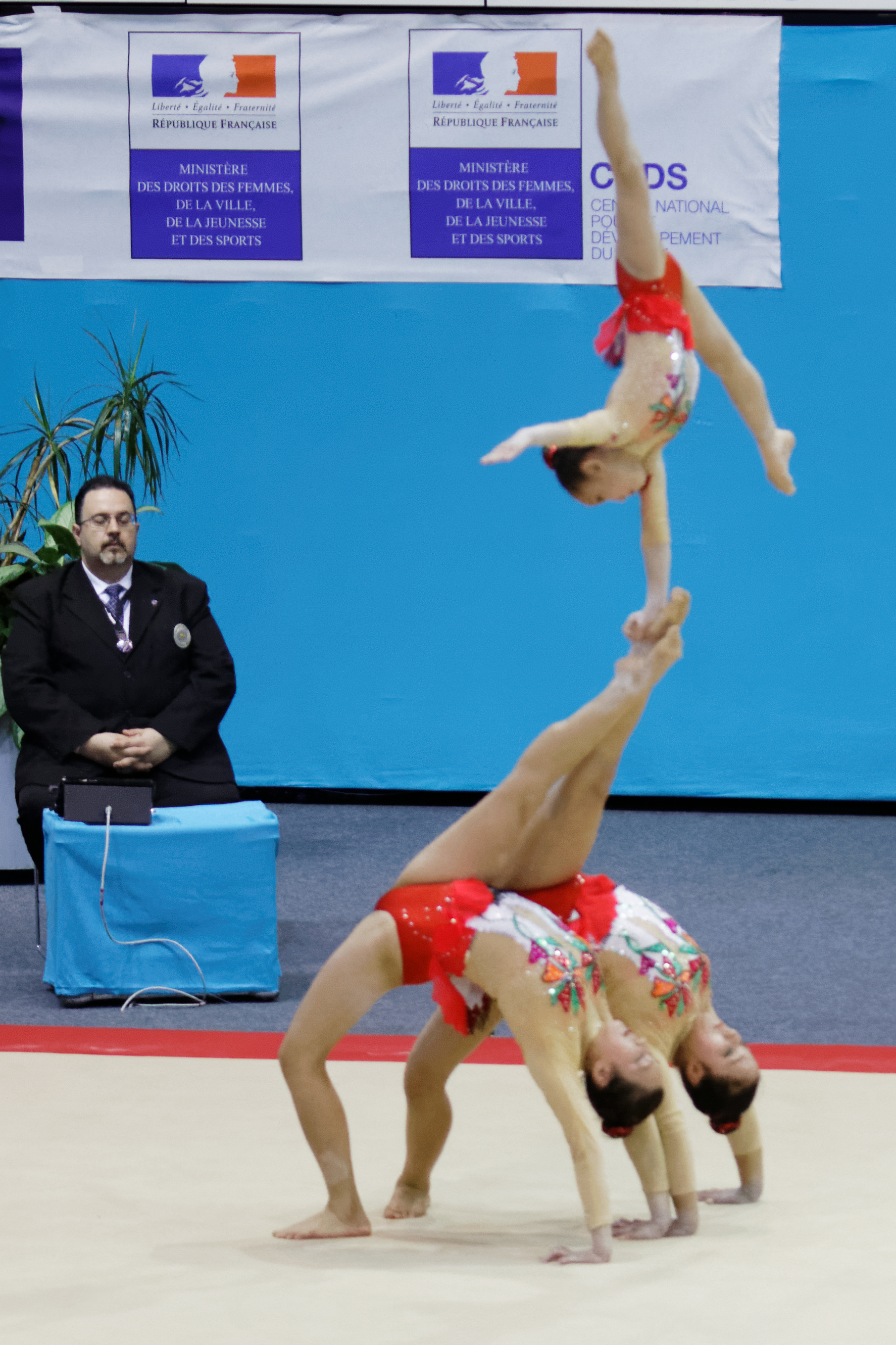

Personal information
- Born: May 7, 1998 (age 28)

Gymnastics career
- Discipline: Acrobatic gymnastics
- Country represented: North Korea

Kim Un-sol (Korean: 김은솔; born May 7, 1998) is a North Korean female acrobatic gymnast. With partners Ri Hyang and Ri Jin-hwa, Kim achieved 4th in the 2014 Acrobatic Gymnastics World Championships and 2nd in the 2015 Asian Acrobatic Gymnastics Championships.
