= Kieran Whittle =

British acrobatic gymnast

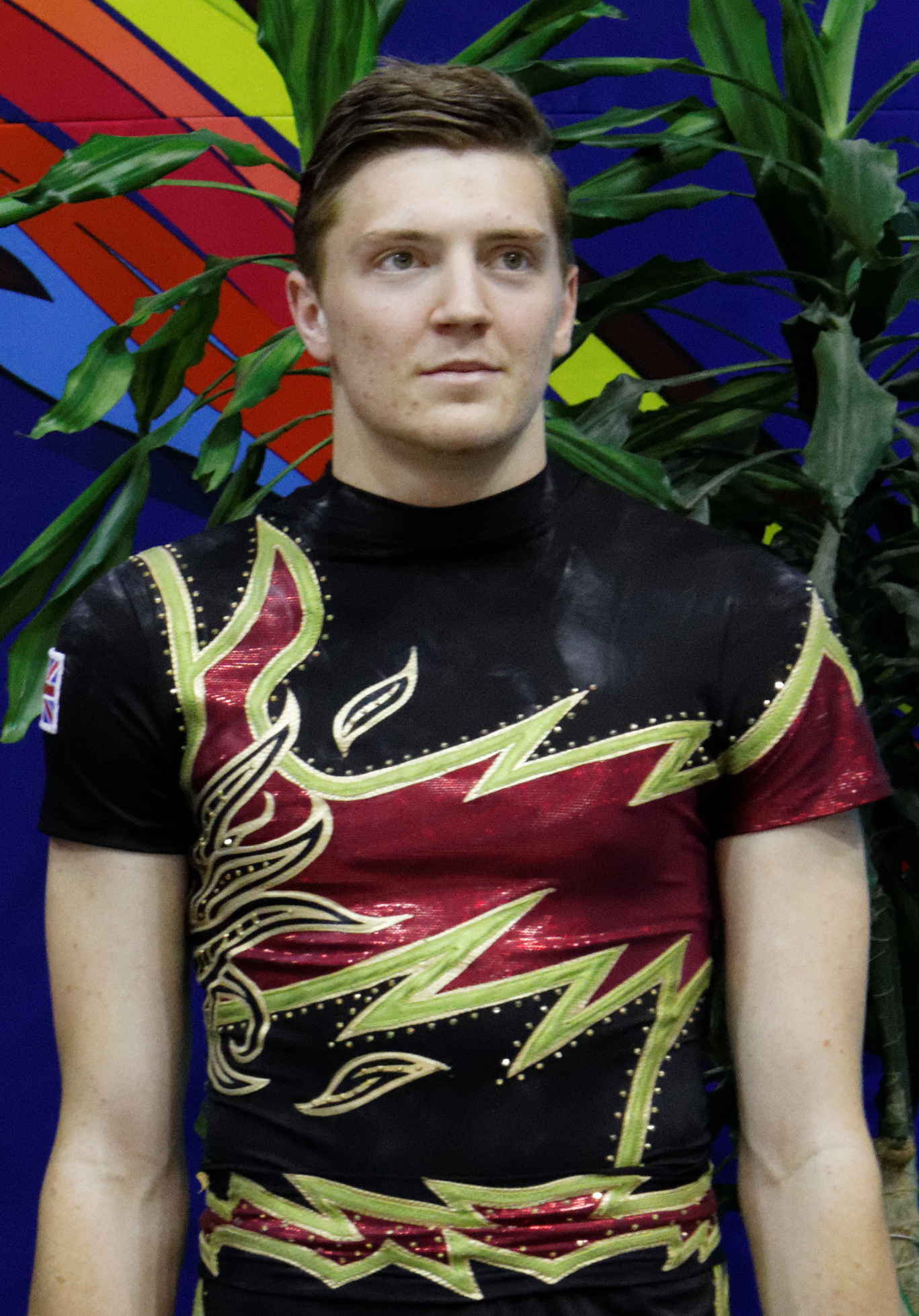
- Whittle at the 2014 Acrobatic Gymnastics World Championships

Personal information
- Born: 16 July 1994 (age 32)

Gymnastics career
- Discipline: Acrobatic gymnastics
- Country represented: Great Britain
- Club: Southampton Gymnastics Club
Medal record
World Championships
Bronze medal – third place	2014 Levallois-Perret	Men's Pair

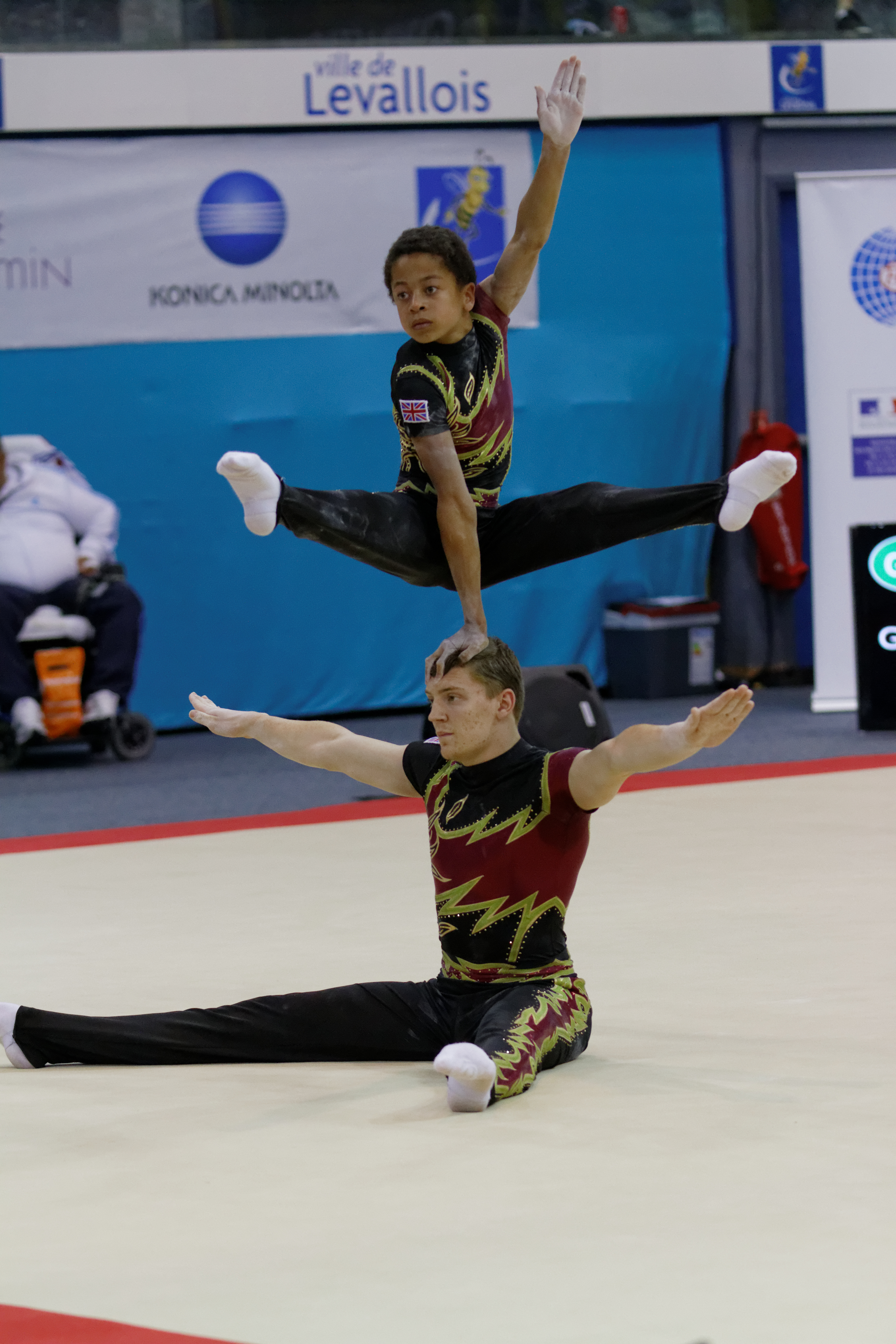
Kieran Whittle (bottom) and Farai Bright-Garamukanwa at the 2014 Acrobatic Gymnastics World Championships.

Kieran Whittle (born 16 July 1994) is a British male acrobatic gymnast. For their first major international competition, Farai Bright-Garamukanwa and Kieran Whittle achieved bronze in the 2014 Acrobatic Gymnastics World Championships.
