= Vladyslav Bobryshev =

Ukrainian acrobatic gymnast (born 1997)

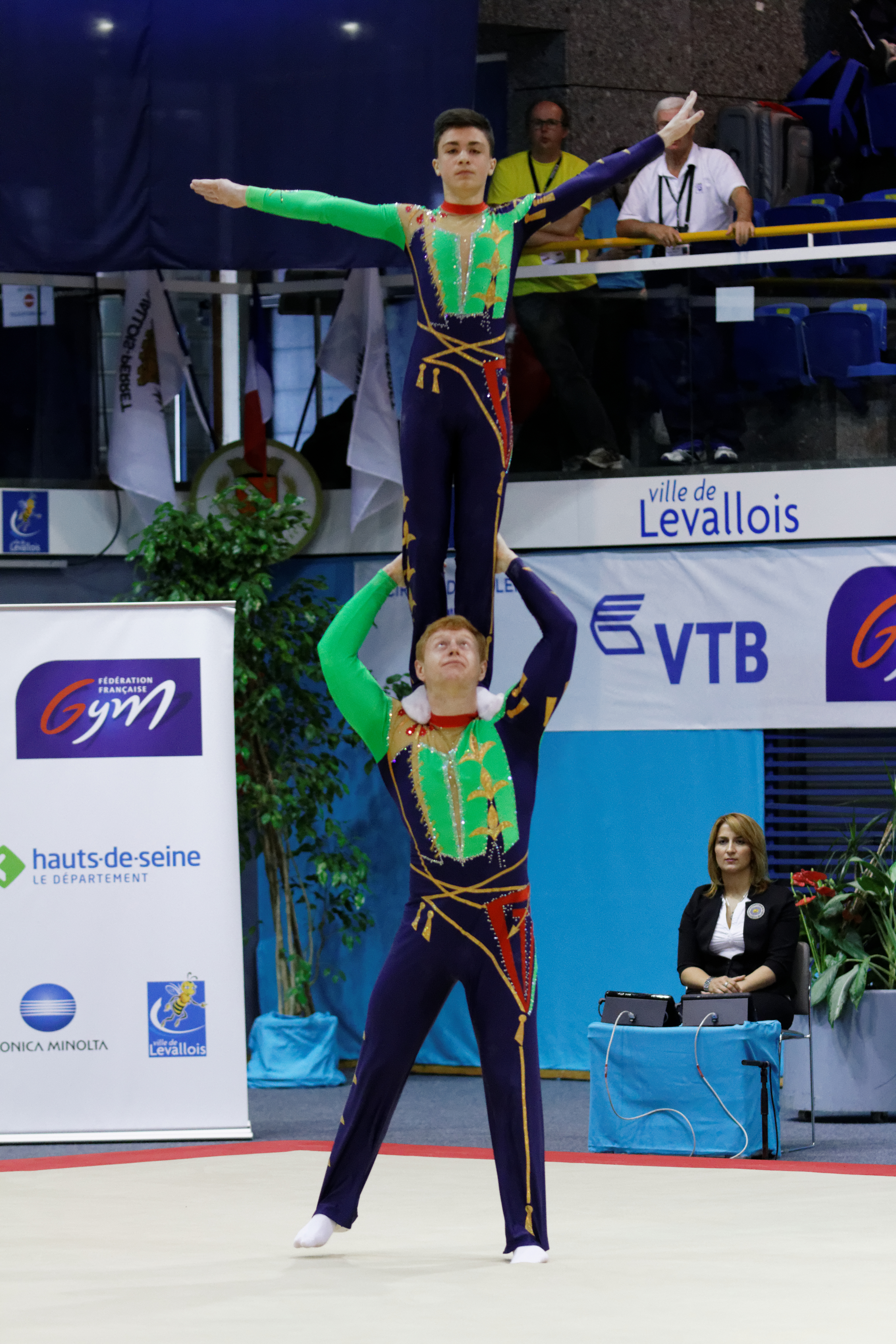
- Vladyslav Bobryshev (top) and Andrii Kobchyk at the 2014 Acrobatic Gymnastics World Championships

Personal information
- Born: September 10, 1997 (age 28)

Gymnastics career
- Discipline: Acrobatic gymnastics
- Country represented: Ukraine
- Club: International

Vladyslav Bobryshev (born September 10, 1997) is a Ukrainian male acrobatic gymnast. Along with his partner, Andrii Kobchyk, he finished 6th in the 2014 Acrobatic Gymnastics World Championships.
