= Andrii Kobchyk =

Ukrainian acrobatic gymnast

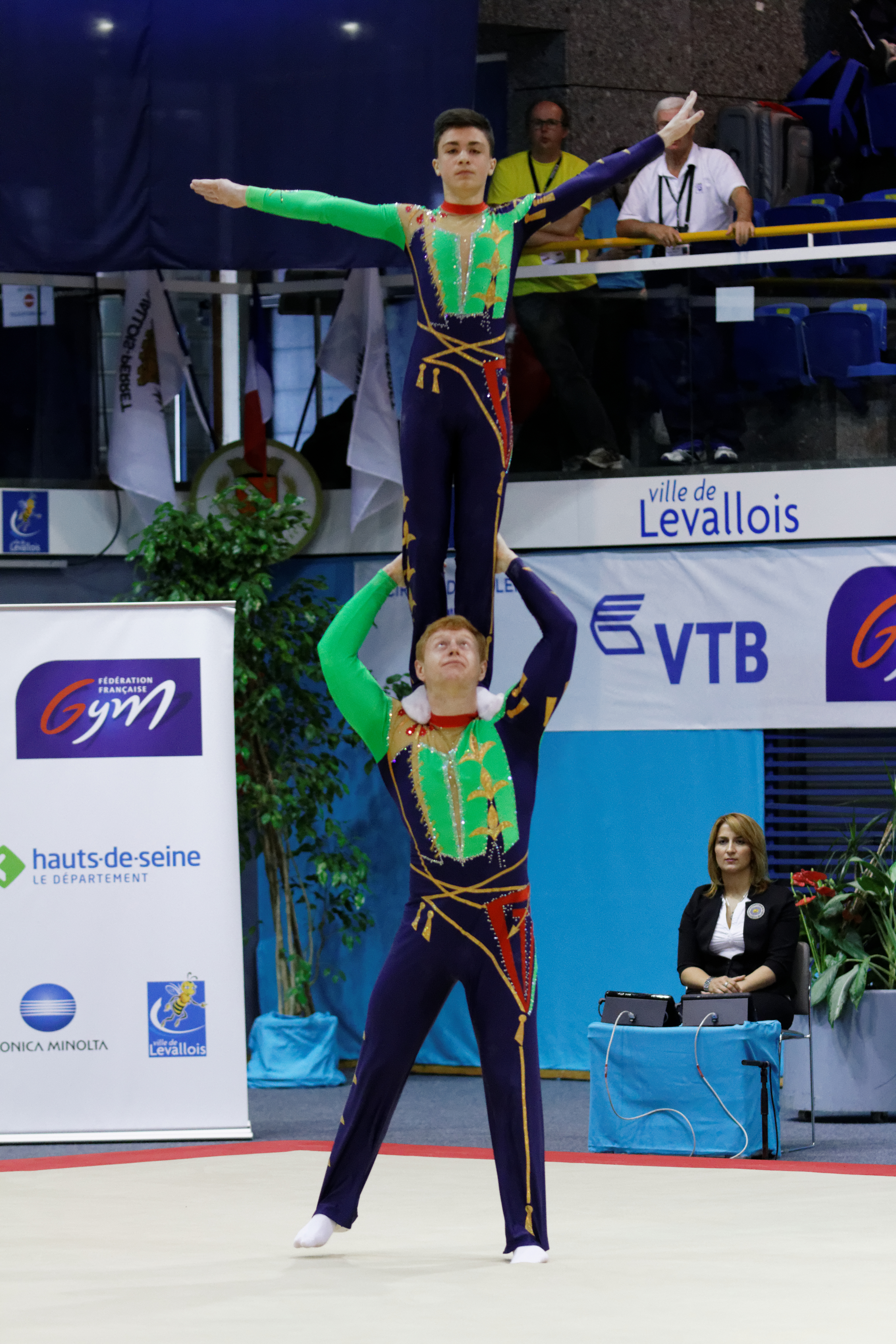
- Andrii Kobchyk (bottom) and Vladyslav Bobryshev at the 2014 Acrobatic Gymnastics World Championships

Personal information
- Born: March 9, 1994 (age 32)

Gymnastics career
- Discipline: Acrobatic gymnastics
- Country represented: Ukraine

Andrii Kobchyk (born March 9, 1994) is a Ukrainian male acrobatic gymnast. Along with his partner, Vladyslav Bobryshev, he finished 6th in the 2014 Acrobatic Gymnastics World Championships.
