= Li Ziyang =

Chinese acrobatic gymnast

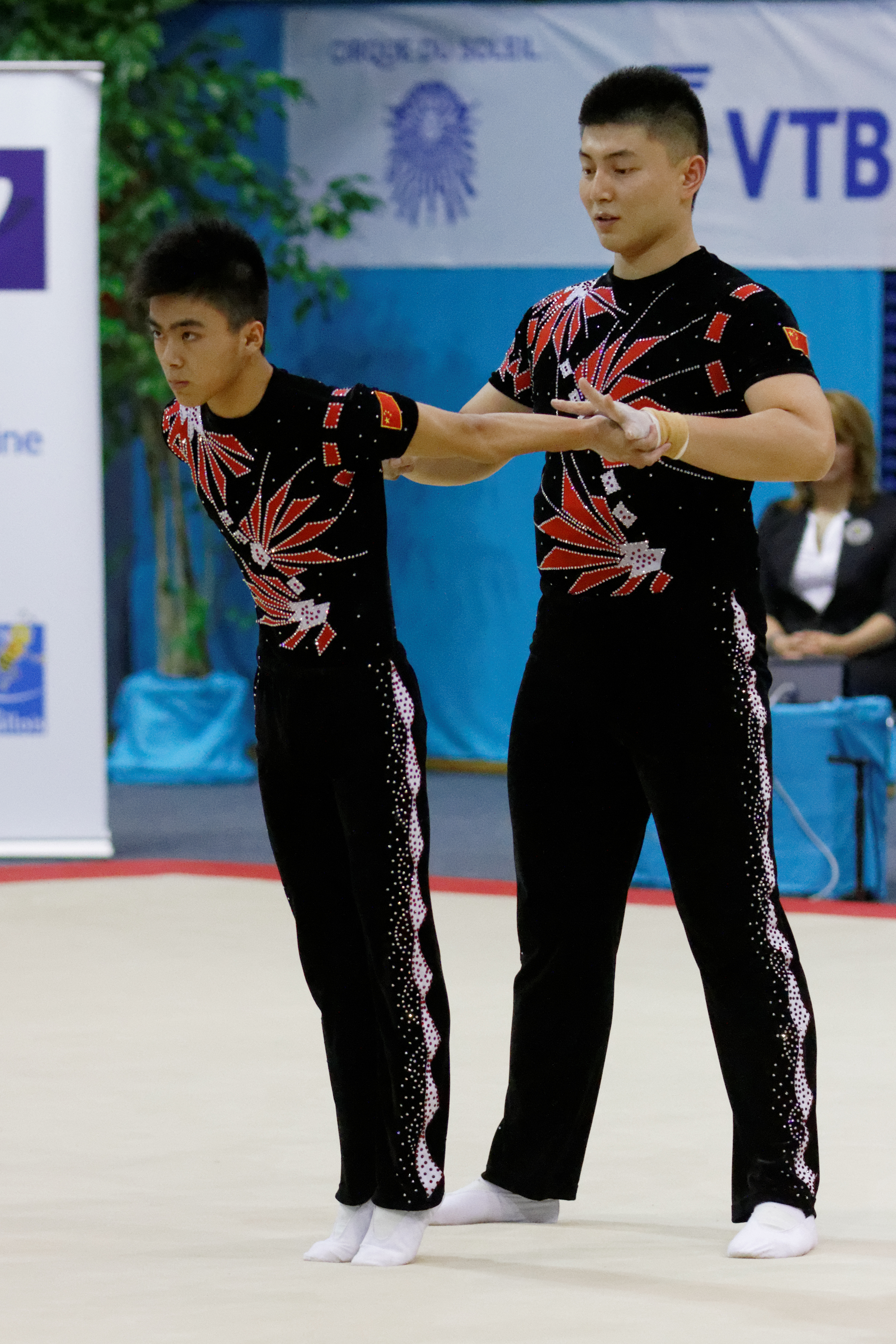
- Li Ziyang (left) and Zhang Shaolong at the 2014 Acrobatic Gymnastics World Championships

Personal information
- Born: September 23, 1996 (age 29)

Gymnastics career
- Discipline: Acrobatic gymnastics
- Country represented: China

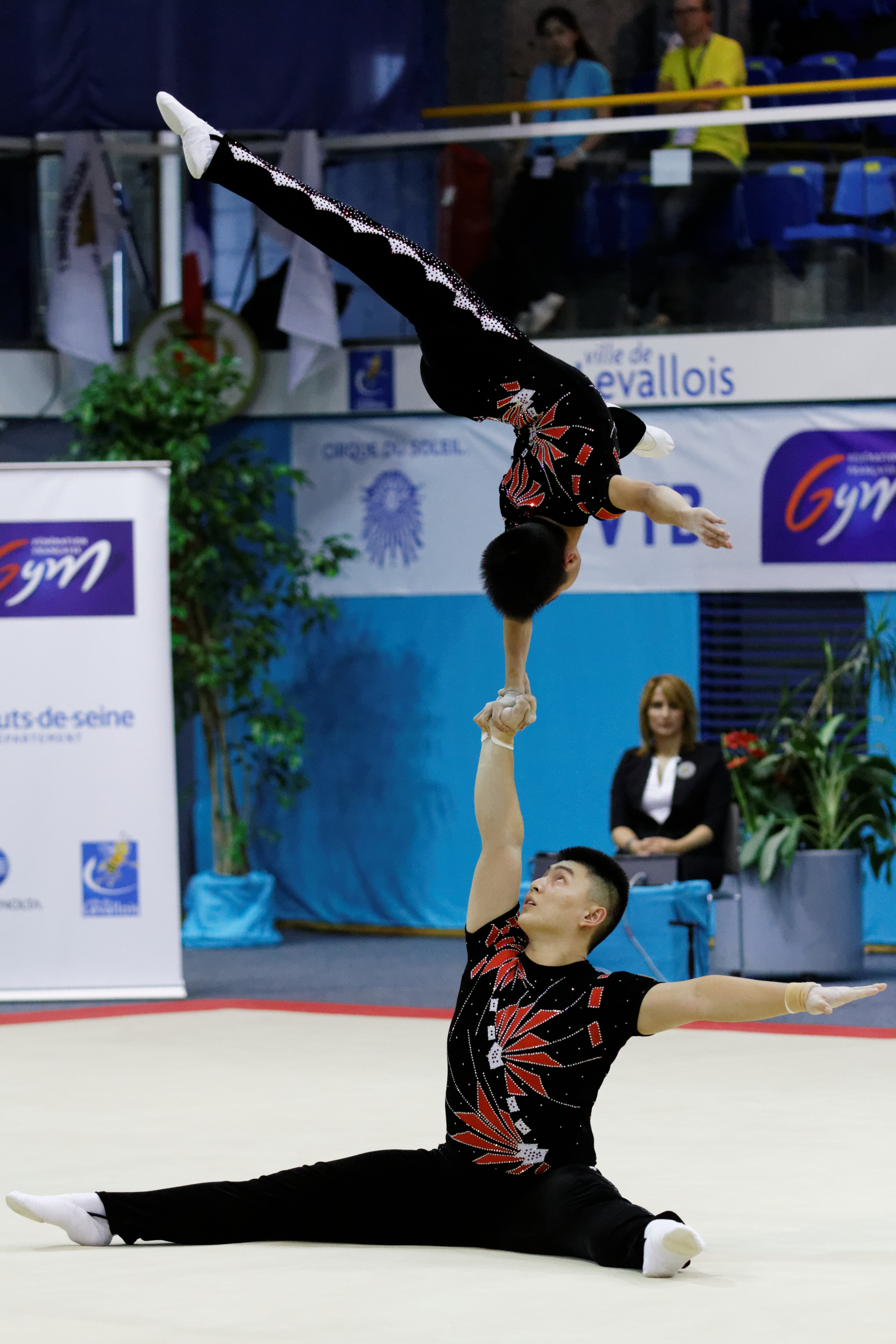
Li Ziyang (top) and Zhang Shaolong at the 2014 Acrobatic Gymnastics World Championships.

Li Ziyang (born September 23, 1996) is a Chinese male acrobatic gymnast. Along with his partner, Zhang Shaolong, he finished 5th in the 2014 Acrobatic Gymnastics World Championships.
