= Farai Bright-Garamukanwa =

British acrobatic gymnast

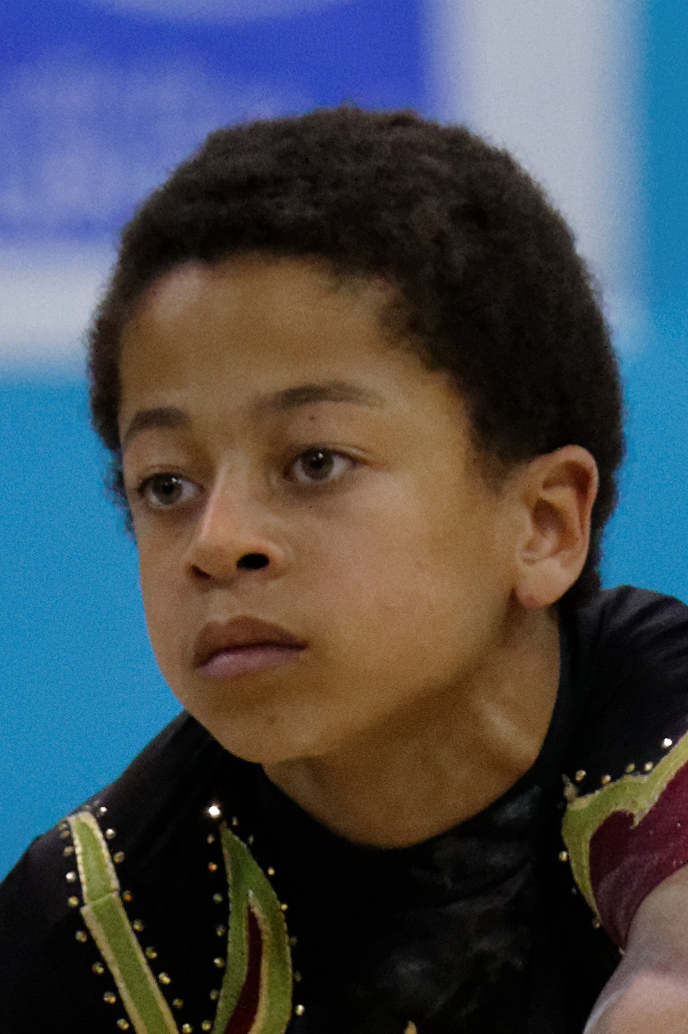
- Farai Bright-Garamukanwa at the 2014 Acrobatic Gymnastics World Championships

Personal information
- Born: 3 June 1999 (age 27)

Gymnastics career
- Discipline: Acrobatic gymnastics
- Country represented: Great Britain
- Club: Southampton Gymnastics Club
- Head coach: Keri Llewellyn
Medal record
World Championships
Bronze medal – third place	2014 Levallois-Perret	Men's Pair

Farai Bright-Garamukanwa (born 3 June 1999) is a British male acrobatic gymnast. For their first major international competition, Kieran Whittle and Farai Bright-Garamukanwa achieved bronze in the 2014 Acrobatic Gymnastics World Championships.
