= Valeria Belkina =

Russian acrobatic gymnast

Valeriia Belkina
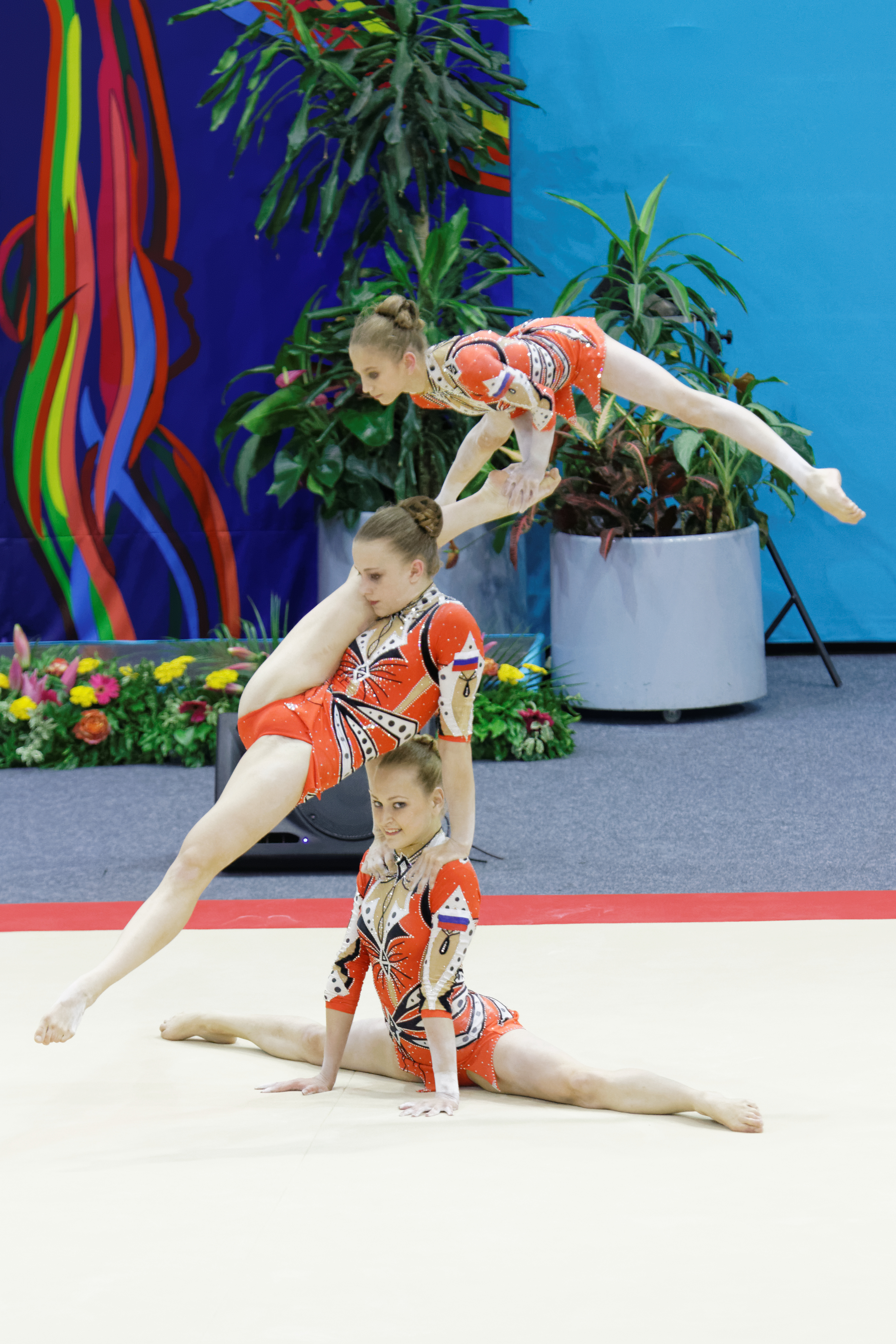

Personal information
- Born: 6 September 1999 (age 27)

Gymnastics career
- Discipline: Acrobatic gymnastics
- Country represented: Russia
Medal record
Women's acrobatic gymnastics
Representing Russia
World Championships
Silver medal – second place	2014 Levallois-Perret	Group
Gold medal – first place	2016 Putian	Group
European Games
Silver medal – second place	2015 Baku	Group All-Around
Silver medal – second place	2015 Baku	Group Balance
Silver medal – second place	2015 Baku	Group Dynamic

Valeria Igorevna Belkina (Russian: Валерия Игоревна Белкина; born 6 September 1999) is a Russian female acrobatic gymnast. With partners Victoria Ilicheva and Alena Kholod, Belkina achieved silver in the 2014 Acrobatic Gymnastics World Championships. With partners Zhanna Parkhometets and Yulia Nikitina, they achieved silver in the first European Games from Baku 2015 and achieved gold in the 2016 Acrobatic Gymnastics World Championships.
