= Victoria Ilicheva =

Russian acrobatic gymnast

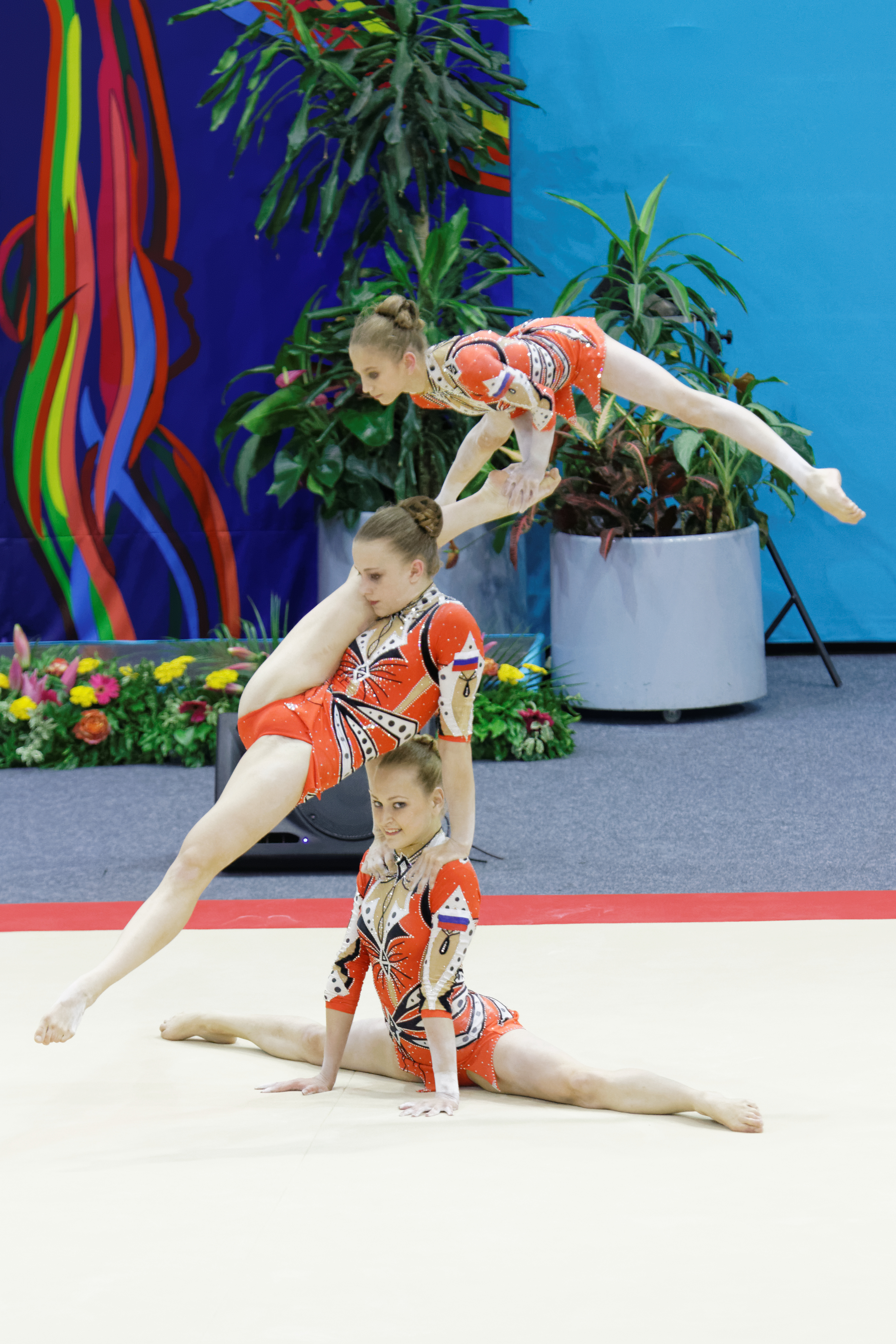

Personal information
- Born: 5 June 1993 (age 33)

Gymnastics career
- Discipline: Acrobatic gymnastics
- Country represented: Russia

Victoria Ilicheva (born 5 June 1993) is a Russian female acrobatic gymnast. With partners Valeriia Belkina and Alena Kholod, Ilicheva achieved silver in the 2014 Acrobatic Gymnastics World Championships.
