= Bohdanov =

Bohdanov (feminine: Bohdanova) is a Ukrainian-language surname literally meaning "Bohdan's (descendant)". The Russian-language equivalent is Bogdanov and the Belarusian equivalent is Bahdanau. Notable people with the surname include:

- Andriy Bohdanov (born 1990), Ukrainian footballer
- Bohdán Bohdánov (born 1996), Ukrainian photographer
- Vitaliy Bohdanov (born 1990), Ukrainian footballer
- Ella Bohdanova (born 1996), Ukrainian acrobatic gymnast
