= Ri Hyang =

North Korean gymnast

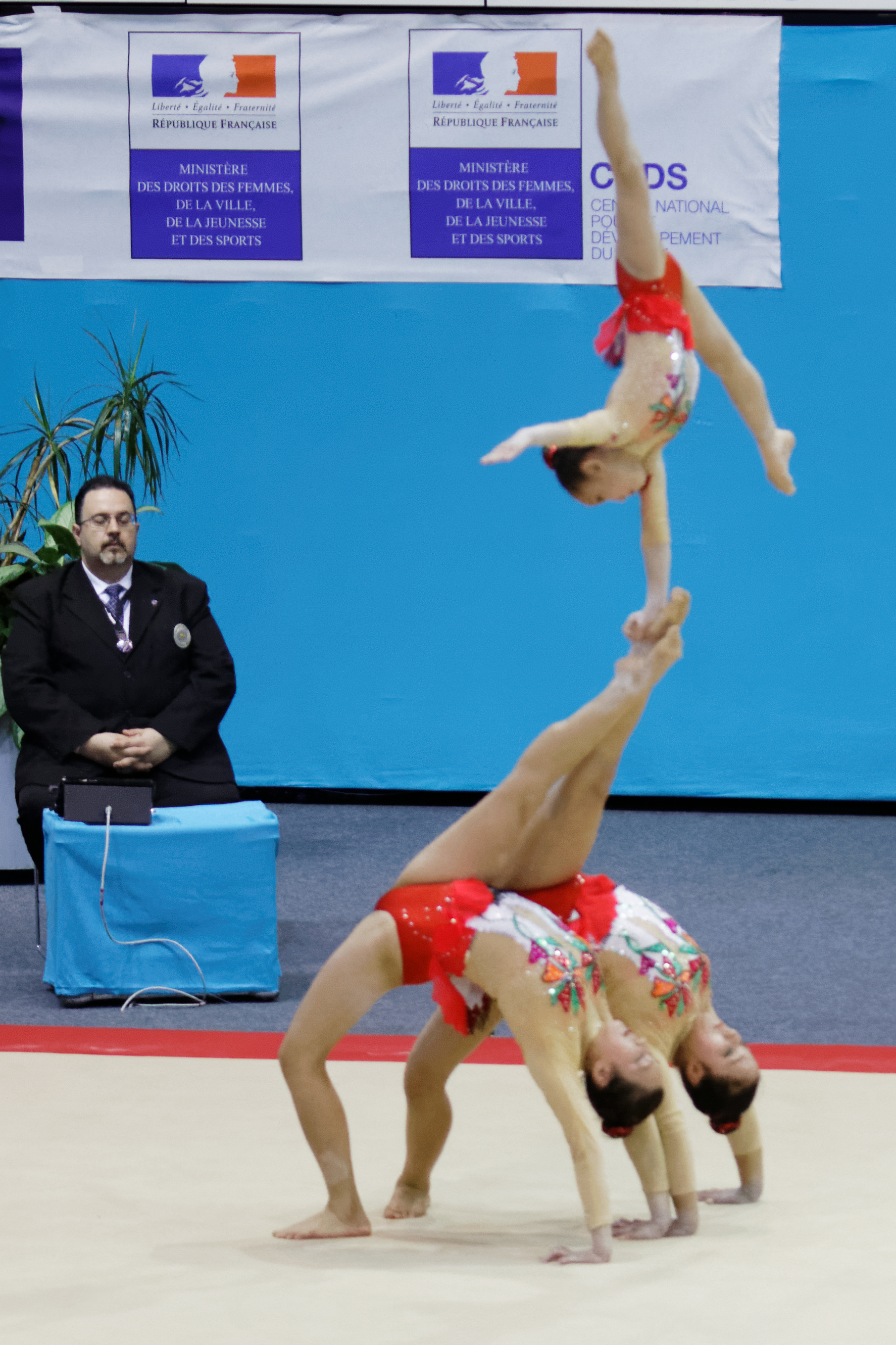

Personal information
- Born: August 10, 1996 (age 30)

Gymnastics career
- Discipline: Acrobatic gymnastics
- Country represented: North Korea

Ri Hyang (born August 10, 1996) is a North Korean female acrobatic gymnast. With partners Ri Jin Hwa and Kim Un Sol, Ri achieved 4th in the 2014 Acrobatic Gymnastics World Championships.
