= Shen Yunyun =

Chinese acrobatic gymnast

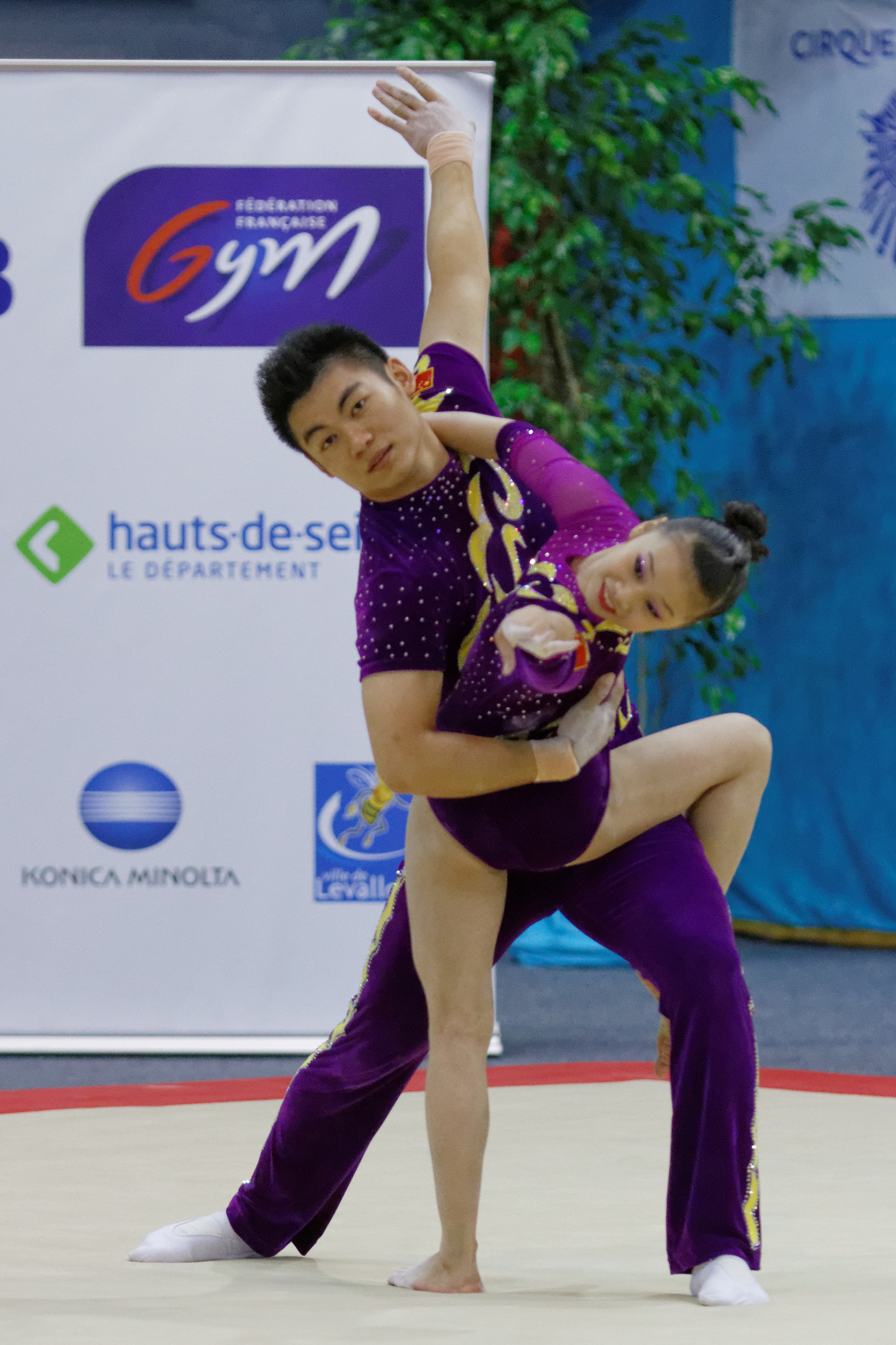
- Shen Yunyun and his partner Wu Wenhui

Personal information
- Born: August 24, 1991 (age 35)

Gymnastics career
- Discipline: Acrobatic gymnastics
- Country represented: China

Shen Yunyun (born August 24, 1991) is a Chinese male acrobatic gymnast. Along with his partner, Wu Wenhui, he finished 5th in the 2014 Acrobatic Gymnastics World Championships.
