= Léa Roussel =

French acrobatic gymnast

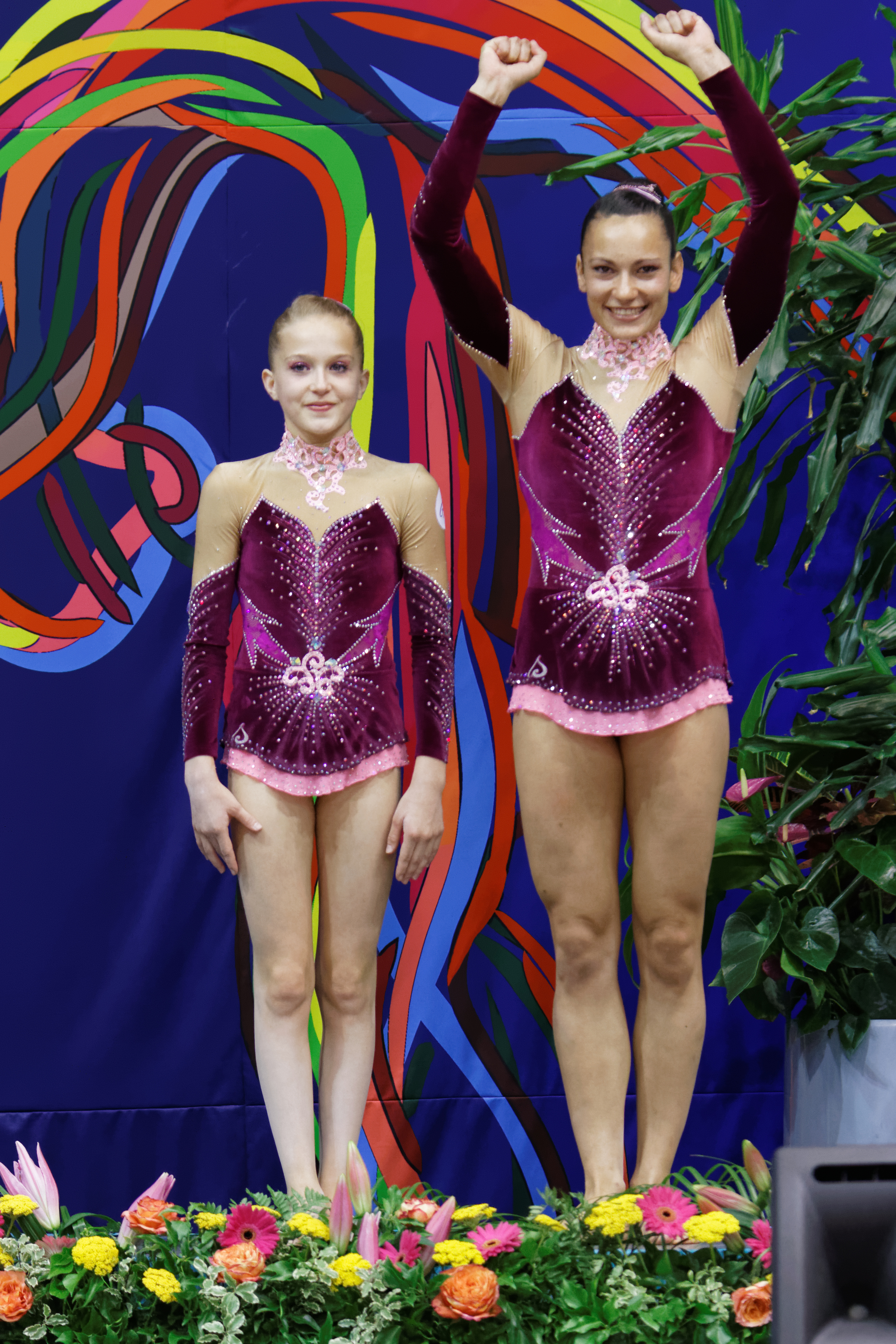
- Claire Philouze and Léa Roussel (right) at the 2014 Acrobatic Gymnastics World Championships

Personal information
- Born: 5 July 1992 (age 34) Sète

Gymnastics career
- Discipline: Acrobatic gymnastics
- Country represented: France
- Club: US Talence Acrosport
- Head coaches: Nicolas Philouze, Magali Philouze
- Former coaches: Karine Soler, Delphine Delhorme, David Combalbert
Medal record
World Championships
Bronze medal – third place	2014 Levallois-Perret	Women's Pair

Léa Roussel (born 5 July 1992) is a French female acrobatic gymnast.

Roussel is a part of the Léa Roussel-Claire Philouze duo, who have achieved bronze in the 2014 Acrobatic Gymnastics World Championships. They have also reached the final of the seventh series of France's got talent in December 2012, finishing in fourth place.
