= Elizaveta Dubrovina and Valentina Kim =

Russian gymnast

Elizaveta Dubrovina
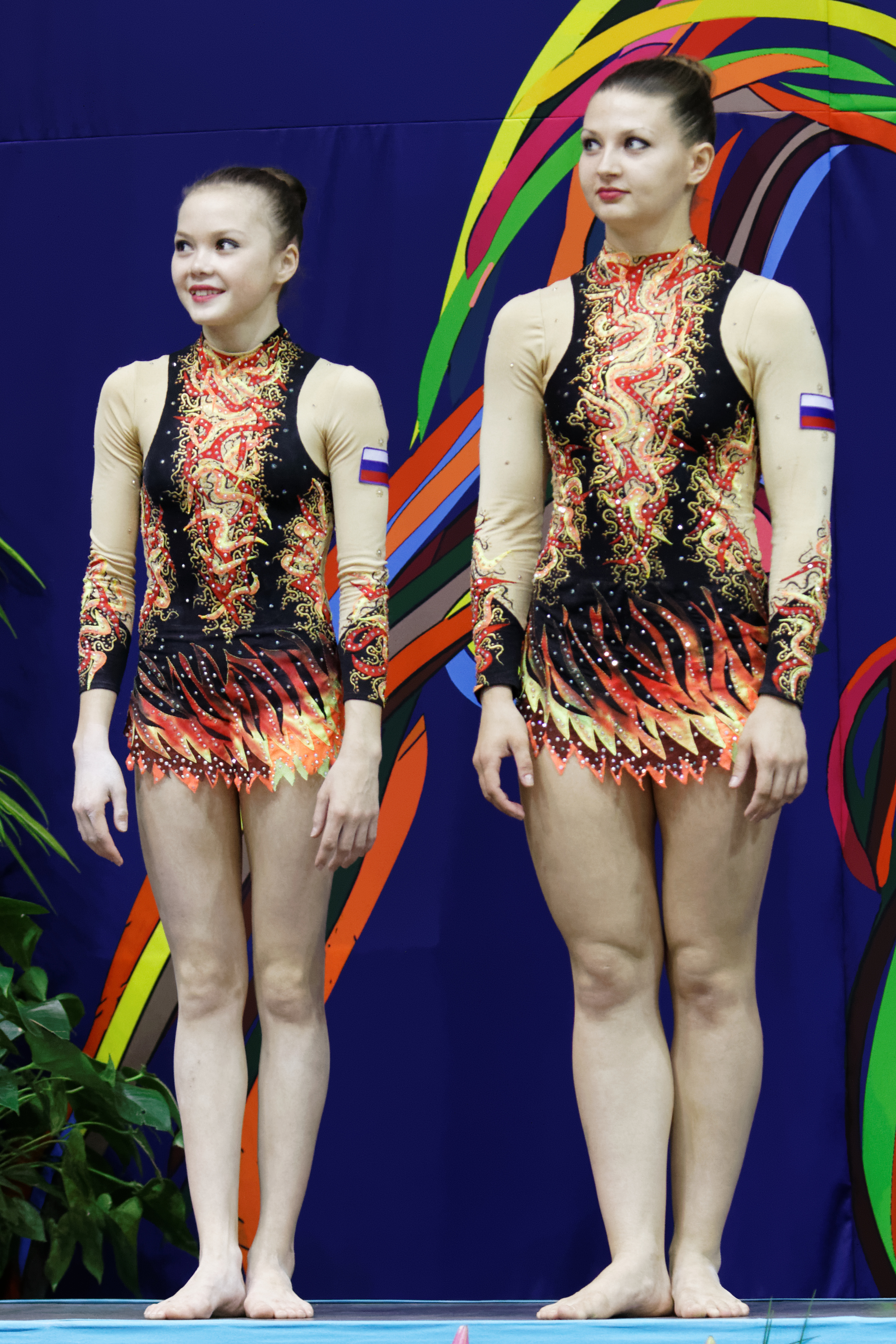
- Valentina Kim and Elizaveta Dubrovina (right)

Personal information
- Born: 20 October 1993 (age 32)

Gymnastics career
- Discipline: Acrobatic gymnastics
- Country represented: Russia
Medal record
World Championships
Silver medal – second place	2014 Levallois-Perret	Women's Pair

Elizaveta Dubrovina (born 20 October 1993) and Valentina Kim (born 20 July 1995) are Russian female acrobatic gymnasts. They won a silver medal in the 2014 Acrobatic Gymnastics World Championships.
