= Eline De Smedt =

Belgian acrobatic gymnast

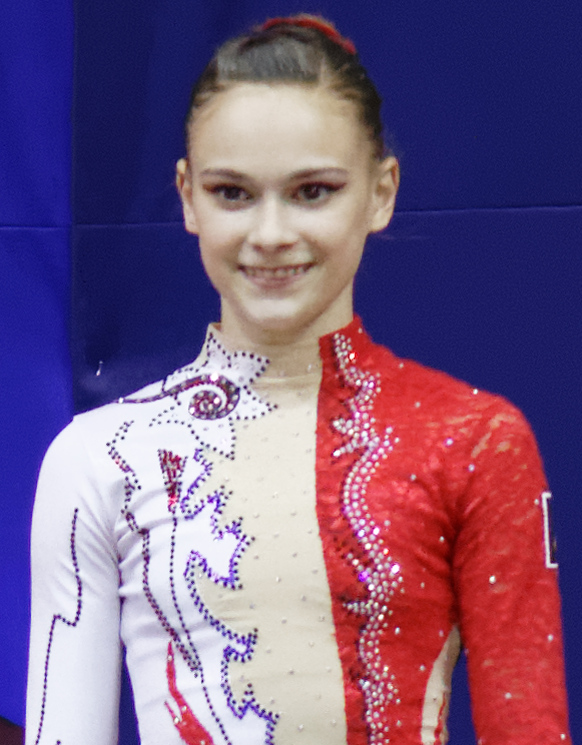
- Eline De Smedt at the 2014 Acrobatic Gymnastics World Championships

Personal information
- Born: 10 February 1998 (age 28)

Gymnastics career
- Discipline: Acrobatic gymnastics
- Country represented: Belgium
- Club: Gymfinity, Topsportcentrum Gent
- Head coaches: Sergey Tretjakov, Slavik Kosakovsky
- Choreographer: Irina Shadrina
Medal record
World Championships
Gold medal – first place	2014 Levallois-Perret	Women's Pair

Eline De Smedt (born 10 February 1998) is a Belgian female acrobatic gymnast. With partner Nikki Snel, Eline De Smedt achieved gold in the 2014 Acrobatic Gymnastics World Championships.
