= Viktoriya Mikhnovich =

Belarusian acrobatic gymnast

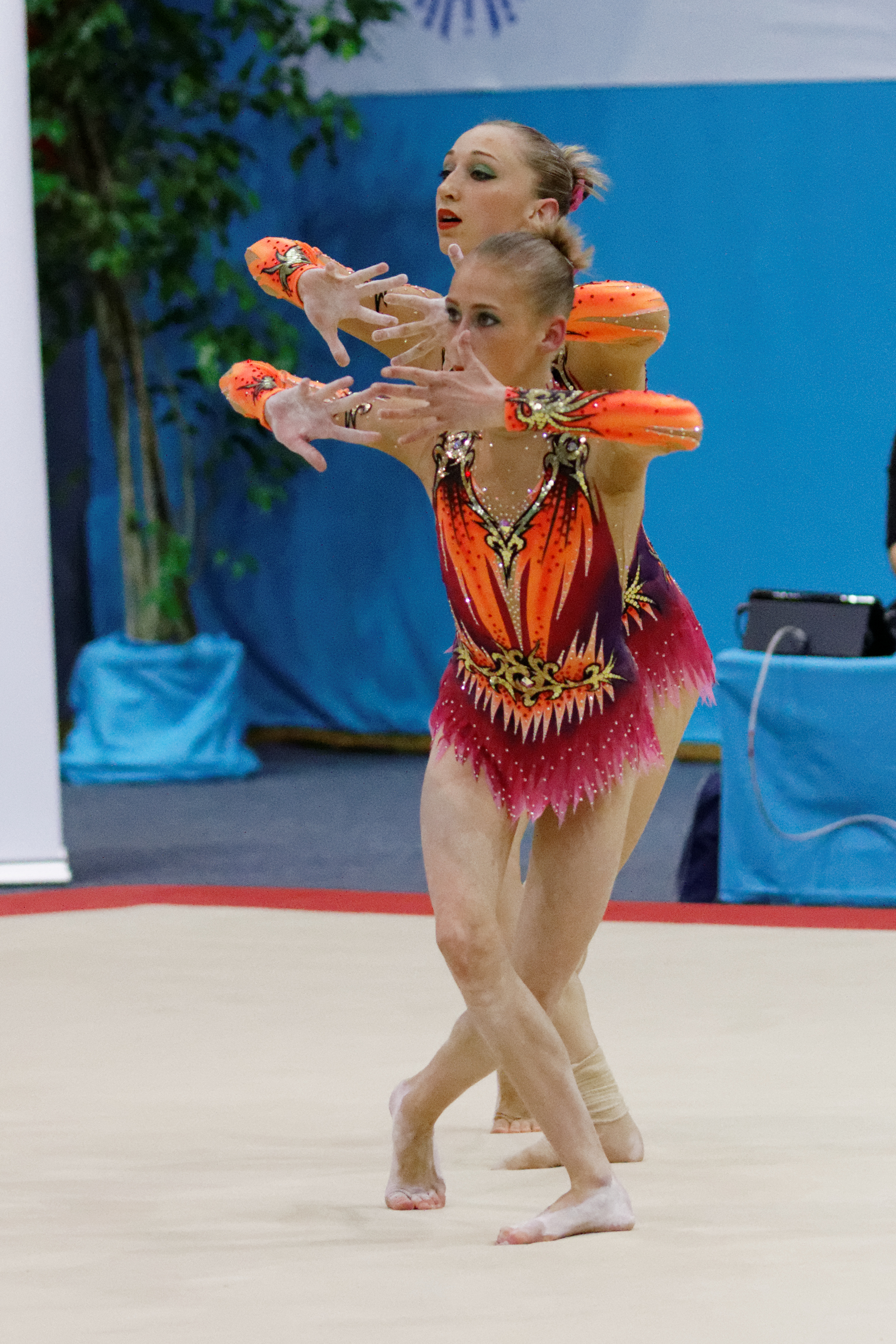
- Viktoriya Mikhnovich and Marharyta Bartashevich

Personal information
- Born: 5 March 1997 (age 29)

Gymnastics career
- Discipline: Acrobatic gymnastics
- Country represented: Belarus

Viktoriya Mikhnovich (Belarusian: Вікторыя Міхновіч, born 5 March 1997) is a Belarusian female acrobatic gymnast. With partner Marharyta Bartashevich, Mikhnovich achieved 4th in the 2014 Acrobatic Gymnastics World Championships. The pair were initially awarded bronze, but after the competition was complete the judges revised the score to reflect the fact that they had not finished in time with their music.
