= Claire Philouze =

French acrobatic gymnast

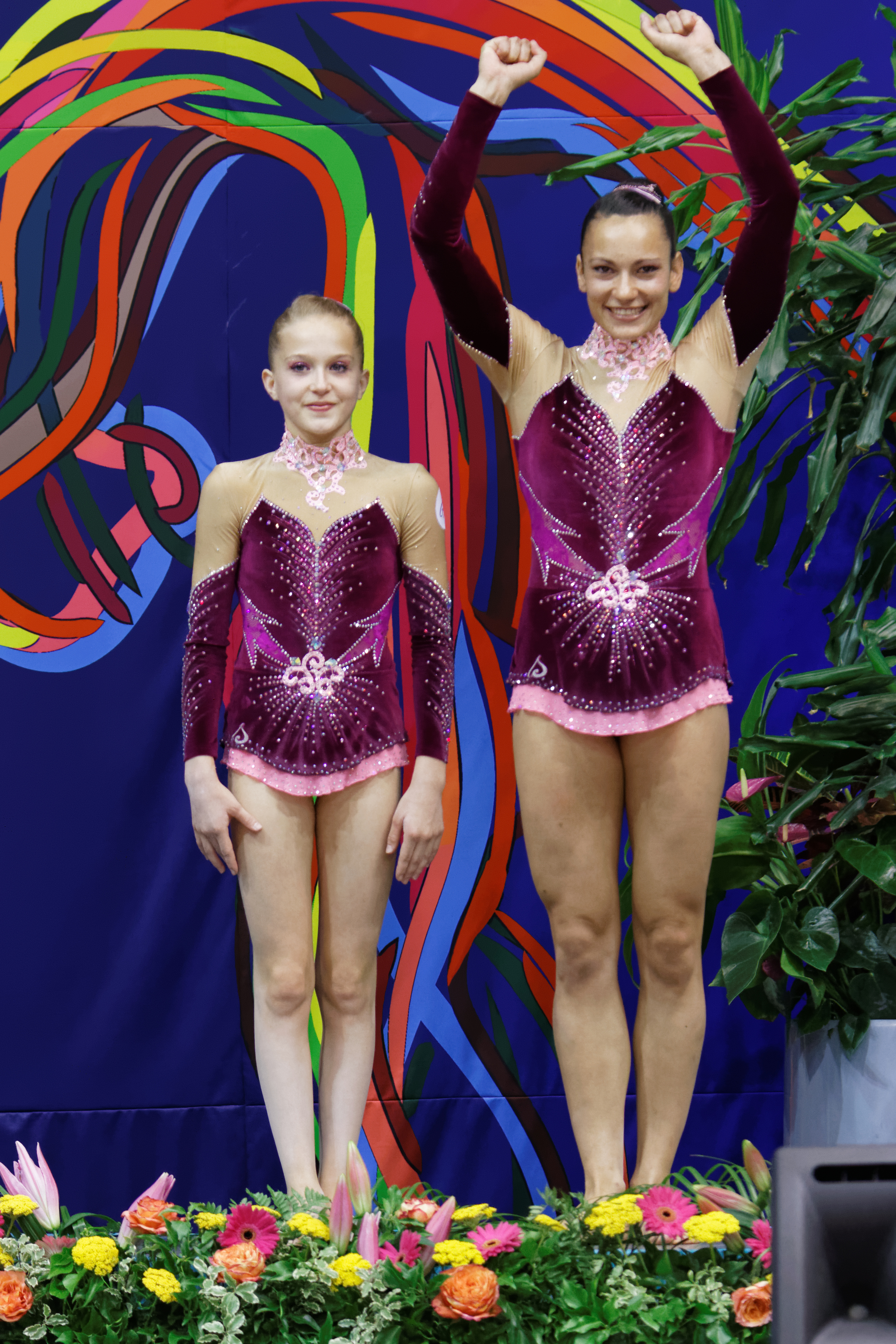
- Claire Philouze (left) and Léa Roussel at the 2014 Acrobatic Gymnastics World Championships

Personal information
- Born: 15 July 1998 (age 28)

Gymnastics career
- Discipline: Acrobatic gymnastics
- Country represented: France
- Club: US Talence Acrosport
- Head coaches: Nicolas Philouze, Magali Philouze
Medal record
World Championships
Bronze medal – third place	2014 Levallois-Perret	Women's Pair

Claire Philouze (born 15 July 1998) is a French female acrobatic gymnast.

Philouze is a part of the Léa Roussel-Claire Philouze duo, who have achieved bronze in the 2014 Acrobatic Gymnastics World Championships. They have also reached the final of the seventh series of France's got talent in December 2012, finishing in fourth place.
