= Nikki Snel =

Belgian acrobatic gymnast

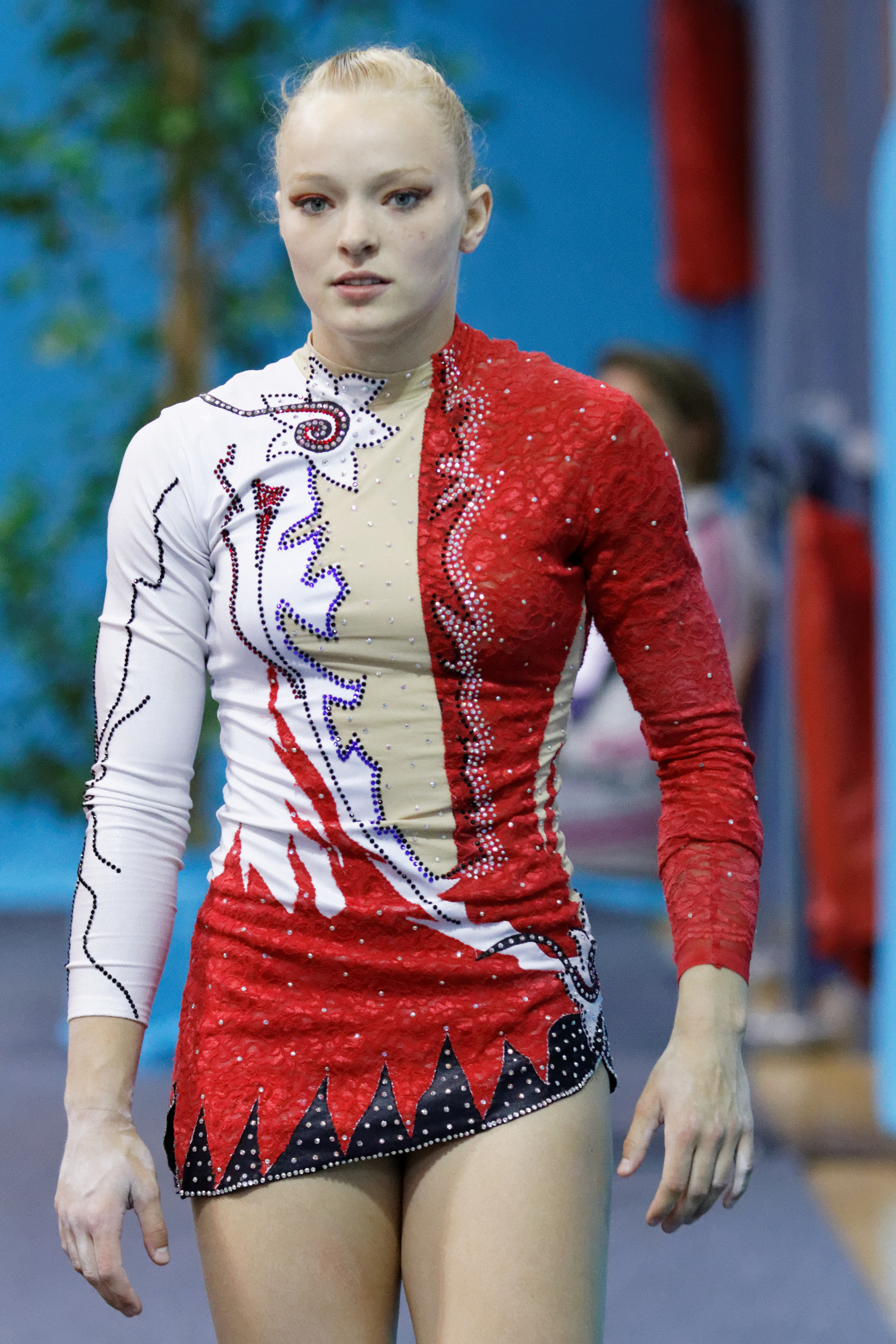
- Nikki Snel at the 2014 Acrobatic Gymnastics World Championships

Personal information
- Born: 13 August 1993 (age 33)

Gymnastics career
- Discipline: Acrobatic gymnastics
- Country represented: Belgium
- Club: Sportac Deinze, Topsportcentrum Gent
- Head coaches: Sergey Tretjakov, Slavik Kosakovsky
- Choreographer: Irina Shadrina
Medal record
World Championships
Gold medal – first place	2014 Levallois-Perret	Women's Pair

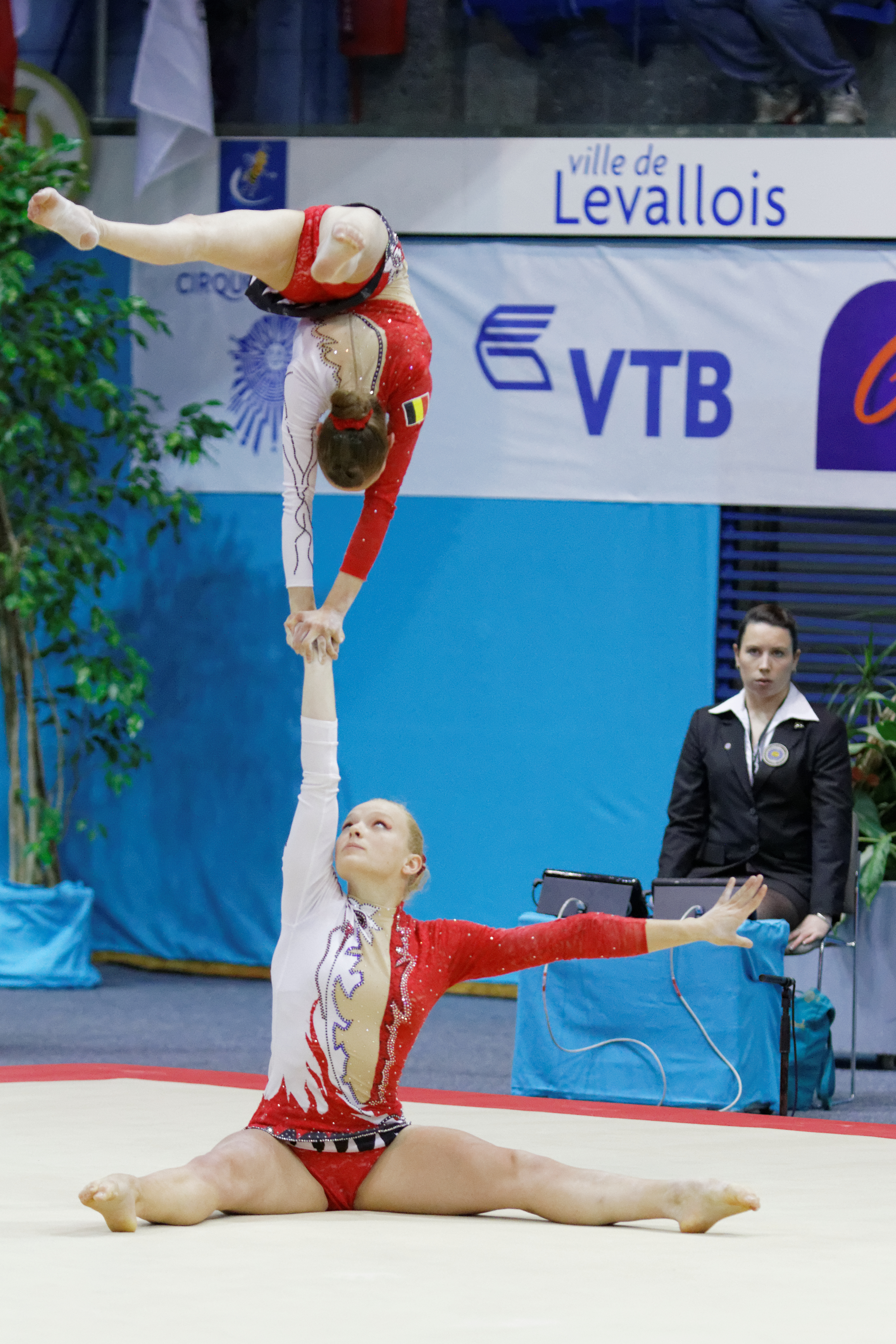
Nikki Snel (bottom) and Eline de Smedt at the 2014 Acrobatic Gymnastics World Championships.

Nikki Snel (born 13 August 1993) is a Belgian female acrobatic gymnast. With partner Eline de Smedt, Snel achieved gold in the 2014 Acrobatic Gymnastics World Championships.
