= Marharyta Bartashevich =

Belarusian acrobatic gymnast (born 1990)

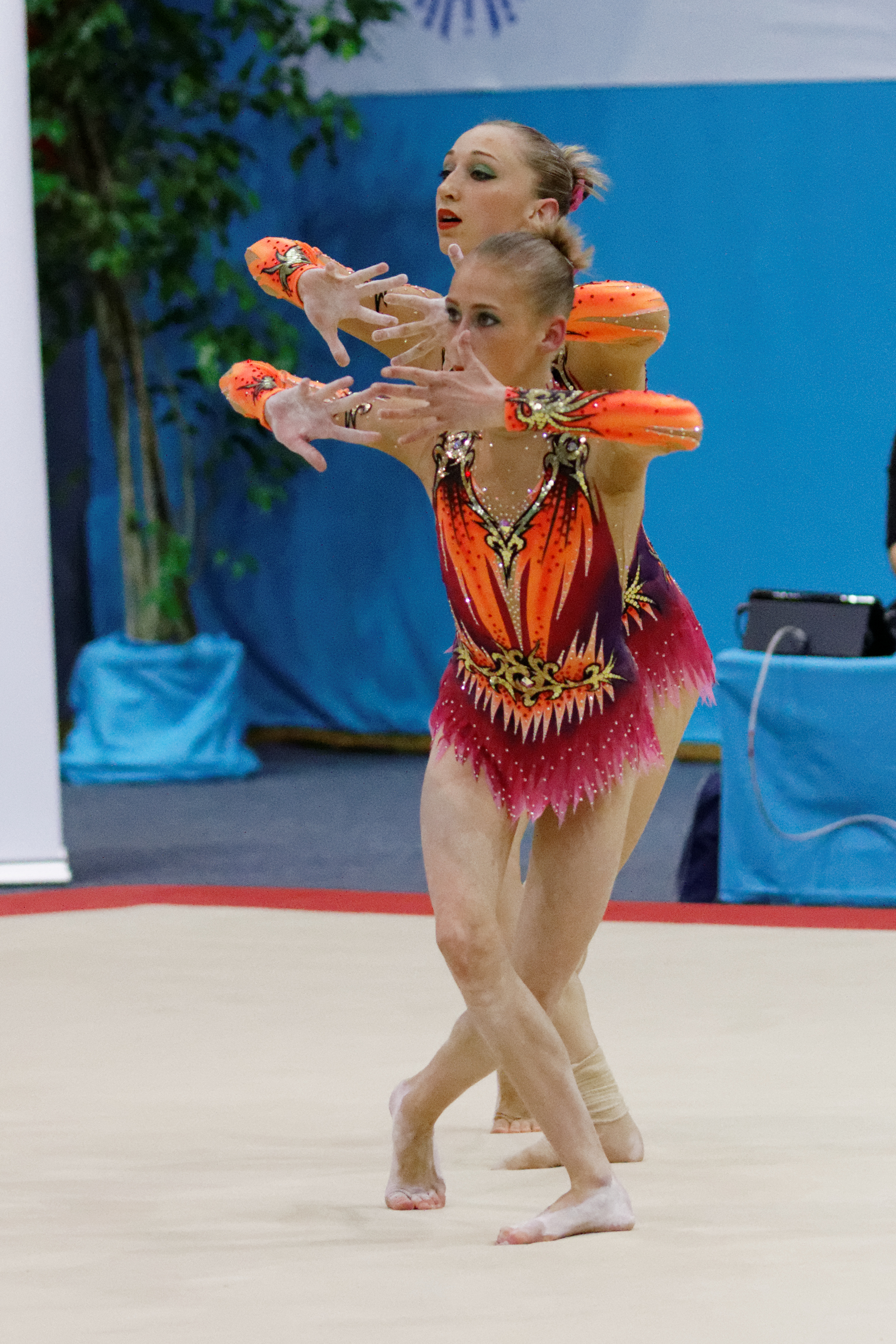
- Viktoriya Mikhnovich and Marharyta Bartashevich

Personal information
- Born: 6 July 1990 (age 36)

Gymnastics career
- Discipline: Acrobatic gymnastics
- Country represented: Belarus

Marharyta Bartashevich (Belarusian: Маргарыта Барташэвіч, born 6 July 1990) is a Belarusian female acrobatic gymnast. With partner Viktoriya Mikhnovich, Bartashevich achieved 4th in the 2014 Acrobatic Gymnastics World Championships.
