= Alena Kholod =

Russian acrobatic gymnast

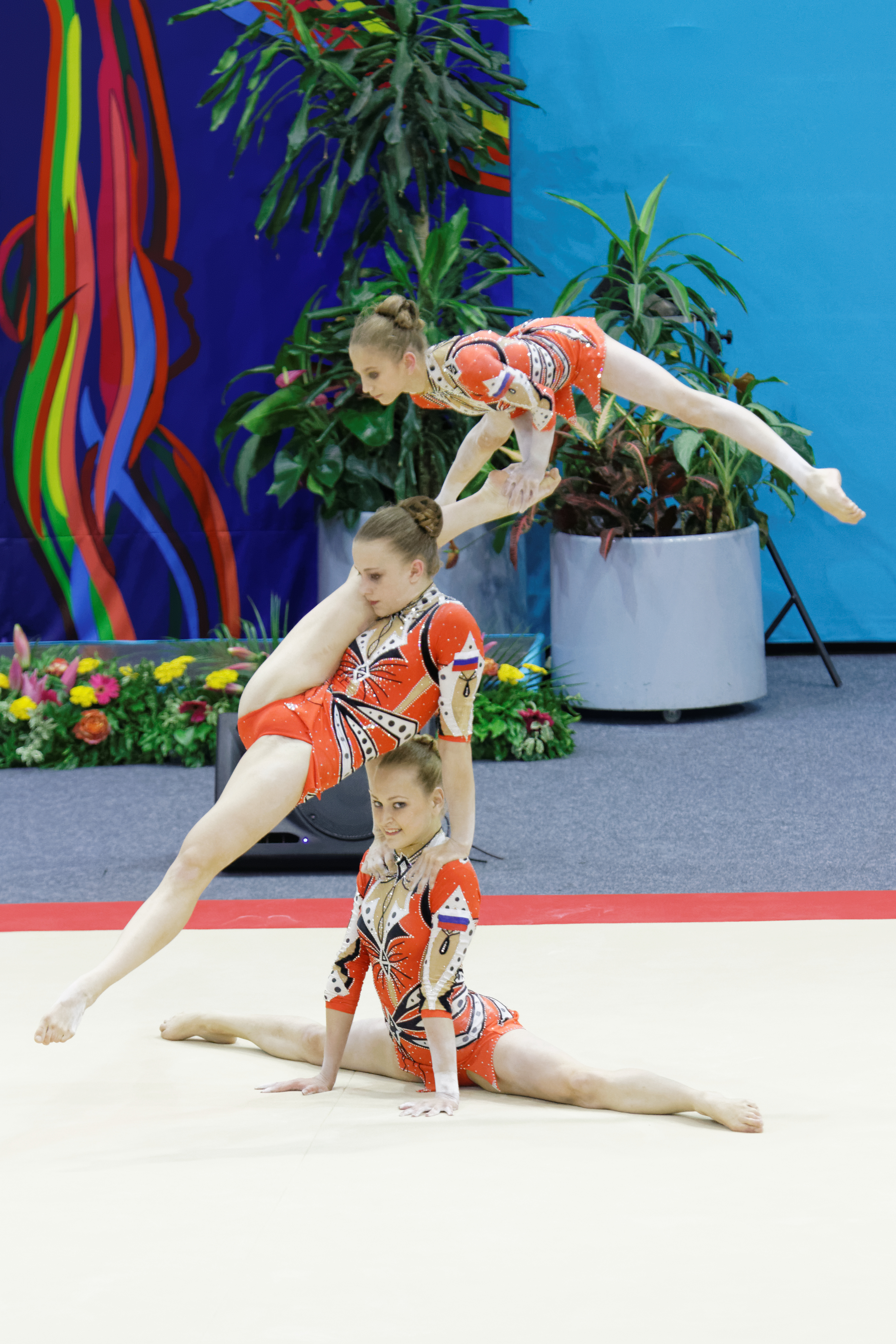

Personal information
- Born: 26 November 1995 (age 30)

Gymnastics career
- Discipline: Acrobatic gymnastics
- Country represented: Russia

Alena Kholod (born 26 November 1995) is a Russian female acrobatic gymnast. With partners Valeriia Belkina and Victoria Ilicheva, Kholod achieved silver in the 2014 Acrobatic Gymnastics World Championships.
