= 2014 Acrobatic Gymnastics World Championships =

International gymnastics competition

24th Acrobatic Gymnastics World Championships
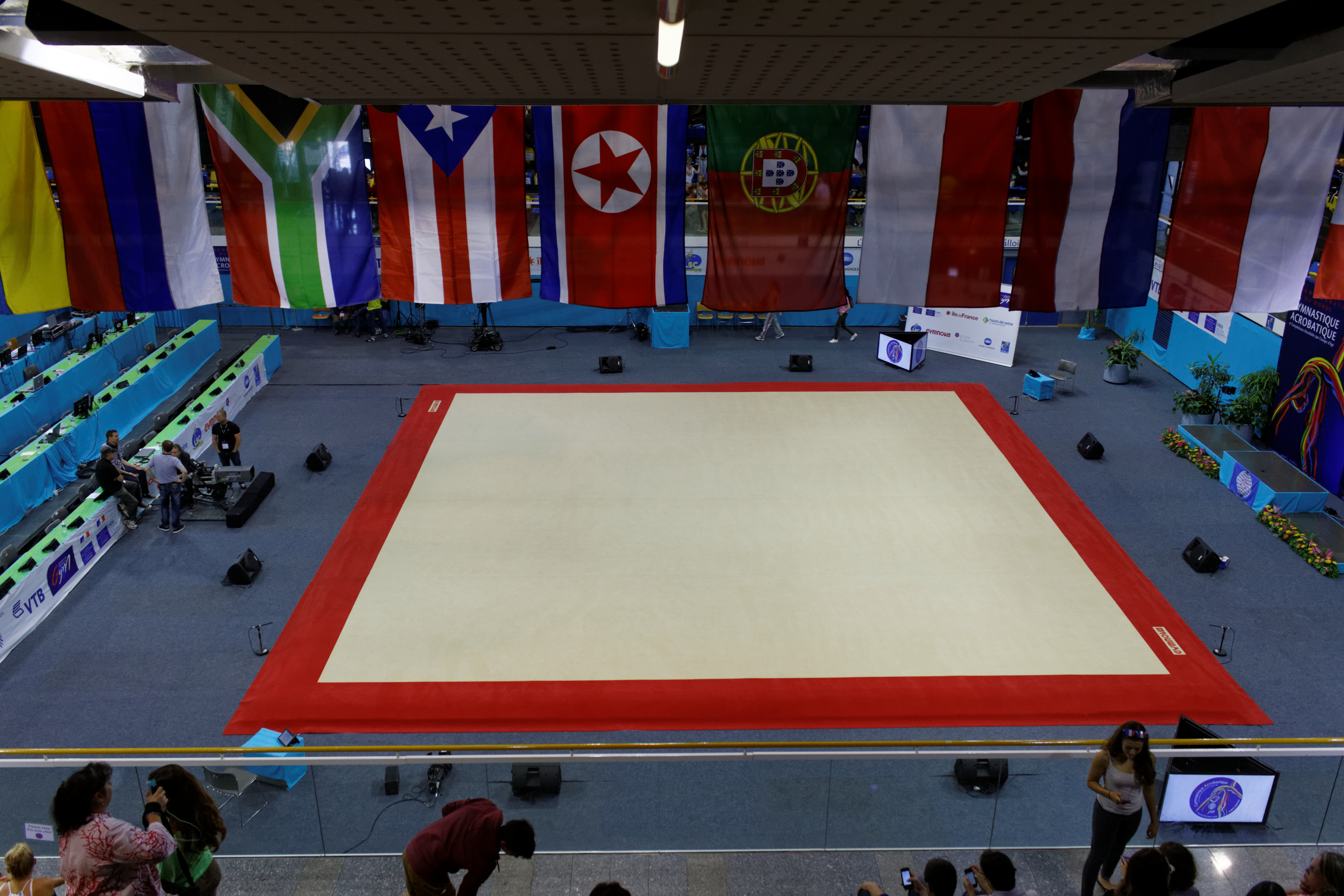
- Venue: Palais des Sports Marcel-Cerdan
- Location: Levallois-Perret, France
- Start date: 10 July 2014
- End date: 12 July 2014
- Competitors: 184 from 21 nations

The 24th World Acrobatic Gymnastics Championships were held in Levallois-Perret, France at the Palais des Sports Marcel-Cerdan from 10 July to 12 July 2014. 21 countries took part in the competition.

== Medal table ==
* Host nation (France)

| Rank | Nation | Gold | Silver | Bronze | Total |
|---|---|---|---|---|---|
| 1 | Russia | 2 | 2 | 1 | 5 |
| 2 | Great Britain | 1 | 2 | 1 | 4 |
| 3 | Belgium | 1 | 0 | 1 | 2 |
| 4 | China | 1 | 0 | 0 | 1 |
| 5 | Belarus | 0 | 1 | 0 | 1 |
| 6 | France | 0 | 0 | 1 | 1 |
| 6 | United States | 0 | 0 | 1 | 1 |
| Totals (7 entries) | | 5 | 5 | 5 | 15 |

== Medalists ==
| Event | Gold | Silver | Bronze |
|---|---|---|---|
Pairs
| Women | Belgium (BEL); Nikki Snel; Eline de Smedt | Russia (RUS); Valentina Kim; Elizaveta Dubrovina | France (FRA); Claire Philouze; Léa Roussel |
| Men | Russia (RUS); Konstantin Pilipchuk; Aleksei Dudchenko | Belarus (BLR); Ilya Rybinski; Yauheni Novikau | Great Britain (GBR); Kieran Whittle; Farai Bright-Garamukanwa |
| Mixed | Russia (RUS); Revaz Gurgenidze; Marina Chernova | Great Britain (GBR); Dominic Smith; Alice Upcott | United States (USA); Ryan Ward; Kiley Boynton |
Group
| Women | Great Britain (GBR); Elise Matthews; Georgia Lancaster; Millie Spalding | Russia (RUS); Valeriia Belkina; Victoria Ilicheva; Alena Kholod | Belgium (BEL); Julie van Gelder; Ineke van Schoor; Kaat Dumarey |
| Men | China (CHN); Zhou Yi; Wang Lei; Tang Jian; Wu Yeqiuyin | Great Britain (GBR); Connor Bartlett; Gareth Wood; Daniel Cook; George Wood | Russia (RUS); Valentin Chetverkin; Maksim Chulkov; Aleksandr Kurasov; Dmitry Bryzgalov |

== Results ==
=== Women's Pairs ===
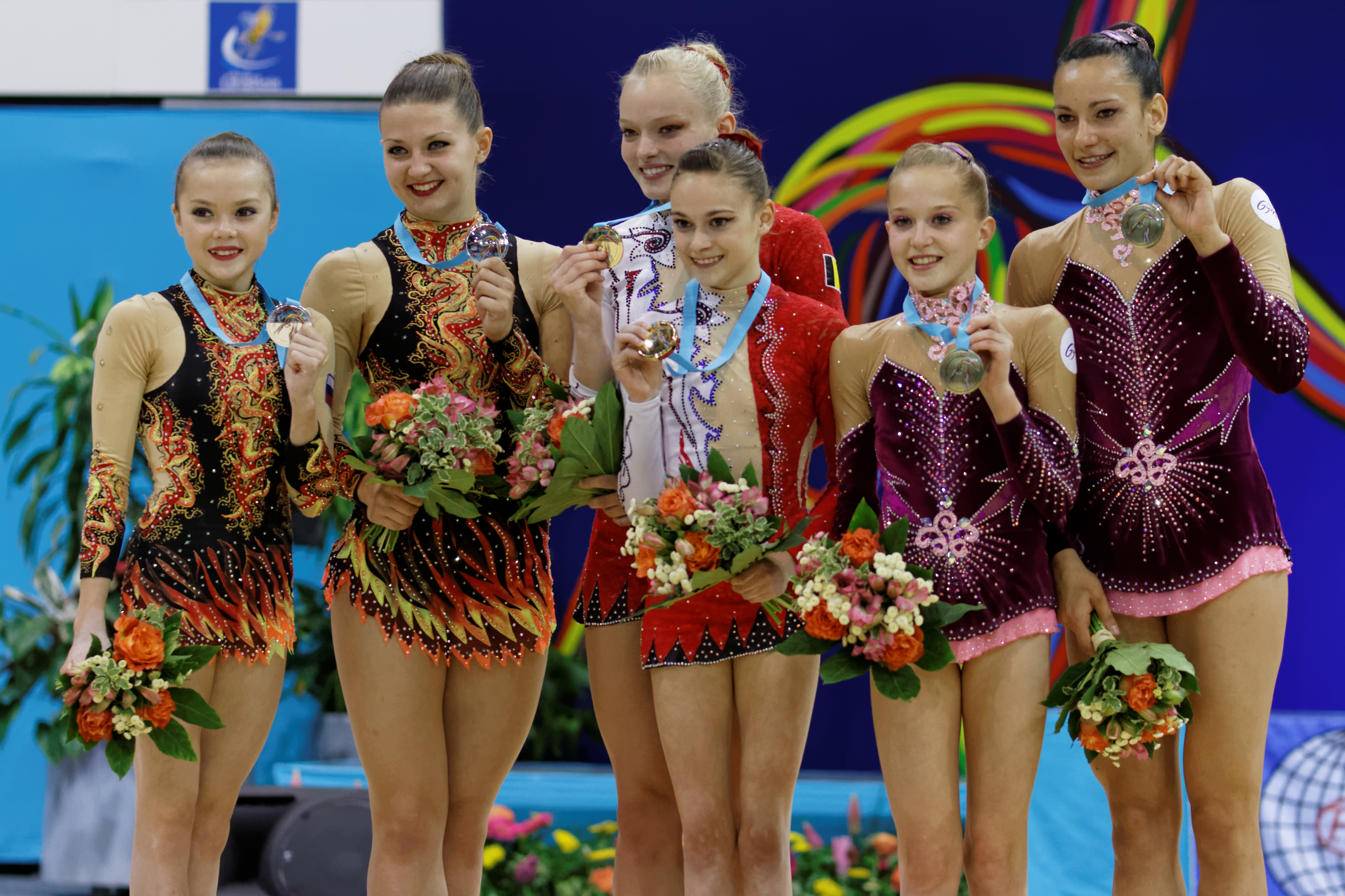
Award ceremony

The women's pair event took place on 11 July.

| Position | Team | Difficulty | Artistry | Execution | Pen. | Total |
|---|---|---|---|---|---|---|
| 1st place, gold medalist(s) | Belgium; Nikki Snel; Eline de Smedt | 10.650 | 9.050 | 8.825 | 0.000 | 28.525 |
| 2nd place, silver medalist(s) | Russia; Valentina Kim; Elizaveta Dubrovina | 10.280 | 8.200 | 8.500 | 0.000 | 26.980 |
| 3rd place, bronze medalist(s) | France; Claire Philouze; Léa Roussel | 10.200 | 8.100 | 8.275 | 0.000 | 26.575 |
| 4 | Belarus; Marharyta Bartashevich; Viktoriya Mikhnovich | 10.040 | 8.225 | 8.450 | 0.300 | 26.415 |
| 5 | North Korea; Jong Kum Hwa; Kim Hye Song | 10.750 | 7.850 | 7.600 | 0.600 | 25.600 |
| 6 | Ukraine; Anastasiia Veresova; Ella Bohdanova | 10.030 | 7.875 | 7.550 | 0.000 | 25.455 |

=== Men's Pairs ===
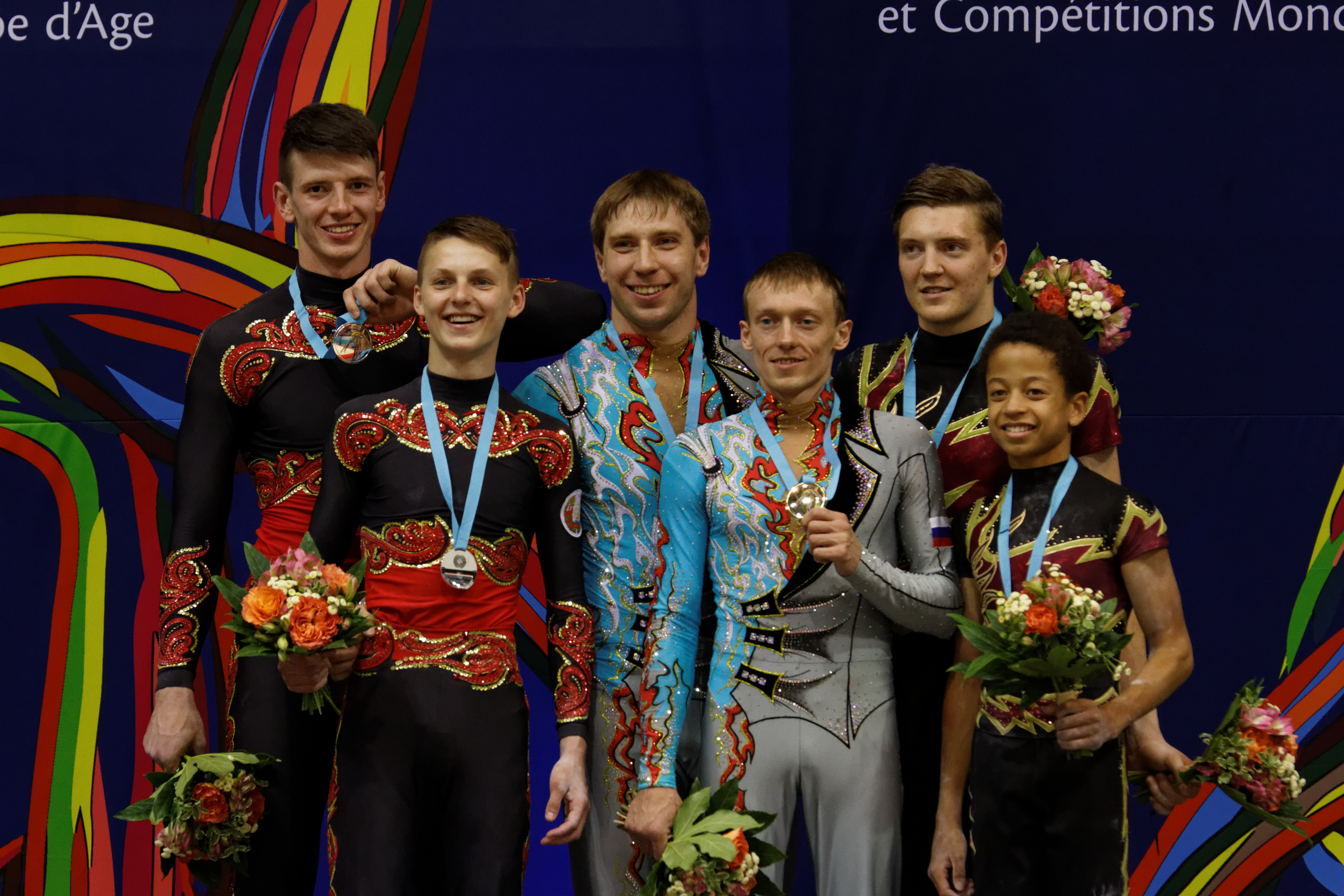
Award ceremony

The men's pair event took place on 11 July.

| Position | Team | Difficulty | Artistry | Execution | Pen. | Total |
|---|---|---|---|---|---|---|
| 1st place, gold medalist(s) | Russia; Konstantin Pilipchuk; Aleksei Dudchenko | 10.760 | 8.825 | 8.700 | 0.000 | 28.285 |
| 2nd place, silver medalist(s) | Belarus; Ilya Rybinski; Yauheni Novikau | 10.710 | 8.800 | 8.700 | 0.000 | 28.210 |
| 3rd place, bronze medalist(s) | United Kingdom; Kieran Whittle; Farai Bright-Garamukanwa | 10.050 | 8.400 | 8.575 | 0.000 | 27.025 |
| 4 | Belgium; Vincent Casse; Arne Van Gelder | 10.120 | 8.525 | 8.300 | 0.000 | 26.945 |
| 5 | China; Zhang Shaolong; Li Ziyang | 10.880 | 7.750 | 8.050 | 0.000 | 26.680 |
| 6 | Ukraine; Andrii Kobchyk; Vladyslav Bobryshev | 10.140 | 8.100 | 7.900 | 0.300 | 25.840 |

=== Mixed Pairs ===
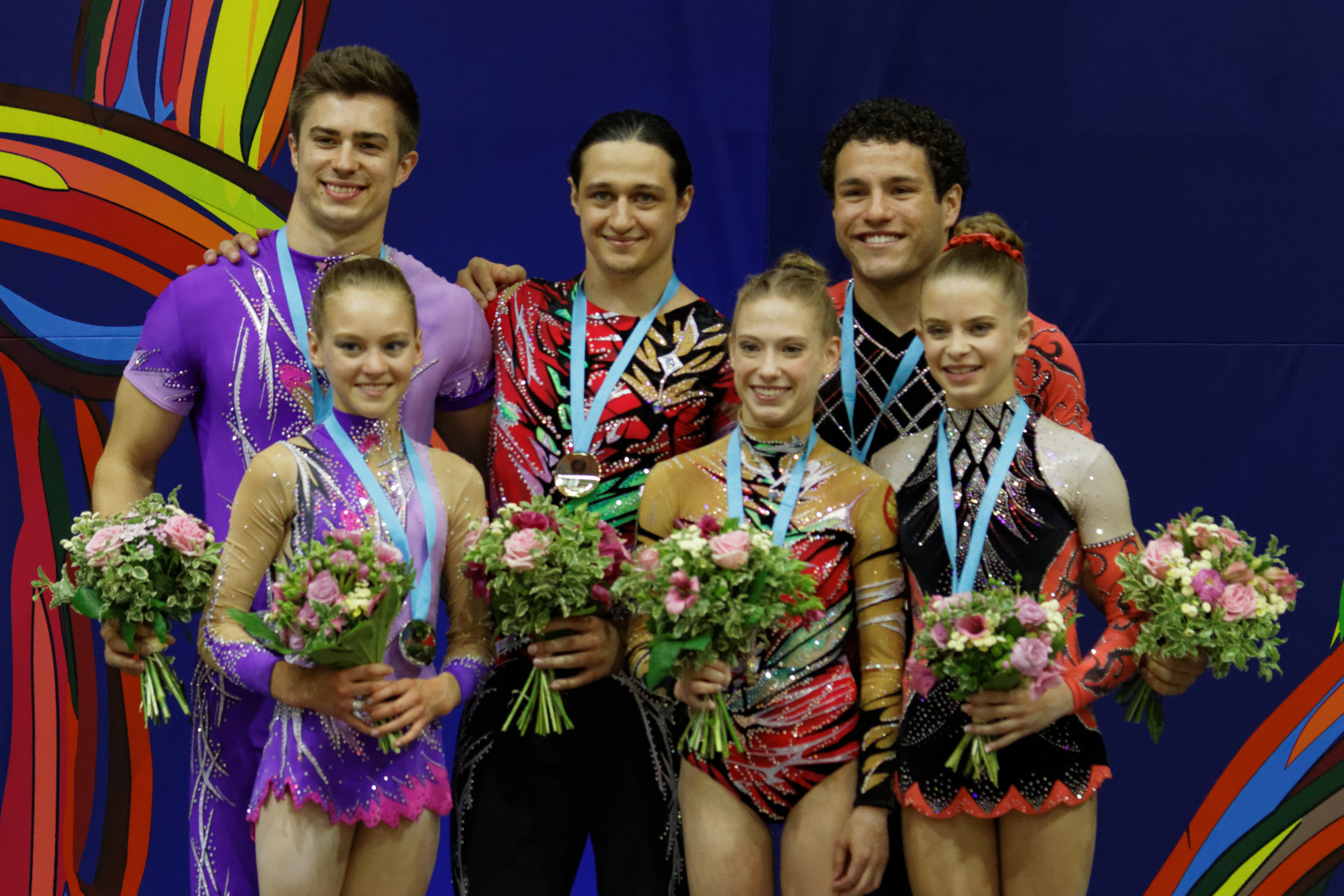
Award ceremony

The mixed pairs event was held on 12 July.

| Position | Team | Difficulty | Artistry | Execution | Pen. | Total |
|---|---|---|---|---|---|---|
| 1st place, gold medalist(s) | Russia; Revaz Gurgenidze; Marina Chernova | 11.960 | 8.800 | 8.850 | 0.000 | 29.610 |
| 2nd place, silver medalist(s) | United Kingdom; Dominic Smith; Alice Upcott | 11.870 | 8.650 | 9.000 | 0.000 | 29.520 |
| 3rd place, bronze medalist(s) | United States; Ryan Ward; Kiley Boynton | 12.360 | 8.200 | 8.800 | 0.000 | 29.360 |
| 4 | Belgium; Solano Cassamajor; Yana Vastavel | 11.390 | 8.925 | 9.000 | 0.000 | 29.315 |
| 5 | China; Shen Yunyun; Wu Wenhui | 11.300 | 8.050 | 8.500 | 0.000 | 27.850 |
| 6 | Ukraine; Oleksandr Shpyn; Yelyzaveta Vasylyga | 11.490 | 8.150 | 8.125 | 0.000 | 27.765 |
| 7 | France; Alexis Martin; Camille Curti | 10.800 | 8.250 | 8.300 | 0.000 | 27.350 |
| 8 | Belarus; Viktar Lebedzeu; Iryna Kuksa | 10.520 | 8.200 | 8.525 | 0.300 | 26.945 |

=== Women's Group ===
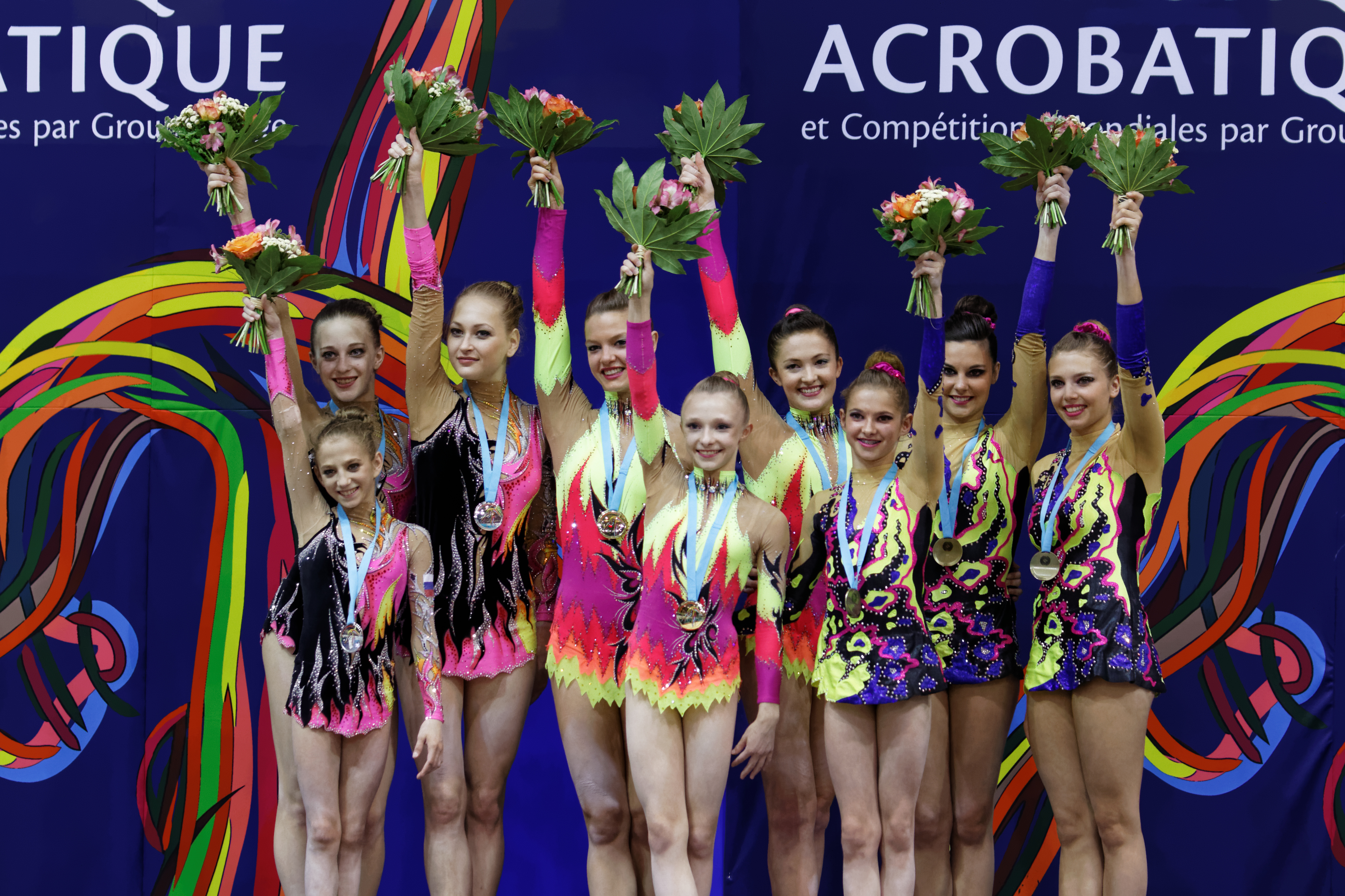
Award Ceremony

The women's group event was held on 12 July.

| Position | Team | Difficulty | Artistry | Execution | Pen. | Total |
|---|---|---|---|---|---|---|
| 1st place, gold medalist(s) | United Kingdom; Elise Matthews; Georgia Lancaster; Millie Spalding | 10.510 | 8.800 | 9.000 | 0.000 | 28.310 |
| 2nd place, silver medalist(s) | Russia; Valeriia Belkina; Victoria Ilicheva; Alena Kholod | 10.850 | 8.650 | 8.650 | 0.000 | 28.150 |
| 3rd place, bronze medalist(s) | Belgium; Julie van Gelder; Ineke van Schoor; Kaat Dumarey | 10.540 | 8.900 | 8.500 | 0.000 | 27.940 |
| 4 | North Korea; Ri Jin Hwa; Ri Hyang; Kim Un Sol | 10.960 | 8.250 | 8.500 | 0.000 | 27.710 |
| 5 | Belarus; Yuliya Ramanenka; Julia Kovalenko; Angelina Sandovich | 10.490 | 8.450 | 8.550 | 0.000 | 27.490 |
| 6 | Australia; Elizabeth Jacobs; Amy Lang; Elodie Rousseau Forwood | 10.400 | 8.625 | 8.550 | 0.300 | 27.275 |
| 7 | France; Madeleine Bayon; Alizée Costes; Noémie Nadaud | 10.440 | 8.300 | 8.450 | 0.000 | 27.190 |
| 8 | Portugal; Bárbara da Silva Sequeira; Iris Mendes; Jéssica Correia | 10.670 | 8.250 | 8.050 | 0.600 | 26.370 |

=== Men's Group ===
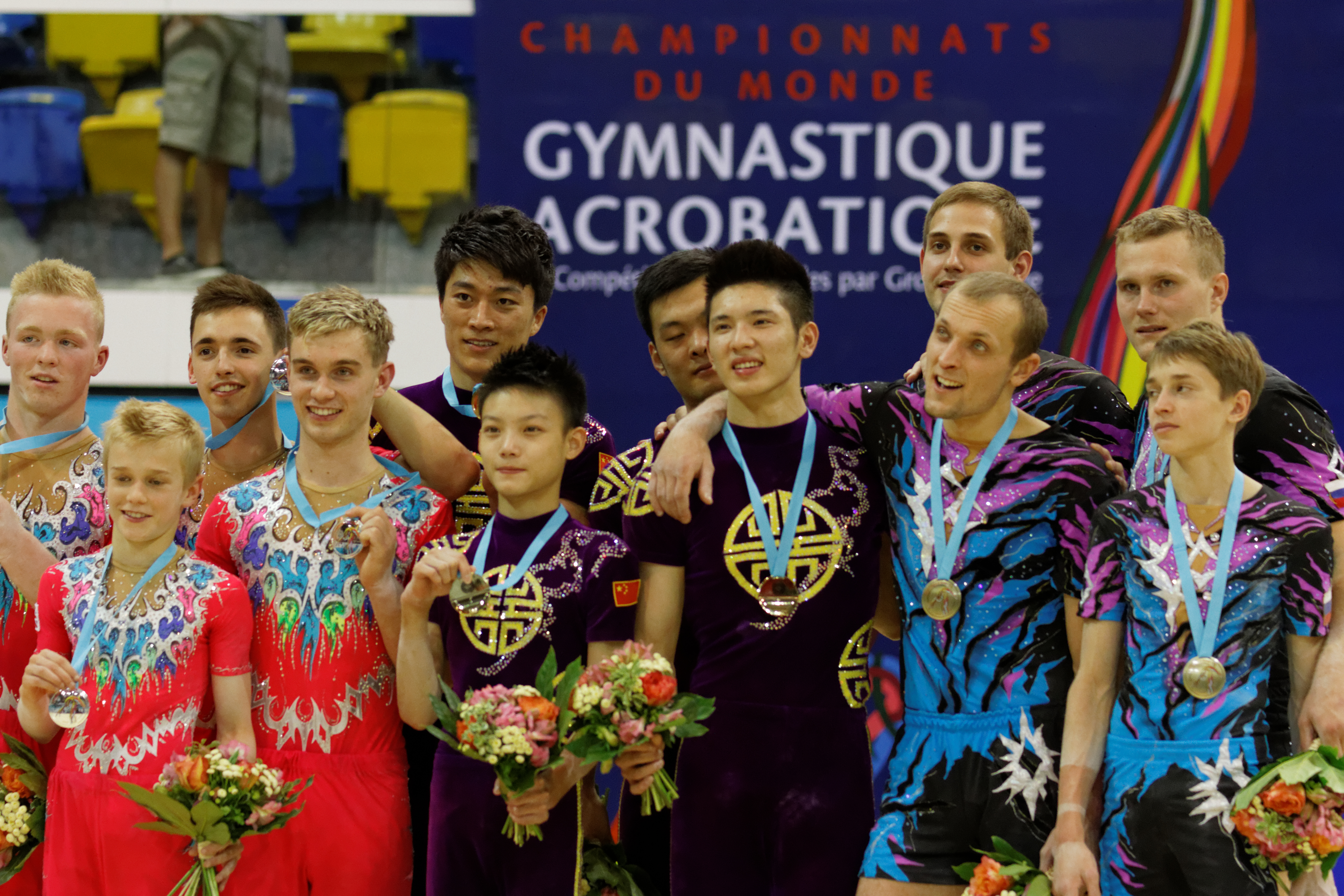
Award ceremony

The men's group event was held on 12 July.

| Position | Team | Difficulty | Artistry | Execution | Pen. | Total |
|---|---|---|---|---|---|---|
| 1st place, gold medalist(s) | China; Zhou Yi (gymnast)|Zhou Yi; Wang Lei (gymnast)|Wang Lei; Tang Jian (gymnast)|Tang Jian; Wu Yeqiuyin | 12.070 | 8.650 | 8.900 | 0.000 | 29.620 |
| 2nd place, silver medalist(s) | United Kingdom; Connor Bartlett; Gareth Wood; Daniel Cook (gymnast)|Daniel Cook; George Wood (gymnast)|George Wood | 11.480 | 8.950 | 9.050 | 0.000 | 29.480 |
| 3rd place, bronze medalist(s) | Russia; Valentin Chetverkin; Maksim Chulkov; Aleksandr Kurasov; Dmitry Bryzgalov | 12.050 | 8.600 | 8.700 | 0.000 | 29.350 |
| 4 | Bulgaria; Dennis Andreev; Borislav Borisov (gymnast)|Borislav Borisov; Vladislav Borisov (gymnast)|Vladislav Borisov; Hristo Dimitrov (gymnast)|Hristo Dimitrov | 10.010 | 8.400 | 8.575 | 0.000 | 26.985 |
| 5 | Ukraine; Andrii Kozynko; Oleksandr Nelep; Oleksii Lesyk; Viktor Iaremchuk | 10.270 | 8.150 | 8.125 | 0.000 | 26.545 |
| 6 | Poland; Tomasz Antonowicz; Jakub Kosowicz; Wojciech Krysiak; Radoslaw Trojan | 9.430 | 7.950 | 8.150 | 0.000 | 25.530 |

== Participating nations ==
21 nations entered the competition.

- Australia (6)
- Azerbaijan (3)
- Belgium (9)
- Belarus (18)
- Brazil (10)
- Bulgaria (4)
- China (10)
- France (10)
- Great Britain (14)
- Georgia (3)
- Germany (14)
- Hong Kong (7)
- Israel (3)
- Kazakhstan (6)
- Poland (11)
- Portugal (5)
- North Korea (5)
- Puerto Rico (2)
- Russia (24)
- Ukraine (13)
- United States (7)
