= Ella Bohdanova =

Ukrainian acrobatic gymnast (born 1996)

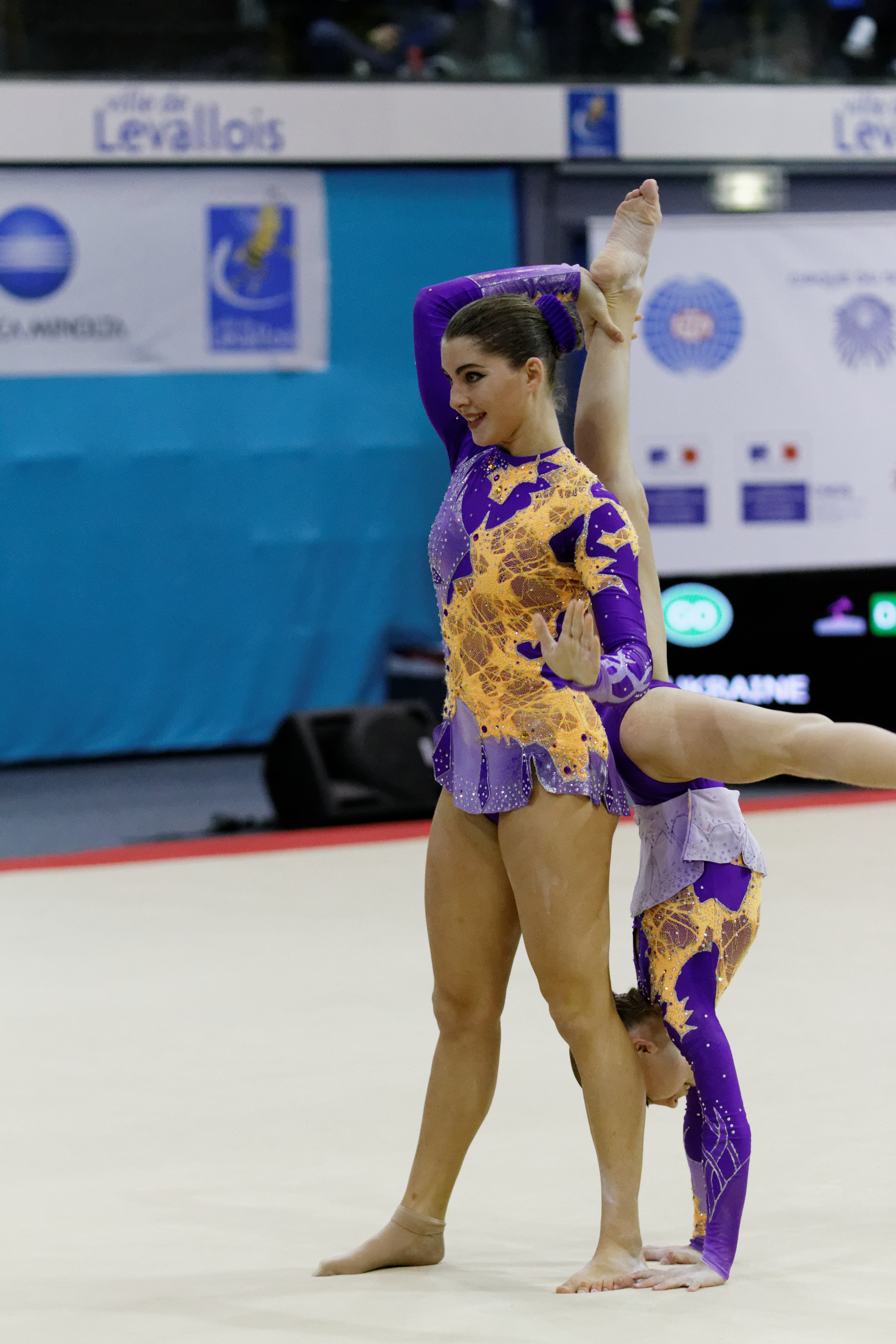
- Ella Bohdanova (left) and Anastasiia Veresova

Personal information
- Born: 11 July 1996 (age 30) Bilhorod-Dnistrovskyi

Gymnastics career
- Discipline: Acrobatic gymnastics
- Country represented: Ukraine

Ella Bohdanova or Bogdanova (born 11 July 1996) is a Ukrainian female acrobatic gymnast. With partner Anastasiia Veresova, Bohdanova achieved 6th in the 2014 Acrobatic Gymnastics World Championships. Retired since 2015.
