= 2014 Acrobatic Gymnastics World Championships – Men's pairs qualification =

The 24th World Acrobatic Gymnastics Championships were held in Levallois-Perret, France at the Palais des Sports Marcel-Cerdan. The men's pairs qualifications were held on 10 and 11 July 2014.

Position	Team	Balance	Dynamic	Combined	Total	Qual.
1	Russia; Konstantin Pilipchuk; Aleksei Dudchenko	29.095	28.290	27.570	84.955	Q
2	Belarus; Ilya Rybinski; Yauheni Novikau	27.885	28.080	28.235	84.200	Q
3	Russia; Igor Mishev; Nikolay Suprunov	28.480	27.850	27.230	83.560	
4	United Kingdom; Kieran Whittle; Farai Bright-Garamukanwa	27.115	27.210	26.600	80.925	Q
5	Ukraine; Andrii Kobchyk; Vladyslav Bobryshev	27.290	27.145	26.440	80.875	Q
6	China; Zhang Shaolong; Li Ziyang	26.705	27.140	26.720	80.565	Q
7	Belgium; Vincent Casse; Arne Van Gelder	26.950	25.460	26.970	79.380	Q
8	Kazakhstan; Daniyar Muslimov; Sultanbek Naisbayev	26.410	26.425	24.280	79.015	R
9	Poland; Adam Wojtacki; Oskar Piotrowski	26.410	26.425	24.280	77.115	R
10	Puerto Rico; Kevin Garcia Maldonado; Christian Morales	23.760	25.455	23.310	72.525	-
11	Germany; Patrick Schoenholz; Johannes Weisse	25.800	22.850	23.515	72.165	-
