= Acrobatic gymnastics at the 2025 World Games – Men's group =

Men's group at the 2025 World Games
- Venue: Dong'an Lake Sports Park Gymnasium, Chengdu, China
- Date: 10 August
- Competitors: 24 from 6 nations
- Winning total: 29.890 points

Medalists
1st place, gold medalist(s)		Or Abraham; Rotem Amihai; Lior Borodin; Tomer Offir	Israel
2nd place, silver medalist(s)		Stanislav Kukurudz; Yurii Push; Yuriy Savka; Taras Yarush	Ukraine
3rd place, bronze medalist(s)		Louis Alexander; Rex Booth; Samuel Ditchburn; Freddie Turner	Great Britain

The men's group competition at the 2025 World Games took place on 10 August at the Dong'an Lake Sports Park Gymnasium in Chengdu, China.

== Competition format ==
The top 4 teams in qualifications, based on combined scores of each round, advanced to the final. The scores in qualification do not count in the final.

== Results ==
=== Qualification ===
The results were as follows;

Team	Balance		Dynamic		Total (All-around)	
Team	Score	Rank	Score	Rank	Score	Rank
China	29.060	1	29.140	1	58.200	1
Israel	28.530	3	28.570	2	57.100	2
Ukraine	28.640	2	28.120	3	56.760	3
Great Britain	27.390	6	27.700	4	55.090	4
Azerbaijan	28.260	4	26.370	6	54.630	5
Germany	28.050	5	26.490	5	54.540	6

=== Final ===
The results were as follows;

Rank	Team	Difficulty	Artistry	Execution	Penalty	Total (All-around)
Rank	Team	Score	Score	Score	Score	Score
1st place, gold medalist(s)	Israel	3.290	9.000	17.600		29.890
2nd place, silver medalist(s)	Ukraine	2.960	8.700	17.200		28.860
3rd place, bronze medalist(s)	Great Britain	2.010	9.100	17.000		28.110
4	China	3.230	8.000	15.600	-0.700	26.130
