= Yuriy Savka =

Ukrainian acrobatic gymnast (born 2004)

- Born: 15 July 2004 (age 22) Lviv, Ukraine

Gymnastics career
- Discipline: Acrobatic gymnastics
- Country represented: Ukraine
- Head coaches: Kostiantyn Kukurudz; Angela Boiko
Medal record
Men's acrobatic gymnastics
Representing Ukraine
World Games
Silver medal – second place	2025 Chengdu	Group all-around
Bronze medal – third place	2022 Birmingham	Group all-around
World Championships
Bronze medal – third place	2020 Geneva	Group all-around
Bronze medal – third place	2024 Guimarães	Group all-around
Bronze medal – third place	2024 Guimarães	Group balance
European Championships
Silver medal – second place	2023 Varna	Group dynamic
Silver medal – second place	2025 Luxembourg	Group balance
Bronze medal – third place	2019 Holon	Group dynamic
Bronze medal – third place	2021 Pesaro	Group all-around

Yuriy Ihorovych Savka (Ukrainian: Юрій Ігорович Савка, born 15 July 2004 in Lviv) is a Ukrainian male acrobatic gymnast.

== Career ==
In 2018, Yuriy won a first gold medal at the FIG Acrobatic Gymnastics World Cup in Puurs in the group all-around event.

At the 2019 Acrobatic Gymnastics European Championships, held in Holon, Yuriy with Stanislav Kukurudz, Yurii Push and Taras Yarush won a bronze medal in the group dynamic event.

In 2021, Savka won a first bronze medal at the World Championships, held in Geneva, in the group all-around event. He also won a bronze medal in the group all-around event at the 2021 Acrobatic Gymnastics European Championships.

In 2022, Yuriy won a first bronze medal at the World Games in Birmingham in the group all-around event.

The following year, he won a first silver medal at the European Championships, held in Varna, in the group dynamic event.
