= Taisiia Marchenko =

Ukrainian acrobatic gymnast

- Born: 17 February 2006 (age 20) Sumy, Ukraine

Gymnastics career
- Discipline: Acrobatic gymnastics
- Country represented: Ukraine
- Head coaches: Victoria Korzhova; Natalia Cherniak
Medal record
Women's acrobatic gymnastics
Representing Ukraine
World Games
Gold medal – first place	2022 Birmingham	Pairs all-around
European Championships
Gold medal – first place	2021 Pesaro	Pairs dynamic
Bronze medal – third place	2021 Pesaro	Pairs all-around

Taisiia Iaroslavivna Marchenko (Ukrainian: Таїсія Ярославівна Марченко, born 17 February 2006 in Sumy) is a Ukrainian female acrobatic gymnast.

== Career ==
In 2021, Taisiia with her partner Viktoriia Kozlovska won a gold medal at the FIG Acro World Cup stage in Sofia. They also competed at the World Championships, held in Geneva, in the pair all-around event, finishing 6th in finals and 1st in qualifications.

At the 2021 Acrobatic Gymnastics European Championships Viktoriia and Taisiia won a gold medal in the pairs dynamic event and a bronze medal in the pairs all-around one.

In 2022, the duo won a gold medal in the pairs all-around event at the World Games in Birmingham.
