= Viktoriia Kozlovska =

Ukrainian acrobatic gymnast

- Born: 12 April 2001 (age 25) Kryvyi Rih, Dnipropetrovsk oblast, Ukraine

Gymnastics career
- Discipline: Acrobatic gymnastics
- Country represented: Ukraine
- Head coaches: Alla Saberzanova; Sergiy Poslushny
Medal record
Women's acrobatic gymnastics
Representing Ukraine
World Games
| Gold medal – first place | 2022 Birmingham | Pairs all-around |
European Championships
| Gold medal – first place | 2021 Pesaro | Pairs dynamic |
| Bronze medal – third place | 2021 Pesaro | Pairs all-around |
European Junior Championships
| Silver medal – second place | 2019 Holon | Pairs dynamic |

Viktoriia Vitaliivna Kozlovska (Ukrainian: Вікторія Віталіївна Козловська, born 12 April 2001 in Kryvyi Rih) is a Ukrainian female acrobatic gymnast.

== Career ==
Viktoriia debuted her career in 2017, when she finished 3rd in the pair all-around at the All-Ukrainian tournament named after Valerii Iakovlev.

The following years, she competed at the 2019 Acrobatic Gymnastics European Championships (junior level) with her partner Valeriia Kobets, winning a silver medal in the pairs dynamic event.

In 2021, Viktoriia with her partner Taisiia Marchenko won a gold medal at the World Cup stage in Sofia. They also competed at the World Championships, held in Geneva, in the pair all-around event, finishing 6th in finals and 1st in qualifications.

At the 2021 Acrobatic Gymnastics European Championships Viktoriia and Taisiia won a gold medal in the pairs dynamic event and a bronze medal in the pairs all-around one.

In 2022, the duo won a gold medal in the pairs all-around event at the World Games in Birmingham.
