= Bohdan Pohranychnyi =

Ukrainian acrobatic gymnast

- Born: 29 August 2001 (age 25) Vinnytsia oblast, Ukraine

Gymnastics career
- Discipline: Acrobatic gymnastics
- Country represented: Ukraine
- Head coaches: Yury Goliak (national); Galyna Kovalchuk (personal)
Medal record
Men's acrobatic gymnastics
Representing Ukraine
World Games
Gold medal – first place	2022 Birmingham	Pairs all-around
European Championships
Silver medal – second place	2021 Pesaro	Pairs dynamic
European Junior Championships
Silver medal – second place	2019 Holon	Pairs dynamic

Bohdan Petrovych Pohranychnyi (Ukrainian: Богдан Петрович Пограничний, born 29 August 2001) is a Ukrainian male acrobatic gymnast.

== Career ==
Pohranychnyi began doing acrobatic gymnastics, when he was seven.

In 2018, Pohranychnyi with his partner Danylo Stetsiuk won a gold medal at the Ukrainian National Junior Championships, held in Lviv, in the pairs all-around event.

The following year, the duo won a silver medal at the 2019 Acrobatic Gymnastics European Championships in the pairs dynamic event among juniors.

In 2020, the duo won a silver medal at the Ukrainian Cup among adults in the pairs all-around event.

In 2021, firstly Pohranychnyi and Stetsiuk received a gold medal in the pairs all-around event at the Ukrainian tournament "Spring Star", held in Kryvyi Rih. Later, they competed at the 2021 Acrobatic Gymnastics European Championships, winning a silver medal in the pairs dynamic event. They also competed at the 2020 Acrobatic Gymnastics World Championships, finishing 6th in the pairs all-around event.

In 2022, the duo won a gold medal in the pairs all-around event at the World Games in Birmingham. The duo also won a gold medal in the pairs all-around event at the Rzeszów FIG Acro World Cup and a silver one in the same event at XVI Maia International Acro Cup.
