= Anastasiia Semenovych =

Ukrainian acrobatic gymnast

- Full name: Anastasiia Romanivna Semenovych
- Born: 9 August 2007 (age 19) Drohobych, Lviv oblast, Ukraine

Gymnastics career
- Discipline: Acrobatic gymnastics
- Country represented: Ukraine
- Head coaches: Oksana Zhguta; Zhanna Zhguta
Medal record
Mixed acrobatic gymnastics
Representing Ukraine
World Championships
| Gold medal – first place | 2024 Guimarães | Pair dynamic |
European Championships
| Silver medal – second place | 2023 Varna | Pair all-around |
| Silver medal – second place | 2023 Varna | Pair balance |
| Silver medal – second place | 2023 Varna | Pair dynamic |
| Silver medal – second place | 2025 Luxembourg | Pair dynamic |

Anastasiia Romanivna Semenovych (Ukrainian: Анастасія Романівна Семенович, born 9 August 2007 in Drohobych) is a Ukrainian acrobatic gymnast, who completes in mixed pair with Bohdan Ivanyk.

== Career ==
In 2021, Anastasiia Semenovych and her partner Bohdan Ivanyk debuted competing at the FIG Acro World Cup in Sofia, winning gold medals in mixed pair all-around among juniors. Later, they competed at the 11th FIG Acrobatic Gymnastics World Age Group Competitions in Geneva, finishing 4th in mixed pair all-around.

In 2022, Semenovych and Ivanyk competed at the World Games in Birmingham, finishing 4th in mixed pair all-around. Then they represented Ukraine at the international competition "Wars & Sawa", held in Warsaw, where they received gold medals in mixed pair all-around.

The following year, the duo competed at the 2023 Acrobatic Gymnastics European Championships in Varna, winning silver medals in mixed pair all-around, balance and dynamic.

In 2024, Anastasiia and Bohdan won gold medal in mixed pair dynamic at the Acrobatic Gymnastics World Championships in Guimarães.
