= Yurii Push =

Ukrainian acrobatic gymnast

- Born: 23 July 1997 (age 29) Lviv, Ukraine
- Height: 180 cm (5 ft 11 in)

Gymnastics career
- Discipline: Acrobatic gymnastics
- Country represented: Ukraine
- Head coaches: Kostiantyn Kukurudz; Galyna Benko
Medal record
Men's acrobatic gymnastics
Representing Ukraine
World Games
Silver medal – second place	2025 Chengdu	Group all-around
Bronze medal – third place	2022 Birmingham	Group all-around
World Championships
Bronze medal – third place	2020 Geneva	Group all-around
Bronze medal – third place	2024 Guimarães	Group all-around
Bronze medal – third place	2024 Guimarães	Group balance
European Championships
Silver medal – second place	2023 Varna	Group dynamic
Silver medal – second place	2025 Luxembourg	Group balance
Bronze medal – third place	2017 Rzeszów	Group all-around
Bronze medal – third place	2017 Rzeszów	Group dynamic
Bronze medal – third place	2019 Holon	Group dynamic
Bronze medal – third place	2021 Pesaro	Group all-around

Yurii Ihorovych Push (Ukrainian: Юрій Ігорович Пуш, born 23 July 1997 in Lviv) is a Ukrainian male acrobatic gymnast.

== Career ==
Yurii with Stanislav Kukurudz and Taras Yarush debuted competing at the 2016 Acrobatic Gymnastics World Championships in the group all-around event, finishing 4th in final and qualifying at the 2017 World Games.

The following year, he competed at the 2017 Acrobatic Gymnastics European Championships, receiving bronze medals in group dynamic and group all-around events. Stanislav represented Ukraine at the 2017 World Games, finishing 5th in group all-around event.

In 2018, Yurii with his teammates won a first gold medal at the FIG Acrobatic Gymnastics World Cup in Puurs in the group all-around event.

At the 2019 Acrobatic Gymnastics European Championships, held in Holon, Yurii won a bronze medal in the group dynamic event.

In 2021, Yurii won a first bronze medal at the World Championships, held in Geneva, in the group all-around event. He also won a bronze medal in the group all-around event at the 2021 Acrobatic Gymnastics European Championships.

In 2022, Yurii won a first bronze medal at the World Games in Birmingham in the group all-around event.

The following year, he won a first silver medal at the European Championships, held in Varna, in the group dynamic event.
