= Arne Van Gelder =

Belgian gymnast

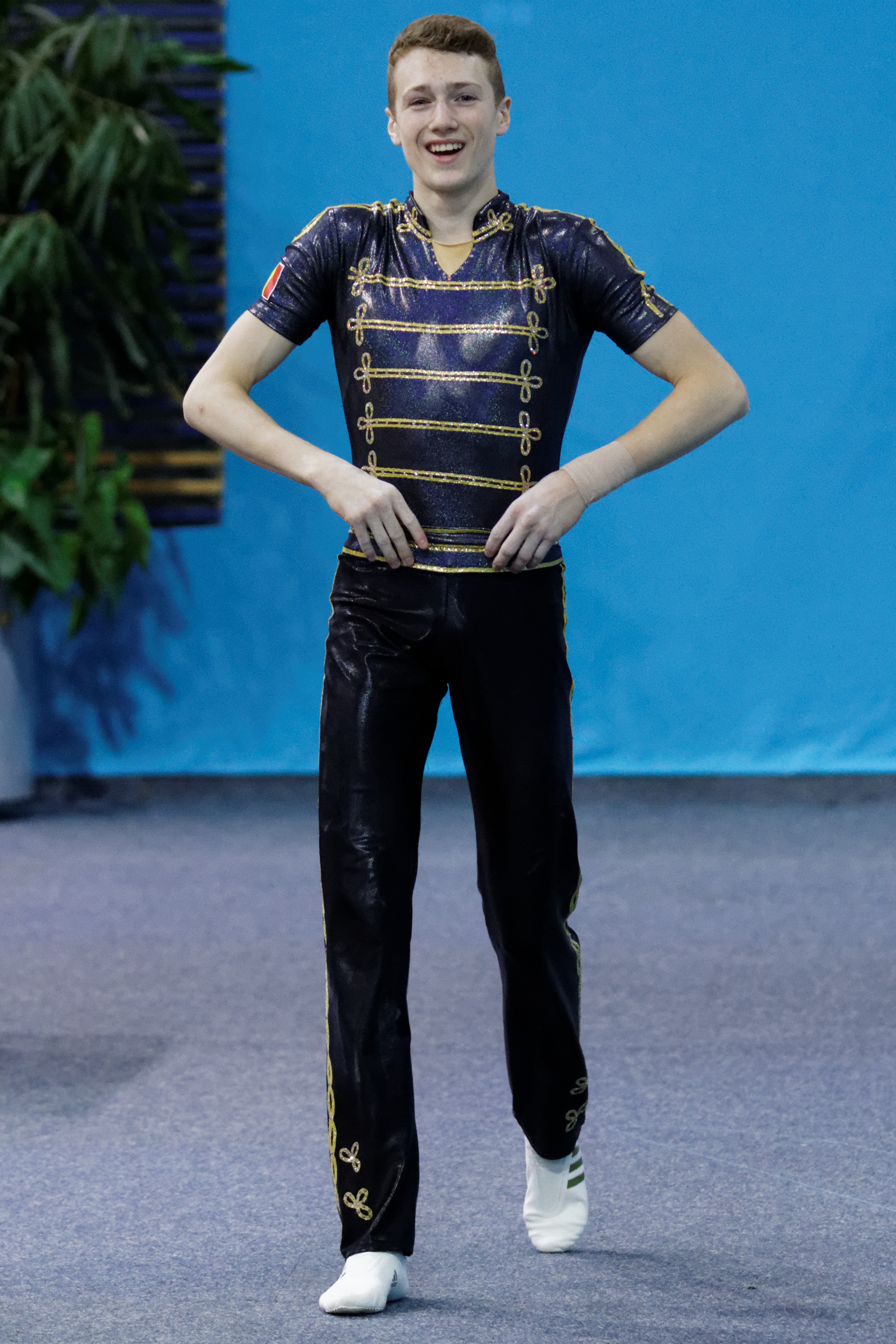
- Arne Van Gelder at the 2014 Acrobatic Gymnastics World Championships

Personal information
- Born: 13 November 1997 (age 28)

Gymnastics career
- Discipline: Acrobatic gymnastics
- Country represented: Belgium
- Club: Wild Gym

Arne Van Gelder (born 13 November 1997) was a Belgian male professional acrobatic gymnast. Arne started competing for the Belgian Federation in 2010 and retired in 2017 after a shoulder injurie.

Together with his partner, Vincent Casse, he became European Champion at the 2015 Acrobatic Gymnastics European Championships and Vice World Champion at the 2016 Acrobatic Gymnastics World Championships.

== Career ==
Arne was in the top (~flyer) position of a men's group (Men's 4) between 2009 and 2013 after which he took the top position in a Men's duo. In 2010, he joined the National team.

He competed in three consecutive World Championships between 2012 and 2016.

Between 2015 and 2016, he was placed 1st in the FIG's World Ranking in Men's pair discipline (https://nl.wikipedia.org/wiki/F%C3%A9d%C3%A9ration_Internationale_de_Gymnastique) .

== Career records ==
Belgium National Championships
Event	Discipline	Year	Ranking
National Championships	Men's group	2010	1st
National Championships	Senior Men's group	2011	1st
National Championships	Senior Men's group	2012	1st
National Championships	Senior Men's group	2013	1st
National Championships	Senior Men's pair	2014	1st
National Championships	Senior Men's pair	2015	1st
National Championships	Senior Men's pair	2016	1st

European- / World Championships
Discipline	Year	Event	Location	Ranking
Senior Men's Group	2012	FIG - Acrobatic Gymnastics World Championships	LAKE BUENA VISTA (USA)	5th
Senior Men's Group	2013	9th The World Games	Cali, Colombia	4th
Senior Men's pair	2014	FIG - Acrobatic Gymnastics World Championships	LEVALLOIS (FRA)	4th
Senior Men's pair	2015	World Cup MAIA	MAIA (POR)	2nd
Senior Men's pair	2015	Acrobatic Gymnastics European Championships	Riesa, Germany	1st
Senior Men's pair	2016	World Cup PUURS	PUURS (BEL)	1st
Senior Men's pair	2016	World Cup MAIA	MAIA (POR)	1st
Senior Men's pair	2016	FIG - Acrobatic Gymnastics World Championships	PUTIAN CITY (CHN)	2nd

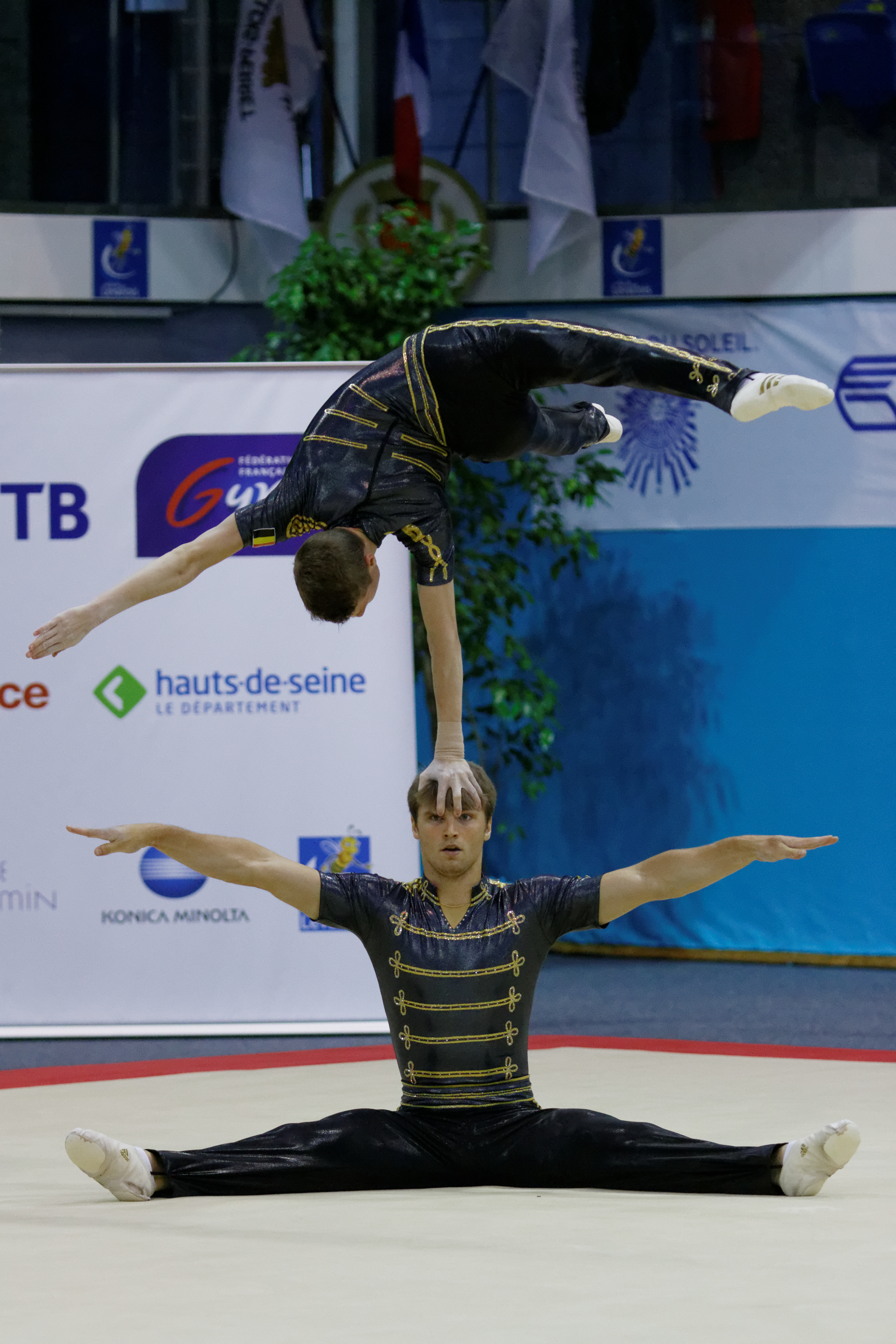
Vincent Casse and Arne Van Gelder (top) at the 2014 Acrobatic Gymnastics World Championships.
