= 2019 Acrobatic Gymnastics European Championships =

29th Acrobatic Gymnastics European Championships
- Venue: Holon Toto Hall
- Location: Holon, Israel
- Start date: 30 October 2019
- End date: 3 November 2019
- Competitors: 284 from 19 nations

The 29th Acrobatic Gymnastics European Championships was held in Holon, Israel from October 30 to November 3, 2019. The competition took place at the Holon Toto Hall. This was the first time that Israel has hosted an acrobatic gymnastics competition at an international level.

== Participating nations ==
- Austria
- Azerbaijan
- Belgium
- Belarus
- Bulgaria
- Spain
- France
- Great Britain
- Georgia
- Germany
- Hungary
- Ireland
- Israel
- Moldova (Juniors only)
- Netherlands
- Poland
- Portugal
- Russia
- Ukraine

== Schedule ==
- Wednesday, October 30
  - 13:30-14:00 Opening Ceremony
  - 14:00-16:05 Junior Qualifications - Mixed Pair (Balance) / Women's Group (Dynamic)
  - 16:15-17:50 Junior Qualifications - Men's Pair (Balance) / Men's Group (Balance) / Woman Pair (Dynamic)
  - 18:30–19:25 Junior Finals - Mixed Pair (Balance) / Women's Group (Dynamic)
  - 19:30–20:35 Junior Finals - Men's Pair (Balance) / Men's Group (Balance) / Woman Pair (Dynamic)
  - 20:40–21:05 Award Ceremony
- Thursday, October 31
  - 15:30-16:55 Senior Qualifications - Mixed Pair (Balance) / Women's Group (Dynamic)
  - 17:10-18:20 Senior Qualifications - Women's Pair (Balance) / Men's Group (Balance) / Men Pair (Dynamic)
  - 19:00–19:55 Senior Finals - Mixed Pair (Balance) / Women's Group (Dynamic)
  - 20:00–21.00 Senior Finals - Women's Pair (Balance) / Men's Group (Balance) / Men Pair (Dynamic)
  - 21:00–21:25 Award Ceremony
- Friday, November 1
  - 11:00-13:10 Junior Qualifications - Mixed Pair (Dynamic) / Women's Group (Balance)
  - 14:30-16:05 Junior Qualifications - Men's Pair (Dynamic) / Men's Group (Dynamic) / Woman Pair (Balance)
  - 16:20-17:45 Senior Qualifications - Mixed Pair (Dynamic) / Women's Groups (Balance)
  - 18:00-19:05 Senior Qualifications - Women's Pair (Dynamic) / Men's Groups (Dynamic) / Men Pairs (Balance)
- Saturday, November 2
  - 14:00-15:40 Junior All Around (Combined) Finals - Mixed Pair & Women's Group
  - 15:55-17:15 Junior All Around (Combined) Finals - Men's Pair, Men's Group & Women's Pair
  - 17:20-17:45 Award Ceremony
  - 18:00-19:20 Senior All Around Finals (Combined) - Mixed Pair & Women's Group
  - 19:30-20:35 Senior All Around Finals (Combined) - Men's Pair, Men's Group & Women's Pair
  - 20:40-21:05 Award Ceremony
- Sunday, November 3
  - 14:00-14:55 Juniors Individual Finals - Mixed pair (Dynamic) / Women's Group (Balance)
  - 15:00-16:05 Juniors Individual Finals - Men's Pair (Dynamic) / Men's Group (Dynamic) / Women's Pair (Balance)
  - 16:10-16:35 Award Ceremony
  - 17:00-17:55 Seniors Individual Finals - Mixed Pair (Dynamic) / Women's Group (Balance)
  - 18:00-18:55 Seniors Individual Finals - Woman Pair (Dynamic) / Men's Group (Dynamic) / Men's Pair (Balance)
  - 19:00-19:25 Award Ceremony
  - 19:25-19:45 Closing Ceremony

== Medal winners ==
=== Senior ===
| Event | Gold | Silver | Bronze |
|---|---|---|---|
Men's Pair
| All Around | Great Britain; Adam Upcott; Charlie Tate | Russia; Timofei Ivanov; Maksim Karavaev | Germany; Tim Sebastian; Michail Kraft |
| Balance | Germany; Tim Sebastian; Michail Kraft | Great Britain; Adam Upcott; Charlie Tate | Belarus; Artsiom Yashchanka; Aliaksei Zayats |
| Dynamic | Russia; Timofei Ivanov; Maksim Karavaev | Great Britain; James Jeffery; Aidan Lim | Belarus; Maksim Markevich; Aleh Mikhalevich |
Women's Pair
| All Around | Portugal; Ana Teixeira; Rita Ferreira | Russia; Iasmina Ishankulova; Diana Korotaeva | Ukraine; Oleksandra-Mariia Tabachynska; Yuliia Pylypiak |
| Balance | Russia; Iasmina Ishankulova; Diana Korotaeva | Portugal; Ana Teixeira; Rita Ferreira | Austria; Eva Gasser; Franziska Seiner |
| Dynamic | Portugal; Ana Teixeira; Rita Ferreira | Ukraine; Oleksandra-Mariia Tabachynska; Yuliia Pylypiak | Russia; Iasmina Ishankulova; Diana Korotaeva |
Mixed Pair
| All Around | Russia; Viktoria Aksenova; Kirill Startsev | Belarus; Hanna Kasyan; Konstantin Evstafeev | Netherlands; Stef Van Der Locht; Fenne Van Dijck |
| Balance | Russia; Viktoria Aksenova; Kirill Startsev | Belarus; Hanna Kasyan; Konstantin Evstafeev | Azerbaijan; Abdulla Al-Mashaykhi; Ruhidil Gurbanli |
| Dynamic | Russia; Viktoria Aksenova; Kirill Startsev | Belarus; Artur Beliakou; Volha Melnik | Azerbaijan; Abdulla Al-Mashaykhi; Ruhidil Gurbanli |
Men's group
| All Around | Russia; German Kudriashov; Alexander Sorokin; Kirill Zadorin; Valeriy Tukhashvili | Portugal; Miguel Silva; Henrique Pinheiro; Frederico Silva; Henrique Silva | Belgium; Jonas Anthoon; Robin Casse; Hannes Garre; Noam Raj Patel |
| Balance | Russia; German Kudriashov; Alexander Sorokin; Kirill Zadorin; Valeriy Tukhashvili | Belgium; Jonas Anthoon; Robin Casse; Hannes Garre; Noam Raj Patel | Portugal; Miguel Silva; Henrique Pinheiro; Frederico Silva; Henrique Silva |
| Dynamic | Portugal; Miguel Silva; Henrique Pinheiro; Frederico Silva; Henrique Silva | Russia; German Kudriashov; Alexander Sorokin; Kirill Zadorin; Valeriy Tukhashvili | Ukraine; Stanislav Kukurudz; Yuriy Savka; Yurii Push; Taras Yarush |
Women's group
| All Around | Belgium; Talia De Troyer; Britt Vanderdonckt; Charlotte Van Royen | Portugal; Francisca Sampaio Maia; Francisca Maia; Bárbara Sequeira | Great Britain; Erin Henderson; Sacha Muir; Chloe Rowlands |
| Balance | Belgium; Talia De Troyer; Britt Vanderdonckt; Charlotte Van Royen | Portugal; Francisca Sampaio Maia; Francisca Maia; Bárbara Sequeira | Israel; Or Armony; Tzlil Hurvitz; Yarin Ovadia |
| Dynamic | Belgium; Talia De Troyer; Britt Vanderdonckt; Charlotte Van Royen | Portugal; Francisca Sampaio Maia; Francisca Maia; Bárbara Sequeira | Belarus; Hanna Katsuba; Darya Ivaniutsenka; Krystsina Lishova |

=== Junior ===
| Event | Gold | Silver | Bronze |
|---|---|---|---|
Men's Pair
| All Around | Russia; Andrei Zuev; Artem Simonov | Azerbaijan; Daniel Abbasov; Murad Rafiyev | Great Britain; Samuel Large; Sammi Nassman |
| Balance | Great Britain; Samuel Large; Sammi Nassman | Russia; Andrei Zuev; Artem Simonov | Azerbaijan; Daniel Abbasov; Murad Rafiyev |
| Dynamic | Azerbaijan; Daniel Abbasov; Murad Rafiyev | Ukraine; Bohdan Pohranychnyi; Danylo Stetsiuk | Great Britain; Samuel Large; Sammi Nassman |
Women's Pair
| All Around | Israel; Almog Green; Maayan Zunenshine | Belarus; Palina Kunouskaya; Aliona Traulka | Belgium; Majlen Mattheessens; Nadoua Zaidi |
| Balance | Israel; Almog Green; Maayan Zunenshine | Russia; Daria Kiseleva; Aleksandra Koriakina | Belarus; Palina Kunouskaya; Aliona Traulka |
| Dynamic | Israel; Almog Green; Maayan Zunenshine | Ukraine; Viktoriia Kozlovska; Valeriia Kobets | Belarus; Palina Kunouskaya; Aliona Traulka |
Mixed Pair
| All Around | Great Britain; Ella Hanna Sanz; Jordan Franklin | Russia; Mariia Boitsova; Kirill Romanov | Israel; Meron Weissman; Daria Gurovych |
| Balance | Great Britain; Ella Hanna Sanz; Jordan Franklin | Russia; Mariia Boitsova; Kirill Romanov | Israel; Meron Weissman; Daria Gurovych |
| Dynamic | Belarus; Viktoryia Akhotnikava; Ilya Famenkou | Russia; Mariia Boitsova; Kirill Romanov | Great Britain; Ella Hanna Sanz; Jordan Franklin |
Men's group
| All Around | Israel; Adam Nudel; Nevo Moshe Gavra; Tomer Offir; Yorai Kleiman | Russia; Platon Liapustin; Sergei Kochkin; Daniel Zeinalian; Vladislav Nikolaenko | Great Britain; Max Crawford; Kieran Holbrook; Andrew Morris-Hunt; Cameron Patrick-Lothian |
| Balance | Israel; Adam Nudel; Nevo Moshe Gavra; Tomer Offir; Yorai Kleiman | Great Britain; Max Crawford; Kieran Holbrook; Andrew Morris-Hunt; Cameron Patrick-Lothian | Russia; Platon Liapustin; Sergei Kochkin; Daniel Zeinalian; Vladislav Nikolaenko |
| Dynamic | Great Britain; Max Crawford; Kieran Holbrook; Andrew Morris-Hunt; Cameron Patrick-Lothian | Israel; Adam Nudel; Nevo Moshe Gavra; Tomer Offir; Yorai Kleiman | Russia; Renat Aliev; Maksim Mashketov; Daniil Viuterikh; Daniil Leontev |
Women's group
| All Around | Israel; Meshi Hurvitz; Nikol Aleinik; Inbal Zeitounei | Russia; Daria Tikhomirova; Sofia Polishchuk; Inna Yumasheva | Ukraine; Viktoriia Kunitska; Oleksandra Malchuk; Daryna Pomianovska |
| Balance | Israel; Meshi Hurvitz; Nikol Aleinik; Inbal Zeitounei | Ukraine; Viktoriia Kunitska; Oleksandra Malchuk; Daryna Pomianovska | Russia; Daria Tikhomirova; Sofia Polishchuk; Inna Yumasheva |
| Dynamic | Russia; Daria Tikhomirova; Sofia Polishchuk; Inna Yumasheva | Ukraine; Viktoriia Kunitska; Oleksandra Malchuk; Daryna Pomianovska | Israel; Meshi Hurvitz; Nikol Aleinik; Inbal Zeitounei |

== Medal table ==
| Rank | Nation | Gold | Silver | Bronze | Total |
|---|---|---|---|---|---|
| 1 | Russia | 4 | 1 | 1 | 6 |
| 2 | Portugal | 2 | 1 | 0 | 3 |
| 3 | Belarus | 0 | 3 | 0 | 3 |
| 4 | Ukraine | 0 | 1 | 1 | 2 |
| 5 | Azerbaijan | 0 | 0 | 2 | 2 |
| 6 | Austria | 0 | 0 | 1 | 1 |
| 6 | Netherlands | 0 | 0 | 1 | 1 |
| Totals (7 entries) | | 6 | 6 | 6 | 18 |
