= Íris Mendes =

Portuguese acrobatic gymnast

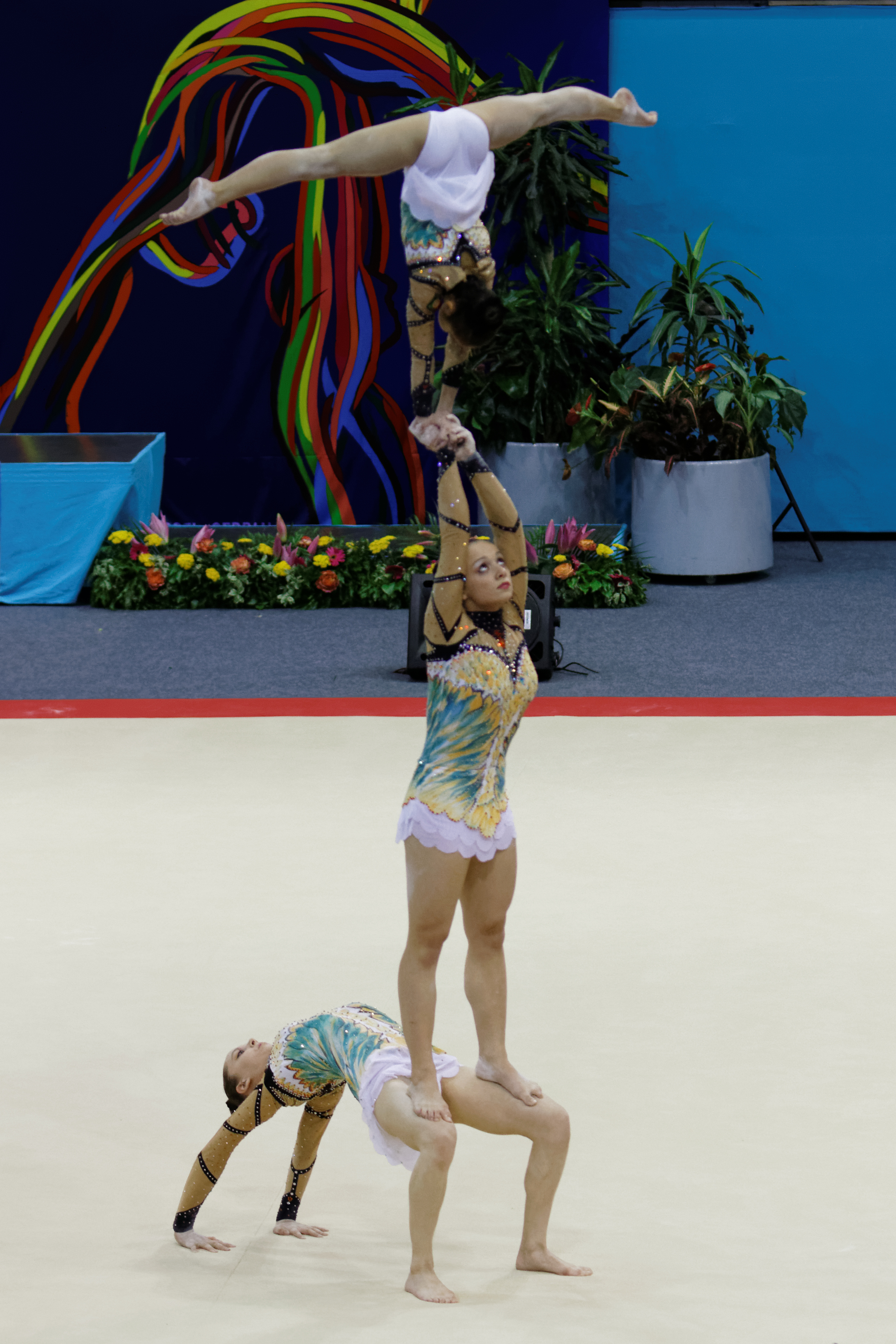

Personal information
- Born: 3 June 1996 (age 30)

Gymnastics career
- Discipline: Acrobatic gymnastics
- Country represented: Portugal

Íris Mendes (born 3 June 1996) is a Portuguese female acrobatic gymnast. With partners Bárbara da Silva Sequeira and Jéssica Correia, Mendes participated in the 2014 FIG Acro World Cup series, the first of which was in Maia, Portugal, and got 3rd place in the first round; at the end the trio achieved 5th place. In the second World Cup in the series in Aalen, Germany, they got the bronze medal. Later that year, the same trio achieved 8th in the 2014 Acrobatic Gymnastics World Championships.
