= Acrobatic gymnastics at the 2022 World Games =

- Venue: Legacy Arena
- Dates: 15–17 July
- No. of events: 5

The acrobatic gymnastics competition at the 2022 World Games took place in July 2022, in Birmingham in the United States, at the Legacy Arena. Originally scheduled to take place in July 2021, the Games were rescheduled for July 2022 as a result of the 2020 Summer Olympics postponement due to the COVID-19 pandemic.

== Medal table ==
* Host nation (United States)

Rank	Nation	Gold	Silver	Bronze	Total
1	Belgium	2	1	0	3
2	Ukraine	2	0	2	4
3	Great Britain	1	0	0	1
4	Portugal	0	2	0	2
5	United States*	0	1	1	2
6	Germany	0	1	0	1
7	Israel	0	0	1	1
7	Kazakhstan	0	0	1	1
Totals (8 entries)		5	5	5	15

== Medalists ==
Event	Gold	Silver	Bronze
Men's pair	Ukraine; Bohdan Pohranychnyi; Danylo Stetsiuk	United States; Braiden McDougall; Angel Felix	Kazakhstan; Daniyel Dil; Vadim Shulyar
Women's pair	Ukraine; Viktoriia Kozlovska; Taisiia Marchenko	Portugal; Rita Teixeira; Rita Ferreira	United States; Katie Borcherding; Cierra McKown
Mixed pair	Belgium; Bram Röttger; Helena Heijens	Germany; Daniel Blintsov; Pia Schuetze	Israel; Meron Weissman; Adi Horwitz
Men's group	Great Britain; Bradley Gold; Archie Goonesekera; Finlay Gray; Andrew Morris-Hunt	Belgium; Jonas Raus; Viktor Vermeire; Wannes Vlaeminck; Simon de Wever	Ukraine; Stanislav Kukurudz; Yurii Push; Yuriy Savka; Taras Yarush
Women's group	Belgium; Kim Bergmans; Lise de Meyst; Bo Hollebosch	Portugal; Francisca Maia; Beatriz Carneiro; Barbara Sequeira	Ukraine; Daryna Pomianovska; Oleksandra Malchuk; Viktoriia Kunitska
