= Axl Osborne =

American acrobatic gymnast

- Born: December 31, 1995 (age 30)

Gymnastics career
- Discipline: Acrobatic gymnastics
- Country represented: United States; (2)
- Gym: WOGA
Medal record
Acrobatic gymnastics
Representing United States
World Championships
Silver medal – second place	2016 Putian	Mixed Pair

Axl Osborne (born December 31, 1995) is an acrobatic gymnast. He currently competes as the base in a mixed pair with his partner Tiffani Williams. With partner Tiffani Williams, Osbourne came 2nd at the 2016 Acrobatic Gymnastics World Championships. He previously competed as the base in a Level 9 mixed pair with his partner, acrobatic gymnast Lydia Webb.

The pair train together at World Olympic Gymnastics Academy (WOGA) in north Texas, which produced 2016 Rio de Janeiro Olympics team gold medalist and uneven bars silver medallist Madison Kocian, 2008 Beijing Olympics women’s all-around gymnastics champion Nastia Liukin and 2004 Athens Olympics champion Carly Patterson.

Before Osborne’s partnership with Webb, he and male acrobatic gymnast Dylan Inserra trained together at WOGA and competed as an elite men’s pair for several years.

In November 2008, Inserra and Osborne qualified for elite status during a competition at the Karolyi Ranch in New Waverly, Texas.

Osborne and Inserra won the men’s pair senior national title at both the 2009 Acrobatic Gymnastics Championships in Dallas, Texas and at the 2010 championships in Kissimmee, Florida, where the pair won both the dynamic and the balance events.

They were two-time members of the U.S. senior national team.

Internationally, the pair competed at the 2010 Acrobatic Gymnastics World Championships in Wrocław, Poland, where they placed seventh. and at the 2010 Volkov Cup in Novgorod, Russia, where they placed fourth.

Osborne and Inserra disbanded after the 2010 season, and Osborne began training in a mixed pair with WOGA acrobatic gymnast Webb.

At the 2011 Acro Cup in Huntsville, Texas, Osborne and Webb placed second all-around in the age group 11-16.

In June 2011, the pair qualified to the 2011 National Championships in San Jose, California, on July 22–27, where they won the gold medal for mixed pair 16 and under. Osborne and Webb were also named to the Acrobatic Gymnastics Development Team "B" by USA Gymnastics.
