= 2021 Acrobatic Gymnastics European Championships =

30th Acrobatic Gymnastics European Championships
- Venue: Auditorium Scavolini
- Location: Pesaro, Italy
- Start date: 29 September 2021
- End date: 3 October 2021

The 30th Acrobatic Gymnastics European Championships is being held in Pesaro, Italy from September 29 to October 3, 2021. The competition is taking place in the Auditorium Scavolini.

== Medal summary ==
=== Senior ===
Event	Gold	Silver	Bronze
Men's Pair
All Around	Russia; Timofei Ivanov; Maksim Karavaev	United Kingdom; Samuel Large; Sammi Nassman	Belarus; Artsiom Yashchanka; Aliaksei Zayats
Balance	Russia; Timofei Ivanov; Maksim Karavaev	United Kingdom; Samuel Large; Sammi Nassman	Belarus; Artsiom Yashchanka; Aliaksei Zayats
Dynamic	Russia; Timofei Ivanov; Maksim Karavaev	Ukraine; Danylo Stetsiuk; Bohdan Pohranychnyi	United Kingdom; Samuel Large; Sammi Nassman
Women's Pair
All Around	Portugal; Rita Ferreira; Ana Teixeira	Israel; Almog Green; Maayan Zunenshine	Ukraine; Viktoriia Kozlovska; Taisiia Marchenko
Balance	Portugal; Rita Ferreira; Ana Teixeira	Russia; Amina Omari; Diana Korotaeva	Israel; Almog Green; Maayan Zunenshine
Dynamic	Ukraine; Viktoriia Kozlovska; Taisiia Marchenko	Israel; Almog Green; Maayan Zunenshine	Portugal; Rita Ferreira; Ana Teixeira
Mixed Pair
All Around	Russia; Victoria Aksenova; Kirill Startsev	Azerbaijan; Raziya Seyidli; Rahimov Aghasif	Germany; Pia Schuetze; Daniel Blintsov
Balance	Russia; Victoria Aksenova; Kirill Startsev	Germany; Pia Schuetze; Daniel Blintsov	United Kingdom; Dylan Howells; Natasha Hutchinson
Dynamic	Russia; Victoria Aksenova; Kirill Startsev	Spain; Ismael Medina; Luz Lupianez	Azerbaijan; Raziya Seyidli; Rahimov Aghasif
Men's group
All Around	Israel; Amir Daus; Lior Borodin; Tomer Offir; Hen Banuz	Belgium; Simon De Wever; Wannes Vlaeminck; Jonas Raus; Viktor Vermeire	Ukraine; Stanislav Kukurudz; Yuriy Savka; Yurii Push; Taras Yarush
Balance	Russia; Bogdan Makeev; Viktor Grechukhin; Dmitrii Slabukha; Vadim Nabiev	Belgium; Simon De Wever; Wannes Vlaeminck; Jonas Raus; Viktor Vermeire	United Kingdom; Andrew Morris-Hunt; Bradley Gold; Finlay Gray; Archie Goonesekera
Dynamic	Russia; German Kudriashov; Kirill Zadorin; Valeriy Tukhashvili; Mikhail Vikhrov	United Kingdom; Andrew Morris-Hunt; Bradley Gold; Finlay Gray; Archie Goonesekera	Israel; Amir Daus; Lior Borodin; Tomer Offir; Hen Banuz
Women's group
All Around	Russia; Daria Tikhomirova; Sofia Polishchuk; Daria Chebulanka	Belgium; Kim Bergmans; Bo Hollebosch; Lise De Meyst	Portugal; Francisca Sampaio Maia; Francisca Maia; Bárbara Sequeira
Balance	Russia; Daria Tikhomirova; Sofia Polishchuk; Daria Chebulanka	Portugal; Francisca Sampaio Maia; Francisca Maia; Bárbara Sequeira	Belarus; Krystsina Lishova; Darya Ivaniutsenka; Hanna Katsuba
Dynamic	Russia; Daria Tikhomirova; Sofia Polishchuk; Daria Chebulanka	Portugal; Maria Mendes; Raquel Fernandes; Mariana Rocha	Belgium; Kim Bergmans; Bo Hollebosch; Lise De Meyst

=== Junior ===
Event	Gold	Silver	Bronze
Men's Pair
All Around			
Balance	Russia; Artur Shekhel; Andrei Slivkov	Belarus; Raman Khalimonchyk; Yahor Yemelyanenka	Germany; Tobias Vitera; Albrecht Kretzschmar
Dynamic			
Women's Pair
All Around			
Balance			
Dynamic	Russia; Kira Feofilaktova; Darina Novoselova	Israel; Noa Maor; Adi Horwitz	Belarus; Palina Damaratskaya; Vera Matsko
Mixed Pair
All Around			
Balance	Russia; Aleksandra Bublik; Kirill Chipizubov	Israel; Amy Refaeli; Yonatan Fridman	Portugal; Ines Nunes; Tomas Lourenco
Dynamic			
Men's group
All Around			
Balance	Israel; Odem Gidron; Or Abraham; Or Strohmayer; Maor Nekave	United Kingdom; Ethan Law; Jack Clegg; Jake Turner; Cameron Patrick-Lothian	Russia; Semen Lvov; Maksim Korchagin; Oleg Krivenko; Timur Timergaliev
Dynamic			
Women's group
All Around			
Balance			
Dynamic	Israel; Yarden Ron; Michal Stratievsky; Tamar Stollar	Russia; Zarina Ulugkhodzhaeva; Katarina Rylova; Veronika Shestak	Azerbaijan; Leyla Bashirova; Mansuma Mammadzada; Nazrin Farmanova

== Medal table ==
* Host nation (Italy)

Rank	Nation	Gold	Silver	Bronze	Total
1	Russia	7	2	1	10
2	Israel	2	2	1	5
3	Portugal	1	1	1	3
4	Great Britain	0	1	3	4
5	Belarus	0	1	1	2
5	Belgium	0	1	1	2
5	Germany	0	1	1	2
8	Ukraine	0	1	0	1
9	Azerbaijan	0	0	1	1
Totals (9 entries)		10	10	10	30
