= Oskar Piotrowski =

Oskar Piotrowski may refer to:

- Oskar Piotrowski (chess player) (fl. 1902–1935), Polish chess master
- Oskar Piotrowski (gymnast) (born 1996), Polish acrobatic gymnast
