= Jéssica Correia =

Portuguese acrobatic gymnast

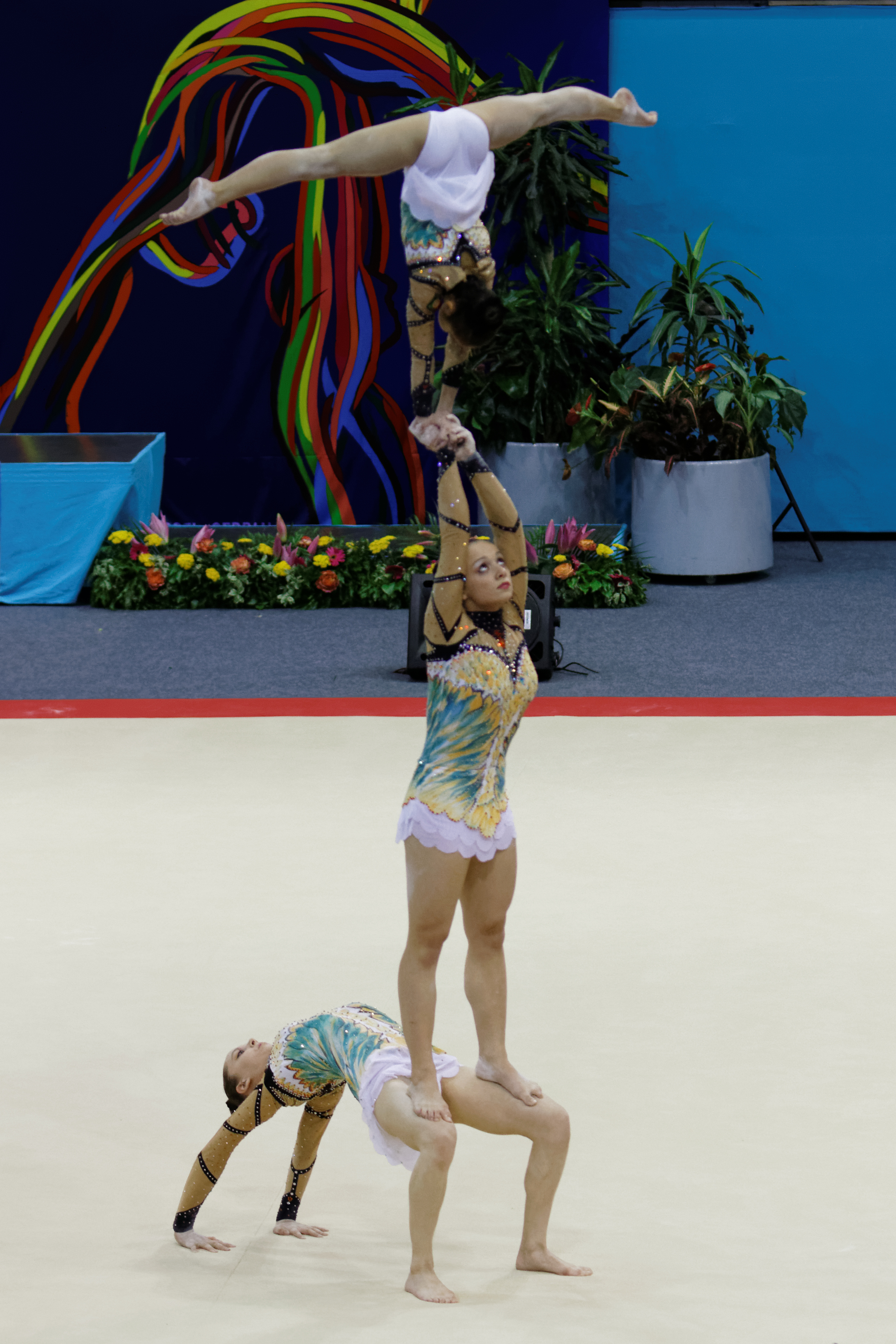

Personal information
- Born: 16 June 1999 (age 27)

Gymnastics career
- Discipline: Acrobatic gymnastics
- Country represented: Portugal

Jéssica Correia (born 16 June 1999) is a Portuguese female acrobatic gymnast. With partners Íris Mendes and Bárbara da Silva Sequeira, Correia achieved 8th in the 2014 Acrobatic Gymnastics World Championships. In 2017, she became the first Portuguese acrobat to join the Cirque du Soleil.
