= 2024 Acrobatic Gymnastics World Championships =

29th Acrobatic Gymnastics World Championships
- Venue: Guimarães Multipurpose Pavilion
- Location: Guimarães, Portugal
- Start date: 19 September 2024
- End date: 22 September 2024

The 2024 Acrobatic Gymnastics World Championships was held from 19 to 22 September 2024 in Guimarães, Portugal.

== Medal table ==
* Host nation (Portugal)

Rank	Nation	Gold	Silver	Bronze	Total
1	Belgium	5	1	0	6
2	China	5	0	1	6
3	Azerbaijan	4	1	3	8
4	Ukraine	1	2	2	5
5	Portugal*	1	2	0	3
6	Israel	0	8	3	11
7	United States	0	1	2	3
8	Spain	0	1	0	1
9	Kazakhstan	0	0	2	2
9	North Korea	0	0	2	2
11	Great Britain	0	0	1	1
Totals (11 entries)		16	16	16	48

== Medal summary ==
=== Combined ===
Event	Gold	Silver	Bronze
Team	China	Azerbaijan	Israel
Men's Pair	Azerbaijan; Daniel Abbasov; Murad Rafiyev	Portugal; Miguel Lopes; Goncalo Parreira	Kazakhstan; Daniyel Dil; Vadim Shulyar
Women's Pair	Belgium; Silke Macharis; Maysae Bouhouch	Ukraine; Ruzanna Vecheruk; Anhelina Cherniavska	Israel; Maya Velner; Rony Cohen
Mixed Pair	Azerbaijan; Aghasif Rahimov; Raziya Seyidli	Ukraine; Ivan Labunets; Yevfrosyniia Kryvytska	North Korea; RI Hyo-song; Ro Hye-song
Men's Group	China; Ma Xuefeng; Shi Jingwei; Zhang Minghe; Shi Junjie	Israel; Tomer Offir; Or Abraham; Lior Borodin; Rotem Amihai	Ukraine; Yurii Push; Taras Yarush; Stanislav Kukurudz; Yuriy Savka
Women's Group	China; Ma Yixing; Gu Quanjia; Ding Wenyan	Belgium; Lauren Verbrugghe; Sofie Jaeken; Mirte Vercauteren	Israel; Ori Dekel; Sivan Gerber; Rony Rotman

=== Balance ===
Event	Gold	Silver	Bronze
Men's Pair	Azerbaijan; Daniel Abbasov; Murad Rafiyev	Portugal; Miguel Lopes; Goncalo Parreira	Kazakhstan; Daniyel Dil; Vadim Shulyar
Women's Pair	Belgium; Silke Macharis; Maysae Bouhouch	Israel; Almog Green; Orian Yehudah	Great Britain; Natalia Gilbert; Esme Mathias
Mixed Pair	Azerbaijan; Aghasif Rahimov; Raziya Seyidli	Israel; Yonatan Fridman; Amy Refaeli	North Korea; RI Hyo-song; Ro Hye-song
Men's Group	China; Ma Xuefeng; Shi Jingwei; Zhang Minghe; Shi Junjie	Israel; Tomer Offir; Or Abraham; Lior Borodin; Rotem Amihai	Ukraine; Yurii Push; Taras Yarush; Stanislav Kukurudz; Yuriy Savka
Women's Group	Belgium; Lauren Verbrugghe; Sofie Jaeken; Mirte Vercauteren	Israel; Ori Dekel; Sivan Gerber; Rony Rotman	United States; Grace Vonder Haar; Kayla Vonder Haar; Mariam Tutberidze

=== Dynamic ===
Event	Gold	Silver	Bronze
Men's Pair	Portugal; Miguel Lopes; Goncalo Parreira	Spain; Jose Moreno; Juan Daniel Molina	Azerbaijan; Daniel Abbasov; Murad Rafiyev
Women's Pair	Belgium; Silke Macharis; Maysae Bouhouch	Israel; Maya Velner; Rony Cohen	United States; Ariana Katsov; Moraeah Arthur
Mixed Pair	Ukraine; Bohdan Ivanyk; Anastasiia Semenovych	Israel; Yonatan Fridman; Amy Refaeli	Azerbaijan; Aghasif Rahimov; Raziya Seyidli
Men's Group	China; Ma Xuefeng; Shi Jingwei; Zhang Minghe; Shi Junjie	Israel; Tomer Offir; Or Abraham; Lior Borodin; Rotem Amihai	Azerbaijan; Seymur Jafarov; Abdulla Al-Mashaykhi; Rasul Seyidli; Riad Safarov
Women's Group	Belgium; Lauren Verbrugghe; Sofie Jaeken; Mirte Vercauteren	United States; Grace Vonder Haar; Kayla Vonder Haar; Mariam Tutberidze	China; Ma Yixing; Gu Quanjia; Ding Wenyan
