= 1978 European Acrobatics Championships =

The 1st European Acrobatics Championships was held in Riga, Latvia SSR, Soviet Union 19–21 May 1978.

Only five countries competed: Soviet Union, Poland, Bulgaria, Great Britain and Hungary.

== Results ==
Event	Gold	Silver	Bronze
Men
Men's Jumps	Vadim Bindler (URS)	Plamon Yevtimov (BUL)	Andrzej Garstka (POL)
Men's Pairs	Soviet Union; Vladimir Alimanov; Vladimir Nazarov	Bulgaria; Dimitr Rusanov; Petko Petkov	Poland; Adam Klisz; Krzysztof Olendrziski
Men's Groups	Soviet Union; Yuri Derepo; Yuri Koshuba; Nikolai Artemchik; Vladimir Malyutin	Poland; Slavomir Halada; Bogdan Zając; Woitech Swiecik; Leszek Antonowicz	Bulgaria; Dimitr Dimitrov; Vicho Kolev; Emil Angelov; Yuri Indzhov
Women
Women's Jumps	Valentina Chuhareva (URS)	Grazyna Kosmola (POL)	Ludmila Tsyganova (URS)
Women's Pairs	Soviet Union; Nadezhda Tishchenko; Margarita Kuharenko	Poland; Ewa Anderszewska; Ewa Rucka	Bulgaria; Stefka Gencheva; Tanya Hristova
Women's Groups	Soviet Union; Tatyana Isayenko; Galina Korchemnaya; Galina Udodova	Poland; Agata Ostrovska; Beata Borowec; Alicia Lah	Bulgaria; Maria Dimitrova; Bonka Yencheva; Valentina Staneva
Mixed
Mixed Pairs	Soviet Union; Tatyana Krivtsova; Vyacheslav Kuznetsov	Poland; Maria Noga; Josef Radon	Bulgaria; Cvetomira Yordanova; Emil Kristev

=== Medal table ===
Rank	Nation	Gold	Silver	Bronze	Total
1	Soviet Union (URS)	7	0	1	8
2	Poland	0	5	2	7
3	Bulgaria (BUL)	0	2	4	6
Totals (3 entries)		7	7	7	21
