= Kevin Garcia Maldonado =

Puerto Rican gymnast

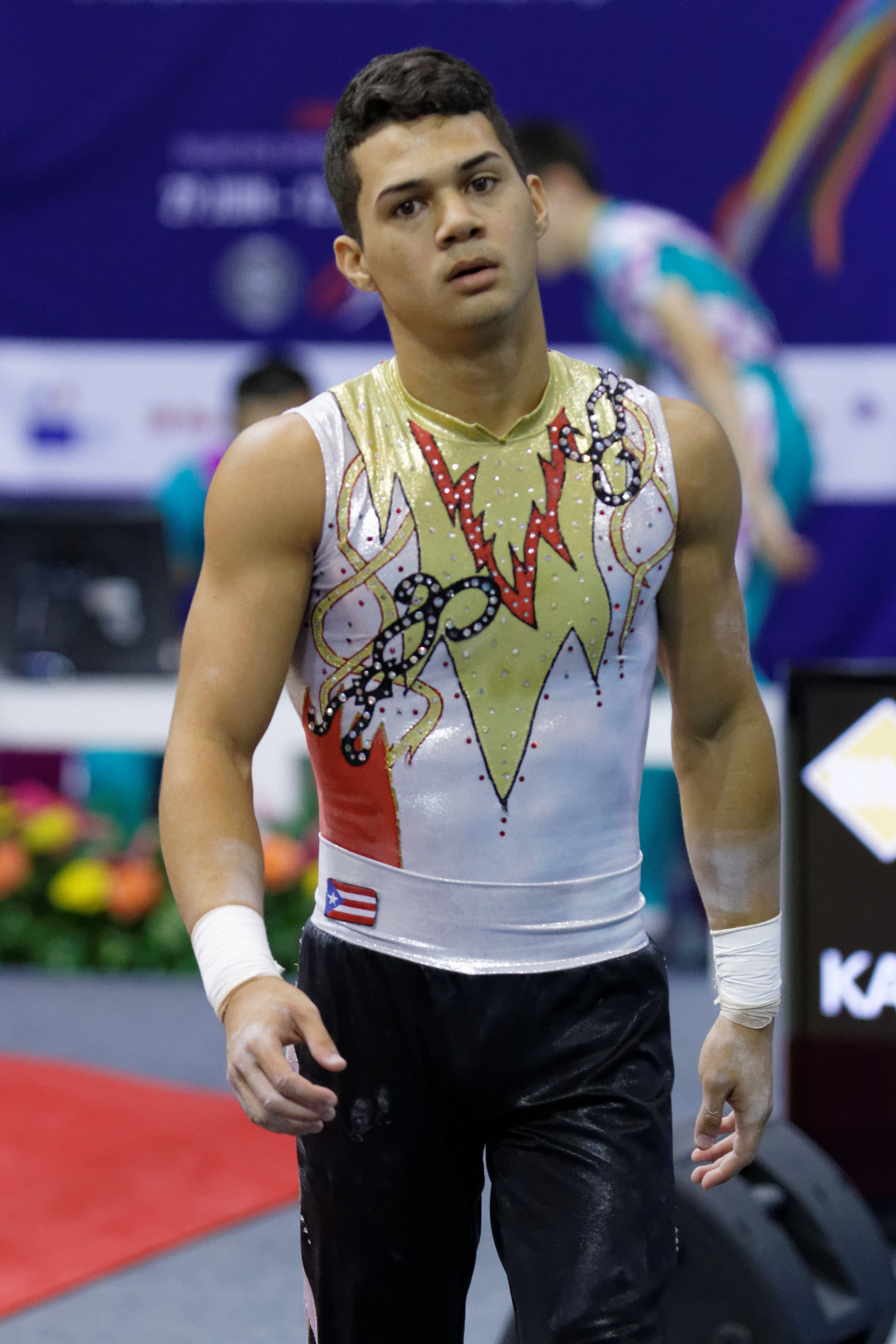
- Kevin Garcia Maldonado at the 2014 Acrobatic Gymnastics World Championships

Personal information
- Born: October 22, 1996 (age 29) Toa Baja, Puerto Rico

Gymnastics career
- Discipline: Acrobatic gymnastics
- Country represented: Puerto Rico

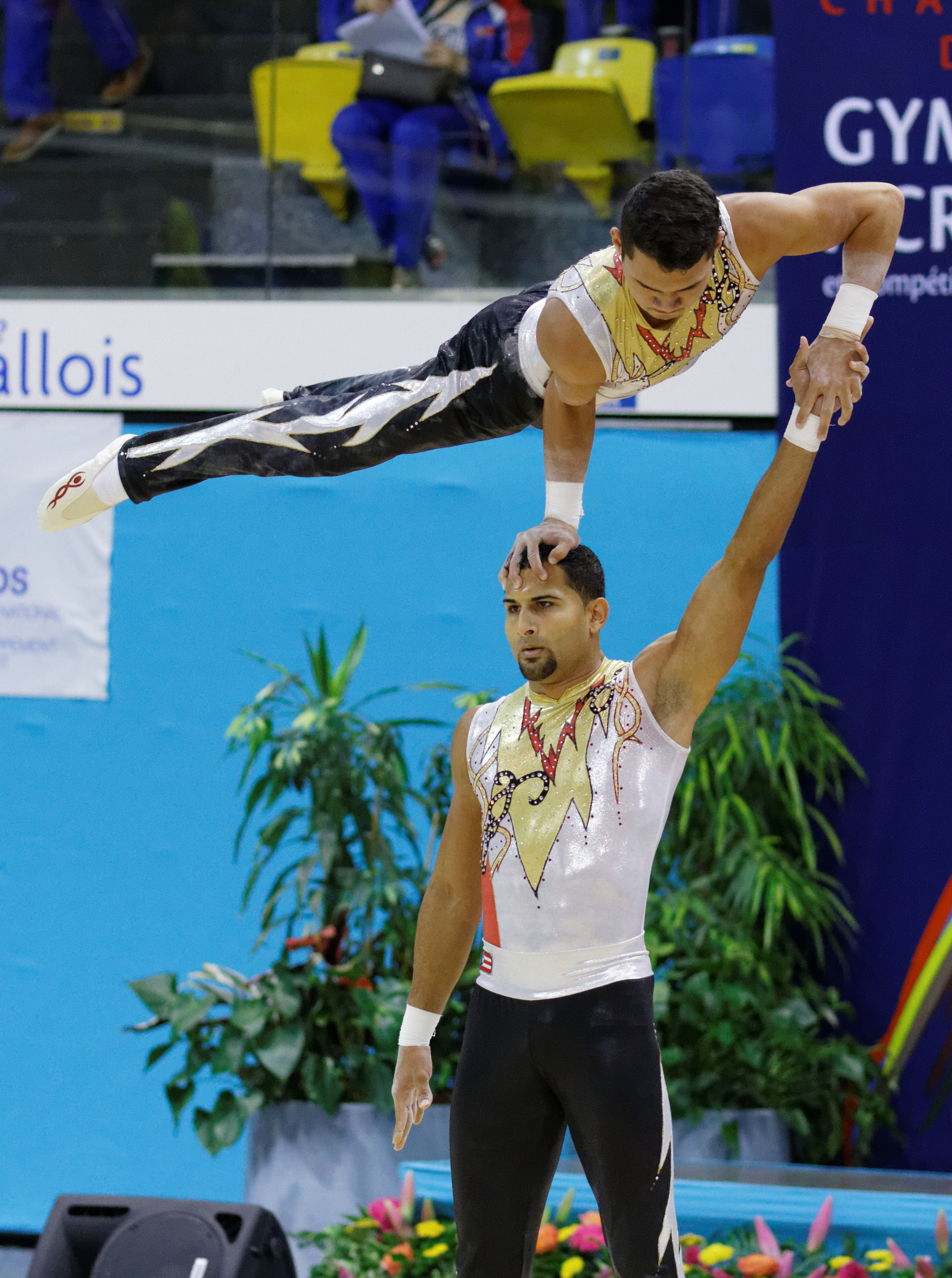
Kevin Garcia Maldonado (top) and Christian Morales at the 2014 Acrobatic Gymnastics World Championships.

Kevin Garcia Maldonado (born October 22, 1996) is a Puerto Rican male acrobatic gymnast. Along with his partner, Christian Morales, he competed in the 2014 Acrobatic Gymnastics World Championships.
