= 2017 Acrobatic Gymnastics European Championships =

28th Acrobatic Gymnastics European Championships
- Venue: Podpromie Hall
- Location: Rzeszów, Poland
- Start date: 19 October 2017
- End date: 22 October 2017
- Nations: 13

The 28th Acrobatic Gymnastics European Championships was held in Rzeszów, Poland from October 19 to October 22, 2017, at the Podpromie Hall.

== Results ==
| Event | Gold | Silver | Bronze |
|---|---|---|---|
Men's Pair
| All Around | Russia; Igor Mishev; Nikolay Suprunov | Belgium; Kilian Goffaux; Robin Casse | Belarus; Aliaksei Zayats; Artsiom Yashchanka |
| Balance | Russia; Igor Mishev; Nikolay Suprunov | Belgium; Kilian Goffaux; Robin Casse | Germany; Tim Sebastian; Michail Kraft |
| Dynamic | Belgium; Kilian Goffaux; Robin Casse | Russia; Igor Mishev; Nikolay Suprunov | Great Britain; Jake Phelan; Michael Hill |
Women's Pair
| All Around | Russia; Daria Guryeva; Daria Kalinina | Belgium; Noemie Lammertyn; Lore Vanden Berghe | Israel; Mika Lefkovits; Roni Surzon |
| Balance | Russia; Daria Guryeva; Daria Kalinina | Belgium; Noemie Lammertyn; Lore Vanden Berghe | Israel; Mika Lefkovits; Roni Surzon |
| Dynamic | Russia; Daria Guryeva; Daria Kalinina | Belgium; Noemie Lammertyn; Lore Vanden Berghe | Israel; Mika Lefkovits; Roni Surzon |
Mixed Pair
| All Around | Russia; Marina Chernova; Georgii Pataraia | Belarus; Artur Beliakou; Volha Melnik | Great Britain; Lewis Walker; Katherine Williams |
| Balance | Russia; Marina Chernova; Georgii Pataraia | Belarus; Artur Beliakou; Volha Melnik | Great Britain; Lewis Walker; Katherine Williams |
| Dynamic | Russia; Marina Chernova; Georgii Pataraia | Great Britain; Lewis Walker; Katherine Williams | Belarus; Artur Beliakou; Volha Melnik |
Men's group
| All Around | Israel; Yannay Kalfa; Daniel Uralevitch; Lidar Dana; Efi Sach | Great Britain; Lewis Watts; Conor Sawenko; Charlie Tate; Adam Upcott | Ukraine; Vladyslav Kukurudz; Stanislav Kukurudz; Yurii Push; Taras Yarush |
| Balance | Israel; Yannay Kalfa; Daniel Uralevitch; Lidar Dana; Efi Sach | Great Britain; Lewis Watts; Conor Sawenko; Charlie Tate; Adam Upcott | Russia; Vadim Nabiev; Aleksandr Pchelnikov; Victor Grechukhin; Andrei Shkvarok |
| Dynamic | Israel; Yannay Kalfa; Daniel Uralevitch; Lidar Dana; Efi Sach | Great Britain; Lewis Watts; Conor Sawenko; Charlie Tate; Adam Upcott | Ukraine; Vladyslav Kukurudz; Stanislav Kukurudz; Yurii Push; Taras Yarush |
Woman's group
| All Around | Russia; Polina Plastinina; Kseniia Zagoskina; Daria Chebulanka | United Kingdom; Isabel Haigh; Ilisha Boardman; Emily Hancock | Belarus; Karina Sandovich; Julia Ivonchyk; Veranika Nabokina |
| Balance | Russia; Polina Plastinina; Kseniia Zagoskina; Daria Chebulanka | United Kingdom; Isabel Haigh; Ilisha Boardman; Emily Hancock | Belarus; Karina Sandovich; Julia Ivonchyk; Veranika Nabokina |
| Dynamic | Russia; Polina Plastinina; Kseniia Zagoskina; Daria Chebulanka | Great Britain; Jennifer Bailey; Roxanna Parker; Gabrielle Potter | Belarus; Karina Sandovich; Julia Ivonchyk; Veranika Nabokina |

=== Medal table ===
| Rank | Nation | Gold | Silver | Bronze | Total |
|---|---|---|---|---|---|
| 1 | Russia | 11 | 1 | 1 | 13 |
| 2 | Israel | 3 | 0 | 3 | 6 |
| 3 | Belgium | 1 | 5 | 0 | 6 |
| 4 | Great Britain | 0 | 7 | 3 | 10 |
| 5 | Belarus | 0 | 2 | 5 | 7 |
| 6 | Ukraine | 0 | 0 | 2 | 2 |
| 7 | Germany | 0 | 0 | 1 | 1 |
| Totals (7 entries) | | 15 | 15 | 15 | 45 |
