= 1991 European Acrobatics Championships =

The 12th European Acrobatics Championships was held in Lisbon, Portugal 1–4 November 1991.

== Results ==
Event	Gold	Silver	Bronze
Men's Tumbling - Overall	Ingatnienkov (URS)	Ivanov (URS)	Iordan Kirilov (BUL)
Men's Tumbling - Straight Run	Ivanov (URS)	Krysztof Wilusz (POL)	Stanimir Ivanov (BUL)
Men's Tumbling - Twist Run	Iordan Kirilov (BUL)	Ingatnienkov (URS)	Tomasz Kies (POL)
Men's Pairs - Overall	Soviet Union	Poland	Bulgaria
Men's Pairs - Balance	Soviet Union	Poland	Bulgaria
Men's Pairs - Tempo	Soviet Union	Poland	Bulgaria
Men's Fours - Overall	Soviet Union	Poland	Great Britain
Men's Fours - Balance	Soviet Union	Poland	Great Britain
Men's Fours - Tempo	Soviet Union	Poland	Great Britain
Women's Tumbling - Overall	Chrystel Robert (FRA)	Iurieva (URS)	Philippa Musikant (GBR)
Women's Tumbling - Straight Run	Chrystel Robert (FRA)	Iurieva (URS)	Ildiko Dragoner (HUN)
Women's Tumbling - Twist Run	Dianna Matus (HUN)	Gosudarieva (URS)	Chrystel Robert (FRA)
Women's Pairs - Overall	Bulgaria	Soviet Union	Poland
Women's Pairs - Balance	Soviet Union	Bulgaria	Poland
Women's Pairs - Tempo	Soviet Union	Bulgaria	Poland
Women's Trio - Overall	Soviet Union	Bulgaria	Poland
Women's Trio - Balance	Soviet Union	Bulgaria	Poland
Women's Trio - Tempo	Soviet Union	Bulgaria	Poland
Mixed Pairs - Overall	Soviet Union	Bulgaria	Belgium
Mixed Pairs - Balance	Soviet Union	Bulgaria	Belgium
Mixed Pairs - Tempo	Lithuania; Natalia Redjkova; Jevgeni Marchenko	Soviet Union	Belgium

=== Medal table ===
Rank	Nation	Gold	Silver	Bronze	Total
1	Soviet Union (URS)	15	7	0	22
2	Bulgaria (BUL)	2	7	5	14
3	France (FRA)	2	0	1	3
4	Hungary (HUN)	1	0	1	2
5	Lithuania (LTU)	1	0	0	1
6	Poland (POL)	0	7	7	14
7	Great Britain (GBR)	0	0	4	4
8	Belgium (BEL)	0	0	3	3
Totals (8 entries)		21	21	21	63

== Participating nations ==
- Belgium
- Bulgaria
- France
- Great Britain
- Germany
- Greece
- Hungary
- Ireland
- Lithuania
- Poland
- Portugal
- Soviet Union
