= Bárbara Sequeira =

Portuguese acrobatic gymnast

Barbara da Silva Sequeira
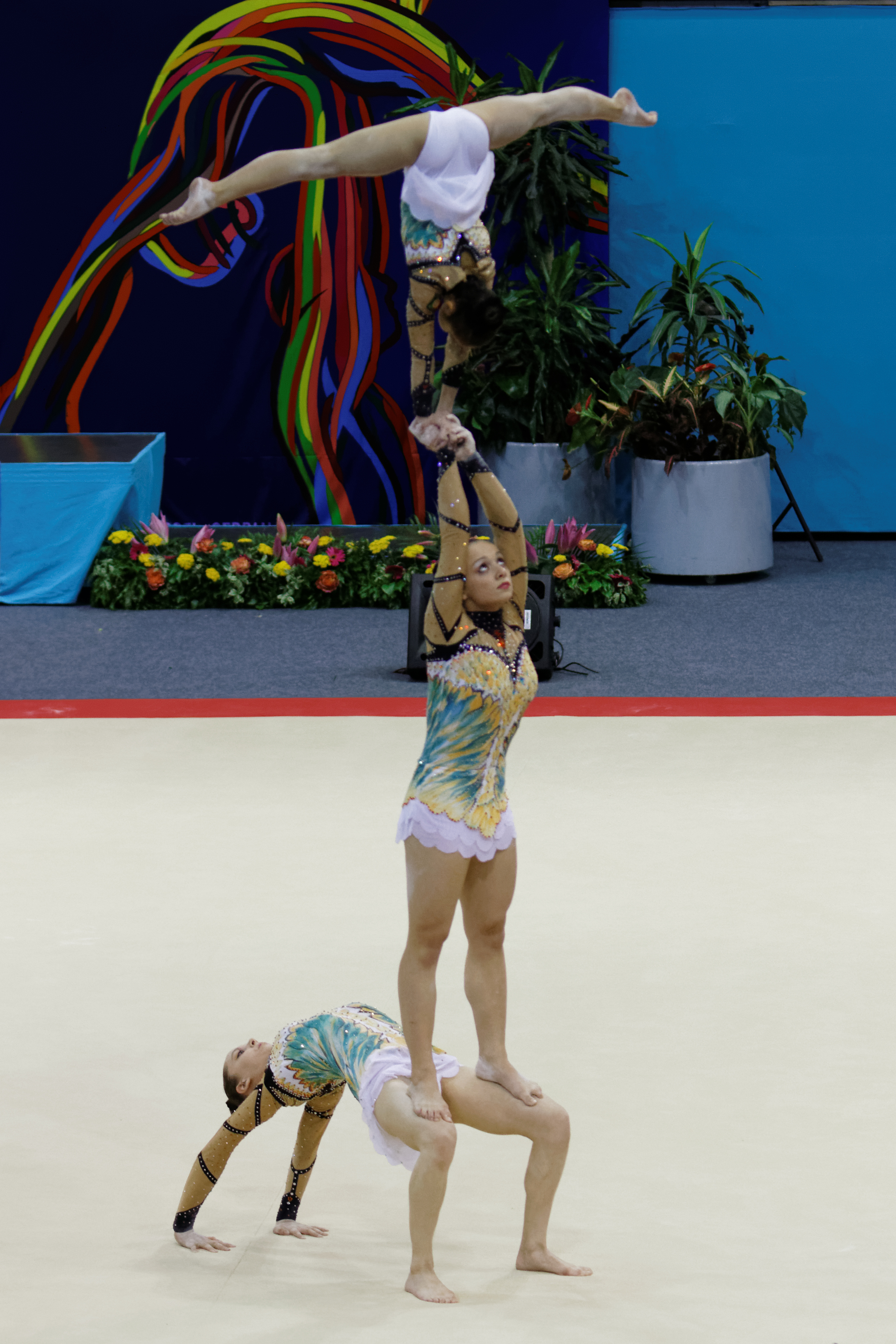

Personal information
- Born: 15 March 1996 (age 30)

Gymnastics career
- Discipline: Acrobatic gymnastics
- Country represented: Portugal
Medal record
Women's acrobatic gymnastics
Representing Portugal
European Games
Silver medal – second place	2019 Minsk	Group all-around
Silver medal – second place	2019 Minsk	Group dynamic
Bronze medal – third place	2019 Minsk	Group balance
European Championships
Silver medal – second place	2019 Holon	Group dynamic
Silver medal – second place	2019 Holon	Group balance
Silver medal – second place	2019 Holon	Group all-around
Silver medal – second place	2013 Odivelas	Group balance
Bronze medal – third place	2013 Odivelas	Group dynamic
Bronze medal – third place	2013 Odivelas	Group all-around

Bárbara da Silva Sequeira (born 15 March 1996) is a Portuguese female acrobatic gymnast. With partners Iris Mendes and Jessica Correia, Silva Sequeira achieved 8th in the 2014 Acrobatic Gymnastics World Championships.
