= Christian Morales =

Puerto Rican gymnast

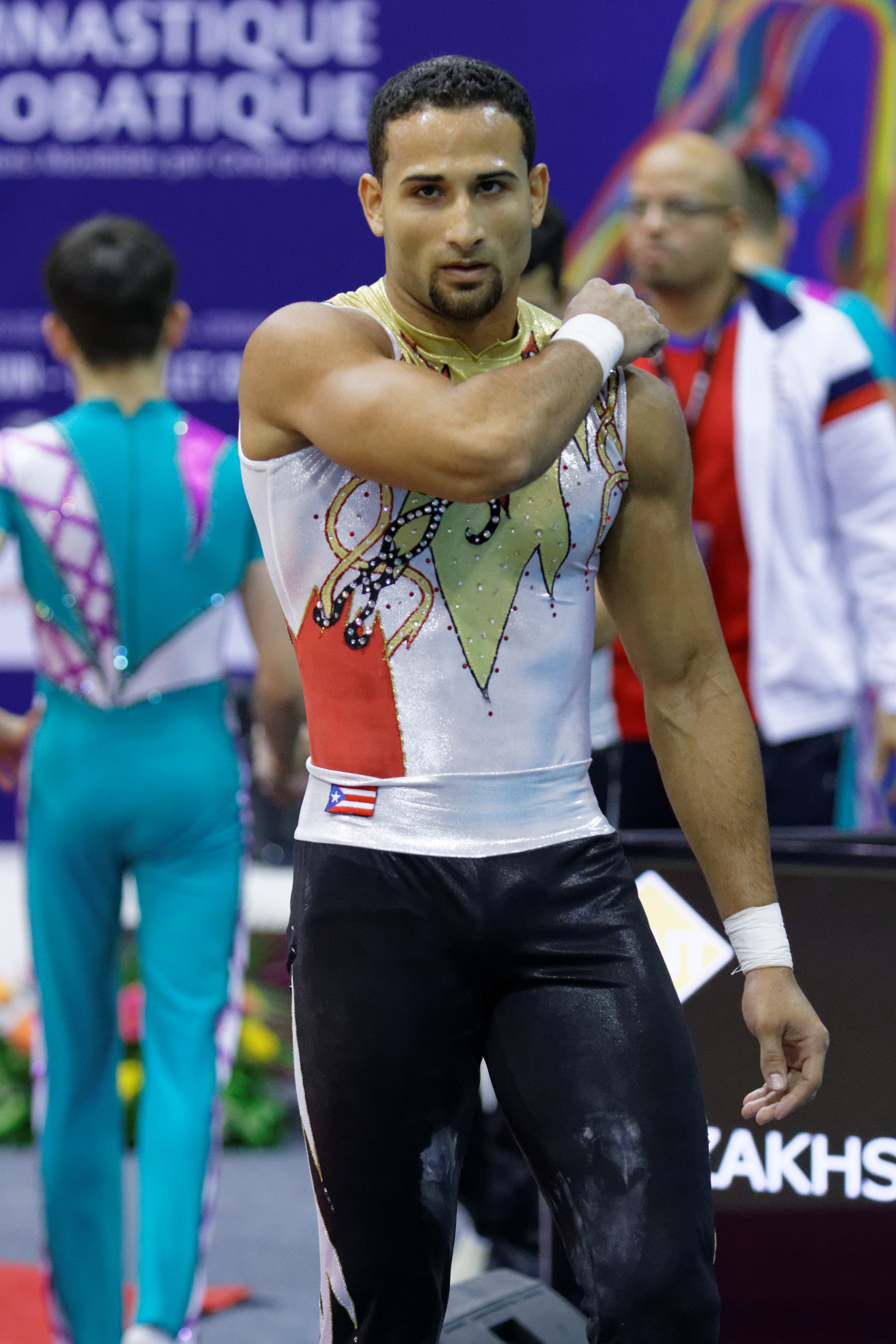
- Christian Morales at the 2014 Acrobatic Gymnastics World Championships

Personal information
- Born: January 14, 1988 (age 38) Bayamón, Puerto Rico

Gymnastics career
- Discipline: Acrobatic gymnastics
- Country represented: Puerto Rico

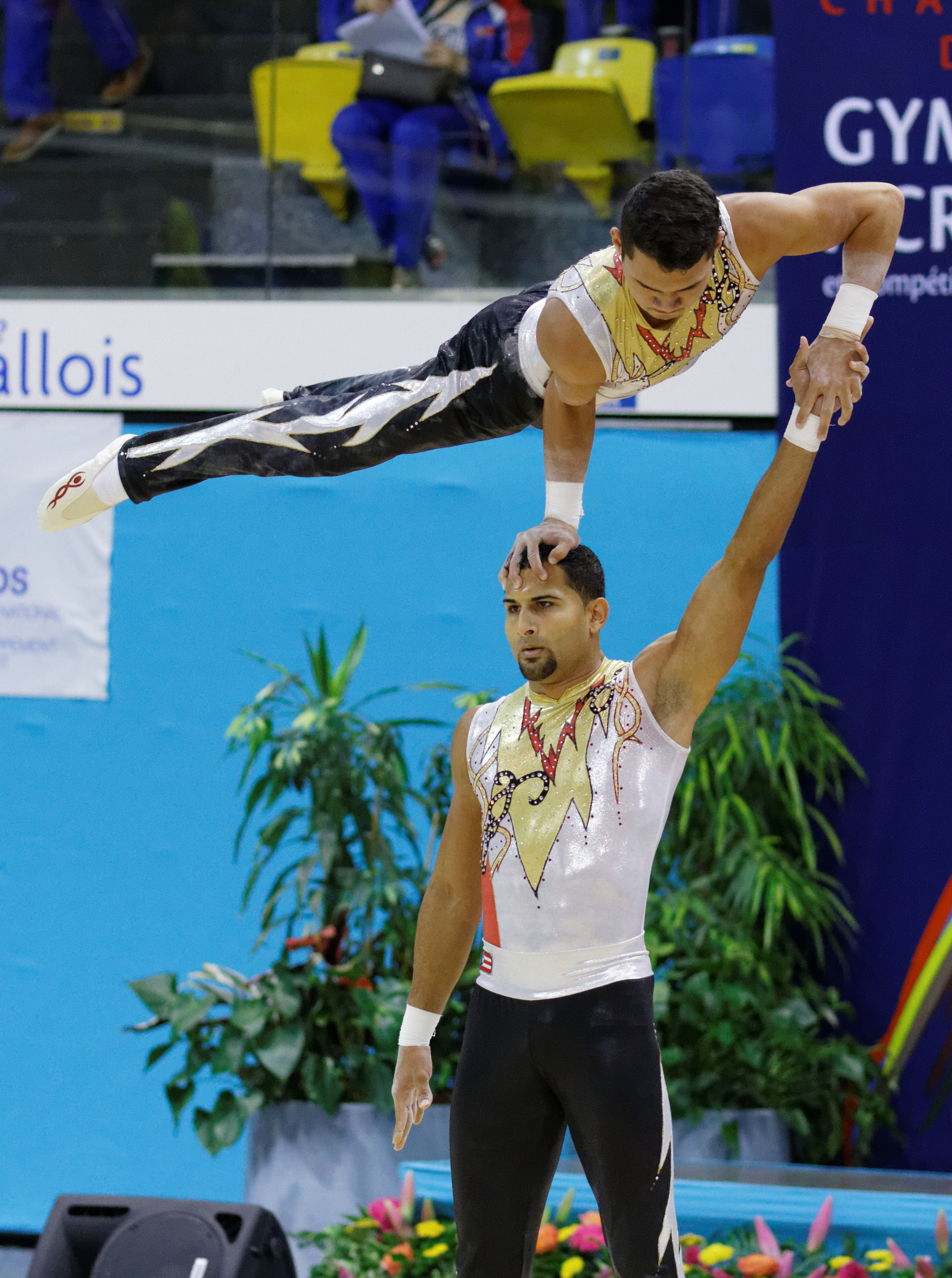
Christian Morales (bottom) and Kevin Garcia Maldonado at the 2014 Acrobatic Gymnastics World Championships.

Christian Morales (born January 14, 1988) is a Puerto Rican male acrobatic gymnast. Along with his partner, Kevin Garcia Maldonado, he competed in the 2014 Acrobatic Gymnastics World Championships.
