= Oskar Piotrowski (gymnast) =

Polish acrobatic gymnast

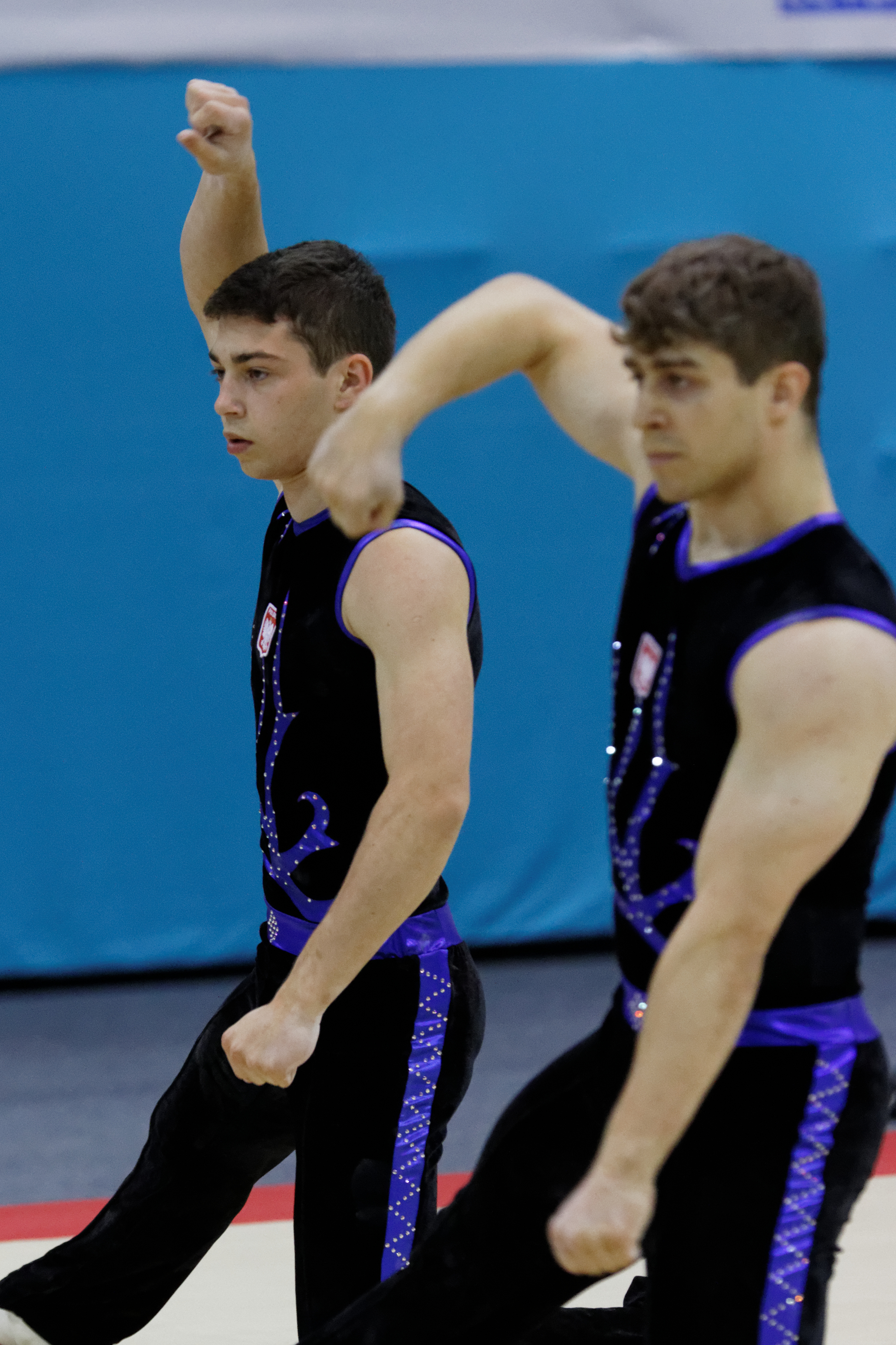
- Oskar Piotrowski at the 2014 Acrobatic Gymnastics World Championships

Personal information
- Born: 11 August 1996 (age 30)

Gymnastics career
- Discipline: Acrobatic gymnastics
- Country represented: Poland

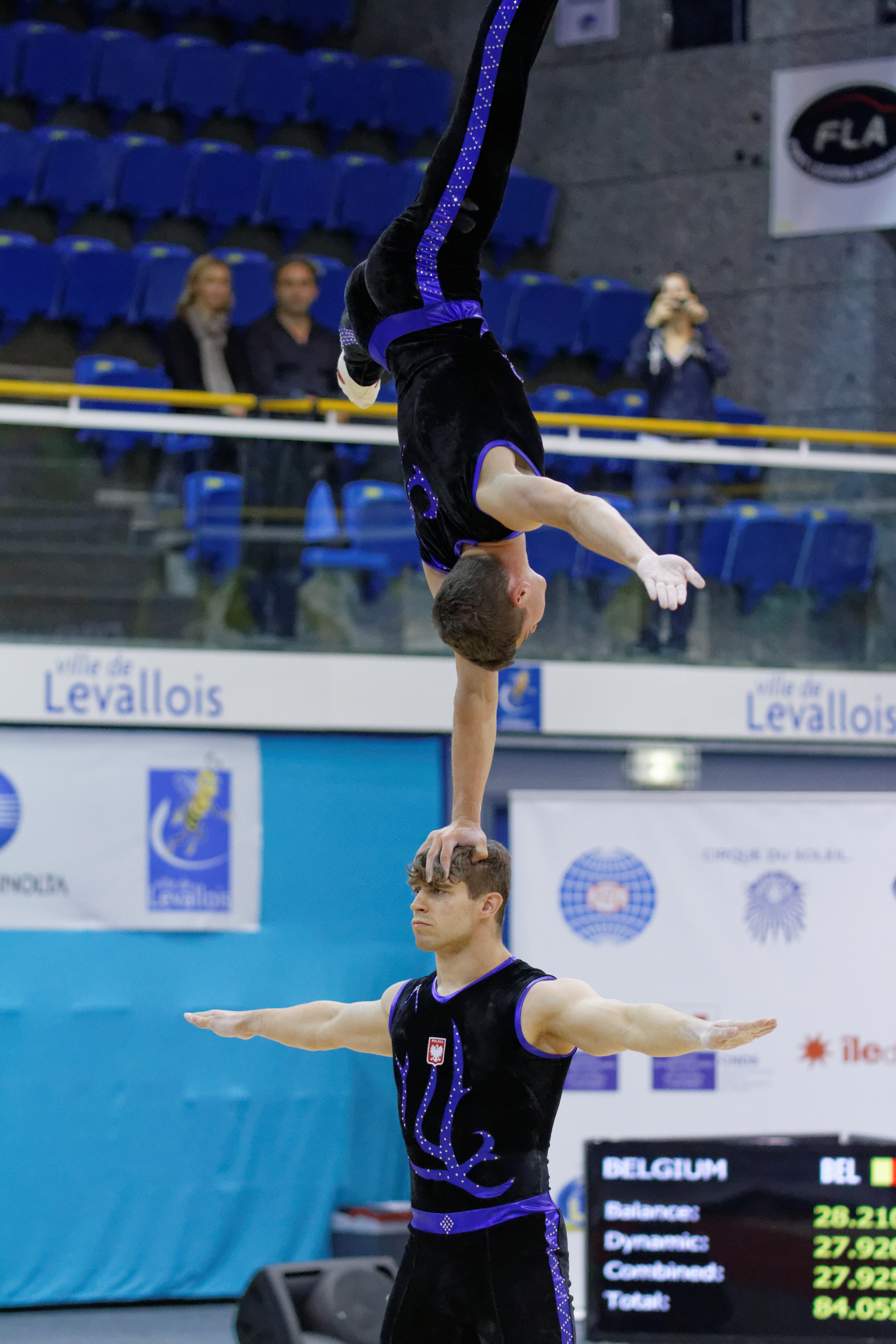
Oskar Piotrowski (top) and Adam Wojtacki at the 2014 Acrobatic Gymnastics World Championships.

Oskar Piotrowski (born 11 August 1996) is a Polish male acrobatic gymnast. Along with his partner, Adam Wojtacki, he competed in the 2014 Acrobatic Gymnastics World Championships.
