= 2015 Acrobatic Gymnastics European Championships =

27th Acrobatic Gymnastics European Championships
- Venue: Sachsen Arena
- Location: Riesa, Germany
- Start date: 23 September 2015
- End date: 5 October 2015

The 27th Acrobatic Gymnastics European Championships was held in Riesa, Germany from September 23 to October 5, 2015.

== Results ==
Event	Gold	Silver	Bronze
Women's Pair - Balance	Belarus	Russia	Belgium
Women's Pair - Dynamic	Russia	Belarus	Belgium
Women's Pair - All around	Russia	Belarus	Great Britain
Men's Pair - Balance	Russia	Belgium	Germany
Men's Pair - Dynamic	Russia	Belarus	Belgium
Men's Pair - All around	Belgium	Russia	Belarus
Mixed Pair - Balance	Russia	Great Britain	Belarus
Mixed Pair - Dynamic	Russia	Great Britain	Belarus
Mixed Pair - All around	Russia	Great Britain	Belarus
Women's Group - Balance	Belgium	Belarus	Russia
Women's Group - Dynamic	Russia	Belgium	Belarus
Women's Group - All around	Belgium	Russia	Belarus
Men's Group - Balance	Israel	Russia	Bulgaria
Men's Group - Dynamic	Israel	Russia	Belarus
Men's Group - All around	Israel	Russia	Bulgaria

=== Medal table ===
Rank	Nation	Gold	Silver	Bronze	Total
1	Russia	8	6	1	15
2	Belgium	3	2	3	8
3	Israel	3	0	0	3
4	Belarus	1	4	7	12
5	Great Britain	0	3	1	4
6	Bulgaria	0	0	2	2
7	Germany	0	0	1	1
Totals (7 entries)		15	15	15	45
