= 2016 Acrobatic Gymnastics World Championships =

25th Acrobatic Gymnastics World Championships
- Location: Putian, China
- Start date: 1 April 2016
- End date: 3 April 2016

The 2016 Acrobatic Gymnastics World Championships was the 25th edition of acrobatic gymnastics competition and were held in Putian, China from 1-3 April 2016.

== Medal summary ==
=== Medal table ===
* Host nation (China)

Rank	Nation	Gold	Silver	Bronze	Total
1	Russia	5	0	0	5
2	China	1	1	1	3
3	Belarus	0	2	1	3
4	Belgium	0	1	1	2
5	Israel	0	1	0	1
5	United States	0	1	0	1
7	Great Britain	0	0	2	2
8	North Korea	0	0	1	1
Totals (8 entries)		6	6	6	18

=== Results ===
Event	Gold	Silver	Bronze
Team	Russia	Belarus	China
Men's Pair	Russia; Igor Mishev; Nikolay Suprunov	Belgium; Vincent Casse; Arne van Gelder	North Korea; Kim Un Hak; Ri Chol Jun
Women's Pair	Russia; Daria Guryeva; Daria Kalinina	Belarus; Marharyta Bartashevich; Viktoryia Mikhnovich	Belgium; Laurie Philpott; Natascha van Es
Mixed Pair	Russia; Georgy Pataraya; Marina Chernova	United States; Axl Osborne; Tiffani Williams	United Kingdom; Lewis Walker; Isabella Montagna
Women's Group	Russia; Valeria Belkina; Yulia Nikitina; Zhanna Parkhomets	China; Li Run; Xia Zhimeng; Yang Xiaoyi	Belarus; Katsiaryna Barysevich; Veranika Nabokina; Karina Sandovich
Men's Group	China; Li Zheng; Rui Liuming; Zhang Teng; Zhou Jiahuai	Israel; Lidar Dana; Yannay Kalfa; Efi Efrain Sach; Daniel Uralevitch	United Kingdom; Conor Sawenko; Charlie Tate; Adam Upcott; Lewis Watts
