= Vincent Casse =

Belgian acrobatic gymnast (born 1994)

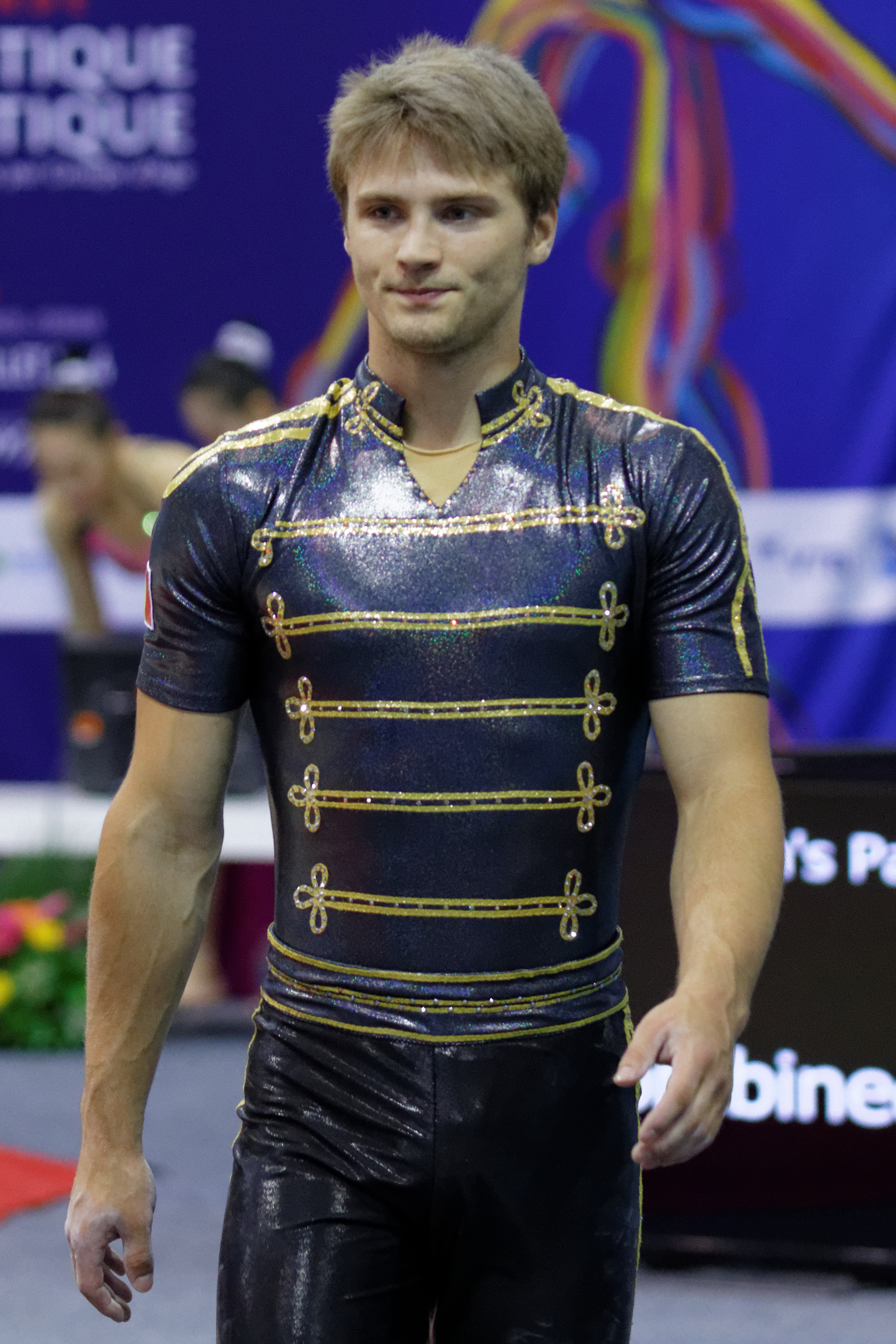
- Vincent Casse at the 2014 Acrobatic Gymnastics World Championships

Personal information
- Born: 21 December 1994 (age 31)

Gymnastics career
- Discipline: Acrobatic gymnastics
- Country represented: Belgium
- Club: Voor Geest en Lichaam Niel

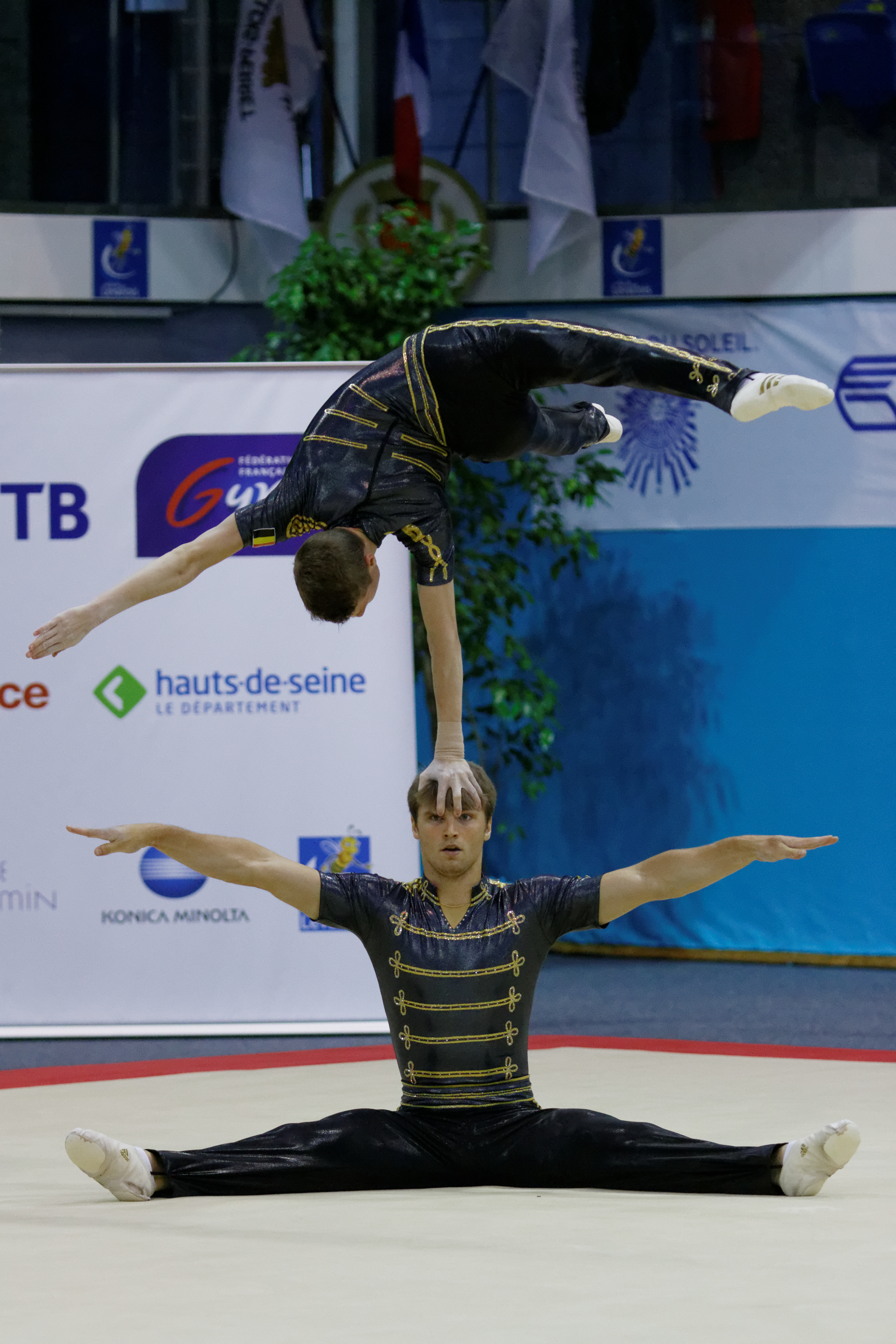
Vincent Casse (down) and Arne Van Gelder at the 2014 Acrobatic Gymnastics World Championships.

Vincent Casse (born 21 December 1994) is a Belgian male acrobatic gymnast. Along with his partner, Arne Van Gelder, he finished 4th in the 2014 Acrobatic Gymnastics World Championships.
