= 2020 Acrobatic Gymnastics World Championships =

27th Acrobatic Gymnastics World Championships
- Venue: Patinoire des Vernets
- Location: Geneva, Switzerland
- Start date: 2 July 2021
- End date: 4 July 2021

The 2020 Acrobatic Gymnastics World Championships was the 27th edition of acrobatic gymnastics competition. It was originally scheduled to take place in Geneva, Switzerland from 29 May to 31 May 2020. However, due to the COVID-19 pandemic it was postponed and took place from 2 July to 4 July 2021.

== Medal summary ==
=== Medal table ===
Rank	Nation	Gold	Silver	Bronze	Total
1	RGF	5	0	1	6
2	Portugal	1	0	1	2
3	Belgium	0	3	0	3
4	Germany	0	1	0	1
4	Israel	0	1	0	1
4	United States	0	1	0	1
7	Ukraine	0	0	2	2
8	Belarus	0	0	1	1
8	Kazakhstan	0	0	1	1
Totals (9 entries)		6	6	6	18

=== Results ===
Event	Gold	Silver	Bronze
Team Ranking	RGF	Belgium	Kazakhstan
Men's Pair	RGF; Timofei Ivanov; Maksim Karavaev	Belgium; Robin Casse; Noam Patel	Belarus; Maksim Markevich; Aleh Mikhalevich
Women's Pair	Portugal; Rita Ferreira; Ana Teixeira	United States; Emily Davis; Aubrey Rosilier	RGF; Diana Korotaeva; Amina Omari
Mixed Pair	RGF; Kirill Startsev; Victoria Aksenova	Germany; Daniel Blintsov; Pia Schütze	Ukraine; Ivan Labunets; Anita Pyrlyk
Women's Group	RGF; Daria Chebulanka; Sofia Polishchuk; Daria Tikhomirova	Belgium; Kim Bergmans; Lise De Meyst; Bo Hollebosch	Portugal; Bárbara da Silva Sequeira; Francisca Maia; Francisca Sampaio Maia
Men's Group	RGF; Viktor Grechukhin; Bogdan Makeev; Vadim Nabiev; Dmitrii Slabukha	Israel; Hen Banuz; Lior Borodin; Amir Daus; Tomer Offir	Ukraine; Stanislav Kukurudz; Yurii Push; Yuriy Savka; Taras Yarush
