= Lewis Watts =

American photographer, archivist, curator, art historian, educator (b. 1946)

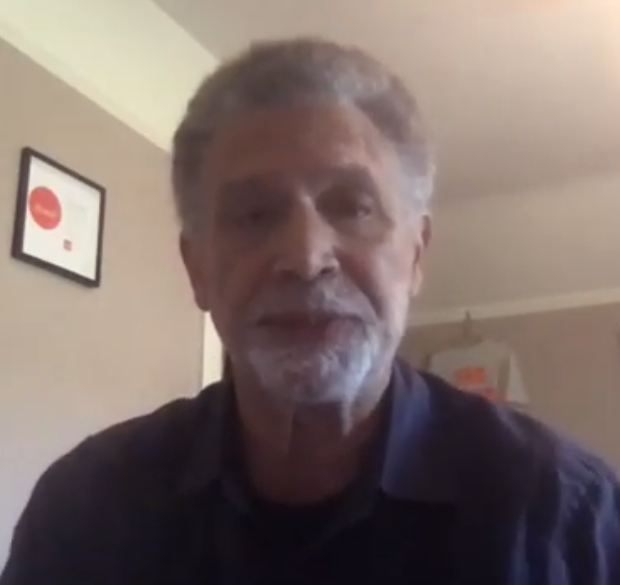
- Giving an online presentation in 2020
- Born: 1946 (age 79–80); Little Rock, Arkansas, U.S.
- Education: University of California, Berkeley
- Occupations: Photographer, archivist curator, author, educator

Lewis Watts (born 1946) is an American photographer, archivist curator, art historian, author, lecturer, and educator. He is a Professor Emeritus of Art at the University of California, Santa Cruz (U.C. Santa Cruz).

== Career ==
Lewis Watts was born in 1946 in Little Rock, Arkansas. He has a BA degree in political science, as well as a MA degree in photography and design from University of California, Berkeley (U.C. Berkeley). He had taught at the University of California, Santa Cruz and the University of California, Berkeley, as well as other institutions for over 40 years.

His work is inspired by his historical and contemporary interests and representation of people in the African diaspora.

Watts work has been exhibited at and has collections at the San Francisco Museum of Modern Art, the Cité de la Musique (Paris, France), the Ogden Museum of Southern Art (New Orleans, Louisiana), the Oakland Museum of California, the Neuberger Museum of Art (Purchase, New York), the Amistad Center for Art and Culture (Hartford, Connecticut), Light Work (Syracuse, New York).

== Exhibitions ==
- 1998–1999 – Urban Foot Prints: The Photography of Lewis Watts, Oakland Museum of California, Oakland, California
- 1999 – Lewis Watts, South to West Oakland, Robert B. Menschel Photography Gallery, Syracuse University, Syracuse, New York
- 1999 – Lifework Exhibit, Falkirk Cultural Center, San Rafael, California
- 1999 – Photography of Lewis Watts, Hampshire College, Amherst, Massachusetts
- 2015–2017 – New Orleans, Photographs by Lewis Watts, Richmond Art Center, Richmond, California
- 2016 – FRANCAIS, Photographs by Lewis Watts, San Francisco Museum of Modern Art, San Francisco, California
- 2017 – Mining the Archive, Rena Bransten Gallery, Minnesota Street Project, San Francisco, California
- 2017 – Work from the Collection, Lewis Watts, Amistad Center of Art and Culture, Hartford, Connecticut

== Publications ==
- Watts, Lewis; Porter, Eric (2013). New Orleans Suite: Music and Culture in Transition. Berkeley, California: University of California Press. ISBN 9780520273870.
- Pepin Silva, Elizabeth; Watts, Lewis (2017). Harlem of the West: The San Francisco Fillmore Jazz Era. On The Water Front. ISBN 9780998670409.

== Filmography ==
- 1999 – Neighborhoods: The Hidden Cities of San Francisco (advisor)
- 2014 – Through a Lens Darkly: Black Photographers and the Emergence of a People (Documentary)
- 2015 – Dogtown Redemption (Documentary) (advisor)
- 2016 – Independent Lens (TV series, documentary advisor for 1 episode)
