= Acrobatic Gymnastics European Championships =

- Status: active
- Genre: sporting event
- Date: mid-year
- Frequency: biennial
- Country: varying
- Inaugurated: 1978 / 1996 / 2005

The Acrobatic Gymnastics European Championships are the main acrobatic gymnastics championships in Europe. The championships are organized by European Gymnastics, formerly known as the European Union of Gymnastics (French: Union Européenne de Gymnastique or UEG).

== Timeline ==
- Creation of the International Federation of Sports Acrobatics (IFSA) = 1973
- Olympic recognition by the International Olympic Committee (IOC) = 1985
- Creation of the European Sports Acrobatics Federation (EUROSAF) = 1993
- Merger IFSA with Fédération Internationale de Gymnastique (FIG) = 1999

== Championships ==
Seniors in 1980, 1982, 1984, 1986, 1988, 1990, 1992, 1995 and 1996 was held alongside Acrobatic Gymnastics World Championships, also 1989 alongside 7th Acrobatic Gymnastics World Cup.

=== Seniors ===
Edition	Year	Host city	Host country	Events
Organized by International Federation of Sports Acrobatics (IFSA)
1	1978	Riga	Soviet Union	
2	1979	Szeged	Hungary	
3	1980	Poznań	Poland	
4	1982	London	United Kingdom	
5	1984	Sofia	Bulgaria	
6	1985	Augsburg	West Germany	
7	1986	Rennes	France	
8	1987	Wrocław	Poland	
9	1988	Antwerp	Belgium	
10	1989	Riga	Soviet Union	
11	1990	Augsburg	West Germany	
12	1991	Lisbon	Portugal	
13	1992	Rennes	France	
14	1993	Antwerp	Belgium	
Organized by European Sports Acrobatics Federation (EUROSAF)
15	1994	Zielona Góra	Poland	
16	1995	Wrocław	Poland	
17	1996	Riesa	Germany	
18	1997	Baunatal	Germany	
19	1999	Zielona Góra	Poland	
Organized by European Union of Gymnastics (UEG)
20	2001	Faro	Portugal	
21	2003	Zielona Góra	Poland	
22	2005	Thessaloníki	Greece	
23	2007	Den Bosch	Netherlands	
24	2009	Vila do Conde	Portugal	
25	2011	Varna	Bulgaria	
26	2013	Odivelas	Portugal	15
27	2015	Riesa	Germany	15
28	2017	Rzeszów	Poland	15
29	2019	Holon	Israel	15
30	2021	Pesaro	Italy	15
31	2023	Varna	Bulgaria	15
32	2025	Luxembourg	Luxembourg	15

=== Teams (Juniors and Seniors) ===
Edition	Year	Host city	Host country	Events
Organized by European Union of Gymnastics (UEG)
1	2006	Zielona Góra	Poland	
2	2010	Rzeszów	Poland	

=== Juniors ===
Edition	Year	Host city	Host country	Events
Organized by European Sports Acrobatics Federation (EUROSAF)
1	1996	Zielona Góra	Poland	
2	1998	Sonderborg	Denmark	
Organized by European Union of Gymnastics (UEG)
3	2000	Winterthur	Switzerland	
4	2002	Deinze	Belgium	
5	2003	Zielona Góra	Poland	
6	2005	Thessaloniki	Greece	
7	2007	's-Hertogenbosch	Netherlands	
8	2009	Vila do Conde	Portugal	
9	2011	Varna	Bulgaria	
10	2013	Odivelas	Portugal	
11	2015	Riesa	Germany	15
12	2017	Rzeszów	Poland	15
13	2019	Holon	Israel	15

=== Age Groups ===
Edition	Year	Host city	Host country	Events
Organized by European Union of Gymnastics (UEG)
1	2005	Thessaloniki	Greece	
2	2006	Zielona Góra	Poland	
3	2007	's-Hertogenbosch	Netherlands	
4	2009	Vila do Conde	Portugal	
5	2010	Rzeszów	Poland	
6	2011	Varna	Bulgaria	
7	2013	Odivelas	Portugal	
8	2015	Riesa	Germany	
9	2017	Rzeszów	Poland	
10	2019	Holon	Israel	

== Results ==
- https://web.archive.org/web/20111029054705/http://sports123.com/acr/index.html
- https://www.sportsacrobatics.info/archive.htm
- https://www.sportsacrobatics.info/stats/index.htm

== See also ==
- Acrobatic Gymnastics World Championships
