= Acrobatic gymnastics =

Competitive gymnastic discipline

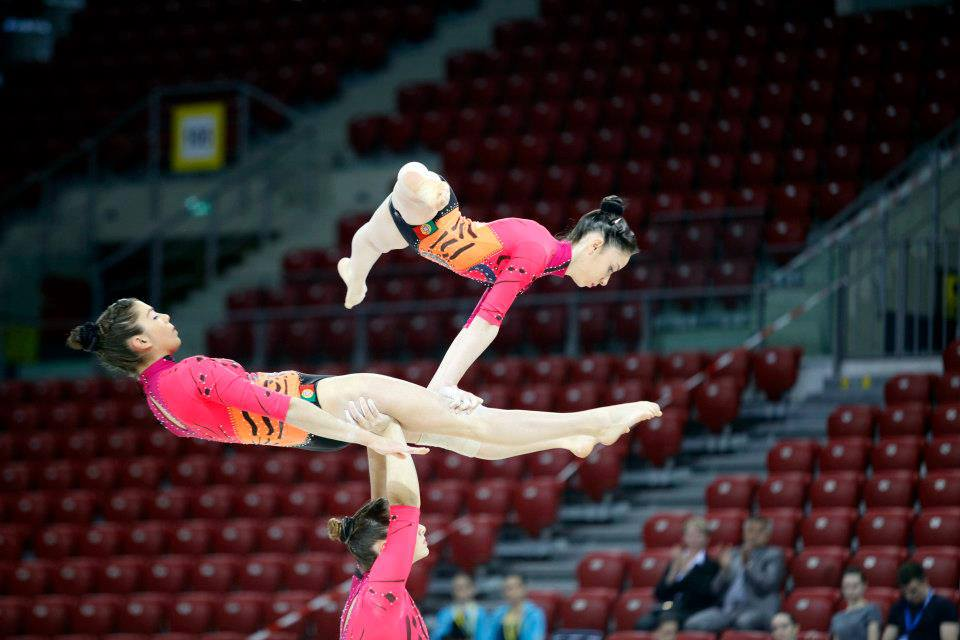
- Women's trio
- Highest governing body: World Gymnastics
- First contested: Soviet Union, 1930s

Characteristics
- Contact: Not with opponents
- Mixed-sex: No (except mixed pairs)
- Type: Gymnastics sport

Presence
- Country or region: Worldwide
- Olympic: No
- World Games: 1993 – 2021

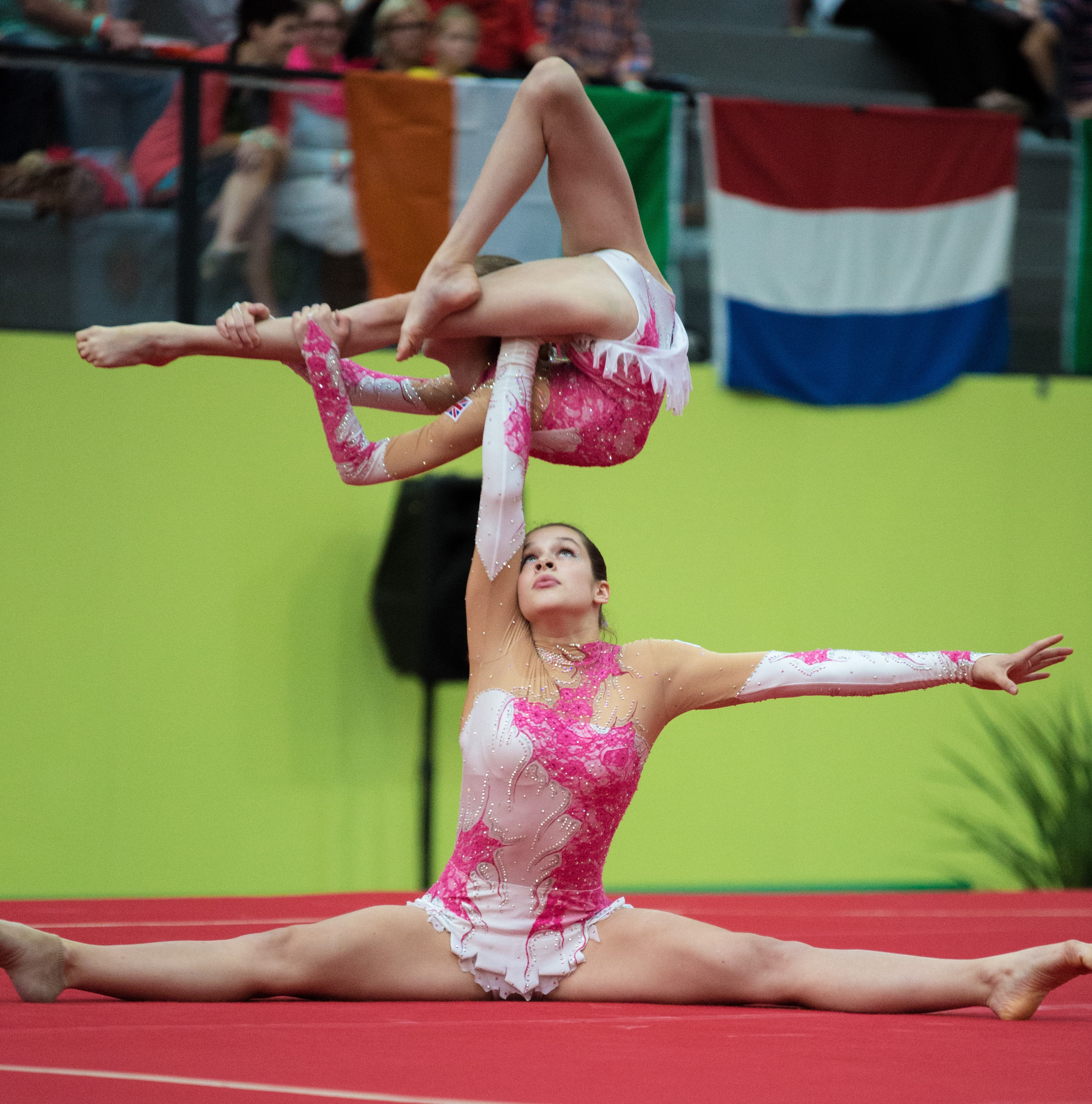
Women's pair

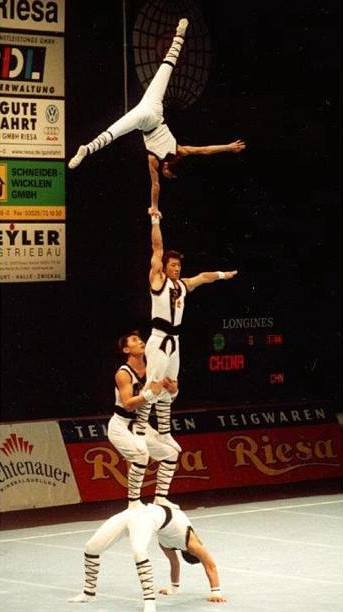
Men's four

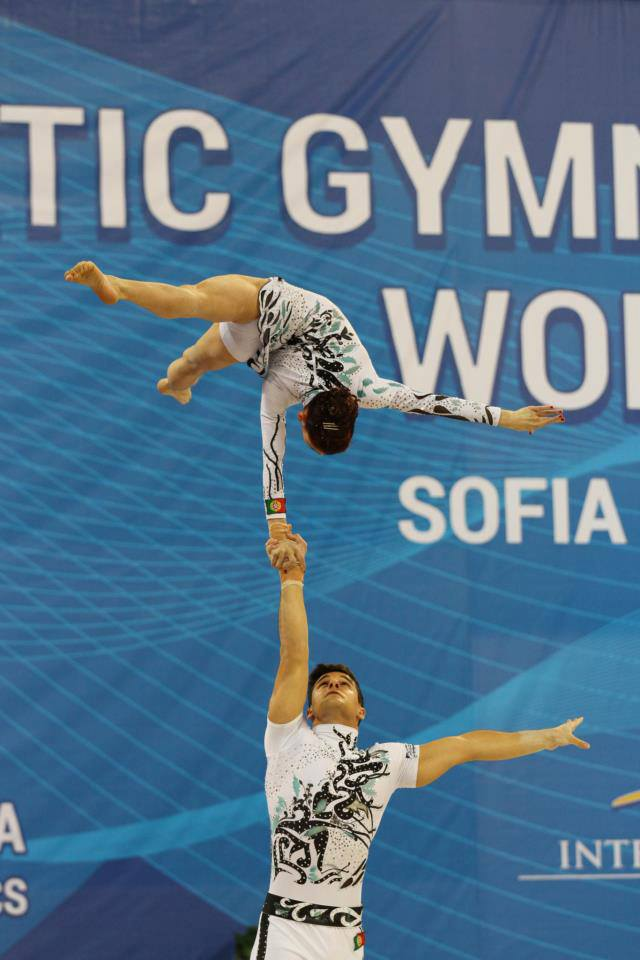
Mixed pair in one-arm flag

Acrobatic gymnastics is a competitive discipline of gymnastics where partnerships of gymnasts work together and perform routines consisting of acrobatic skills, dance and tumbling, set to music. The sport is governed by World Gymnastics. There are three types of routines: a 'balance' routine, where the focus is on strength, poise and flexibility; a 'dynamic' routine, which includes throws, somersaults and catches, and a 'combined' routine which includes elements from both balance and dynamic.

Acrobatic gymnasts perform in one of five units: pairs (same-gender or mixed) or same-gender groups (three for women, four for men). In each partnership, the gymnasts' different sizes and abilities will be balanced to complement each other in order to carry out the complex moves. Some will mainly carry out supporting and pitching roles and are known as bases. They are then balanced with usually smaller gymnasts who become the 'tops'. In men's and women's groups there are also one or two 'middles', who are like another base who usually will support the top while balancing on the base.

In competition, partnerships perform a routine to music, which has usually been choreographed specifically for them. The gymnasts carry out their acrobatic moves and combine them with dance, all in time to and in keeping with the style of the music. Partnerships are judged on artistry/dance, execution of skills, and difficulty of skills, with the scoring emphasis on execution.

The rules for the sport, known as the Code of Points, are governed by the FIG. These rules are subject to change every four years in line with the Olympic cycle, as in other disciplines of gymnastics.

== History ==
Acrobatics have a long history dating back thousands of years across the world and appeared in festivals, early circuses, and later vaudeville acts as a form of entertainment. The first use of acrobatics as a specific sport was in the Soviet Union in the 1930s, though its development was interrupted by the World War II. The first competition, for men only, was held in 1939, with a women's event being added the next year.

In 1957, the first international competition was held between the Soviet Union, Poland, Bulgaria, and East Germany. The International Federation of Sports Acrobatics was established in 1973, and the first world championships were held in 1974. The federation dissolved in 1998, and acrobatic gymnastics was from then on governed by the FIG. It was originally called sports acrobatics but has been known as acrobatic gymnastics since 2007.

In addition to the current five categories, two additional categories for tumbling (men's and women's) were included until the 1999 World Championships, though some groups still involve tumbling events.

In the United States, the first national sports acrobatics organization was called the United States Sports Acrobatics Federation (USSAF). Founded in 1975, its name was changed to the United States Sports Acrobatics (USSA) in the 1990s. The USSA then merged with USA Gymnastics in 2002, and acrobatic gymnastics is now a discipline therein.

== Competitions ==
Acrobatic gymnastics is part of the World Games, and it is also included in the European Games as well as having a dedicated Acrobatic Gymnastics World Championships held in even numbered years (known as World Sports Acrobatics Championships prior to 2006), and continental or region championships in odd numbered years. For example, the 28th Acrobatic Gymnastics European Championships were held in Rzeszów, Poland, in October 2017.

There are also numerous national, state, and regional competitions that are held in each country. Local and regional competitions often form the qualification stages required to compete at national championships. There is no requirement from the FIG for gymnasts to have qualified through their own national championships to compete internationally, but local governing bodies will often make their national team selections based on performance at national competition.

At the London 2012 Olympics, acrobatic partnerships were seen performing before the Olympic gymnastics' events, and during the opening and closing ceremonies.

Gold, silver, and bronze medals are generally awarded in the usual fashion, although in some competitions, a minimum score is required to qualify for medals.

The FIG defines four age groups for competitions, with gymnasts in the younger age categories performing more limited routines than those in older ones:

- Pre-Youth (11–16 years old) – the FIG does not organize Pre-Youth competitions, but continental or national gymnastics organizations may do so to encourage the development of acrobatic gymnastics
- Youth (12–18)
- Juniors (13–19)
- Seniors (15 years or older)

Gymnasts may only participate in one level and unit (pair or group) at a competition.

== Routines ==
The number of required routines at a competition depends on the level at which the gymnasts are competing. At the junior and senior levels, all three routines mentioned below are required. At lower age levels, only a single simpler routine is required. Each of the routine types has a different emphasis, but all include tumbling and dance as elements. The different routine types are as follows:

1. Balance (formerly known as Static) – A balance routine requires that certain poses or 'balances' and must be held static for a specific duration. These moves require strength, poise, elegance and flexibility. Gymnasts will combine into towers, or pyramids with the tops holding a particular position balanced on their bases. Traditionally, balance routines were often performed to slower music, but not exclusively so. Balance routines last approximately two minutes and forty seconds.
2. Dynamic (formerly known as Tempo) – These routines demonstrate power, strength and grace through the performance of acrobatic moves that involve the phases of spring, flight, rotation, and landing. This often involves the base, or bases in the partnership propelling the top through the air and through a series of somersaults or twists. The top is generally caught or supported in the landing by their base(s). Dynamic routines last approximately two minutes.
3. Combined – At the more senior levels of competition (11–19 through senior levels), a third routine must be performed that combines both balance and dynamic moves, along with the usual tumbling and dance (tumbling is not required from senior level athletes). Typically, it is performed as a final's routine, with a duration, depending upon the level of competition, of approximately 2 minutes and 30 seconds.

As in artistic gymnastics, compulsory routines, consisting of a prescribed sequence of elements, were previously required along with optional routines, consisting of elements chosen by the gymnasts and their coaches, although this is no longer the case at the highest level of the sport.

== Scoring ==
=== Code of Points ===
The final score of a routine is the sum of the difficulty, execution, and artistry scores, minus any additional penalties incurred. For seniors, the difficulty score is open-ended with no maximum, while the execution and artistry scores have a starting value of 10 points and are lowered for specific mistakes made by the gymnasts. Emphasis is put on the execution score, which is doubled to provide the final score.

==== Difficulty ====
Difficulty is the sum of the difficulty value assigned to each element the gymnasts perform during an exercise. Senior gymnasts have no difficulty limit. Gymnasts submit a 'tariff sheet' listing their planned elements ahead of the competition.

==== Execution ====
Execution is the degree to which the gymnasts performs an element with aesthetic and technical perfection. Execution penalties are subtracted from the starting score of 10 and concern aspects such as the amplitude of flight elements, correctness of body shapes, and controlled landings. Penalties range from 0.1 for small mistakes, such as a small bend at the waist in a handstand, to 0.5 for large ones. A top falling rather than being caught by a partner is a one-point deduction.

==== Artistry ====
Artistry evaluates the relationship of the gymnasts with each other and the music, the choreography of the routine, and the variety displayed in a routine. The choreography of the routine use the whole floor and flow logically from one element to the next, gymnasts should display emotion throughout the performance and perform well with each other, and the choreography should show creativity and original elements.

==== Penalties ====
Penalties are deducted from the final score. Penalties include too large height differences (30 centimetres (12 in) or larger) between both gymnasts in a pair or between any gymnast and the next tallest one in a group, gymnasts leaving the floor boundary or going over the exercise time limit, balance elements not being held for long enough, or elements being performed out of the declared order.

=== History of the code of points ===
In 1978, each element was evaluated as either a Group 1 element or Group 2 element, with Group 1 elements being worth 0.4 difficulty points and Group 2 elements being worth 0.2. A routine required at least five elements, at least three of which were required to be Group 2 elements. The minimum difficulty level started a routine at 9.0 points, with the maximum being 10.0.

For the 2025–2028 code, changes were made to encourage variety and allow for mixed series of balance and dynamic elements while keeping the code relatively stable for the benefit of countries where acrobatic gymnastics is still developing.

== Judging ==
The judging panels of acrobatic gymnastics are similar to other disciplines of gymnastics where different panels of judges are overseen by a head judge, and each panel has a 'Chair of the Judging Panel' (CJP) who oversees that panel's activities. In acrobatic gymnastics, there are then difficulty judges (DJ) who only assess the difficulty of the elements in the routines; artistic judges (AJ) who only assess the performance and artistic merits of the routine; and execution judges (EJ) who only judge what points should be deducted based on imperfect execution of individual elements in the routine.

== Safety ==
Gymnasts train new elements with plenty of safety mats as well as safety harnesses, which are also called spotting belts. Gymnasiums must have a high ceiling to make sure gymnasts at the top of pyramids or being thrown high in the air do not hit the ceiling. To support a grip on the head, bases will often keep their hair short or shave the area gripped by a top, and they may use chalk to assist the top's grip.

Most acrobatic gymnastics injuries occur in the lower limbs, such as to the knee and ankle, with wrist injuries also being relatively frequent. Ligament injuries are common, though one study found a sex difference, with female gymnasts most frequently having ligament injuries while male gymnasts were most likely to have tendon injuries. Bases are more frequently injured than tops, and tops are more prone to acute injuries such as fractures or sprains, while bases are more prone to overuse injuries.

As in other gymnastics disciplines, disordered eating is a concern, although it is not well-studied in acrobatic gymnastics in particular. One study surveyed female gymnasts aged 10–19 participating in a World Cup event for indicators of disordered eating; they found that older gymnasts, gymnasts acting as bases, and gymnasts from Eastern Europe were at higher risk of disordered eating behaviors.

== See also ==
- Acrobalance
- Acrobatics
- Acroyoga
- Aerobic gymnastics
- Castell
- Human pyramid
- Human tower (gymnastic formation)
