= 2014 Acrobatic Gymnastics World Championships – Mixed pairs qualification =

The 24th World Acrobatic Gymnastics Championships were held in Levallois-Perret, France at the Palais des Sports Marcel-Cerdan. The mixed pairs qualifications were held on 10, 11 and 12 July 2014.

Event Results

Position	Team	Balance	Dynamic	Combined	Total	Qual.
1	Russia; Revaz Gurgenidze; Marina Chernova	29.310	29.200	29.410	87.920	Q
2	United Kingdom; Dominic Smith; Alice Upcott	29.010	28.825	29.645	87.480	Q
3	Belgium; Solano Cassamajor; Yana Vastavel	28.390	28.730	28.990	86.110	Q
4	United States; Ryan Ward; Kiley Boynton	28.730	27.800	28.835	85.365	Q
5	France; Alexis Martin; Camille Curti	27.205	28.050	27.375	82.630	Q
6	Belarus; Viktar Lebedzeu; Iryna Kuska	26.910	27.765	27.265	81.940	Q
7	Ukraine; Oleksandr Shpyn; Yelyzaveta Vasylyga	26.265	27.900	27.750	81.915	Q
8	United States; Brian Kincher; Eirian Smith	27.730	26.000	28.060	81.790	-
9	China; Shen Yunyun; Wu Wenhui	28.210	26.540	26.975	81.725	Q
10	Belarus; Artur Beliakou; Aliona Dubinina	26.600	27.860	25.315	79.775	-
11	Portugal; Alfredo Perreira; Mariana Gradim Alves Amorim	26.550	26.880	24.990	78.420	R
12	Germany; Nikolai Rein; Sophie Bruehmann	25.190	25.180	23.160	73.530	R
13	Poland; Jakub Tronina; Iga Klesyk	22.350	25.220	22.800	70.370	-
14	Brazil; Gabriel Ferreira Ioshida; Juliana Dos Reis de Freitas	21.940	24.050	21.640	67.630	-
15	Brazil; Fabrício Carvalho de Abreu; Yasmin Menezes	22.560	22.230	19.570	64.360	-
