= 2013 Acrobatic Gymnastics European Championships =

26th Acrobatic Gymnastics European Championships
- Venue: Multiusos de Odivelas
- Location: Odivelas, Portugal
- Start date: 16 October 2013
- End date: 28 October 2013
- Nations: 12 members of the European Union of Gymnastics

The 26th Acrobatic Gymnastics European Championships was held in Odivelas, Portugal 16–28 October 2013.

== Participating nations ==
- Belgium
- Belarus
- Bulgaria
- France
- Great Britain
- Ireland
- Israel
- Netherlands
- Poland
- Portugal
- Russia
- Ukraine

== Results ==
Event	Gold	Silver	Bronze
Women's Pair - Balance	Belgium; Eline Smedt; Nikki Snel	Great Britain; Danielle Jones; Shanie-redd Thorne	Russia; Elizaveta Dubrovina; Valentina Kim
Women's Pair - Dynamic	Russia; Ekaterina Mishchenko; Ksenia Sidelnikova	Belarus; Marharyta Bartashevich; Viktoryia Mikhnovich	Great Britain; Danielle Jones; Shanie-redd Thorne
Women's Pair - All around	Great Britain; Danielle Jones; Shanie-redd Thorne	Belgium; Eline Smedt; Nikki Snel	Russia; Ekaterina Mishchenko; Ksenia Sidelnikova
Men's Pair - Balance	Russia; Alexey Dudchenko; Konstantin Pilipchuk	Great Britain; Alex Houston; Timothy Pritchard	Belarus; Yauheni Novikau; Ilya Rybinski
Men's Pair - Dynamic	Russia; Alexey Dudchenko; Konstantin Pilipchuk	Great Britain; Alex Houston; Timothy Pritchard	Belarus; Yauheni Novikau; Ilya Rybinski
Men's Pair - All around	Russia; Alexey Dudchenko; Konstantin Pilipchuk	Great Britain; Alex Houston; Timothy Pritchard	Belarus; Yauheni Novikau; Ilya Rybinski
Mixed Pair - Balance	Portugal; Leonor Oliveira; Gonçalo Roque	Russia; Marina Chernova; Revaz Gurgenidze	Great Britain; Dominic Smith; Alice Upcott
Mixed Pair - Dynamic	Great Britain; Eleanor Franks; Christopher Rogers	Portugal; Leonor Oliveira; Gonçalo Roque	Russia; Marina Chernova; Revaz Gurgenidze
Mixed Pair - All around	Great Britain; Dominic Smith; Alice Upcott	Russia; Marina Chernova; Revaz Gurgenidze	Portugal; Leonor Oliveira; Gonçalo Roque
Women's Group - Balance	Russia; Ekaterina Loginova; Aigul Shaikhutdinova; Ekaterina Stroynova	Portugal; Daniela Leal; Leonor Piqueiro; Bárbara Sequeira	Belarus; Yulia Khrypach; Hanna Kobyzeva; Julia Kovalenko
Women's Group - Dynamic	Russia; Ekaterina Loginova; Aigul Shaikhutdinova; Ekaterina Stroynova	Great Britain; Georgia Lancaster; Elise Matthews; Millie Spalding	Portugal; Daniela Leal; Leonor Piqueiro; Bárbara Sequeira
Women's Group - All around	Russia; Ekaterina Loginova; Aigul Shaikhutdinova; Ekaterina Stroynova	Great Britain; Georgia Lancaster; Elise Matthews; Millie Spalding	Portugal; Daniela Leal; Leonor Piqueiro; Bárbara Sequeira
Men's Group - Balance	Russia; Dmitry Bryzgalov; Valentin Chetverkin; Maxim Chulkov; Aleksandr Kurasov	Belarus; Artsiom Khvalko; Kiryl Shatau; Eduard Vauchetski; Kiryl Zhdanovich	Poland; Jakub Kosowicz; Wojciech Krysiak; Lukasz Misztela; Radoslaw Trojan
Men's Group - Dynamic	Russia; Dmitry Bryzgalov; Valentin Chetverkin; Maxim Chulkov; Aleksandr Kurasov	Ukraine; Victor Iaremchuk; Andrii Kozynko; Oleksiy Lesyk; Oleksandr Nelep	Belarus; Artsiom Khvalko; Kiryl Shatau; Eduard Vauchetski; Kiryl Zhdanovich
Men's Group - All around	Russia; Dmitry Bryzgalov; Valentin Chetverkin; Maxim Chulkov; Aleksandr Kurasov	Belarus; Artsiom Khvalko; Kiryl Shatau; Eduard Vauchetski; Kiryl Zhdanovich	Ukraine; Victor Iaremchuk; Andrii Kozynko; Oleksiy Lesyk; Oleksandr Nelep

=== Medal table ===
Rank	Nation	Gold	Silver	Bronze	Total
1	Russia	10	2	3	15
2	Great Britain	3	6	2	11
3	Portugal	1	2	3	6
4	Belgium	1	1	0	2
5	Belarus	0	3	5	8
6	Ukraine	0	1	1	2
7	Poland	0	0	1	1
Totals (7 entries)		15	15	15	45
