= Millie Spalding =

British acrobatic gymnast

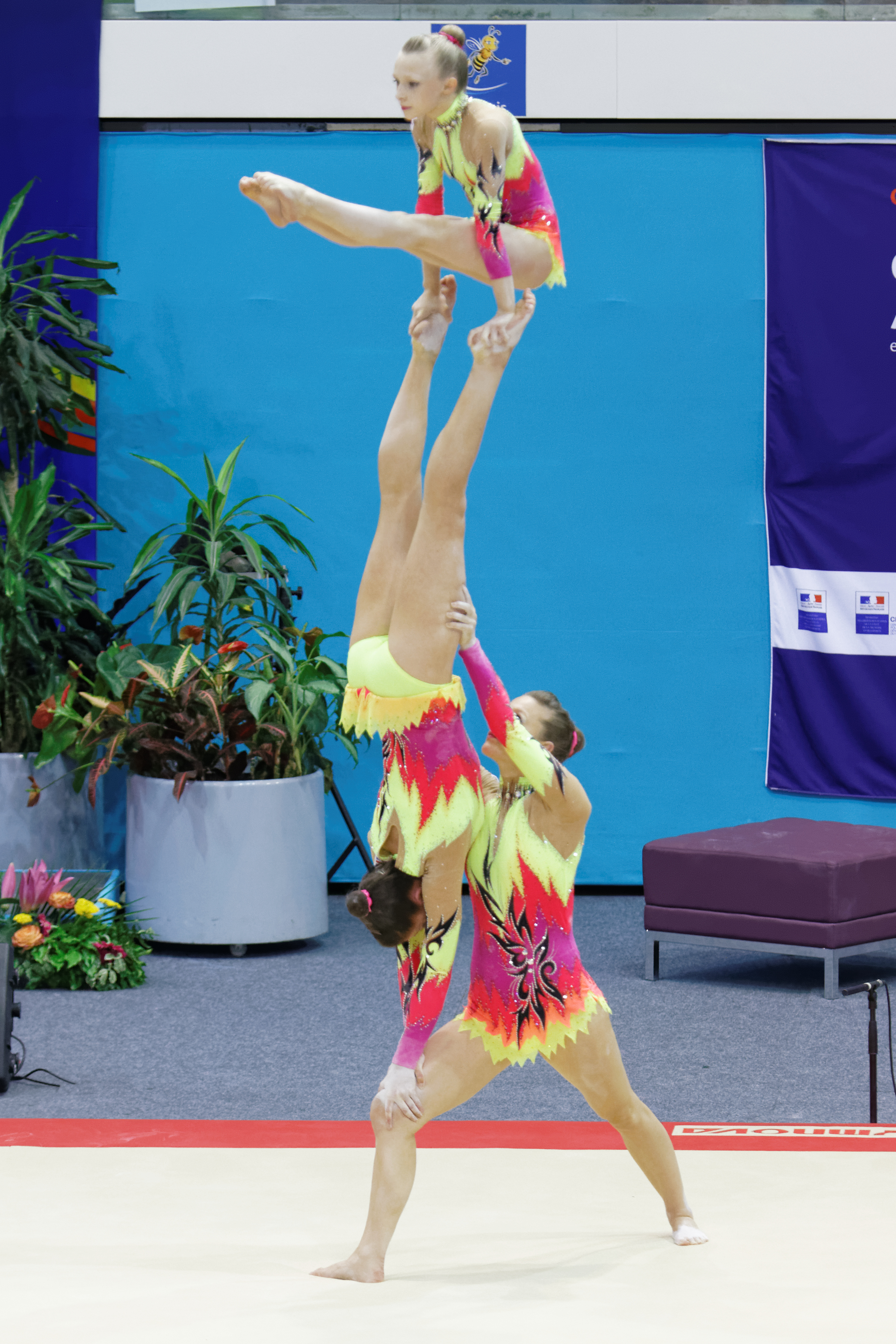

Personal information
- Born: 31 July 1998 (age 28)

Gymnastics career
- Discipline: Acrobatic gymnastics
- Country represented: Great Britain
Medal record
Women's acrobatic gymnastics
Representing Great Britain
World Championships
Gold medal – first place	2014 Levallois-Perret	Group
European Championships
Silver medal – second place	2013 Odivelas	Group - Dynamic
Silver medal – second place	2013 Odivelas	Group - All Around

Millie Spalding (born 31 July 1998) is a British female acrobatic gymnast. With partners Georgia Lancaster and Elise Matthews, Spalding achieved gold in the 2014 Acrobatic Gymnastics World Championships.
