= Brian Kincher =

American acrobatic gymnast

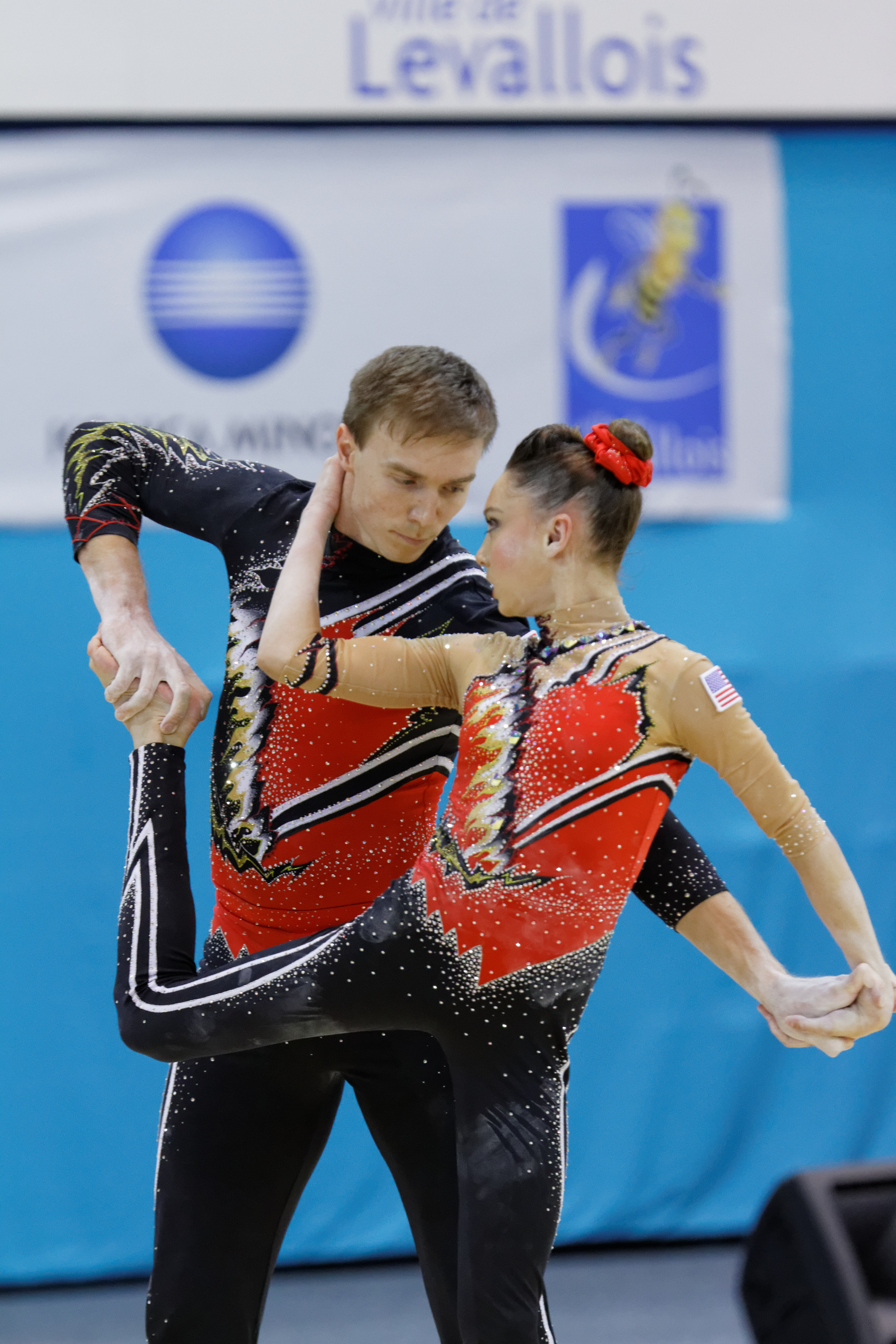
- Brian Kincher at the 2014 Acrobatic Gymnastics World Championships.

Personal information
- Born: August 16, 1986 (age 40)

Gymnastics career
- Discipline: Acrobatic gymnastics
- Country represented: United States
- Club: WestCoast Training Center
- Head coach: Marie Annonson

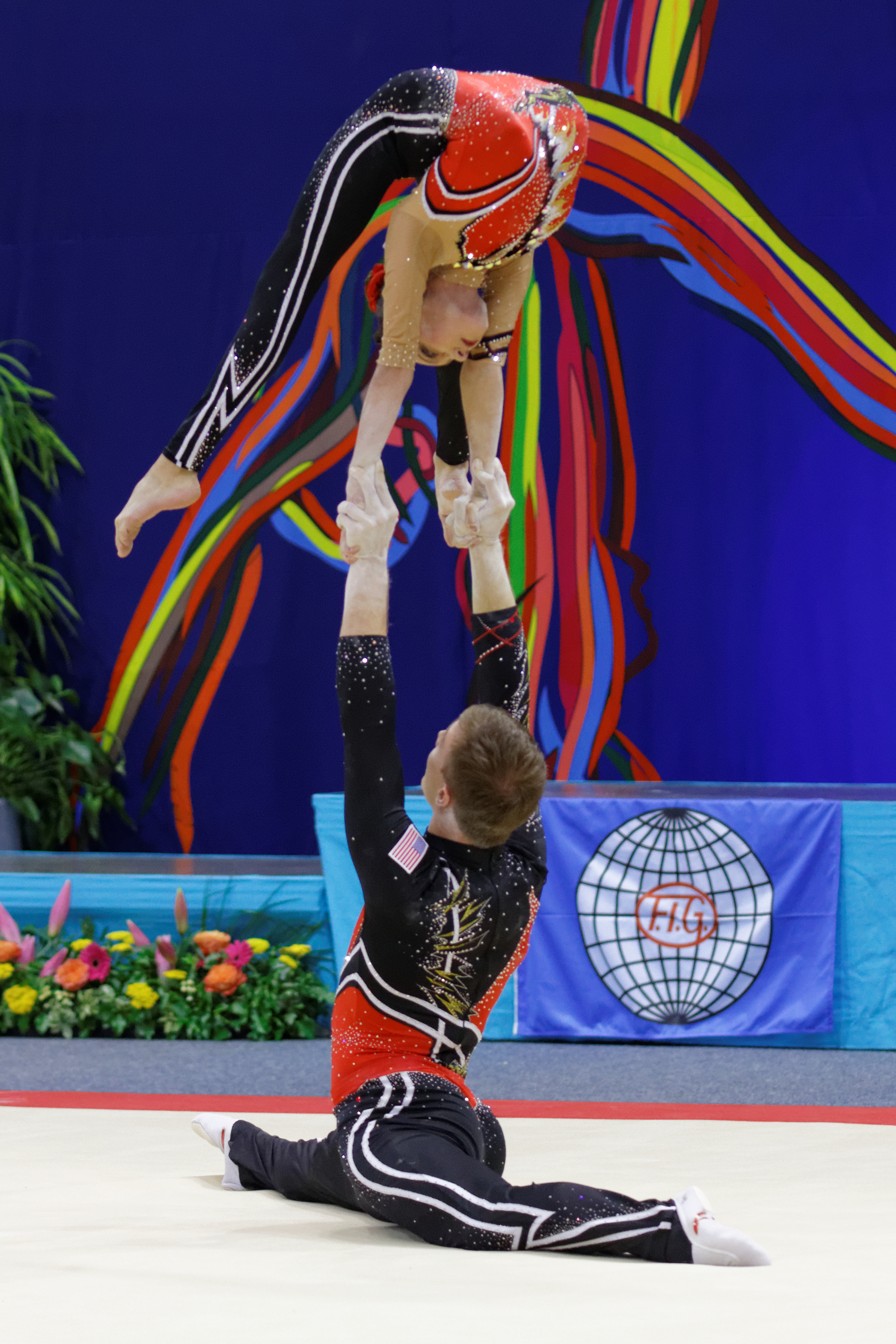
Brian Kincher and Eirian Smith at the 2014 Acrobatic Gymnastics World Championships.

Brian Kincher (born August 16, 1986) is an American male acrobatic gymnast. With Eirian Smith, he competed in the 2014 Acrobatic Gymnastics World Championships.
