= Eirian Smith =

American acrobatic gymnast

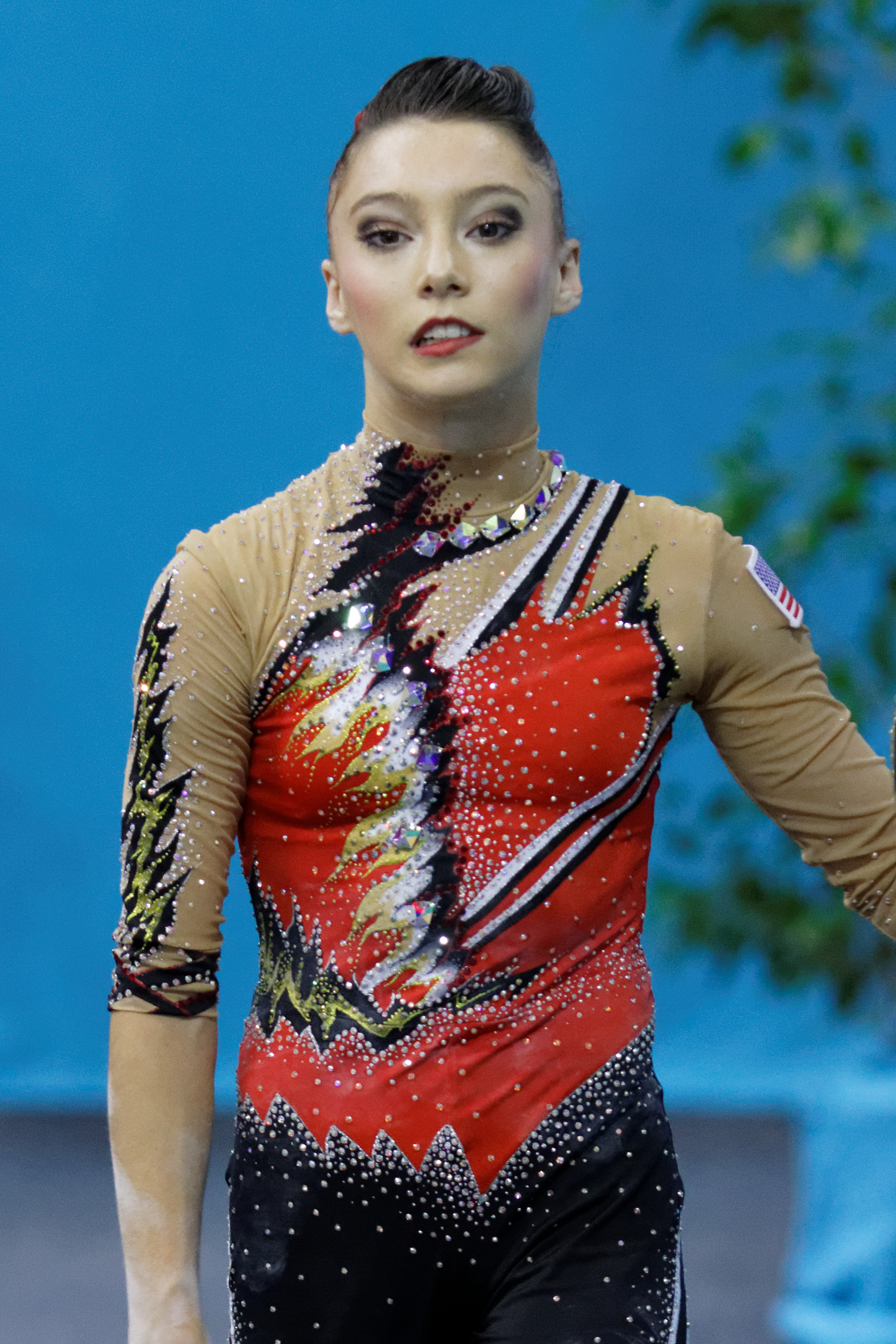
- Eirian Smith at the 2014 Acrobatic Gymnastics World Championships.

Personal information
- Born: June 26, 1998 (age 28)

Gymnastics career
- Discipline: Acrobatic gymnastics
- Country represented: United States
- Club: WestCoast Training Center
- Head coach: Marie Annonson

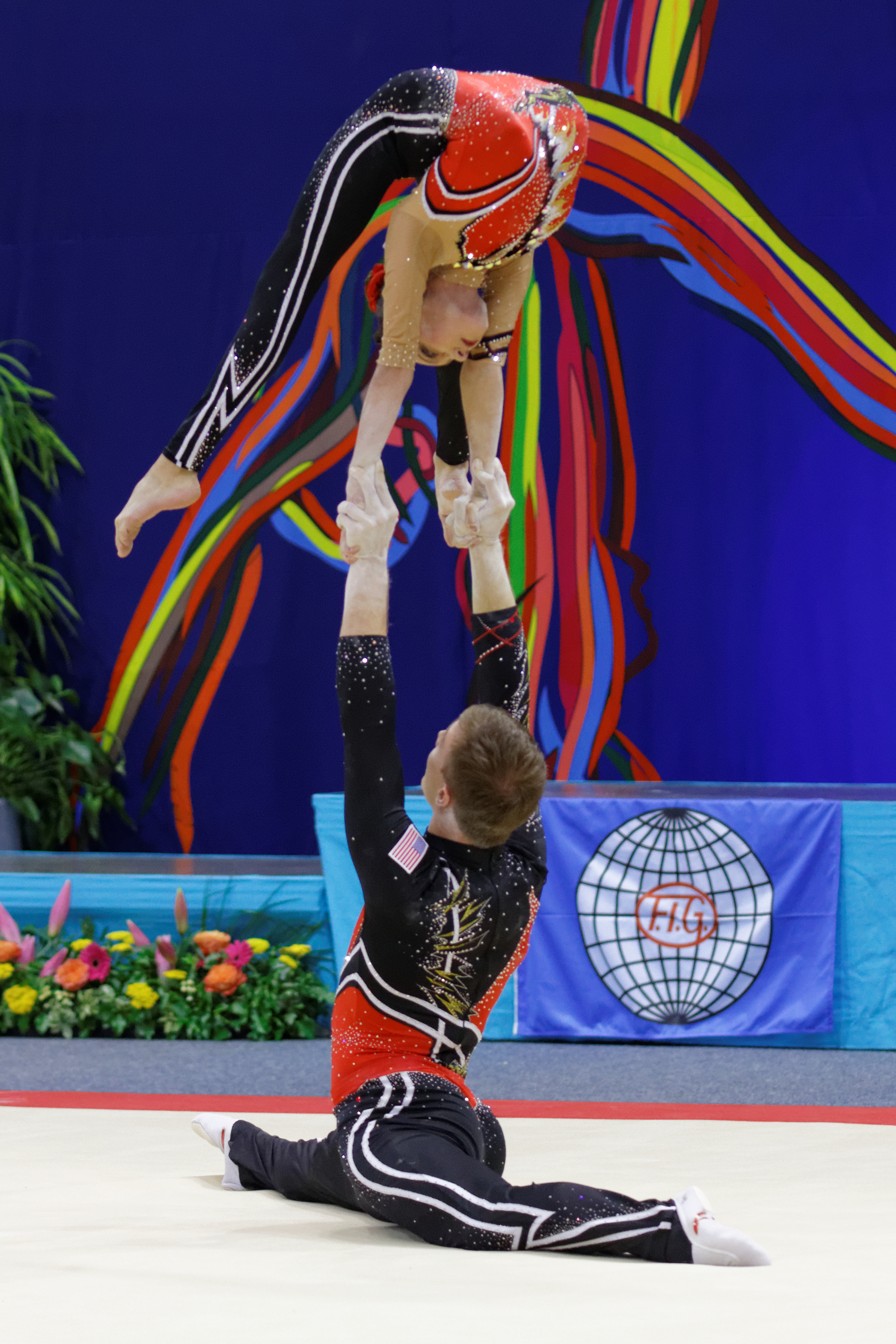
Eirian Smith and Brian Kincher at the 2014 Acrobatic Gymnastics World Championships.

Eirian Smith (born June 26, 1998) is an American female acrobatic gymnast. With Brian Kincher, she competed in the 2014 Acrobatic Gymnastics World Championships.
