= Georgia Lancaster =

British acrobatic gymnast

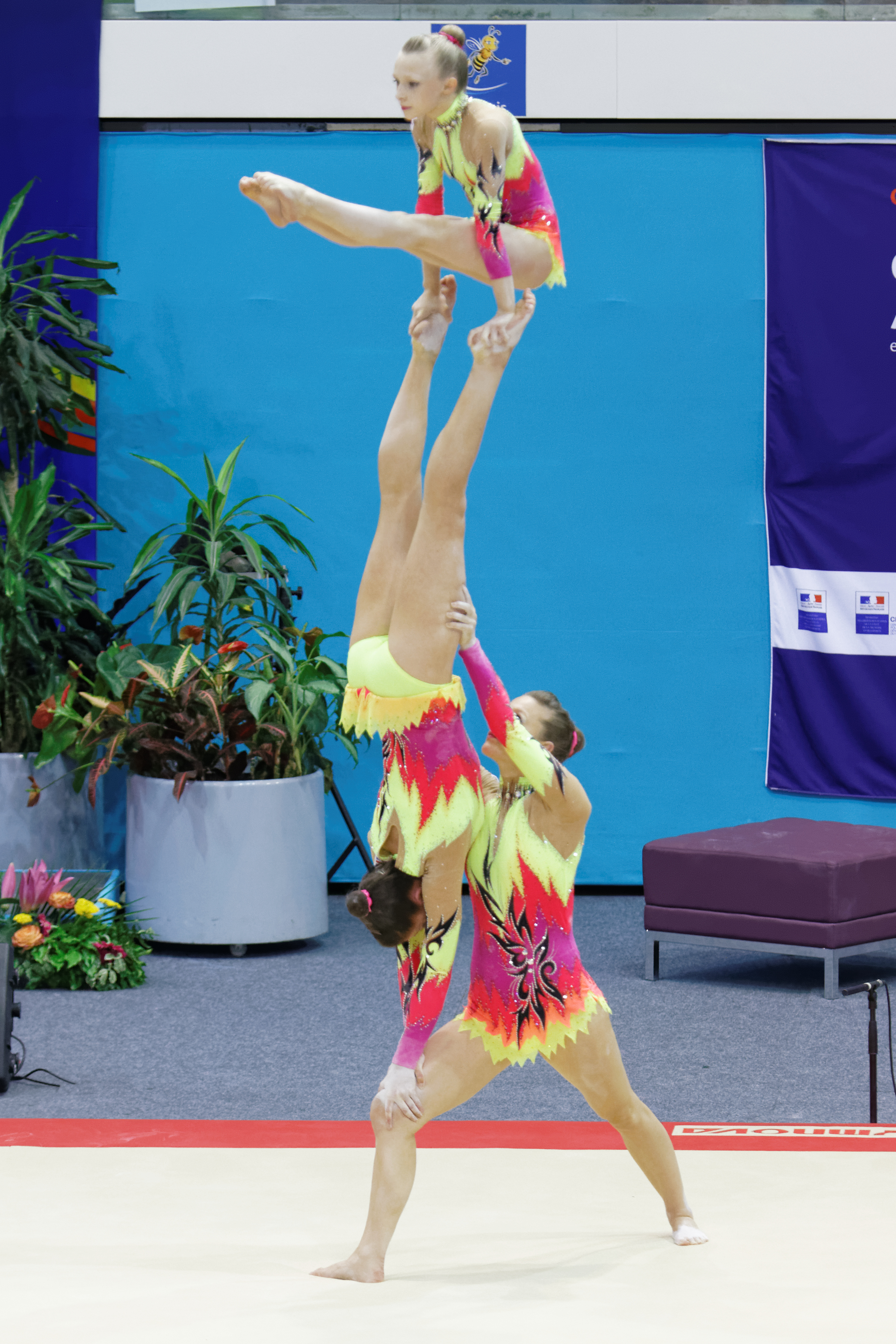

Personal information
- Born: 7 December 1995 (age 30)

Gymnastics career
- Discipline: Acrobatic gymnastics
- Country represented: Great Britain; (Great Britain)
- Club: Heathrow Gymnastics Club
- Head coach: Neil Griffiths
- Choreographer: Nicola Yellop, Anna Matyskina
- Retired: July 2014
Medal record
Women's acrobatic gymnastics
Representing Great Britain
World Championships
Gold medal – first place	2014 Levallois-Perret	Group
European Championships
Silver medal – second place	2013 Odivelas	Group - Dynamic
Silver medal – second place	2013 Odivelas	Group - All Around

Georgia Lancaster (born 7 December 1995) is a British female acrobatic gymnast. With partners Elise Matthews and Millie Spalding. Lancaster trained as an acrobatic gymnast for over 13 years, competing both nationally and internationally. She started off training at Spelthorne Gymnastics Club and later moved to Heathrow Gymnastics Club. Lancaster was British Champion three times, over the years of 2010, 2011 and 2013 - twice as a Women's Pair (with partner Megan Garraghan) and once in a Women's Group, alongside Matthews and Spalding. The trio achieved gold in the 2014 Acrobatic Gymnastics World Championships held in Levallois, Paris - becoming the first Great Britain trio to win the Senior World Championships in history.
