= Mariana Gradim Alves Amorim =

Portuguese acrobatic gymnast

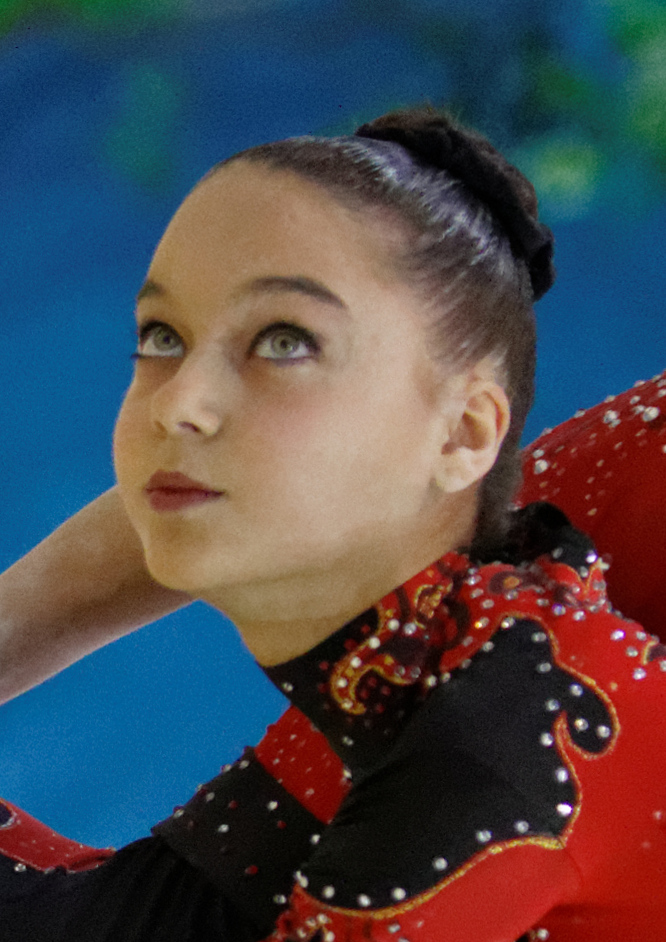
- Mariana Gradim Alves Amorim at the 2014 Acrobatic Gymnastics World Championships

Personal information
- Born: 15 October 1995 (age 30)

Gymnastics career
- Discipline: Acrobatic gymnastics
- Country represented: Portugal

Mariana Gradim Alves Amorim (born 15 October 1995) is a Portuguese female acrobatic gymnast. With partner Alfredo Pereira, Gradim Alves Amorim competed in the 2014 Acrobatic Gymnastics World Championships.
