= Yauheni Novikau =

Belarusian acrobatic gymnast

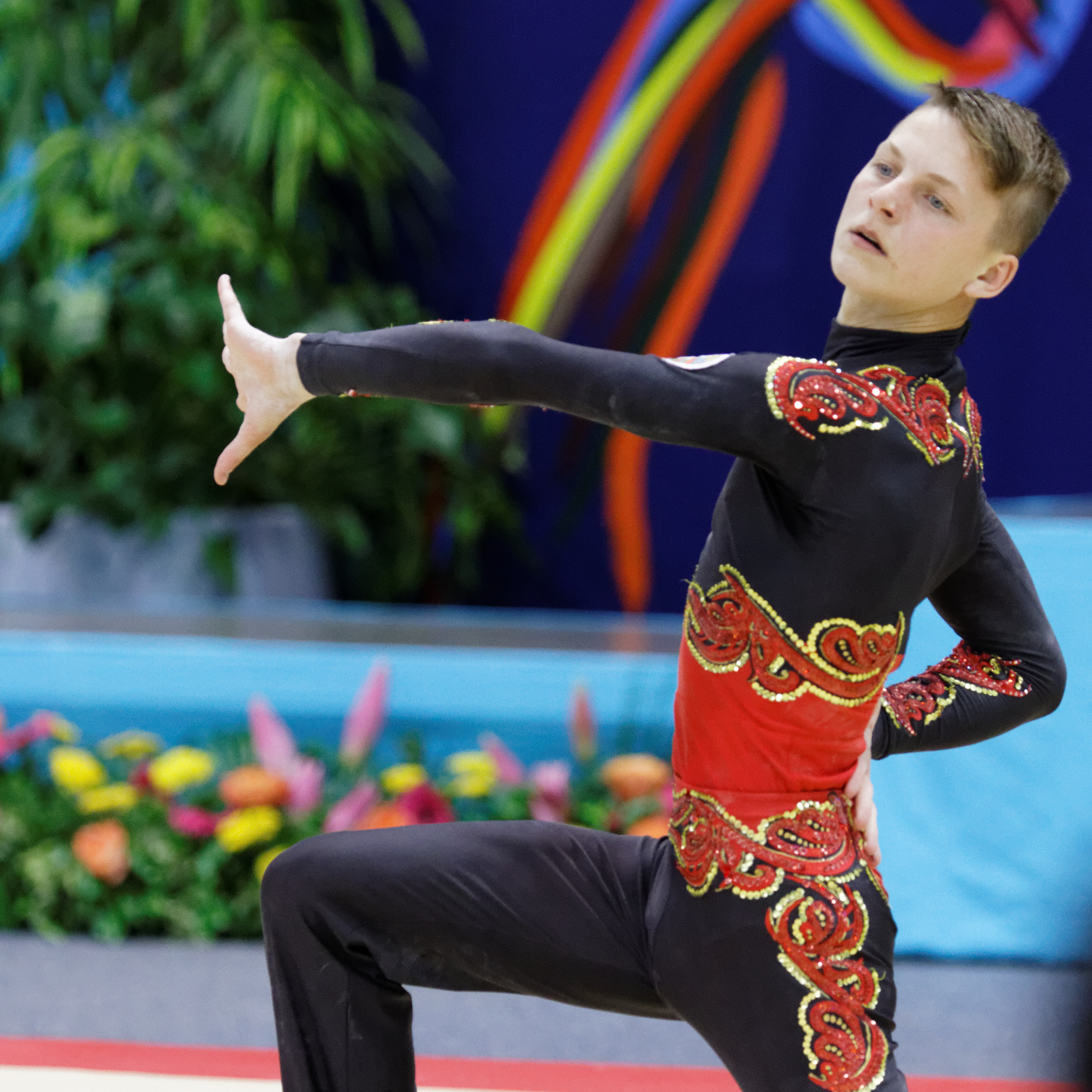
- Yauheni Novikau at the 2014 Acrobatic Gymnastics World Championships.

Personal information
- Born: 4 May 1996 (age 30)

Gymnastics career
- Discipline: Acrobatic gymnastics
- Country represented: Belarus
Medal record
World Championships
Silver medal – second place	2014 Levallois-Perret	Men's Pair

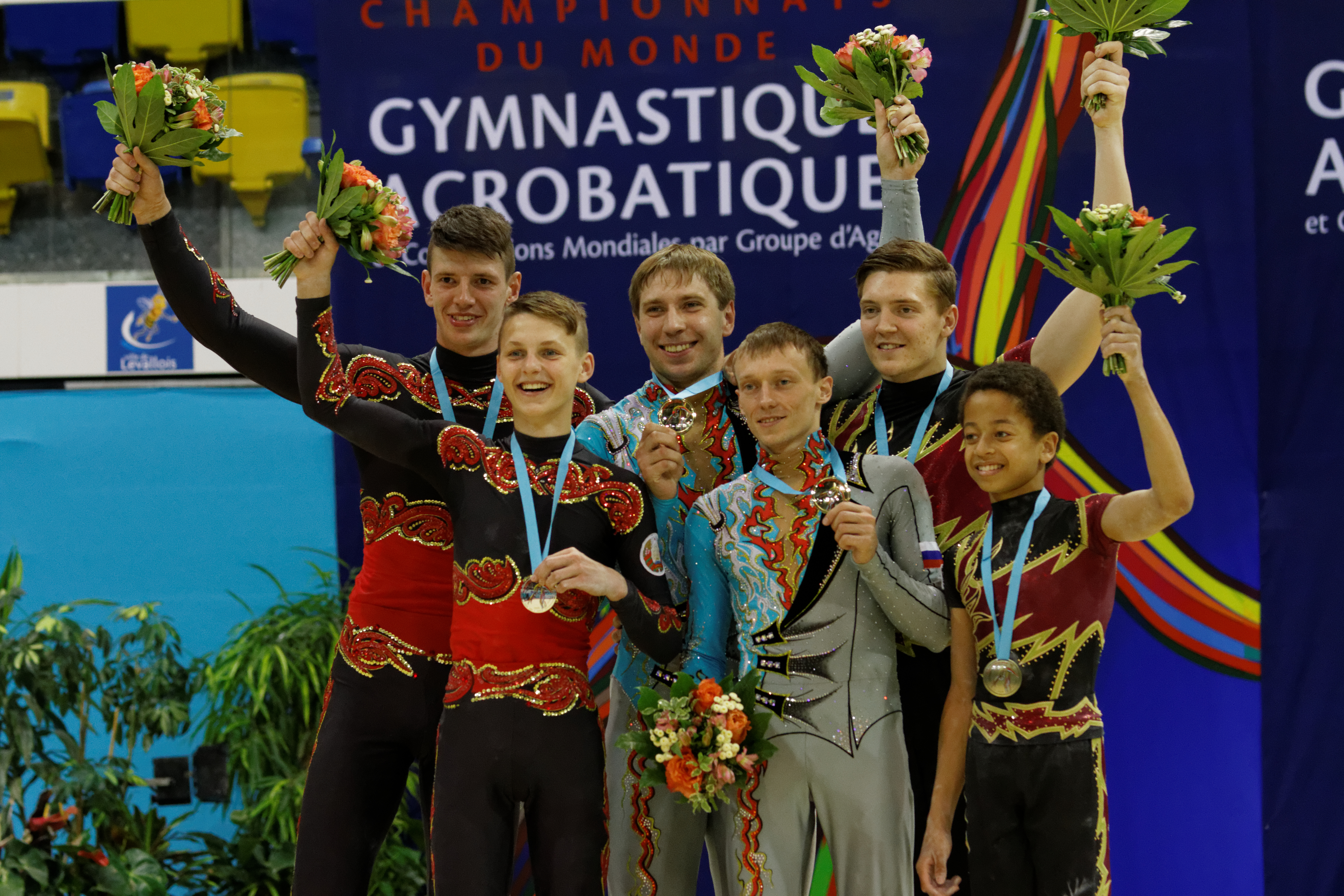
Yauheni Novikau and Ilya Rybinski at the 2014 Acrobatic Gymnastics World Championships.

Yauheni Novikau (born 4 May 1996) is a Belarusian male acrobatic gymnast. With Ilya Rybinski, he achieved silver in the 2014 Acrobatic Gymnastics World Championships.
