= Ilya Rybinski =

Belarusian acrobatic gymnast

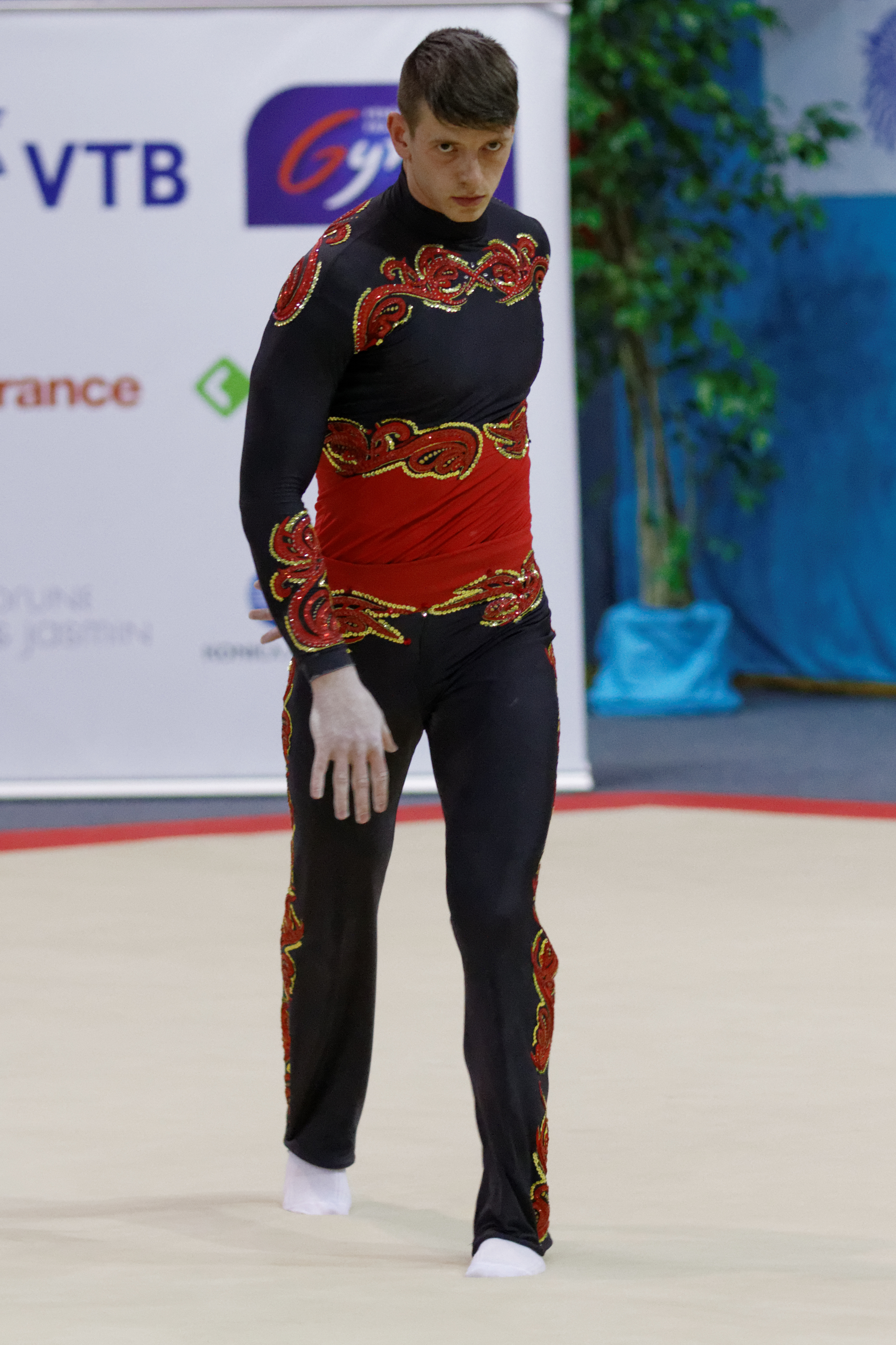
- Ilya Rybinski at the 2014 Acrobatic Gymnastics World Championships.

Personal information
- Born: 3 August 1993 (age 33)

Gymnastics career
- Discipline: Acrobatic gymnastics
- Country represented: Belarus
Medal record
World Championships
Silver medal – second place	2014 Levallois-Perret	Men's Pair

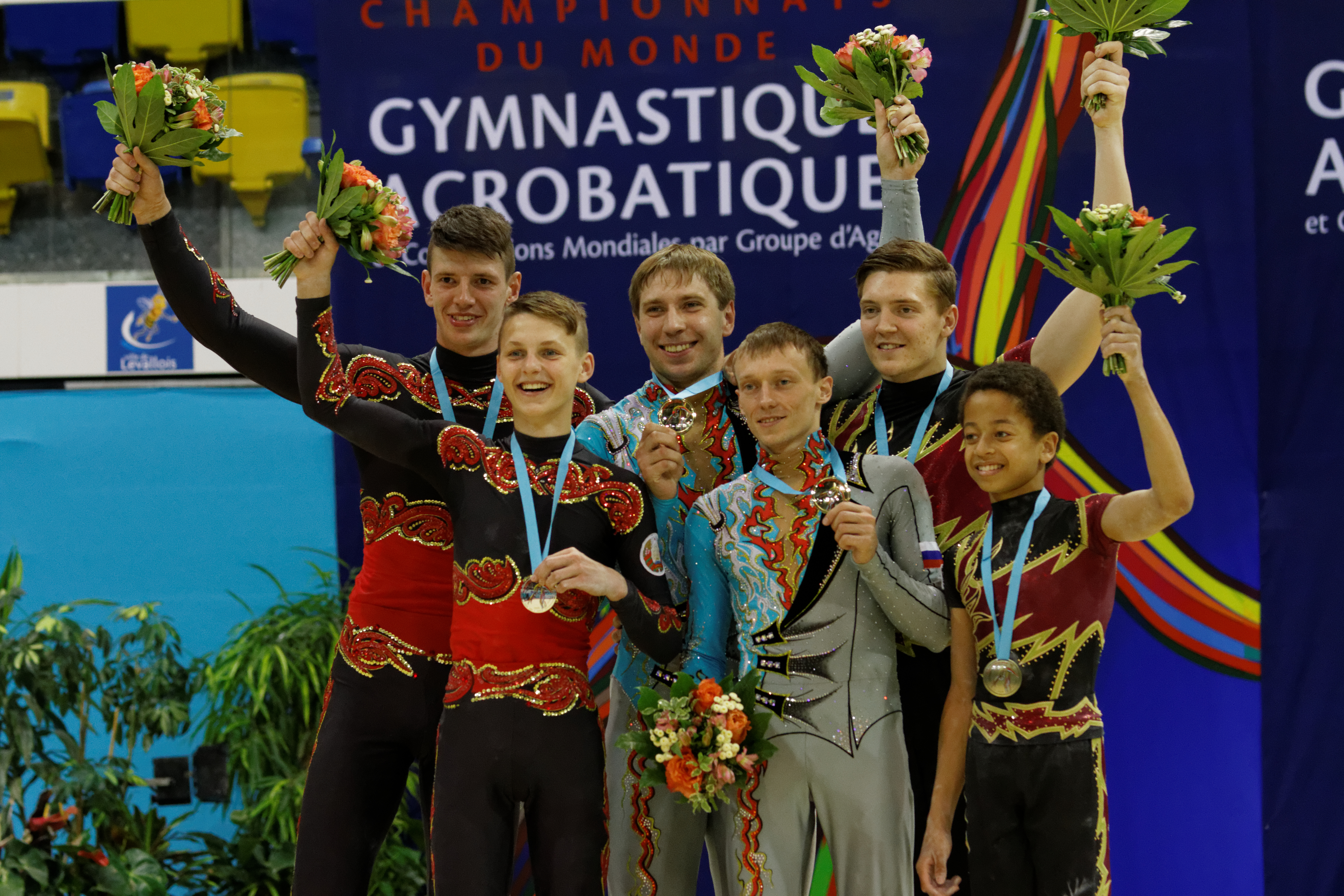
Ilya Rybinski and Yauheni Novikau at the 2014 Acrobatic Gymnastics World Championships.

Ilya Rybinski (born 3 August 1993) is a Belarusian male acrobatic gymnast. With Yauheni Novikau, he achieved silver in the 2014 Acrobatic Gymnastics World Championships.
