= Sophie Bruehmann =

German acrobatic gymnast

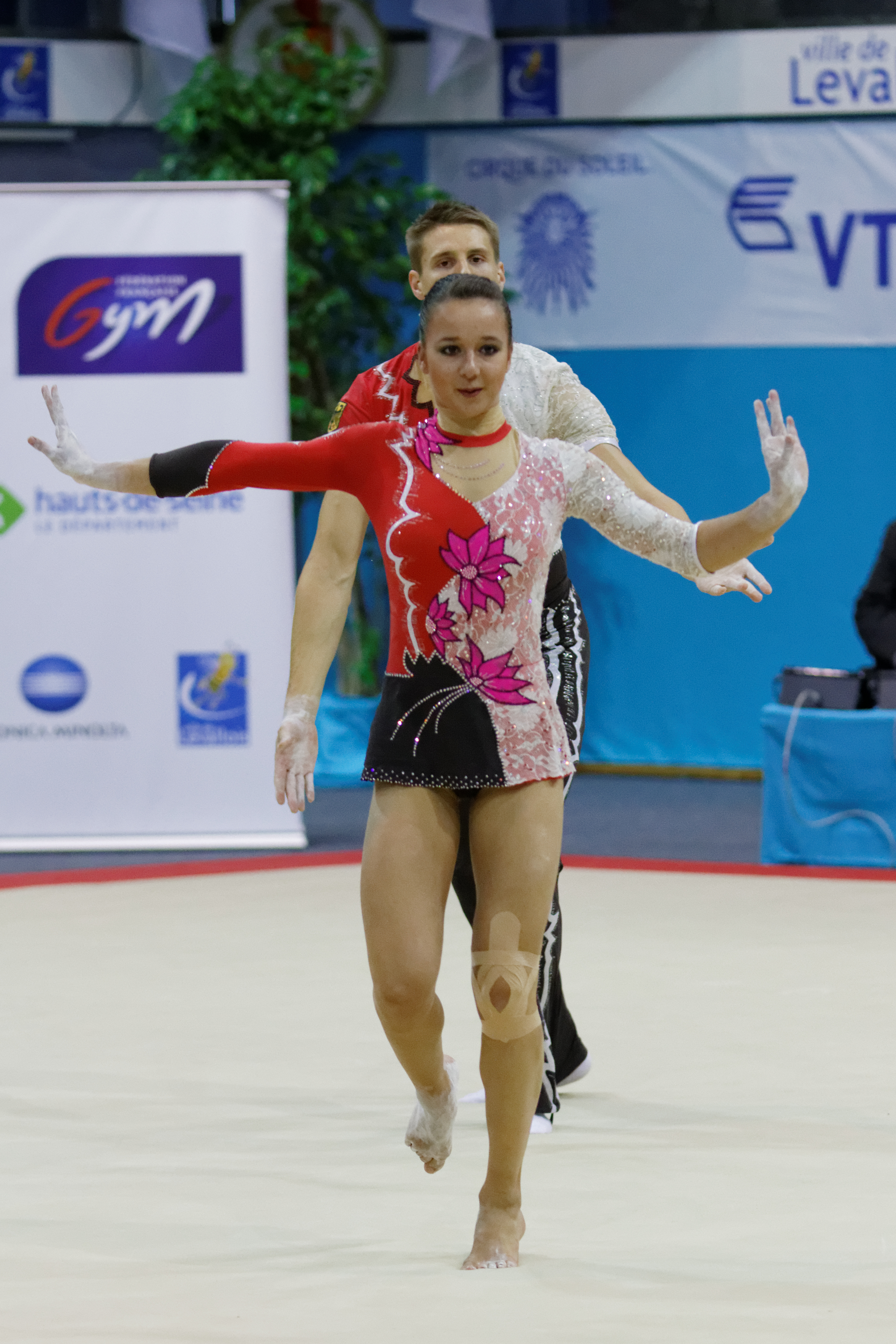

Personal information
- Born: 15 June 1995 (age 31)

Gymnastics career
- Discipline: Acrobatic gymnastics
- Country represented: Germany

Sophie Bruehmann (born 15 June 1995) is a German female acrobatic gymnast. Along with her partner, Nikolai Rein, she competed in the 2014 Acrobatic Gymnastics World Championships.
