= Alfredo Pereira =

Portuguese acrobatic gymnast

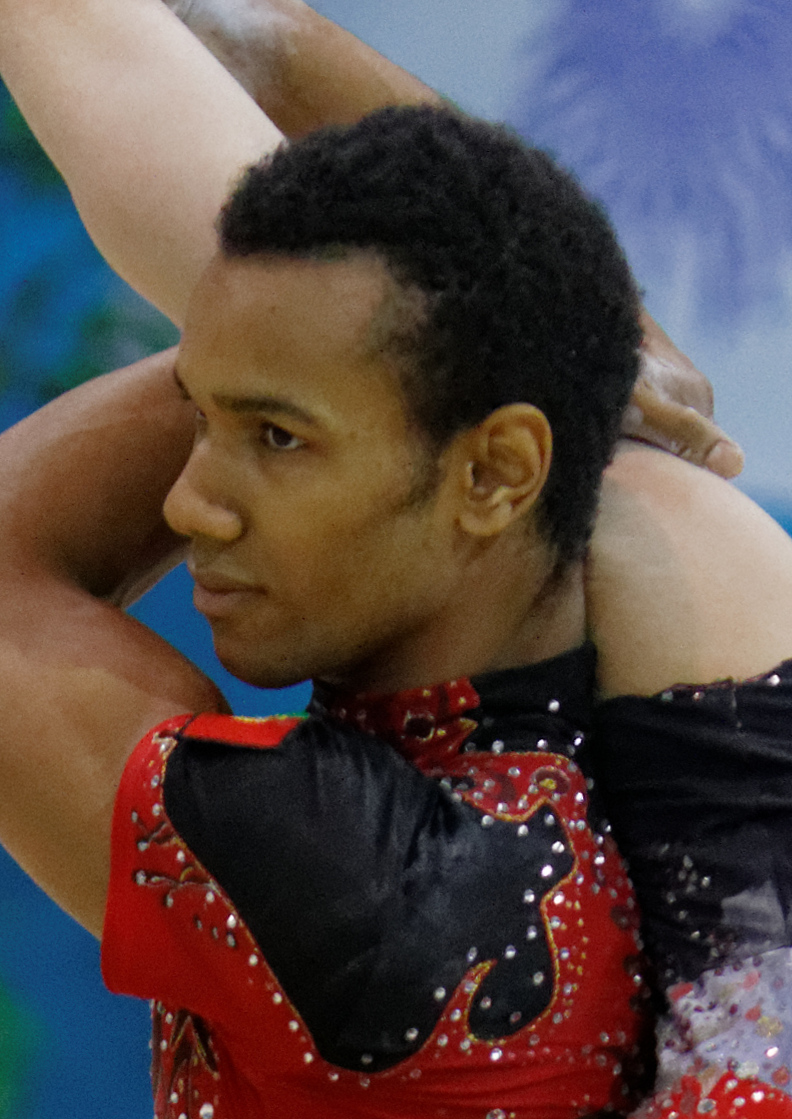
- Alfredo Pereira at the 2014 Acrobatic Gymnastics World Championships

Personal information
- Born: 23 May 1992 (age 34)

Gymnastics career
- Discipline: Acrobatic gymnastics
- Country represented: Portugal

Alfredo Pereira (born 23 May 1992) is a Portuguese male acrobatic gymnast. With partner Mariana Gradim Alves Amorim, Pereira competed in the 2014 Acrobatic Gymnastics World Championships.
