= Fabrício Carvalho de Abreu =

Brazilian acrobatic gymnast

Fabricio Carvalho de Abreu
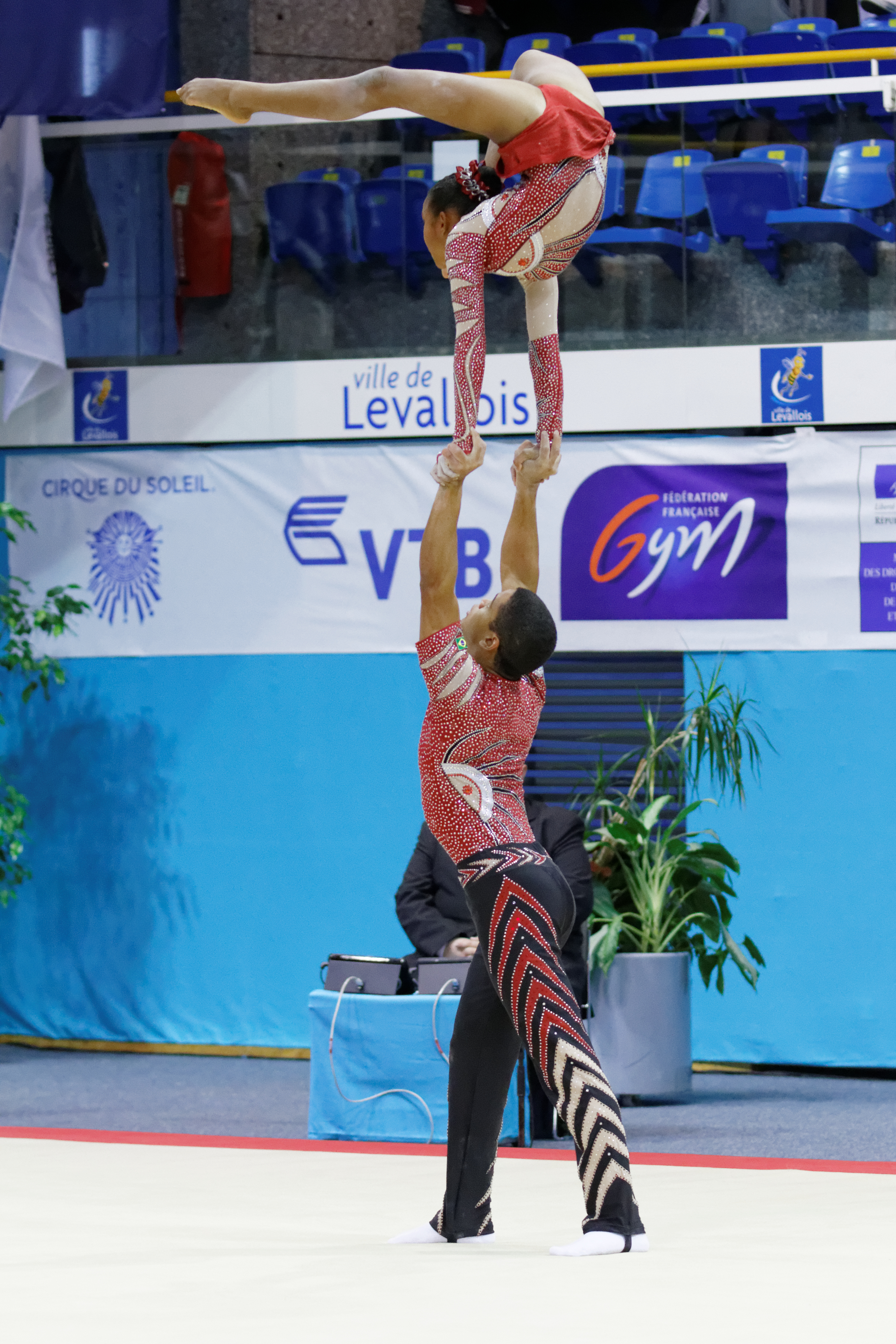

Personal information
- Born: October 21, 1990 (age 35)

Gymnastics career
- Discipline: Acrobatic gymnastics
- Country represented: Brazil

Fabricio Carvalho de Abreu (born October 21, 1990) is a Brazilian male acrobatic gymnast. Along with his partner, Yasmin Menezes, he competed in the 2014 Acrobatic Gymnastics World Championships.
