= Camille Curti =

French acrobatic gymnast

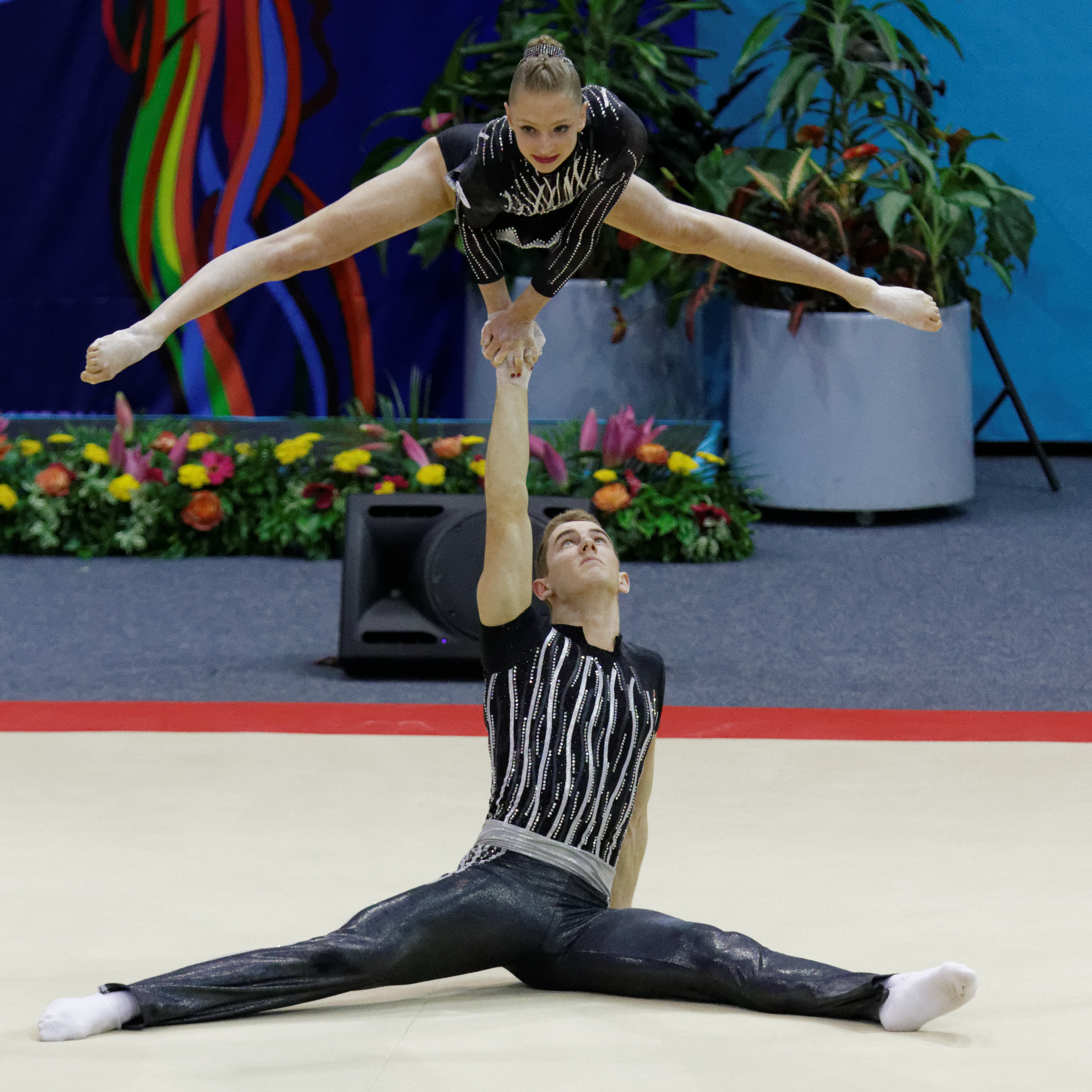
- Camille Curti and Alexis Martin at the 2014 Acrobatic Gymnastics World Championships

Personal information
- Born: 14 April 1999 (age 27)

Gymnastics career
- Discipline: Acrobatic gymnastics
- Country represented: France
- Club: OAJLP
- Head coaches: Margo Bardy, Eva Mauriceau
- Choreographer: Mélanie Avisse, Monique Hagard, Karine Lemêtre

Camille Curti (born 14 April 1999) is a French female acrobatic gymnast. With partner Alexis Martin, Curti achieved 7th at the 2014 Acrobatic Gymnastics World Championships.
