= Nikolai Rein =

German acrobatic gymnast

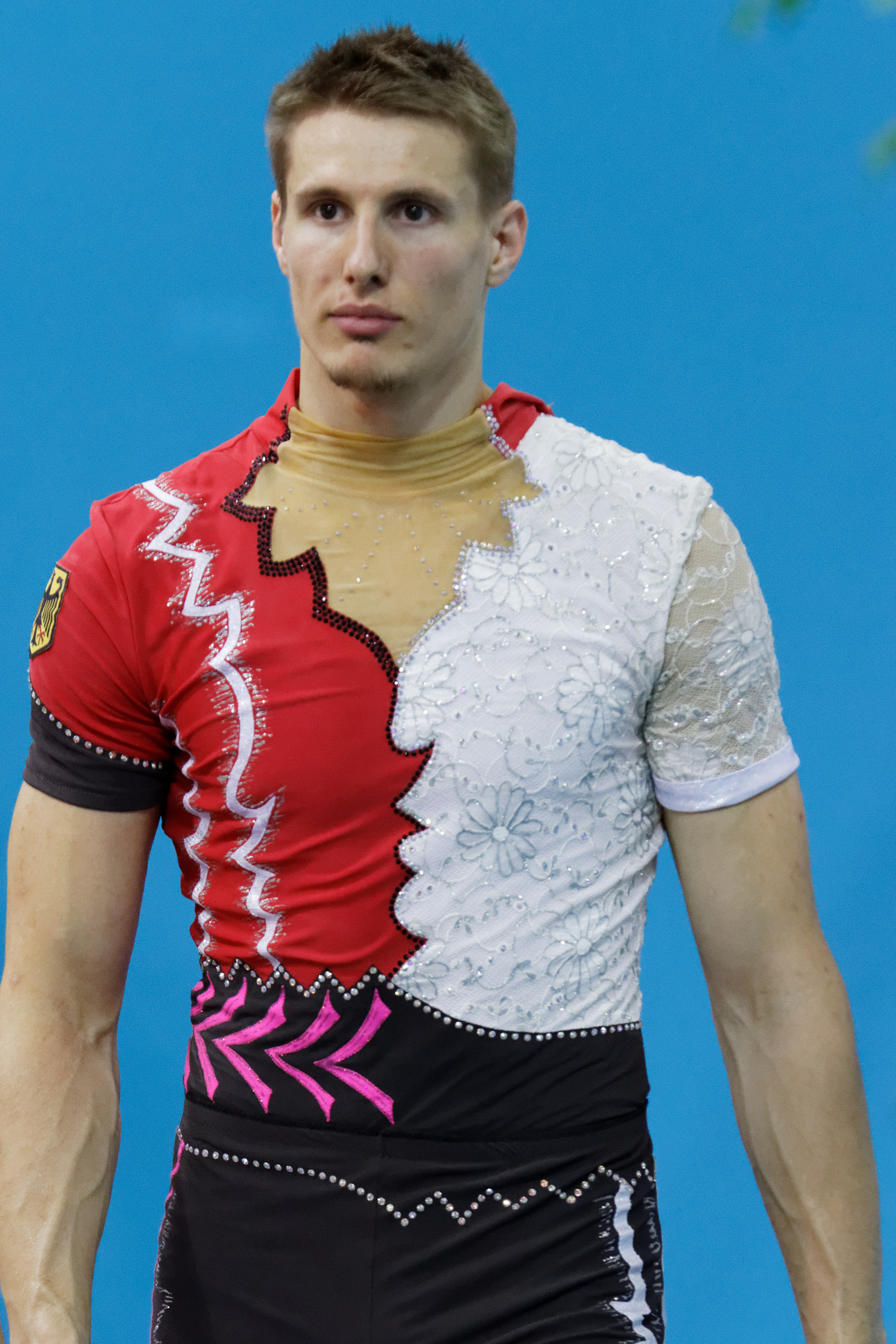

Personal information
- Born: 25 November 1989 (age 36)

Gymnastics career
- Discipline: Acrobatic gymnastics
- Country represented: Germany

Nikolai Rein (born 25 November 1989) is a German male acrobatic gymnast. Along with his partner, Sophie Bruehmann, he competed in the 2014 Acrobatic Gymnastics World Championships.
