= Ryan Ward (gymnast) =

American acrobatic gymnast

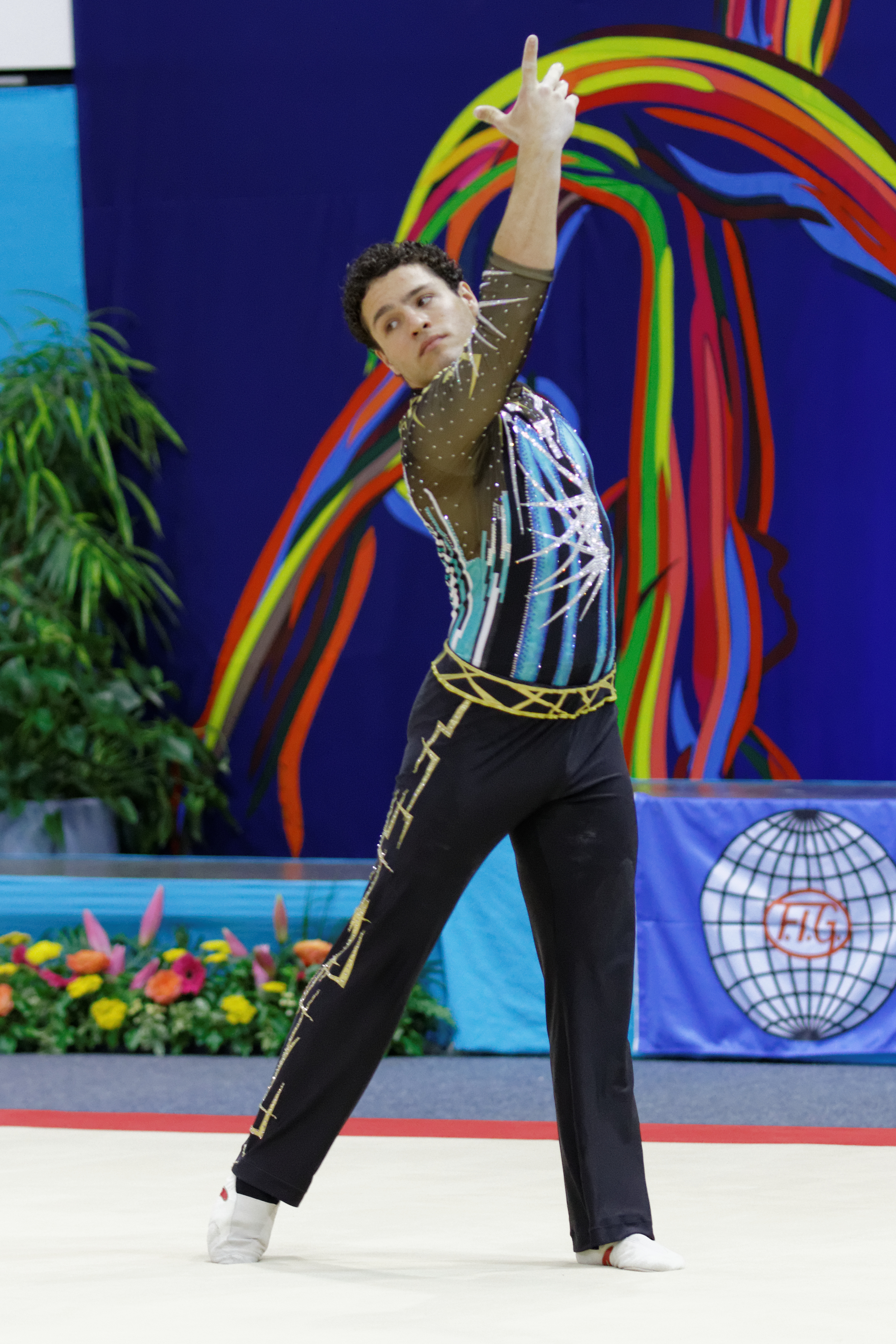
- Ryan Ward at the 2014 Acrobatic Gymnastics World Championships.

Personal information
- Born: November 13, 1989 (age 36)

Gymnastics career
- Discipline: Acrobatic gymnastics
- Country represented: United States
- Club: Realis Gymnastics Academy
- Head coach: Youri Vorobiev
Medal record
Acrobatic gymnastics
Representing United States
World Championships
Bronze medal – third place	2014 Levallois-Perret	Mixed Pair

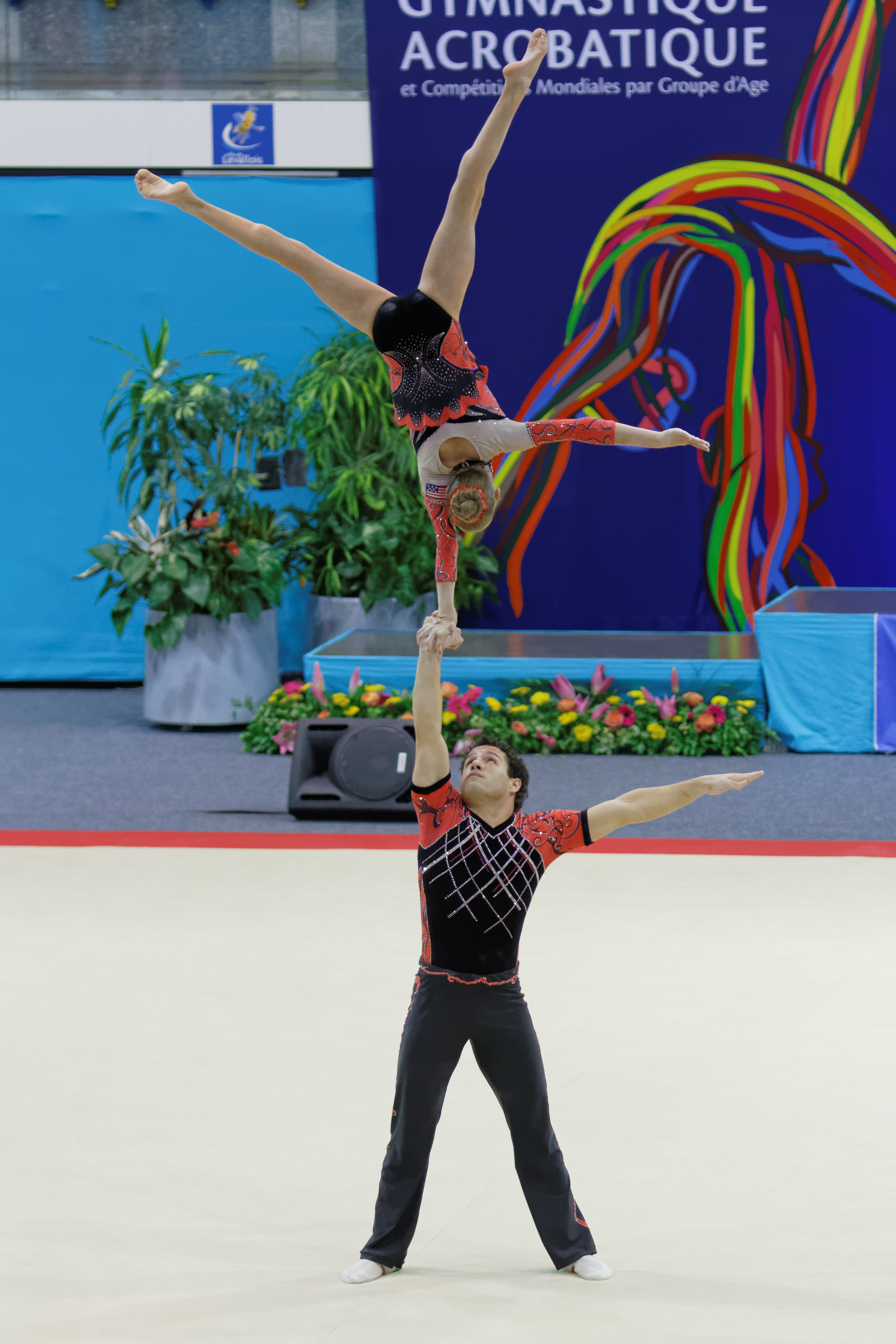
Ryan Ward and Kylie Boynton at the 2014 Acrobatic Gymnastics World Championships.

Ryan Ward (born November 13, 1989) is an American male acrobatic gymnast. With Kylie Boynton, he was awarded the bronze medal in the 2014 Acrobatic Gymnastics World Championships.
