= Yasmin Menezes =

Brazilian acrobatic gymnast

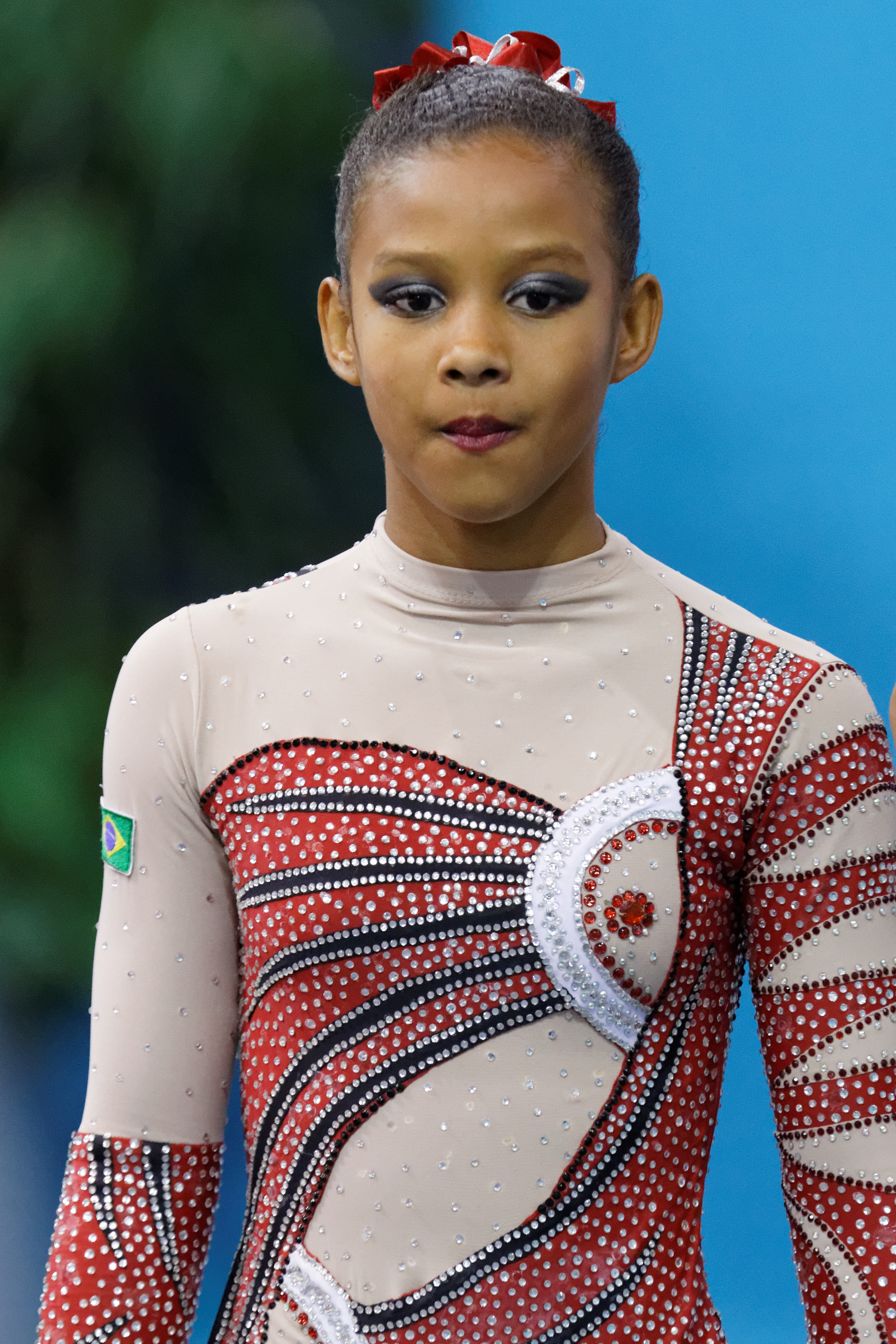

Personal information
- Born: September 3, 1998 (age 28)

Gymnastics career
- Discipline: Acrobatic gymnastics
- Country represented: Brazil

Yasmin Menezes (born September 3, 1998) is a Brazilian female acrobatic gymnast. Along with her partner, Fabricio Carvalho de Abreu, she competed in the 2014 Acrobatic Gymnastics World Championships.
