= Alice Upcott =

British acrobatic gymnast

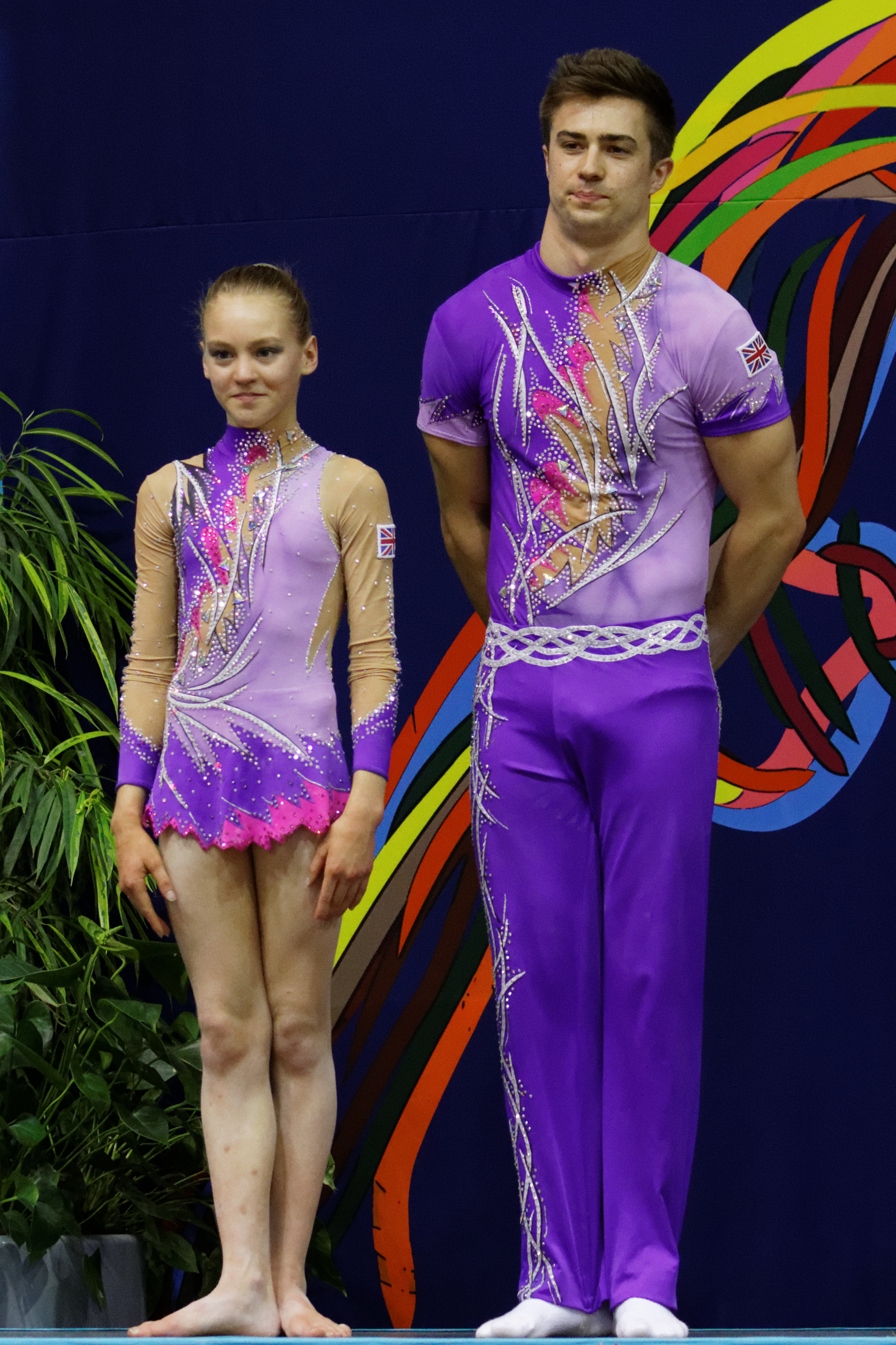
- Alice Upcott and Dominic Smith at the 2014 Acrobatic Gymnastics World Championships.

Personal information
- Full name: Alice Poppy Rebekah Upcott
- Born: 14 February 1998 (age 28)

Gymnastics career
- Discipline: Acrobatic gymnastics
- Country represented: United Kingdom; (2009-2014)
- Club: Spelthorne School of Gymnastics Heathrow Gymnastics Club
- Head coach: Neil Griffiths
- Assistant coach: Andrew Griffiths
- Retired: July 2014
Medal record
Acrobatic gymnastics
Representing Great Britain
World Games
Gold medal – first place	2013 Cali	Mixed Pair
World Championships
Silver medal – second place	2012 Orlando Florida	Mixed Pair
Silver medal – second place	2014 Levallois-Perret	Mixed Pair
European Championships
Gold medal – first place	2009 Vila Do Conde	Mixed Pair
Silver medal – second place	2011 Bulgaria	Mixed Pair
Gold medal – first place	2013 Odivelas	Mixed Pair

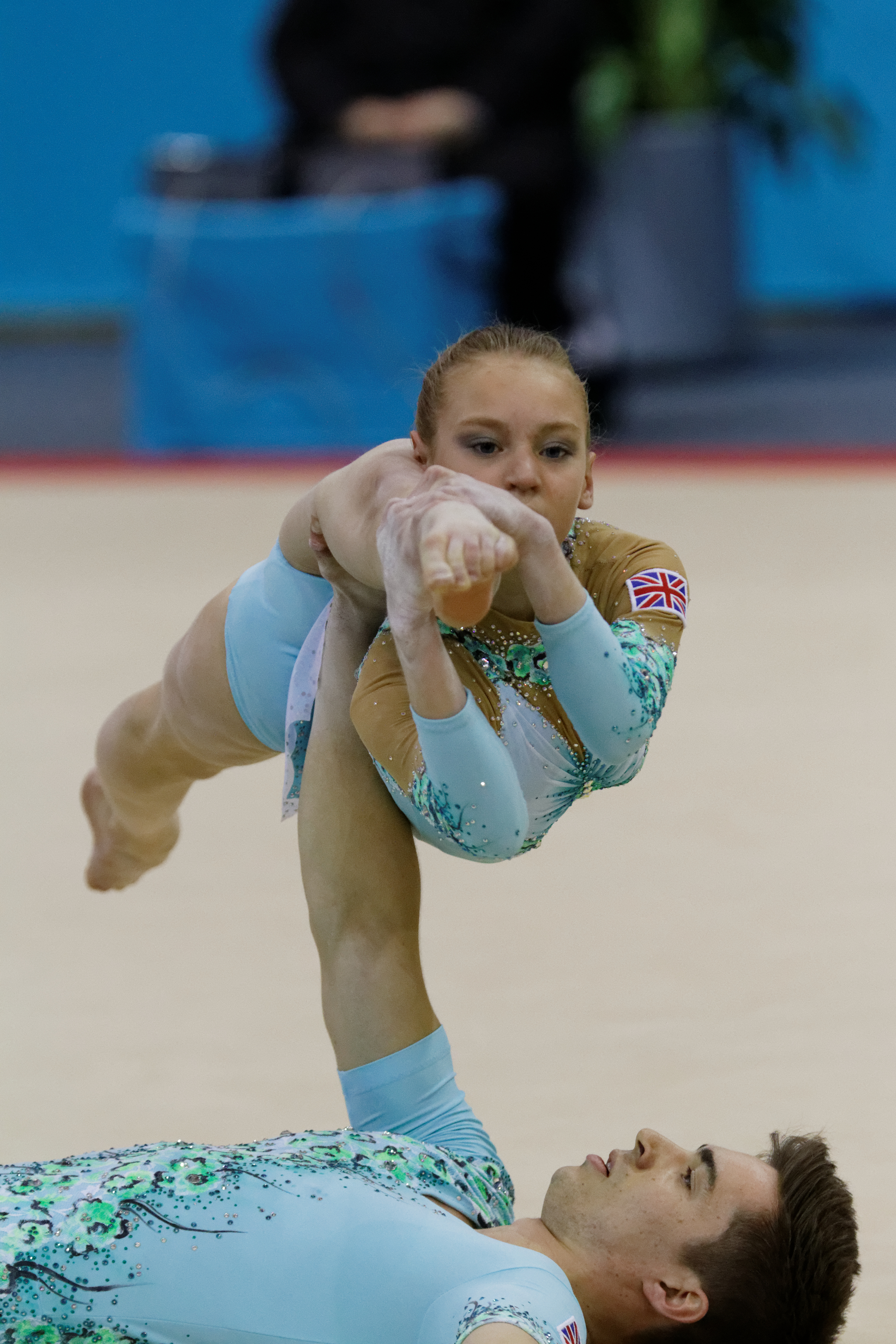
Alice Upcott at the 2014 Acrobatic Gymnastics World Championships.

Alice Upcott (born 14 February 1998) is a retired British female acrobatic gymnast and the sister of Edward Upcott, world champion in 2010. With Dominic Smith, she was awarded the gold medal in the 2013 World Games, the gold medal at the 2013 Acrobatic Gymnastics European Championships and the silver medal in the 2014 Acrobatic Gymnastics World Championships.

Upcott was a member of spelbound, the gymnastic group who rose to fame in 2010, winning the fourth series of Britain's Got Talent. The prize was £100,000 and the opportunity to appear at the 2010 Royal Variety Performance. Her older brother, Edward is a former member of Spellbound and 2010 World Champion, 2012 world silver medalist and 2008 world bronze medalist in Men's pair, while her younger brother Adam is the 2012 World Junior Champion and 2016 world bronze medalist in Men's Group.

== Personal life ==
Alice Poppy Rebekah Upcott is the second to last youngest out of five siblings. Upcott was born and raised in Egham, Surrey by her parents. When she was just two years old, she decided she wanted to try out gymnastics after her older brother, Edward began training and competing in the sport. From then on, she followed in his footsteps. Upcott joined the acrobatic gymnastic elite group at Spelthorne School of Gymnastics in the summer of 2008. In 2009, she began her competing as an 11-16 mixed pair with Christopher Longley. Upcott and Longley won the British Championships in 2009 and the European Championships later that year. In 2010, Upcott moved with her coaches Neil and Andrew Griffiths to Heathrow School of Gymnastics.

In 2011, Upcott competed at the European Championships in Bulgaria, this time as a junior (12-18) mixed pair with Dominic Smith. They won a bronze medal in the dynamic discipline and finished with a silver medal overall. In 2012, Upcott and Smith won the British Championships before competing at the World Championships in Orlando Florida where they won a silver medal. In 2013, Upcott and Smith moved to the senior level in acrobatic gymnastics. They won the British Championships before competing at the World Games in Cali where they were crowned World Games Champions. Later on in the year they also gained the title of European Champions at the European Championships in Odivelas.

In 2014, Upcott and Smith maintained the title of British Champions. In the April, whilst still competing as an acrobatic gymnast, Upcott began rehearsals with Michael Flatley's Lord of the Dance: Dangerous Games where she recreated the role of The Little Spirit. This lead her to perform in Trafalgar Square for West End Live. Both Upcott and Smith then competed at their final competition in July in Paris at the World Championships before they both retired finishing with a silver medal behind Russia.

In September 2014, Upcott performed her first ever show with Michael Flatley's Lord of the Dance: Dangerous Games at the London Palladium where she did a two-month run before a two-month tour around Europe to finish off the year. In March 2015, Upcott continued with the show at the Dominion Theatre for five months before her final three-month tour with the show. Upcott finished performing with Michael Flatley's Lord of the Dance: Dangerous Games in December 2015. Upcott is now currently training in Contemporary Dance at Trinity Laban Conservatoire of Music and Dance where she will graduate in Summer 2021.
