= Kiley Boynton =

American acrobatic gymnast (born 1998)

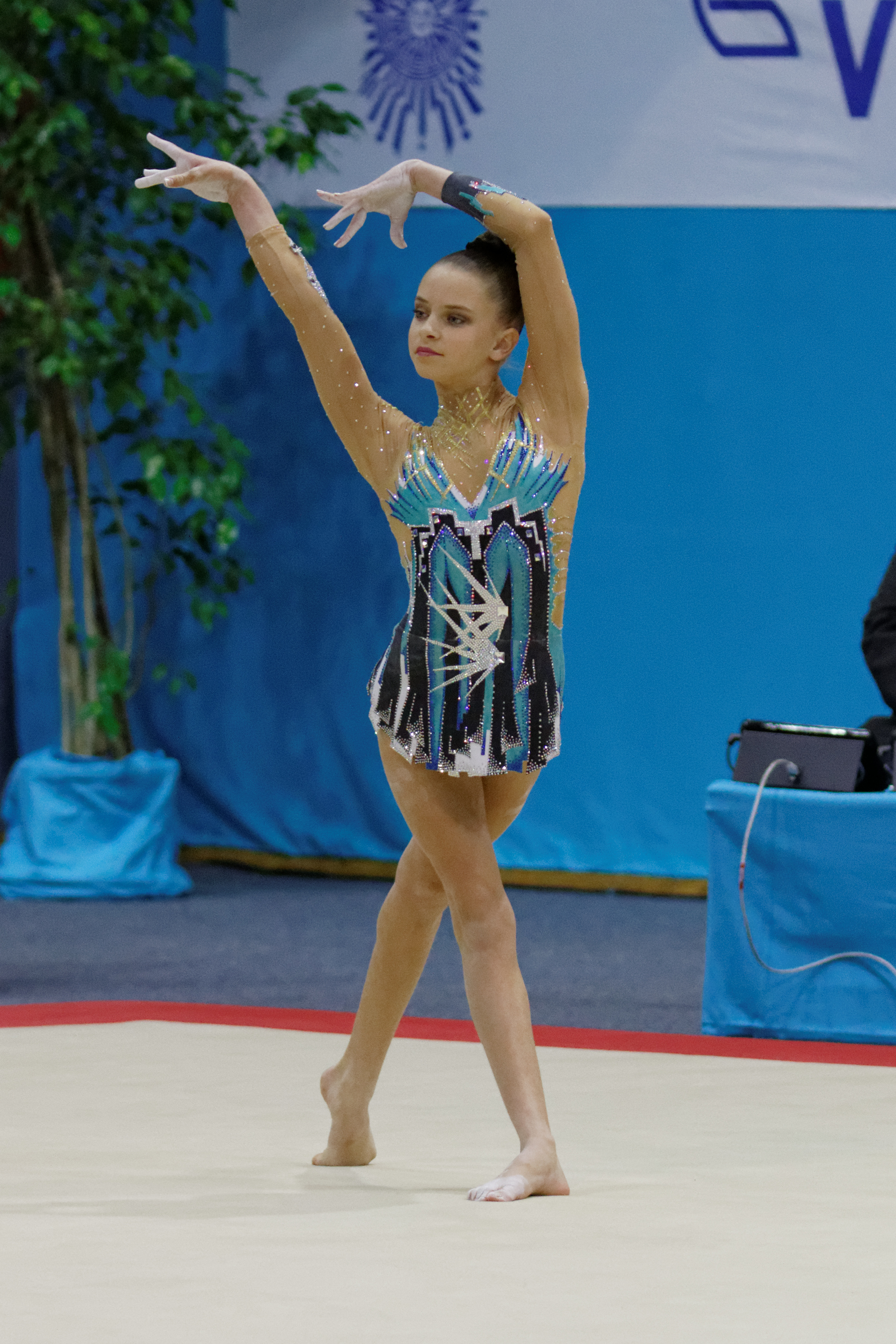
- Kiley Boynton at the 2014 Acrobatic Gymnastics World Championships.

Personal information
- Born: October 24, 1998 (age 27)

Gymnastics career
- Discipline: Acrobatic gymnastics
- Country represented: United States
- Club: Realis Gymnastics Academy
- Head coach: Youri Vorobiev
Medal record
Acrobatic Gymnastics
Representing United States
World Championships
Bronze medal – third place	2014 Levallois-Perret	Mixed Pair
World Cup
Gold medal – first place	2013 Sofia World Cup	Mixed Pair
Gold medal – first place	2014 Maia World Cup	Mixed Pair
Gold medal – first place	2015 Geneva World Cup	Mixed Pair
Gold medal – first place	2015 Varna World Cup	Mixed Pair
Bronze medal – third place	2015 Maia World Cup	Mixed Pair
USA Gymnastics Championships
Silver medal – second place	2013 Louisville	All Around
Gold medal – first place	2014 Louisville	All Around
Silver medal – second place	2014 Louisville	Balance
Gold medal – first place	2014 Louisville	Dynamic
US Acro Cup
Silver medal – second place	2011 Huntsville	All Around
Silver medal – second place	2013 Kearney	All Around
Gold medal – first place	2014 Huntsville	All Around
US National Championships
Bronze medal – third place	2008 Des Moines	All Around
Silver medal – second place	2010 Kississimme	All Around
Bronze medal – third place	2010 Kississimme	Dynamic
Silver medal – second place	2011 San Jose	All Around
Silver medal – second place	2011 San Jose	Balance
Silver medal – second place	2011 San Jose	Dynamic
Gold medal – first place	2012 Detroit	All Around
Silver medal – second place	2012 Detroit	Balance
Junior Olympic National Championships
Silver medal – second place	2009 St. Paul	All Around
Pat Wade Classic
Silver medal – second place	2013 Stoke-on-Trent	Mixed Pair
Freedom Cup
Silver medal – second place	2009 St. Paul	Mixed Pair

Kiley Boynton (born 1998) is an American female acrobatic gymnast. With Ryan Ward, she was awarded the bronze medal in the 2014 Acrobatic Gymnastics World Championships.

== Career ==
Along with her now-retired partner Ryan Ward, the pair were jointly named as acrobatics 'Athlete of the Year' by USA Gymnastics in 2014. She was a member of the AcroArmy, an acrobatic gymnastics group, which finished in third place on Season 9 of America's Got Talent in 2014.

Following her gymnastics career, she became head coach of the Arizona Acro Foundation.

== Personal life ==
Her sister Aisley Boynton is also an acrobatic gymnast in a mixed pair with Maxim Sedochenkov.
