= Gabriel Ferreira Ioshida =

Brazilian acrobatic gymnast

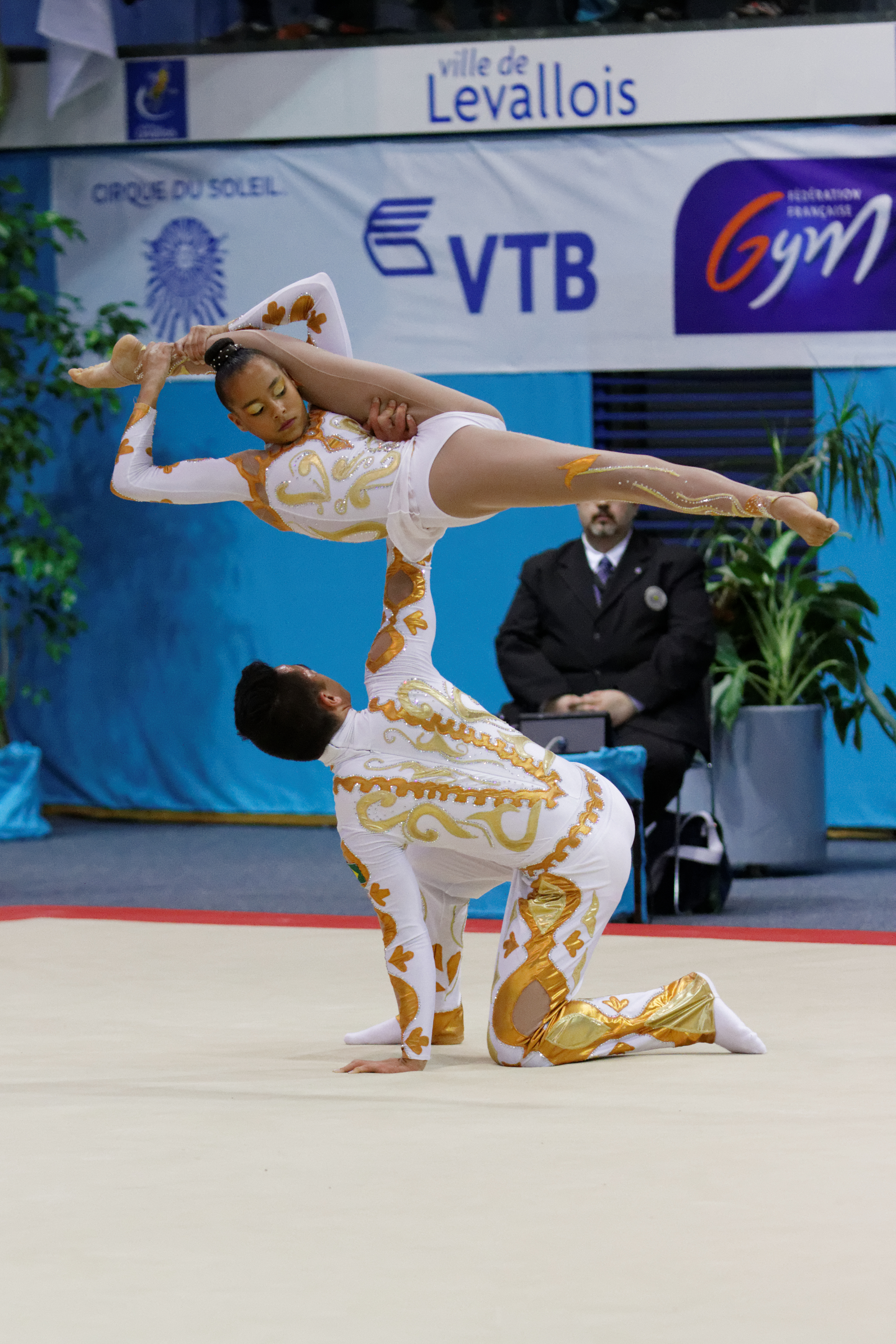

Personal information
- Born: November 11, 1993 (age 32)

Gymnastics career
- Discipline: Acrobatic gymnastics
- Country represented: Brazil

Gabriel Ferreira Ioshida (born November 11, 1993) is a Brazilian male acrobatic gymnast. Along with his partner, Juliana Dos Reis de Freitas, he competed in the 2014 Acrobatic Gymnastics World Championships.
