= Jakub Tronina =

Polish acrobatic gymnast

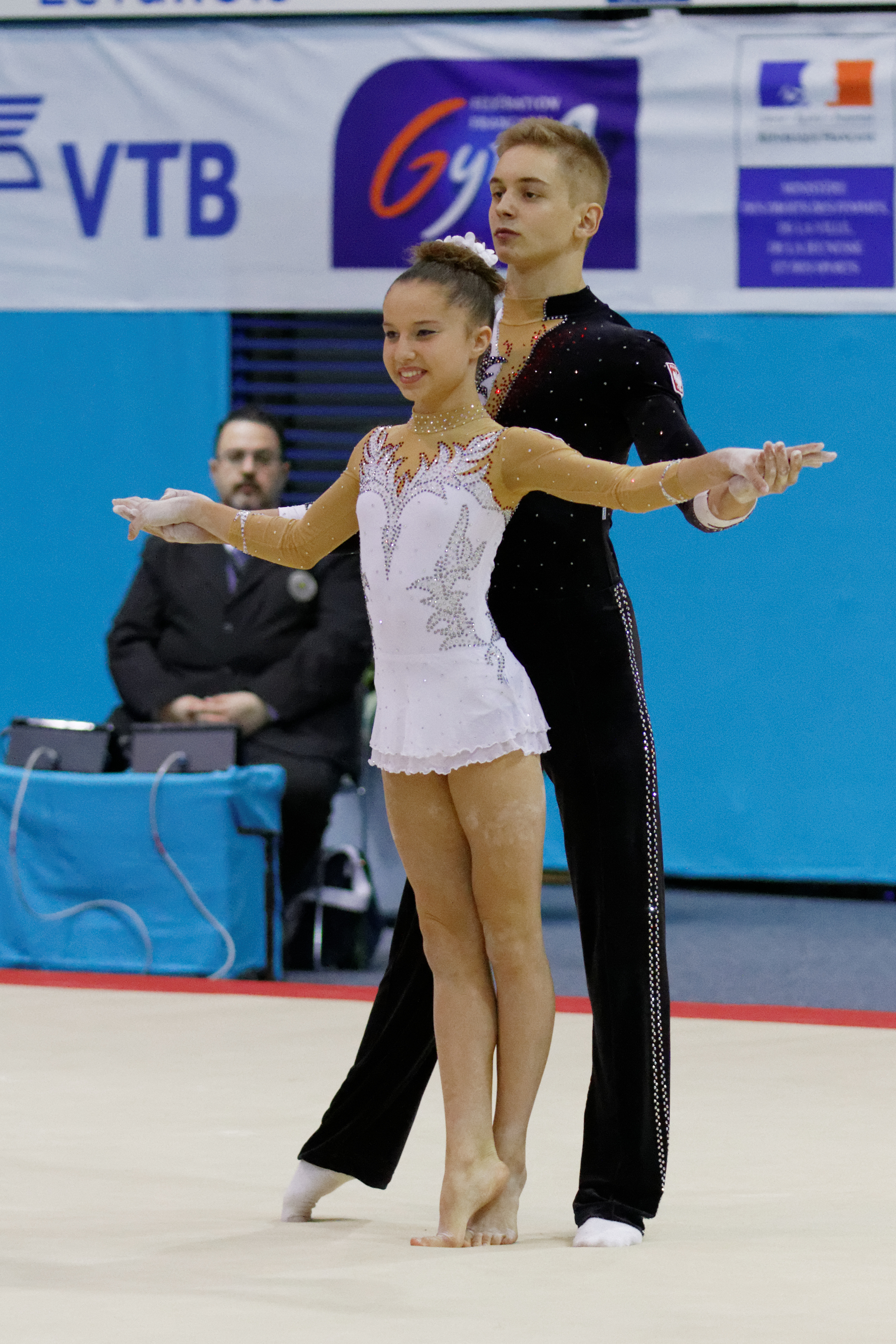
- Jakub Tronina and Iga Klesyk at the 2014 Acrobatic Gymnastics World Championships.

Personal information
- Born: 16 December 1996 (age 29) Rzeszów, Poland

Gymnastics career
- Discipline: Acrobatic gymnastics
- Country represented: Poland

Jakub Tronina (born 16 December 1996) is a Polish acrobatic gymnast. With Iga Klesyk, he competed in the 2014 Acrobatic Gymnastics World Championships.

Tronina is married to Kamila Krupa, a Polish show dancer.
