= Alexis Martin (gymnast) =

French acrobatic gymnast

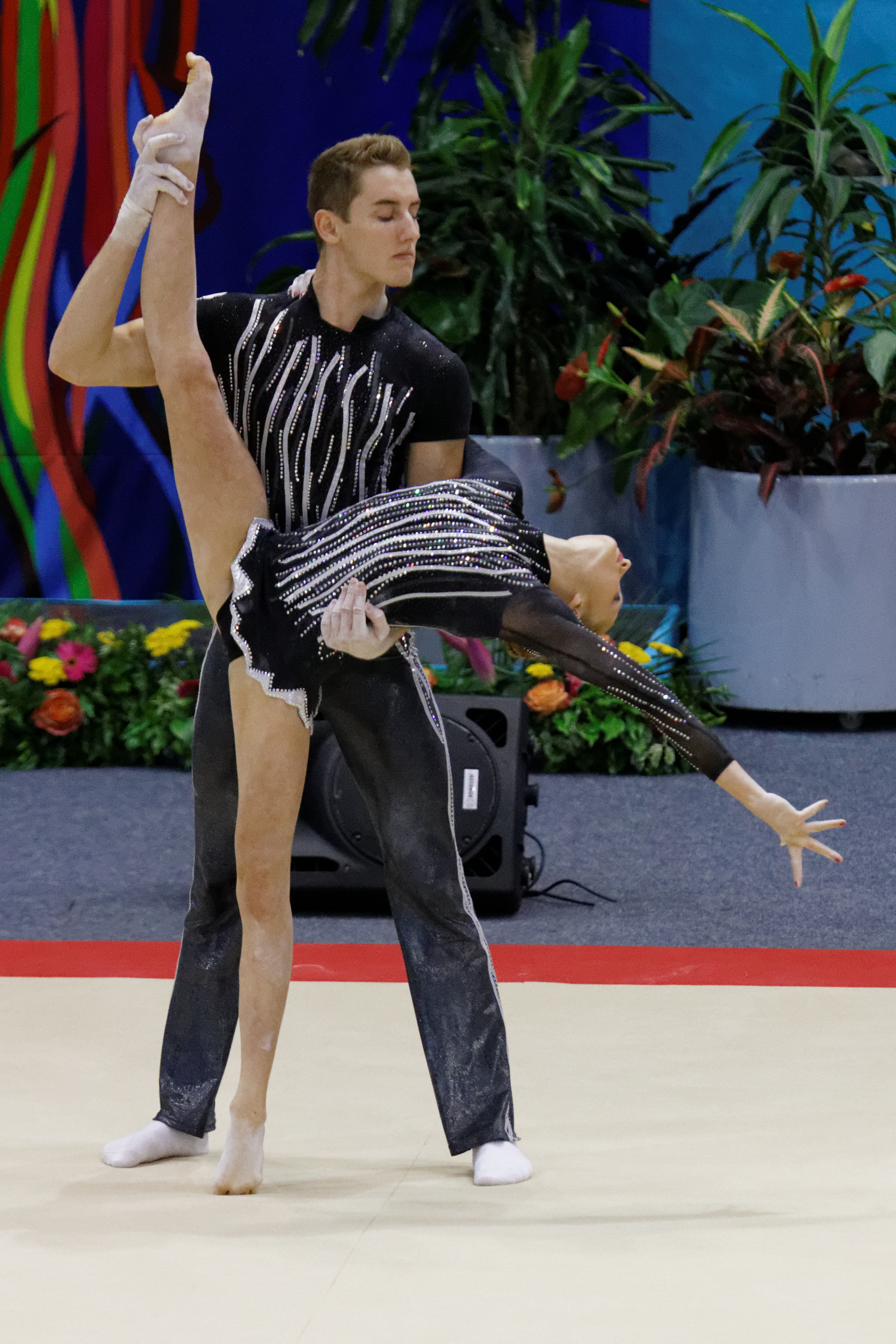
- Alexis Martin and Camille Curti at the 2014 Acrobatic Gymnastics World Championships

Personal information
- Born: May 14, 1994 (age 32)

Gymnastics career
- Discipline: Acrobatic gymnastics
- Country represented: France
- Club: Bois-Colombes Trampoline
- Head coaches: Margo Bardy, Eva Mauriceau
- Choreographer: Mélanie Avisse, Monique Hagard, Karine Lemêtre

Alexis Martin (born May 14, 1994) is a French male acrobatic gymnast. With partner Camille Curti, Martin achieved 7th at the 2014 Acrobatic Gymnastics World Championships. With partner Chloe Gherardi, Martin came 6th at the 2016 Acrobatic Gymnastics World Championships.

He began his gymnastics career early, originally with his father as coach.

Following his gymnastics career, he founded the company Seïros.
