= Dominic Smith (gymnast) =

British acrobatic gymnast (born 1993)

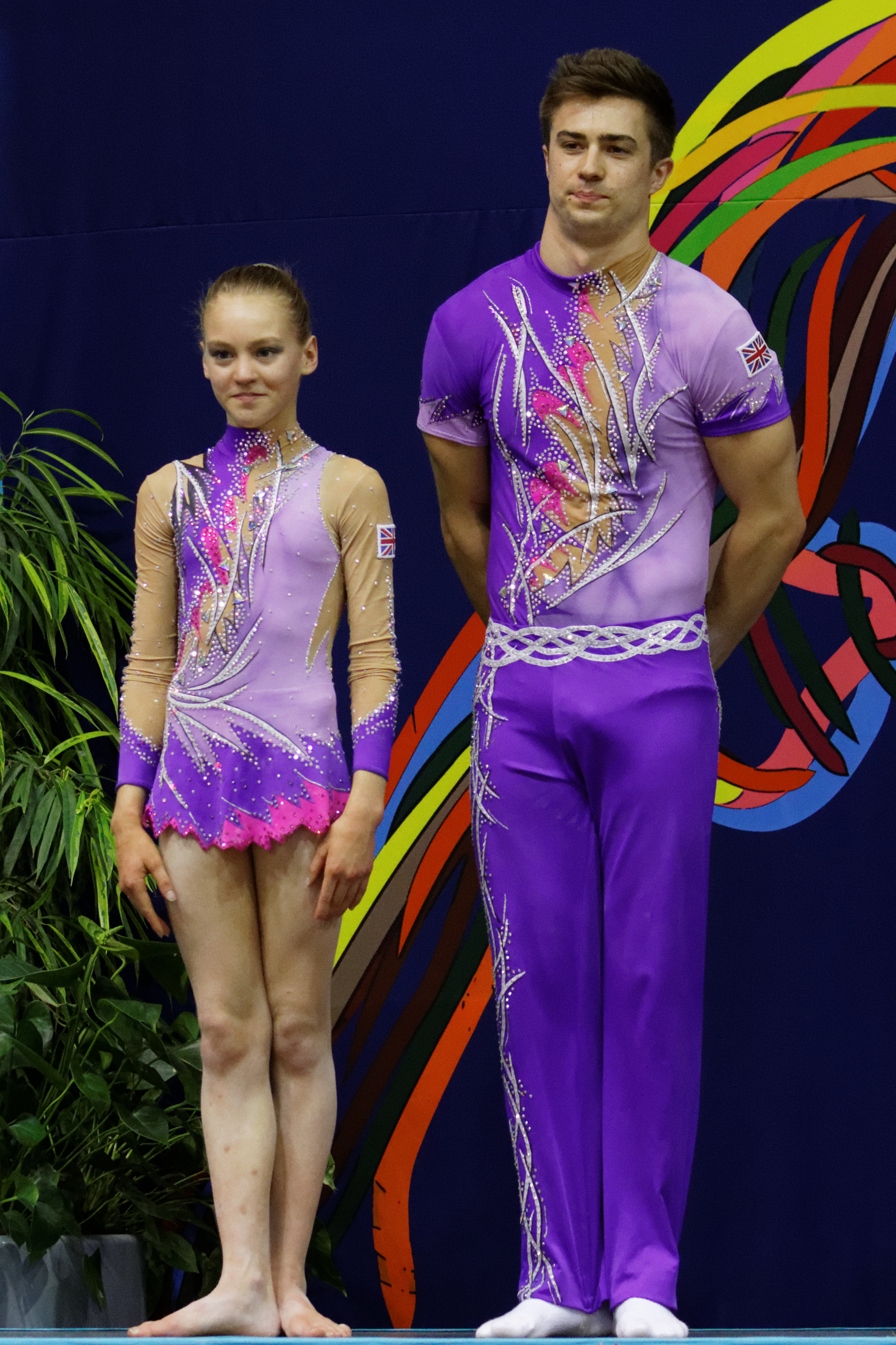
- Dominic Smith and Alice Upcott at the 2014 Acrobatic Gymnastics World Championships.

Personal information
- Born: 23 August 1993 (age 33)

Gymnastics career
- Discipline: Acrobatic gymnastics
- Country represented: Great Britain
- Club: Heathrow Gym Club
Medal record
Acrobatic gymnastics
Representing Great Britain
World Games
Gold medal – first place	2013 Cali	Mixed pair
World Championships
Silver medal – second place	2014 Levallois-Perret	Mixed pair
European Championships
Gold medal – first place	2013 Odivelas	Mixed pair

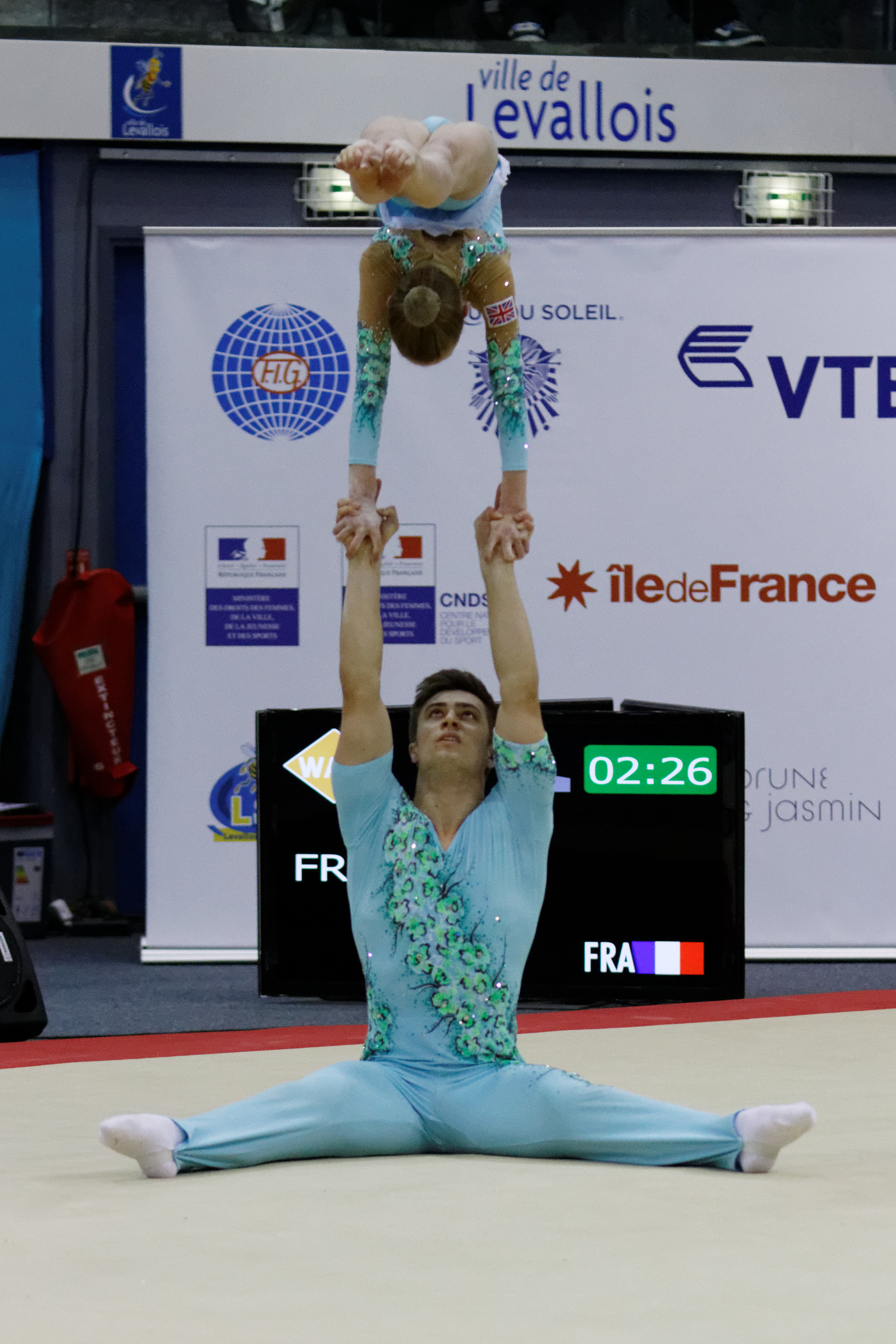
Dominic Smith and Alice Upcott at the 2014 Acrobatic Gymnastics World Championships.

Dominic Smith (born 23 August 1993) is a British male acrobatic gymnast. With Alice Upcott, he was awarded the gold medal in the 2013 World Games, the gold medal at the 2013 Acrobatic Gymnastics European Championships and the silver medal in the 2014 Acrobatic Gymnastics World Championships.

Since June 2012, Smith is a member of Spelbound, the gymnastic group who rose to fame in 2010, winning the fourth series of Britain's Got Talent. The prize was £100,000 and the opportunity to appear at the 2010 Royal Variety Performance.
