= Marie Annonson =

American acrobatic gymnast

- Born: October 8, 1984 (age 41)

Gymnastics career
- Discipline: Acrobatic gymnastics
- Country represented: United States
- Gym: West Coast Training Center (owner)

Marie Annonson is a retired elite acrobatic gymnast who currently owns the acrobatic gymnastics facility WestCoast Training Center (WCTC) in Livermore, California.

== Athletic career ==
During her acrobatic gymnastics career, Annonson competed nationally and internationally as the base of a women's pair with top Brittany Horrell on California Acrosports Team (CATs) in Sacramento, California with her coach Tonya Case.

In April 2000, Annonson and Horrell took fifth place in the junior division of the Flanders Acro Trophy in Deinze, Belgium.

At the 2001 Azur Acro Cup in Antibes, France during April, Annonson and Horrell placed third all-around (49.150).

In 2002, they competed at the Machuga Cup in Krasnodar, Russia, winning the silver medal right under the reigning Russian world champions. Later on that year, they won the gold at the Winterthur Cup sports acrobatics competition in Winterthur, Switzerland.

The women's pair participated in the first Sports Acrobatics World Age Group Games during November 2001 in Zielona Góra, Poland, where they placed eighth in the all-around.

The pair won the all-around title at the 2002 U.S. National Championships in New Orleans, Louisiana, also winning the 2002 Best Choreography Award for their notable "doll routine".

They also competed at the 2002 Sports Acrobatic World Age Group Games in Riesa, Germany, where they placed sixth in the preliminary round.

== Coaching career ==
Annonson retired from competition and began coaching in 2003.

Among the athletes she has coached are Kristin Allen and Michael Rodrigues, who won the mixed-pair all-around gold medal at the 2009 World Games in Kaohsiung, Taiwan, the first ever gold medal won for the United States in acrobatic gymnastics at a World Games event. In 2010, Annonson also coached Allen and Rodrigues to win the mixed-pair all-around gold medal at the 2010 Acrobatic Gymnastics World Championships in Wroclaw, Poland, the second gold medal ever won for the US in acrobatics at a World Championships.

WCTC athletes include the 2011 U.S. mixed-pairs champions, Cassie Lim and Brian Kincher. Lim and Kincher also won the mixed-pair gold in the all-around at the 2011 Flanders International Acro Cup in Puurs, Belgium.

In 2009, 2010 and 2011, Annonson was named Coach of the Year by USA Gymnastics.

The members of the 2011 U.S. Acrobatic Gymnastics National Team members who trained at WCTC include U.S. Junior National Mixed Pair Champions Ani Smith and Jake Kanavel and the junior women's group of Haley Douglas, Samantha Mihalic and Nicole Potepa. In 2008, 10 out of 20 athletes attending the World Age Group Championships from the USA were from WCTC. Members of the 2010 U.S. junior national team that trained at WCTC include Smith, Kanavel, and the women's group of Cassandra Lim, Alyssa Gardner and Katie Slater. At the 2012 World Championships in Florida, Annonson attended as the official Head Coach for the USA Delegation. In 2014, she had 8 National Team members on the USA World Age Group delegation and 2 National Team members on the World Championship delegation. Between 2016 and 2020, WCTC continued to train USA National team members. From 2019 to 2022, WCTC's women's group of Cassidy Cu, Victoria Blante and Eily Corbett joined the Senior National Team. In 2023, WCTC's Cassidy Cu and Jaylen Ivey are current Senior National team members.

After attending the 2016 World Championships with her 13-19 women's group of Morgan Sweeney, Sophie Gruszka, and Amanda Waterson, Annonson shifted from full-time Head Coach of WestCoast Training Center to focus solely on running the business portion of WCTC. Michael Rodrigues, her former World Champion, took over as Head Coach and continues that position currently. Annonson returned to coaching with Rodrigues and her other team coaches in 2019 however, Michael Rodrigues remains the head coach of WestCoast Training Center. Rodrigues has continued producing elite-level athletes for WCTC winning bronze at the 2013 World Cup with women's group Sweeney, Gruszka and Waterson. Most notably the WCTC women's group of Cassidy Cu, Victoria Blante and Eily Corbett won both an All-Around bronze medal, and a gold medal in the Balance category at the 2022 Senior World Championships in Baku, Azerbaijan.

Within each program at USA Gymnastics, the federation recognizes coaches that have received the highest level of coaching distinction. This title is called the Master of Sport. Annonson was added to this honorary list in 2014. Along with that recognition, her athletes Kristin Allen and Michael Rodrigues were also inducted into the USA Gymnastics Hall of Fame, Class of 2015.

Annonson participated in the FIG Coaching Academy Level 1 in Lisbon, Portugal in 2009, Level 2 in Ghent, Belgium in 2015, and the final Academy Level 3 in Aalen, Germany in 2022. She passed Level 3 with the highest marks along with 4 other peers earning her FIG Coaching Brevet.

In 2017, Annonson started her judging career by attending the FIG International Judges course in Indianapolis, Indiana earning her FIG Judging Brevet Category 4. She then passed up to Category 3 in 2023 at the same course in Lausanne, Switzerland. Annonson has judged at international acrobatic gymnastics competitions in Switzerland (2019), (Belgium (2019), and Portugal (2020). With her most notable judging roles being at the Acrobatic Gymnastics World Age Group Championships in Geneva, Switzerland in 2021, and again in Baku, Azerbaijan in 2022. She is also currently a USA Nationally Rated Judge.

Other contributions Annonson has made to Acrobatic Gymnastics is her participation in the Introductory Acrobatic Gymnastics course created and led by her former coach, Tonya Case. This course was created by Case while she was the Acrobatic Gymnastics FIG Technical Committee President to grow Acrobatic Gymnastics in multiple countries interested in the sport. Annonson helped create the 4-day curriculum course and has taught the course in Venezuela (2010), Bolivia (2011), Mozambique - Africa (2012), Mexico (2013 & 2018), Guatemala (2018), & Trinidad & Tobago (2018).

Annonson started choreographing acrobatic routines in 2002 and has been doing choreography for both her team and other clubs across the USA since. Her choreography has contributed to many team USA medals including choreographing the routines that won Cu, Blante and Corbett the bronze and gold medals at the 2022 Senior World Championships in Baku, Azerbaijan. Annonson has also choreographed the National Elite Routine in 2017 & 2018 at the Acrobatic Gymnastics National Championships.

Currently, Annonson is focusing on WestCoast Training Center, her acrobatic gymnastics business in Livermore, California. She often travels to teach multi-level acrobatic courses, choreograph acrobatic routines nationally, judge acrobatic competitions and other various positions such as being a member of the Las Vegas World Cup Organizing Committee. Annonson and WCTC hosts regional championships ever year and she also assists running competitions such as the Pan American Championships in Bogota, Colombia in 2022.
