= Powerlifting at the 2009 World Games =

- Venue: National Sun Yat-sen University, Sun Yat-San Hall
- Dates: 25–26 July 2009
- Competitors: 79 from 21 nations

The powerlifting events at the 2009 World Games in Kaohsiung, Taiwan was played between 25 and 26 July. 79 athletes, from 21 nations, participated in the tournament. The powerlifting competition took place at National Sun Yat-sen University.

== Participating nations ==
- Australia (2)
- Brazil (1)
- Canada (2)
- Chinese Taipei (13)
- Czech Republic (1)
- Ecuador (1)
- Finland (3)
- France (4)
- Germany (2)
- Indonesia (2)
- Italy (1)
- Japan (7)
- Luxembourg (1)
- Netherlands (3)
- Norway (3)
- Philippines (1)
- Poland (4)
- South Africa (2)
- Ukraine (12)
- United States (12)
- Venezuela (2)

== Medal table ==
Rank	Nation	Gold	Silver	Bronze	Total
1	Ukraine	3	4	2	9
2	Chinese Taipei	2	0	1	3
3	Poland	1	1	1	3
3	United States	1	1	1	3
5	Indonesia	1	0	1	2
6	Italy	0	1	0	1
6	Japan	0	1	0	1
8	France	0	0	1	1
8	Luxembourg	0	0	1	1
Totals (9 entries)		8	8	8	24

== Events ==
=== Men's events ===
Event	Gold	Silver	Bronze
Lightweight	Hsieh Tsung-ting; Chinese Taipei	Arkadiy Shalokha; Ukraine	Hassan El-Belghitti; France
Middleweight	Jarosław Olech; Poland	Andriy Naniev; Ukraine	Jan Wegiera; Poland
Heavyweight	Sergiy Pevnev; Ukraine	Jacek Wiak; Poland	Anibal Coimbra; Luxembourg
Super heavyweight	Mike Tuchscherer; United States	Oleksandr Shepel; Ukraine	Valeriy Karpov; Ukraine

=== Women's events ===
Event	Gold	Silver	Bronze
Lightweight	Chen Wei-ling; Chinese Taipei	Yukako Fukushima; Japan	Sri Hartati; Indonesia
Middleweight	Noviana Sari; Indonesia	Tetyana Prymenchuk; Ukraine	Zhanna Ivanova; Ukraine
Heavyweight	Larysa Soloviova; Ukraine	Antonietta Orsini; Italy	Priscilla Ribic; United States
Super heavyweight	Iryna Yavorska; Ukraine	Jessica O'Donnell; United States	Chang Ya-wen; Chinese Taipei
