= Finswimming at the World Games =

Trend sport at the World Games

Finswimming has featured as a trend sport at the World Games since the inaugural 1981 World Games held in Santa Clara, California.

== Organization of World Games competition ==
Participation is reserved for the best swimmers and the best relay teams. Confédération Mondiale des Activités Subaquatiques (CMAS), the international federation responsible for finswimming, selects participants on the basis of the CMAS World Ranking which is a listing of the best performing senior and junior men and women from the most recent Finswimming World Championships and the rounds of the annual World Cup. The eight best qualifying swimmers in the CMAS World Ranking are obligated to compete while other swimmers will be invited to participate. The final selection of swimmers is the responsibility of the CMAS Finswimming Commission with agreement from the CMAS Board of Directors. Each invited national federation may field no more than two swimmers per race and one relay team. A place in the relay is available for the World Games host if it chooses to field a team.

As of November 2013, the program consists of qualifying and final races held over two days for the following techniques and distances for senior men and women:

- Apnoea swimming (AP) - 50m,
- Surface swimming (SF) - 100m, 200m, 400m and the 4 × 100 m relay.

== Medalists ==
=== Men ===
==== 50m surface ====
Games	Gold	Silver	Bronze
1997 Lahti	Aleksandr Nechitaylo (RUS)	Andrea Mangherini (ITA)	Sergey Achapov (RUS)

==== 100m surface ====
Games	Gold	Silver	Bronze
1981 Santa Clara	Jürgen Kolenda (FRG)	Sandro Sola (ITA)	Giuseppe Galantucci (ITA)
1985 London	Jürgen Kolenda (FRG)	Fabio Bettazzoni (ITA)	Christian Molenaar (FRG)
1989 Karlsruhe	Sergey Achapov (URS)	Konstantin Kudriyayev (URS)	Robert Giors (HUN)
1993 The Hague	Luca Tonelli (ITA)	David Landi (ITA)	Sami Somi (FIN)
1997 Lahti	Aleksandr Nechitaylo (RUS)	Sergey Achapov (RUS)	Li Yong (CHN)
2001 Akita	Yevgeniy Skorzhenko (RUS)	Sergey Achapov (RUS)	Huang Jiandong (CHN)
2005 Duisburg	Andrey Burakov (RUS)	Yuan Haifeng (CHN)	Aleksandr Panyutin (RUS)
2009 Kaohsiung	Miao Jingwei (CHN)	Dmitro Sydorenko (UKR)	Andrea Nava (ITA)
2013 Cali	Cesare Fumarola (ITA)	Pavel Kabanov (RUS)	Alexandre Noir (FRA)
2017 Wrocław	Dmitry Zhurman (RUS)	Max Poschart (GER)	Pavel Kabanov (RUS)
2022 Birmingham	Max Poschart (GER)	Filip Strikinac (CRO)	Anastasios Mylonakis (GRE)
2025 Chengdu	Max Poschart (GER)	Justus Mörstedt (GER)	Tarek Hassan El-Sayed (EGY)

==== 200m surface ====
Games	Gold	Silver	Bronze
1981 Santa Clara	Jürgen Kolenda (FRG)	Valter Olander (SWE)	Sandro Sola (ITA)
1985 London	Jürgen Kolenda (FRG)	Giuseppe Galantucci (ITA)	Fabio Bettazzoni (ITA)
1989 Karlsruhe	Sergey Achapov (URS)	Konstantin Kudriyayev (URS)	Christian Molenaar (FRG)
1993 The Hague	Luca Tonelli (ITA)	Stephan Part (AUT)	Sven Gallasch (GER)
1997 Lahti	Aleksandr Nechitaylo (RUS)	Sergey Achapov (RUS)	Luca Tonelli (ITA)
2001 Akita	Sergey Achapov (RUS)	Andreas Utzmeir (GER)	Ilya Somov (RUS)
2005 Duisburg	Pavel Kabanov (RUS)	Nikolay Reznikov (RUS)	Viktor Panev (UKR)
2009 Kaohsiung	Stefano Figini (ITA)	Andrea Nava (ITA)	You Gyeong-Heon (KOR)
2013 Cali	Max Lauschus (GER)	Stefano Figini (ITA)	Dmitry Kokorev (RUS)
2017 Wrocław	Dmitry Zhurman (RUS)	Max Poschart (GER)	Dmitry Kokorev (RUS)
2022 Birmingham	Max Poschart (GER)	Alex Mozsár (HUN)	Ádám Bukor (HUN)
2025 Chengdu	Nándor Kiss (HUN)	Justus Mörstedt (GER)	Juan Ocampo (COL)

==== 400m surface ====
Games	Gold	Silver	Bronze
1981 Santa Clara	Giuseppe Galantucci (ITA)	Valter Olander (SWE)	Paolo Vandini (ITA)
1985 London	Jürgen Kolenda (FRG)	Valter Olander (SWE)	Carsten Bertram (FRG)
1989 Karlsruhe	Konstantin Kudriyayev (URS)	Sergey Achapov (URS)	Frederico Ruggeri (ITA)
1993 The Hague	Edwin Kanters (NED)	Martin Bočinský (CZE)	Anders Thomsen (DEN)
1997 Lahti	Norbert Savanya (HUN)	Hu Hailong (CHN)	Sergey Dokuchayev (RUS)
2001 Akita	Sven Gallasch (GER)	Gergely Juhos (HUN)	Ilya Somov (RUS)
2005 Duisburg	Nikolay Reznikov (RUS)	Ioannis Tsourounakis (GRE)	Lorenzo Minisola (ITA)
2009 Kaohsiung	Stefano Figini (ITA)	Sven Lutzkendorf (GER)	Denes Kanyo (HUN)
2013 Cali	Max Lauschus (GER)	Evgeny Smirnov (RUS)	Stefano Figini (ITA)
2017 Wrocław	Dénes Kanyó (HUN)	Max Lauschus (GER)	Davide De Ceglie (ITA)
2022 Birmingham	Alex Mozsár (HUN)	Yoon Young-joong (KOR)	Ádám Bukor (HUN)
2025 Chengdu	Nándor Kiss (HUN)	Oleksii Zakharov (UKR)	Alex Mozsár (HUN)

==== 800m surface ====
Games	Gold	Silver	Bronze
1985 London	Paolo Vandini (ITA)	Valter Olander (SWE)	Sylvain Florio (FRA)

==== 1500m surface ====
Games	Gold	Silver	Bronze
1981 Santa Clara	Paolo Vandini (ITA)	Giuseppe Galantucci (ITA)	Valter Olander (SWE)
1985 London	Paolo Vandini (ITA)	Valter Olander (SWE)	István Kubina (HUN)

==== 4x50m relay ====
Games	Gold	Silver	Bronze
2022 Birmingham	Colombia (COL); Juan Rodríguez; Juan Duque; Mauricio Fernández; Juan Ocampo	China (CHN); Zhang Siqian; Shan Yongan; Wang Zhihao; Tong Zhenbo	Germany (GER); Justus Mörstedt; Malte Striegler; Robert Golenia; Max Poschart
2025 Chengdu	Germany (GER); Max Poschart; Niklas Loßner; Justus Mörstedt; Marek Leipold	Ukraine (UKR); Serhii Smishchenko; Oleksandr Kuzmenko; Davyd Yelisieiev; Oleksii Zakharov	Colombia (COL); Juan Rodríguez; Juan Duque; Mauricio Fernández; Juan Ocampo

==== 4x100m relay ====
Games	Gold	Silver	Bronze
1985 London	West Germany (FRG)	Italy (ITA)	France (FRA)
1989 Karlsruhe	Soviet Union (URS)	West Germany (FRG)	China (CHN)
1993 The Hague	Italy (ITA)	Finland (FIN)	Denmark (DEN)
1997 Lahti	Russia (RUS); Sergey Achapov; Sergey Dokuchayev; Maksim Maksimov; Aleksandr Nechitaylo	China (CHN); Hu Hailong; Li Yong; Liu Quirong; Zhao Ji	Italy (ITA); Luca Guarnaschelli; Rubes Levada; Andrea Mangherini; Luca Tonelli
2001 Akita	Russia (RUS); Ilya Somov; Yevgeniy Skorzhenko; Maksim Maksimov; Sergey Achapov	China (CHN); Zhao Ji; Hu Hailong; Huang Jiandong; Li Yong	Germany (GER); Frank Wille; Sven Kaiser; Sven Gallasch; Andreas Utzmeir
2005 Duisburg	Russia (RUS); Andrey Burakov; Yevgeniy Skorzhenko; Aleksandr Panyutin; Pavel Kabanov	Ukraine (UKR); Dmitro Sydorenko; Viktor Panev; Dmitriy Artemchuk; Igor Soroka	Italy (ITA); Riccardo Galli; Lorenzo Minisola; Cesare Fumarola; Andrea Nava
2009 Kaohsiung	Ukraine (UKR); Viktor Panev; Dmitriy Shekera; Igor Soroka; Dmitro Sydorenko	Italy (ITA); Stefano Figini; Cesare Fumarola; Gianluca Mancini; Andrea Nava	Russia (RUS); Andrey Burakov; Pavel Kulakov; Nikolay Reznikov; Yevgeniy Skorzhenko
2013 Cali	Russia (RUS); Pavel Kabanov; Aleksey Kazantsev; Andrey Barabash; Dmitry Kokorev	Colombia (COL); Juan David Duque Jimenez; Mauricio Fernandez Castillo; Juan Fernando Ocampo Lozada; Leonidas Juan Pablo Romero Rivera	Ukraine (UKR); Denys Grubnik; Oleksandr Konkov; Evgen Stepanchuk; Dmitro Sydorenko
2017 Wrocław	Russia (RUS); Pavel Kabanov; Aleksey Kazantsev; Dmitry Kokorev; Dmitry Zhurman	Italy (ITA); Kevin Zanardi; Andrea Nava; Stefano Figini; Cesare Fumarola	Germany (GER); Max Lauschus; Max Poschart; Florian Kritzler; Malte Striegler
2022 Birmingham	Germany (GER); Robert Golenia; Malte Striegler; Justus Mörstedt; Max Poschart	Colombia (COL); Juan Rodríguez; Juan Duque; Mauricio Fernández; Juan Ocampo	China (CHN); Wang Zhihao; Tong Zhenbo; Zhang Siqian; Shan Yongan
2025 Chengdu	Germany (GER); Niklas Loßner; Justus Mörstedt; Marek Leipold; Max Poschart	Ukraine (UKR); Serhii Smishchenko; Oleksandr Kuzmenko; Davyd Yelisieiev; Oleksii Zakharov	South Korea (KOR); Shin Myeong-jun; Lee Dong-jin; Jang Hyoung-ho; Kwon Nam-ho

==== 4x200m relay ====
Games	Gold	Silver	Bronze
1985 London	West Germany (FRG)	France (FRA)	Sweden (SWE)
1989 Karlsruhe	Soviet Union (URS)	West Germany (FRG)	Hungary (HUN)
1993 The Hague	Denmark (DEN)	Finland (FIN)	Czech Republic (CZE)
1997 Lahti	Russia (RUS); Sergey Achapov; Sergey Dokuchayev; Maksim Maksimov; Aleksandr Nechitaylo	Hungary (HUN); Peter Balazs; Gergely Juhos; Nenes Kayo; Norbert Savanya	Italy (ITA); Luca Guarnaschelli; Rubes Levada; Andrea Mangherini; Luca Tonelli

==== 50m apnoea ====
Games	Gold	Silver	Bronze
1981 Santa Clara	Jürgen Kolenda (FRG)	Sandro Sola (ITA)	Dario Broglia (ITA)
1985 London	Jürgen Kolenda (FRG)	Christian Molenaar (FRG)	Fabio Bettazzoni (ITA)
1989 Karlsruhe	Oleg Ananyev (URS)	Gennadiy Syssoyev (URS)	Dierk Kraft (FRG)
1993 The Hague	David Landi (ITA)	Ari Palve (FIN)	Sami Somi (FIN)
1997 Lahti	Li Yong (CHN)	Liu Quirong (CHN)	Sergey Dokuchayev (RUS)
2001 Akita	Yevgeniy Skorzhenko (RUS)	Li Yong (CHN)	Zhao Ji (CHN)
2005 Duisburg	Yevgeniy Skorzhenko (RUS)	Nikolai Tover (EST)	Igor Soroka (UKR)
2009 Kaohsiung	Igor Soroka (UKR)	Yevgeniy Skorzhenko (RUS)	Lee Kwan-Ho (KOR)
2013 Cali	Kim Tae-Kyun (KOR)	Pavel Kabanov (RUS)	Mauricio Fernandez Castillo (COL)
2017 Wrocław	Pavel Kabanov (RUS)	Mauricio Fernandez Castillo (COL)	Lee Dong-jin (KOR)
2022 Birmingham	Zhang Siqian (CHN)	Tong Zhenbo (CHN)	Kim Chan-yeong (KOR)
2025 Chengdu	Shin Myeong-jun (KOR)	Max Poschart (GER)	Zhang Siqian (CHN)

==== 100m immersion ====
Games	Gold	Silver	Bronze
1981 Santa Clara	Jürgen Kolenda (FRG)	Dario Broglia (ITA)	Thierry Lasbleye (FRA)
1985 London	Jürgen Kolenda (FRG)	Fabio Bettazzoni (ITA)	Gyula Gurisatti (HUN)
1989 Karlsruhe	Jun Liang (TPE)	Oleg Ananyev (URS)	Gennadiy Syssoyev (FRG)
1993 The Hague	Ari Palve (FIN)	Sami Somi (FIN)	Sven Gallasch (GER)
1997 Lahti	Li Yong (CHN)	Liu Quirong (CHN)	Sergey Dokuchayev (RUS)

==== 400m immersion ====
Games	Gold	Silver	Bronze
1985 London	Frank Clemens (FRG)	Sylvain Florio (ITA)	Gyula Gurisatti (HUN)

==== 50m bi-fins ====
Games	Gold	Silver	Bronze
2017 Wrocław	Andrey Arbuzov (RUS)	Jacub Jarolim (CZE)	Dmitry Gavrilov (BLR)
2022 Birmingham	Szymon Kropidłowski (POL)	Stylianos Chatziiliadis (GRE)	Christos Bonias (GRE)
2025 Chengdu	Szebasztián Szabó (HUN)	Szymon Kropidłowski (POL)	Marco Orsi (ITA)
2025 Chengdu	Szebasztián Szabó (HUN)	Szymon Kropidłowski (POL)	Artur Artamonov (UKR)

==== 100m bi-fins ====
Games	Gold	Silver	Bronze
2017 Wrocław	Dmitry Gavrilov (BLR)	Gergő Kosina (HUN)	Jacub Jarolim (CZE)
2022 Birmingham	Péter Holoda (HUN)	Szymon Kropidłowski (POL)	Christos Bonias (GRE)
2025 Chengdu	Szymon Kropidłowski (POL)	Szebasztián Szabó (HUN)	Aleksei Fedkin (AIN)

=== Women ===
==== 50m surface ====
Games	Gold	Silver	Bronze
1997 Lahti	Li Shaozhen (CHN)	Svetlana Gancha (RUS)	Wu Xiaohui (CHN)

==== 100m surface ====
Games	Gold	Silver	Bronze
1981 Santa Clara	Anne Menguy (FRA)	Cristina Covoni (ITA)	Anne-Marie Rouchon (FRA)
1985 London	Anne-Marie Rouchon (FRA)	Barbara Nanni (ITA)	Eva Fabo (HUN)
1989 Karlsruhe	Larissa Butenko (URS)	Xie Fang (CHN)	Tatyana Melnikova (URS)
1993 The Hague	Lorena Baldi (ITA)	Kristiina Nurk (EST)	Beata Bömisch (HUN)
1997 Lahti	Wu Xiaohui (CHN)	Li Shaozhen (CHN)	Svetlana Gancha (RUS)
2001 Akita	Liu Qi (CHN)	Tatyana Komarova (RUS)	Zhu Baozhen (CHN)
2005 Duisburg	Zhu Baozhen (CHN)	Vasilisa Kravchuk (RUS)	Liu Qi (CHN)
2009 Kaohsiung	Zhu Baozhen (CHN)	Liang Yaoyue (CHN)	Camille Heitz (FRA) Choi Sae-Rom (KOR)
2013 Cali	Lilla Székely (HUN)	Margaryta Artiushenko (UKR)	Grace Fernandez Castillo (COL)
2017 Wrocław	Ekaterina Mikhaylushkina (RUS)	Shu Chengjing (CHN)	Anna Ber (RUS)
2022 Birmingham	Shu Chengjing (CHN)	Xu Yichuan (CHN)	Grace Fernández (COL)

==== 200m surface ====
Games	Gold	Silver	Bronze
1981 Santa Clara	Anne-Marie Rouchon (FRA)	Anne Menguy (FRA)	Marion Collot (FRA)
1985 London	Eva Fabo (HUN)	Monica Crovetti (ITA)	Barbara Nanni (ITA)
1989 Karlsruhe	Tatyana Melnikova (URS)	Yelena Sadovik (URS)	Eva Fabo (HUN)
1993 The Hague	Kristiina Nurk (EST)	Marika Themeli (SWE)	Zsuzsa Csik (HUN)
1997 Lahti	Wu Xiaohui (CHN)	Wang Yan (CHN)	Natalya Musychenko (RUS)
2001 Akita	Anastasiya Glukhikh (RUS)	Lidiya Goryacheva (RUS)	Suzanne Jentzsch (GER)
2005 Duisburg	Vasilisa Kravchuk (RUS)	Valentina Artemeva (RUS)	Liu Qi (CHN)
2009 Kaohsiung	Vasilisa Kravchuk (RUS)	Valeriya Baranovskaya (RUS)	Olga Shlyakhovska (UKR)
2013 Cali	Valeriya Baranovskaya (RUS)	Vasilisa Kravchuk (RUS)	Yana Trofymez (UKR)
2017 Wrocław	Valeriya Baranovskaya (RUS)	Ekaterina Mikhaylushkina (RUS)	Anastasiia Antoniak (UKR)
2022 Birmingham	Sofiia Hrechko (UKR)	Dora Bassi (CRO)	Csilla Károlyi (HUN)

==== 400m surface ====
Games	Gold	Silver	Bronze
1981 Santa Clara	Anne-Marie Rouchon (FRA)	Monica Crovetti (ITA)	Marina Beck (FRG)
1985 London	Eva Fabo (HUN)	Edit Ginczinger (HUN)	Monica Crovetti (ITA)
1989 Karlsruhe	Tatyana Melnikova (URS)	Eva Fabo (HUN)	Yelena Sadovik (URS)
1993 The Hague	Myriam Villette (FRA)	Kristiina Nurk (EST)	Marika Themeli (SWE)
1997 Lahti	Wang Yan (CHN)	Beata Bozso (HUN)	Oksana Koroleva (RUS)
2001 Akita	Yelena Gracheva (RUS)	Anastasiya Glukhikh (RUS)	Bettina Müller (GER)
2005 Duisburg	Chen Xiaoping (CHN)	Yekaterina Politko (RUS)	Carolin Stut (GER)
2009 Kaohsiung	Vasilisa Kravchuk (RUS)	Liu Jiao (CHN)	Olga Shlyakhovska (UKR)
2013 Cali	Vasilisa Kravchuk (RUS)	Yana Trofymez (UKR)	Kim Bo-Kyung (KOR)
2017 Wrocław	Sun Yiting (CHN)	Kim Bo-kyung (KOR)	Anastasiia Antoniak (UKR)
2022 Birmingham	Johanna Schikora (GER)	Sofiia Hrechko (UKR)	Anastasiia Antoniak (UKR)

==== 800m surface ====
Games	Gold	Silver	Bronze
1981 Santa Clara	Anne-Marie Rouchon (FRA)	Marion Collot (FRA)	Monica Crovetti (ITA)
1985 London	Monica Crovetti (ITA)	Eva Fabo (HUN)	Edit Ginczinger (HUN)

==== 4x50m relay ====
Games	Gold	Silver	Bronze
2022 Birmingham	China (CHN); Shu Chengjing; Hu Yaoyao; Chen Sijia; Xu Yichuan	Colombia (COL); Paula Alejandra Aguirre Joya; Diana Moreno; Viviana Retamozo Olaya; Grace Fernandez Castillo	South Korea (KOR); Moon Ye-jin; Kim Min-jeong; Jang Ye-sol; Seo Ui-jin

==== 4x100m relay ====
Games	Gold	Silver	Bronze
1989 Karlsruhe	Soviet Union (URS)	China (CHN)	Hungary (HUN)
1993 The Hague	Estonia (EST)	Hungary (HUN)	France (FRA)
1997 Lahti	China (CHN); Li Shaozhen; Wang Yan; Wu Xiaohui; Zhu Xia	Russia (RUS); Svetlana Gancha; Oksana Koroleva; Natalya Musychenko; Yuliya Chirikova	Hungary (HUN); Beata Bozso; Judi Revesz; Beata Bömisch; Villo Varga
2001 Akita	Russia (RUS); Tatyana Komarova; Lidiya Goryacheva; Irina Yegoruchkina; Anastasiya Kochneva	China (CHN); Zhu Baozhen; Li Qingping; Wu Xiaohui; Liu Qi	Germany (GER); Suzanne Jentzsch; Tina Hirschfeldt; Bettina Müller; Christine Müller
2005 Duisburg	Russia (RUS); Valentina Artemeva; Svetlana Dedyukh; Anastasiya Glukhikh; Vasilisa Kravchuk	China (CHN); Zhu Baozhen; Zhong Jiexia; Chen Xiaoping; Liu Qi	South Korea (KOR); Bae So-Hyun; Hong Hye-Sun; Jeon Ah-Ram; Kim Hyeon-Jin
2009 Kaohsiung	China (CHN); Li Jing; Liang Yaoyue; Xu Huanshan; Zhu Baozhen	South Korea (KOR); Choi Sae-Rom; Jang Ye-Sol; Jeon Ah-Ram; Kim Hyeon-Jin	Russia (RUS); Valeriya Baranovskaya; Medeya Dzhavakhishvili; Yana Kasimova; Vasilisa Kravchuk
2013 Cali	Russia (RUS); Valeriya Baranovskaya; Vera Ilyushina; Elena Kononova; Vasilisa Kravchuk	Ukraine (UKR); Anastasiia Antoniak; Margaryta Artiushenko; Olga Shlyakhovska; Yana Trofymez	China (CHN); Li Jing; Liang Yaoyue; Liu Jiao; Xu Yichuan
2017 Wrocław	Russia (RUS); Valeriya Baranovskaya; Anna Ber; Aleksandra Skurlatova; Ekaterina Mikhaylushkina	Colombia (COL); Grace Fernandez Castillo; Viviana Retamozo Olaya; Kelly Ximena Perez Rubio; Paula Alejandra Aguirre Joya	South Korea (KOR); Jang Ye-sol; Kim Eun-kyounge; Kim Ga-in; Kim Bo-kyung
2022 Birmingham	China (CHN); Shu Chengjing; Hu Yaoyao; Chen Sijia; Xu Yichuan	Hungary (HUN); Sára Suba; Petra Senánszky; Csilla Károlyi; Krisztina Varga	Colombia (COL); Grace Fernandez Castillo; Viviana Retamozo Olaya; Diana Moreno; Paula Alejandra Aguirre Joya

==== 4x200m relay ====
Games	Gold	Silver	Bronze
1989 Karlsruhe	Soviet Union (URS)	China (CHN)	Hungary (HUN)
1993 The Hague	Hungary (HUN)	Italy (ITA)	France (FRA)
1997 Lahti	China (CHN); Li Shaozhen; Wang Yan; Wu Xiaohui; Zhu Xia	Russia (RUS); Yuliya Chirikova; Svetlana Gancha; Oksana Koroleva; Natalya Musychenko	Hungary (HUN); Beata Bozso; Judi Revesz; Beata Bömisch; Villo Varga

==== 50m apnoea ====
Games	Gold	Silver	Bronze
1981 Santa Clara	Cristina Covoni (ITA)	Monica Crovetti (ITA)	Anne Menguy (FRA)
1985 London	Anne Gourmoux (FRA)	Katalin Toth (HUN)	Emanuela Imperatori (ITA)
1989 Karlsruhe	Larissa Butenko (URS)	Zheng Shiyu (CHN)	Svetlana Frolova (URS)
1993 The Hague	Zuzana Mandiková (CZE)	Lorena Baldi (ITA)	Beata Bömisch (HUN)
1997 Lahti	Li Shaozhen (CHN)	Zhu Xia (CHN)	Yuliya Chirikova (RUS)
2001 Akita	Anastasiya Kochneva (RUS)	Tatyana Komarova (RUS)	Zhu Baozhen (CHN)
2005 Duisburg	Anastasiya Glukhikh (RUS)	Zhu Baozhen (CHN)	Galija Sattarova (EST)
2009 Kaohsiung	Zhu Baozhen (CHN)	Xu Huanshan (CHN)	Yana Kasimova (RUS)
2013 Cali	Camille Heitz (FRA)	Xu Huanshan (CHN)	Margaryta Artiushenko (UKR)
2017 Wrocław	Jang Ye-sol (KOR)	Kim Ga-in (KOR)	Kateryna Dyelova (UKR)
2022 Birmingham	Hu Yaoyao (CHN)	Shu Chengjing (CHN)	Paula Aguirre (COL)

==== 100m immersion ====
Games	Gold	Silver	Bronze
1981 Santa Clara	Cristina Covoni (ITA)	Anne Menguy (FRA)	Marina Beck (FRG)
1985 London	Ildiko Magyar (HUN)	Katalin Tóth (HUN)	Emanuela Imperatori (ITA)
1989 Karlsruhe	Xie Fang (CHN)	Zheng Shiyu (CHN)	Svetlana Frolova (URS)
1993 The Hague	Myriam Villette (FRA)	Astrid Bernard (EST)	Céline Carel (FRA)
1997 Lahti	Li Shaozhen (CHN)	Svetlana Gancha (RUS)	Wu Xiaohui (CHN)

==== 400m immersion ====
Games	Gold	Silver	Bronze
1985 London	Katalin Toth (HUN)	Ildiko Magyar (HUN)	Pascale Schaederle (FRA)

==== 50m bi-fins ====
Games	Gold	Silver	Bronze
2017 Wrocław	Petra Senánszky (HUN)	Choi Min-ji (KOR)	Krisztina Varga (HUN)
2022 Birmingham	Petra Senánszky (HUN)	Choi Min-ji (KOR)	Krisztina Varga (HUN)

==== 100m bi-fins ====
Games	Gold	Silver	Bronze
2017 Wrocław	Petra Senánszky (HUN)	Krisztina Varga (HUN)	Iryna Pikiner (UKR)
2022 Birmingham	Petra Senánszky (HUN)	Krisztina Varga (HUN)	Zuzana Hrašková (SVK)

== Medal table ==
Rank	Nation	Gold	Silver	Bronze	Total
1	Russia (RUS)	31	18	17	66
2	China (CHN)	19	22	10	51
3	Italy (ITA)	15	19	20	54
4	West Germany (FRG)	12	5	7	24
5	Soviet Union (URS)	12	5	4	21
6	Hungary (HUN)	9	12	17	38
7	France (FRA)	7	5	10	22
8	Estonia (EST)	2	4	1	7
9	Ukraine (UKR)	2	2	8	12
10	Germany (GER)	1	5	8	14
11	South Korea (KOR)	1	4	6	11
12	Finland (FIN)	1	4	2	7
13	Czech Republic (CZE)	1	2	2	5
14	Denmark (DEN)	1	0	2	3
15	Belarus (BLR)	1	0	1	2
16	Chinese Taipei (TPE)	1	0	0	1
16	Netherlands (NED)	1	0	0	1
18	Sweden (SWE)	0	6	3	9
19	Colombia (COL)	0	2	0	2
20	Austria (AUT)	0	1	0	1
20	Greece (GRE)	0	1	0	1
Totals (21 entries)		117	117	118	352
