= Malaysia at the World Games =

- IOC code: MAS
- Medals Ranked 51st: Gold 5 Silver 3 Bronze 7 Total 15

World Games appearances (overview)
- 1981; 1985; 1989; 1993; 1997; 2001; 2005; 2009; 2013; 2017; 2022; 2025

Malaysia has participated in the 1981 World Games.

== Medal count ==
Games	Gold	Silver	Bronze	Total	Rank
(United States) Santa Clara 1981	0	0	0	0	-
(United Kingdom) London 1985	0	0	0	0	-
(Germany) Karlsruhe 1989	0	0	0	0	-
(Netherlands) The Hague 1993	0	1	0	1	42
(Finland) Lahti 1997	1	0	0	1	37
(Japan) Akita 2001	0	0	0	0	-
(Germany) Duisburg 2005	1	1	0	2	34
(Chinese Taipei) Kaohsiung 2009	1	0	3	4	30
(Colombia) Cali 2013	1	0	0	1	37
(Poland) Wroclaw 2017	0	0	1	1	57
(United States) Birmingham 2022	0	0	2	2	69
(China) Chengdu 2025	1	1	1	3	
Total	5	3	7	15	51

== Medals by sport ==
Sport	Gold	Silver	Bronze	Total
Squash	3	0	2	5
Bowling	1	2	3	6
Wushu	1	1	1	3
Water skiing	0	0	1	1
Totals (4 entries)	5	3	7	15

== Medalists ==
Medal	Name	Games	Sport	Event
Silver	Lisa Kwan	Den Haag 1993	Bowling	Women's singles
Gold	Sharon Low; Daniel Lim	Lahti 1997	Bowling	Mixed doubles
Gold	Nicol David	Duisburg 2005	Squash	Women's singles
Silver	Shalin Zulkifli; Zulmazran Zulkifli	Duisburg 2005	Bowling	Mixed doubles
Gold	Nicol David	Kaohsiung 2009	Squash	Women's singles
Bronze	Adrian Ang	Kaohsiung 2009	Bowling	Men's singles
Bronze	Adrian Ang; Zatil Iman Abdul Ghani	Kaohsiung 2009	Bowling	Mixed doubles
Bronze	Mohd Azlan Iskandar	Kaohsiung 2009	Squash	Men's singles
Gold	Nicol David	Cali 2013	Squash	Women's singles
Bronze	Nicol David	Wroclaw 2017	Squash	Women's singles
Bronze	Natasha Mohamed Roslan; Sin Li Jane	Birmingham 2022	Bowling	Women's doubles
Bronze	Aaliyah Yoong Hanifah	Birmingham 2022	Water skiing	Women's tricks
Gold	Tan Cheong Min	Chengdu 2025	Wushu	Women's nanquan/nandao combined
Silver	Pang Pui Yee	Chengdu 2025	Wushu	Women's chanquan/jianshu/qiangshu combined
Bronze	Sydney Chin Sy Xuan	Chengdu 2025	Wushu	Women's taijiquan/taijijian combined

=== Multiple medalists ===
Athlete	Sport	Years	Gender	1st place, gold medalist(s)	2nd place, silver medalist(s)	3rd place, bronze medalist(s)	Total
Nicol David	Squash	2005–2017	Women	3	0	1	4
Adrian Ang	Bowling	2009	Men	0	0	2	2

== See also ==
- Malaysia at the Olympics
- Malaysia at the Paralympics
- Malaysia at the Asian Games
- Malaysia at the Commonwealth Games
- Malaysia at the Universiade
