= Bowling at the 2009 World Games – Mixed doubles =

Bowling mixed doubles at the 2009 World Games
- Venue: Happy Bowling Alley
- Date: 20 July 2009
- Competitors: 46 from 23 nations

Medalists
1st place, gold medalist(s)		Kong Byoung-hee; Gye Min-young	South Korea
2nd place, silver medalist(s)		Manuel Otalora; Anggie Ramírez	Colombia
3rd place, bronze medalist(s)		Adrian Ang; Zatil Iman	Malaysia

The mixed doubles event in bowling at the 2009 World Games took place on 20 July 2009 at the Happy Bowling Alley.

== Competition format ==
A total of 23 pairs entered the competition. The best three duets from the preliminary round qualified to advance to the finals.

== Results ==
=== Preliminary ===
Rank	Athletes	Nation	Result	Note
1	Manuel Otalora; Anggie Ramírez	Colombia	2605	Q
2	Kong Byoung-hee; Gye Min-young	South Korea	2588	Q
3	Adrian Ang; Zatil Iman	Malaysia	2576	Q
4	Alejandro Cruz; Sandra Góngora	Mexico	2534	
5	Osku Palermaa; Krista Pöllänen	Finland	2518	
6	Chester King; Liza del Rosario	Philippines	2480	
7	Chris Barnes; Stefanie Nation	United States	2454	
8	Darron Cundy; Zara Glover	(United Kingdom) Great Britain	2445	
9	Remy Ong; Jennifer Tan	Singapore	2445	
10	Wu Siu Hong; Chan Shuk Han	Hong Kong	2429	
11	Fang Chin-nan; Wang Yu-ling	Chinese Taipei	2387	
12	Kunaksorn Sithipol; Poungthong Benchawan	Thailand	2382	
13	Achim Grabowski; Patricia Luoto	Germany	2345	
14	Tore Torgersen; Patcharin Torgersen	Norway	2312	
15	Jean-Marc Lebon; Katrien Goossens	Belgium	2312	
16	Thomas Gross; Ivonne Gross	Austria	2300	
17	Andres Herrera; Sofía Rodríguez	Guatemala	2279	
18	François Sacco; Isabelle Saldjian	France	2266	
19	Suguru Muroi; Saori Kanno	Japan	2246	
20	Luis Olivo; Patricia de Faria	Venezuela	2231	
21	Checo Simon; Aumi Guerra	Dominican Republic	2184	
22	Guy Caminsky; Gaye Mack	South Africa	2172	
23	Miguel Arevalo; Aida Granillo	El Salvador	2121	

=== Finals ===
Semifinal			Final
			1	(Colombia) Manuel Otalora (Colombia) Anggie Ramírez	710
3	(Malaysia) Adrian Ang (Malaysia) Zatil Iman	391	2	(South Korea) Kong Byoung-hee (South Korea) Gye Min-young	840
2	(South Korea) Kong Byoung-hee (South Korea) Gye Min-young	421
