= Bodybuilding at the 2009 World Games =

- Venue: Kaohsiung Cultural Center Jhihde Hall
- Dates: 18–19 July 2009
- Competitors: 40 from 17 nations

The bodybuilding events at the 2009 World Games in Kaohsiung occurred between 18 and 19 July. 40 athletes from 17 nations participated in the tournament. The bodybuilding competition took place in Kaohsiung Cultural Center Jhihde Hall. The competition included both men's and women's events among seven different weight categories. It was conducted by the International Federation of BodyBuilding & Fitness.

Ukraine topped the standings with three gold medals. On 26 October 2009 the IWGA announced that four male medal-winners were disqualified for doping violations, and their medals were stripped.

== Participating nations ==
- Brazil (2)
- Chinese Taipei (3)
- Czech Republic (1)
- Egypt (1)
- Estonia (2)
- Hungary (2)
- India (2)
- Japan (5)
- Lithuania (2)
- Poland (1)
- Qatar (1)
- South Africa (1)
- South Korea (3)
- Slovakia (4)
- Tanzania (1)
- Ukraine (6)
- Venezuela (3)

== Doping sanctions ==
On 26 October 2009, the IWGA announced sanctions against the following four competitors:

- Beila Balog, Ukraine, middleweight gold medalist, who tested positive for various anabolic steroids, diuretics and SERMs – disqualified, results at the 2009 World Games deleted from the records, stripped of medal and lifetime suspension from The World Games.
- Luiz-Carlos Sarmento, Brazil, light heavyweight silver medalist, who tested positive for various anabolic steroids, tamoxifen, SERMs and excess testosterone – disqualified, results at the 2009 World Games deleted from the records, stripped of medal and lifetime suspension from The World Games.
- Oleksandr Bilous, Ukraine, heavyweight gold medalist, who tested positive for various masking agents, diuretics and excess testosterone – disqualified, results at the 2009 World Games deleted from the records, stripped of medal and lifetime suspension from The World Games.
- Kamal Abdulsalam Abdulrahman, Qatar, heavyweight silver medalist, who tested positive for tamoxifen – disqualified, results at the 2009 World Games deleted from the records, and stripped of medal.

== Medal table ==
Rank	Nation	Gold	Silver	Bronze	Total
1	South Korea (KOR)	3	0	0	3
2	Slovakia (SVK)	1	1	2	4
3	Ukraine (UKR)	1	1	1	3
4	Chinese Taipei (TPE)	0	1	1	2
5	Brazil (BRA)	0	1	0	1
5	Lithuania (LTU)	0	1	0	1
7	Japan (JPN)	0	0	2	2
8	Egypt (EGY)	0	0	1	1
Totals (8 entries)		5	5	7	17

== Events ==
=== Men ===
Event	Gold	Silver	Bronze
70 kg	Kim Byung-soo; South Korea	Vyacheslav Makogon; Ukraine	Masahiro Sue; Japan
75 kg	Boo Chang-soon; South Korea	Igor Kočiš; Slovakia	Huang Chien-chih; Chinese Taipei
80 kg	None awarded	Hsu Chung-huang; Chinese Taipei	Masashi Suzuki; Japan
85 kg	Lee Jin-ho; South Korea	None awarded	Mohamed Kotb; Egypt
+85 kg	None awarded	None awarded	Peter Tatarka; Slovakia

=== Women ===
Event	Gold	Silver	Bronze
55 kg	Jana Purdjaková; Slovakia	Alina Čepurnienė; Lithuania	Nataliia Dichkovska; Ukraine
Fitness	Alevtyna Titarenko; Ukraine	Diana Almeida; Brazil	Anna Urbaníková; Slovakia
