= Ju-jitsu at the 2009 World Games – Men's fighting −94 kg =

Ju-jitsu men's fighting −94 kg at the 2009 World Games
- Venue: National Sun Yat-Sen University Gymnasium, Kaohsiung, Taiwan
- Dates: 22 July 2009
- Competitors: 7 from 7 nations

Medalists
gold medal	(Netherlands) Rob Haans
silver medal	(Russia) Sergey Kunashov
bronze medal	(France) Vincent Parisi

The men's fighting −94 kg competition in ju-jitsu at the 2009 World Games took place on 22 July 2009 at the National Sun Yat-Sen University Gymnasium in Kaohsiung, Taiwan.

== Competition format ==
A total of 7 athletes entered the competition. They fought in stepladder system.

== Results ==
=== Gold medal bracket ===
Quarterfinals
(France) Vincent Parisi (FRA)	W
(Ukraine) Leonid Rubtsov (UKR)	L
(Belgium) Danny Covyn (BEL)	W
(Montenegro) Ivan Barac (MNE)	L
(Russia) Sergey Kunashov (RUS)	W
(Poland) Tomasz Szewczak (POL)	L

Semifinals
(France) Vincent Parisi (FRA)	L
(Netherlands) Rob Haans (NED)	W
(Belgium) Danny Covyn (BEL)	L
(Russia) Sergey Kunashov (RUS)	W

Final
(Netherlands) Rob Haans (NED)	W
(Russia) Sergey Kunashov (RUS)	L

=== Bronze medal bracket ===
Quarterfinals
(Montenegro) Ivan Barac (MNE)	L
(Poland) Tomasz Szewczak (POL)	W

Semifinals
(Ukraine) Leonid Rubtsov (UKR)	W
(Belgium) Danny Covyn (BEL)	L
(Poland) Tomasz Szewczak (POL)	L
(France) Vincent Parisi (FRA)	W

Final
(Ukraine) Leonid Rubtsov (UKR)	L
(France) Vincent Parisi (FRA)	W
