= Sumo at the 2009 World Games – Women's heavyweight =

Sumo – Women's heavyweight at the 2009 World Games
- Venue: Kaohsiung Senior High School Gymnasium, Kaohsiung, Taiwan
- Dates: 17 July 2009
- Competitors: 16 from 10 nations

Medalists
gold medal	(Russia) Anna Zhigalova
silver medal	(Ukraine) Olga Davydko
bronze medal	(Russia) Ekaterina Keyb

The women's heavyweight competition in sumo at the 2009 World Games took place on 17 July 2009 at the Kaohsiung Senior High School Gymnasium in Kaohsiung, Taiwan.

== Competition format ==
A total of 16 athletes entered the competition. They fought in the cup system with repechages.

== Results ==
=== Main draw ===
	Score	
1/16 Finals
(Russia) Olesya Kovalenko (RUS)	W-L	(Japan) Yuka Ueta (JPN)
(Netherlands) Françoise Harteveld (NED)	L-W	(Ukraine) Olga Davydko (UKR)
(Chinese Taipei) Cheng Chiu-jung (TPE)	L-W	(Australia) Katherine Eber (AUS)
(Estonia) Kairi Kuur (EST)	W-L	(Hungary) Erika Makai (HUN)
(Poland) Edyta Witkowska (POL)	W-L	(Chinese Taipei) Lee Pei-shan (TPE)
(Russia) Ekaterina Keyb (RUS)	W-L	(Japan) Miki Satoyama (JPN)
(United States) Lindsay Hood (USA)	L-W	(Russia) Anna Zhigalova (RUS)
(Hungary) Gyongyi Kallo (HUN)	W-L	(Japan) Sayaka Sasaki (JPN)
Quarterfinals
(Russia) Olesya Kovalenko (RUS)	L-W	(Ukraine) Olga Davydko (UKR)
(Australia) Katherine Eber (AUS)	L-W	(Estonia) Kairi Kuur (EST)
(Poland) Edyta Witkowska (POL)	L-W	(Russia) Ekaterina Keyb (RUS)
(Russia) Anna Zhigalova (RUS)	W-L	(Hungary) Gyongyi Kallo (HUN)

=== Repechages ===
	Score	
1/16 Repechages
(Netherlands) Françoise Harteveld (NED)		Bye
(Australia) Katherine Eber (AUS)	L-W	(Hungary) Erika Makai (HUN)
(Japan) Miki Satoyama (JPN)	L-W	(Poland) Edyta Witkowska (POL)
(Hungary) Gyongyi Kallo (HUN)		Bye
Repechages Quarterfinals
(Netherlands) Françoise Harteveld (NED)	W-L	(Hungary) Erika Makai (HUN)
(Poland) Edyta Witkowska (POL)	L-W	(Hungary) Gyongyi Kallo (HUN)

=== Semifinals ===
	Score	
Semifinals
(Ukraine) Olga Davydko (UKR)	W-L	(Estonia) Kairi Kuur (EST)
(Russia) Ekaterina Keyb (RUS)	L-W	(Russia) Anna Zhigalova (RUS)
Repechages Semifinals
(Estonia) Kairi Kuur (EST)	W-L	(Hungary) Gyongyi Kallo (HUN)
(Russia) Ekaterina Keyb (RUS)	W-L	(Netherlands) Françoise Harteveld (NED)

=== Finals ===
	Score	
Gold medal match
(Ukraine) Olga Davydko (UKR)	L-W	(Russia) Anna Zhigalova (RUS)
Bronze medal match
(Estonia) Kairi Kuur (EST)	L-W	(Russia) Ekaterina Keyb (RUS)
