= Sport climbing at the 2009 World Games – Women's speed =

Sport climbing - Women's Speed at the 2009 World Games
- Venue: Shoushan Junior High School, Kaohsiung, Taiwan
- Dates: 18 July 2009
- Competitors: 12 from 8 nations

Medalists
gold medal	(China) He Cuilian
silver medal	(China) He Cuifang
bronze medal	(Russia) Olga Morozkina

The women's speed competition in sport climbing at the 2009 World Games took place on 18 July 2009 at the Shoushan Junior High School in Kaohsiung, Taiwan.

== Competition format ==
A total of 12 athletes entered the competition. In qualification every athlete has 2 runs, best time counts. Top 8 climbers qualify to main competition.

== Results ==
=== Qualifications ===
Rank	Athlete	Nation	Time 1	Time 2	Best of	Note
1	He Cuilian	China	9.65	9.65	9.65	Q
2	He Cuifang	China	10.93	10.93	10.93	Q
3	Edyta Ropek	Poland	11.94	11.06	11.06	Q
4	Lee Hung-ying	Chinese Taipei	12.41	11.96	11.96	Q
5	Yuliya Levochkina	Russia	13.02	12.15	12.15	Q
6	Olga Morozkina	Russia	12.26	12.26	12.26	Q
7	Svitlana Tuzhylina	Ukraine	12.39	12.36	12.36	Q
8	Lucelia Blanco	Venezuela	13.12	12.90	12.90	Q
9	Olena Ryepko	Ukraine	DNF	13.20	13.20	
10	Rosmery da Silva	Venezuela	15.46	14.85	14.85	
11	Carlie Lebreton	Australia	22.14	19.51	19.51	
12	Mykael Ann McGinley	United States	22.58	21.32	21.32	

=== Competition bracket ===
Quarter-finals
1	(China) He Cuilian	10.51
8	(Venezuela) Lucelia Blanco	DNF
4	(Chinese Taipei) Lee Hung-ying	11.02
5	(Russia) Yuliya Levochkina	12.48
2	(China) He Cuifang	10.32
7	(Ukraine) Svitlana Tuzhylina	11.70
3	(Poland) Edyta Ropek	DNF
6	(Russia) Olga Morozkina	13.51

Semi-finals
1	(China) He Cuilian	9.86
4	(Chinese Taipei) Lee Hung-ying	DNF
2	(China) He Cuifang	10.35
6	(Russia) Olga Morozkina	12.06

Finals
1	(China) He Cuilian	10.02
2	(China) He Cuifang	11.54
Third place
4	(Chinese Taipei) Lee Hung-ying	12.43
6	(Russia) Olga Morozkina	12.25
