= Ju-jitsu at the 2009 World Games – Women's fighting −55 kg =

Ju-jitsu women's fighting −55 kg at the 2009 World Games
- Venue: National Sun Yat-Sen University Gymnasium, Kaohsiung, Taiwan
- Dates: 22 July 2009
- Competitors: 8 from 8 nations

Medalists
gold medal	(France) Annabelle Reydy
silver medal	(Chinese Taipei) Li Ching-yi
bronze medal	(Kazakhstan) Aizhan Kukuzova

The women's fighting −55 kg competition in ju-jitsu at the 2009 World Games took place on 22 July 2009 at the National Sun Yat-Sen University Gymnasium in Kaohsiung, Taiwan.

== Competition format ==
A total of 8 athletes entered the competition. They fought in stepladder system.

== Results ==
=== Gold medal bracket ===
Quarterfinals
(Germany) Andrea Pflefka (GER)	L
(Poland) Martyna Bierońska (POL)	W
(Austria) Corina Cekada (AUT)	L
(France) Annabelle Reydy (FRA)	W
(Russia) Olga Pastushenko (RUS)	L
(Chinese Taipei) Li Ching-yi (TPE)	W
(Kazakhstan) Aizhan Kukuzova (KAZ)	W
(Singapore) Celestine Siew (SGP)	L

Semifinals
(Poland) Martyna Bierońska (POL)	L
(France) Annabelle Reydy (FRA)	W
(Chinese Taipei) Li Ching-yi (TPE)	W
(Kazakhstan) Aizhan Kukuzova (KAZ)	L

Final
(France) Annabelle Reydy (FRA)	W
(Chinese Taipei) Li Ching-yi (TPE)	L

=== Bronze medal bracket ===
Quarterfinals
(Germany) Andrea Pflefka (GER)	W
(Austria) Corina Cekada (AUT)	L
(Russia) Olga Pastushenko (RUS)	W
(Singapore) Celestine Siew (SGP)	L

Semifinals
(Germany) Andrea Pflefka (GER)	L
(Kazakhstan) Aizhan Kukuzova (KAZ)	W
(Russia) Olga Pastushenko (RUS)	L
(Poland) Martyna Bierońska (POL)	W

Final
(Kazakhstan) Aizhan Kukuzova (KAZ)	W
(Poland) Martyna Bierońska (POL)	L
