= Dancesport at the 2009 World Games – Latin =

Dancesport Latin at the 2009 World Games
- Venue: Kaohsiung Arena
- Date: 25 July 2009
- Competitors: 48 from 24 nations

Medalists
1st place, gold medalist(s)		Alexey Silde; Anna Firstova	Russia
2nd place, silver medalist(s)		Jurij Batagelj; Jagoda Štrukelj	Slovenia
3rd place, bronze medalist(s)		Gabriele Goffredo; Antonia Goffredo	Italy

The Latin competition in dancesport at the 2009 World Games took place on 25 July 2009 at the Kaohsiung Arena in Kaohsiung, Taiwan.

== Competition format ==
A total of 24 pairs entered the competition. Best eighteen pairs from round one qualifies to the semifinal. From semifinal the best six pairs qualifies to the final.

== Results ==
Rank	Athletes	Nation	Round 1	Semifinal	Final
1st place, gold medalist(s)	Alexey Silde/Anna Firstova	Russia	Q	Q	1
2nd place, silver medalist(s)	Jurij Batagelj/Jagoda Štrukelj	Slovenia	Q	Q	2
3rd place, bronze medalist(s)	Gabriele Goffredo/Antonia Goffredo	Italy	Q	Q	3
4	Timo Kulczak/Motshegetsi Mabuse	Germany	Q	Q	4
5	Marek Fiska/Kinga Jurecka	Poland	Q	Q	5
6	Jean-Philippe Milot/Laurence Bolduc	Canada	Q	Q	6
7	Daniils Kutuzovs/Viktorija Puhovika	Latvia	Q		
8	Sergey Onik/Melissa Blanco	United States	Q		
9	Markku Hyvarinen/Disa Kortelainin	Finland	Q		
10	Zufar Zaripov/Anna Ludwig-Tchemodourova	Austria	Q		
10	Yumiya Kubota/Rara Kubota	Japan	Q		
10	Dmytro Rosenko/Natalya Granko	Ukraine	Q		
13	Yosef Laskin/Yevgenia Libman	Israel	Q		
14	Carlos Custodio/Elena Plescenco	Portugal	Q		
15	Valerijus Osadchenko/Olga Osadchenko	Lithuania	Q		
16	Yen Peng/Vicky Zi	Chinese Taipei	Q		
16	Balazs Nagymihaly/Szilvia Szogi	Hungary	Q		
18	Kim Sung-min/Kim Mi-sun	South Korea	Q		
19	Ronnie Steeve Vergara/Charlea Lagaras	Philippines			
19	Alexei Kibkalo/Viktoria Kachalko	Kyrgyzstan			
21	Watcharakorn Suasuebrun/Warapa Jumbala	Thailand			
22	Sum Chun Ng/Wai Yi Lam	Hong Kong			
22	Keoikantse Motsepe/Otile Mabuse	South Africa			
24	Michael Yong/Janet Gooi	Malaysia			
