= Finswimming at the 2009 World Games – Men's 200 m surface =

International sporting event in Kaohsiung, Taiwan

Finswimming – men's 200 m surface at the 2009 World Games
- Venue: Kaohsiung Swimming Pool
- Location: Kaohsiung, Taiwan
- Date: 24 July 2009
- Competitors: 16 from 10 nations

Medalists
gold medal	(Italy) Stefano Figini
silver medal	(Italy) Andrea Nava
bronze medal	(South Korea) You Gyeong-heon

The men's 200 m surface competition in finswimming at the 2009 World Games took place on 24 July 2009 at the Kaohsiung Swimming Pool in Kaohsiung, Taiwan.

== Competition format ==
A total of 16 athletes entered the competition. The best eight athletes from preliminary round qualifies to the final.

== Results ==
=== Preliminary ===
Rank	Athlete	Nation	Time	Note
1	Stefano Figini	Italy	1:25.39	Q
2	Dmytro Shekera	Ukraine	1:25.51	Q
3	Denes Kanyo	Hungary	1:25.61	Q
4	Andrea Nava	Italy	1:26.15	Q
5	Daniel Kokai	Hungary	1:26.22	Q
6	You Gyeong-heon	South Korea	1:26.34	Q
7	Sven Lutzkendorf	Germany	1:26.42	Q
8	Roman Maletin	Russia	1:26.43	Q
9	Nikolay Reznikov	Russia	1:26.45	
10	Yoon Young-joong	South Korea	1:26.65	
11	Florian Ziegler	Germany	1:26.92	
12	Patrik Ščasný	Slovakia	1:27.93	
13	El Hassan Ghonim	Egypt	1:29.15	
14	Lin Chien-lung	Chinese Taipei	1:30.63	
15	Jian Ka	China	1:34.52	
16	Viktor Panov	Ukraine	1:35.03	

=== Final ===
Rank	Athlete	Nation	Time	Note
1st place, gold medalist(s)	Stefano Figini	Italy	1:22.10	GR
2nd place, silver medalist(s)	Andrea Nava	Italy	1:22.97	
3rd place, bronze medalist(s)	You Gyeong-heon	South Korea	1:23.42	
4	Denes Kanyo	Hungary	1:23.50	
5	Daniel Kokai	Hungary	1:24.66	
6	Dmytro Shekera	Ukraine	1:24.75	
7	Roman Maletin	Russia	1:25.50	
8	Sven Lutzkendorf	Germany	1:26.80	
