= Bowling at the 2005 World Games – Men's ten-pin singles =

Bowling men's ten-pin singles at the 2005 World Games
- Venue: RRZ / Bowling Center, Duisburg, Germany
- Date: 19–20 July 2005
- Competitors: 22 from 22 nations

Medalists
gold medal	(Finland) Kai Virtanen
silver medal	(Belgium) Gery Verbruggen
bronze medal	(United States) Andrew Cain

The men's ten-pin singles event in bowling at the 2005 World Games took place from 19 to 20 July 2005 at the RRZ / Bowling Center in Duisburg, Germany.

== Competition format ==
A total of 22 athletes entered the competition. Best ten athletes from preliminary round qualifies to the round-robin. In round-robin each player plays ten matches. For a win player gets 10 points and for a draw 5 points. Total pins and bonus points are counted as final result. From this stage the best three athletes advances to the finals.

== Results ==
=== Preliminary ===
Rank	Athlete	Nation	Result	Note
1	Kang Hee-won	South Korea	5418	Q
2	Yannaphon Larpapharat	Thailand	5399	Q
3	Achim Grabowski	Germany	5273	Q
4	Andrew Cain	United States	5246	Q
5	Gery Verbruggen	Belgium	5188	Q
6	Zulmazran Zulkifli	Malaysia	5128	Q
7	Kai Virtanen	Finland	5111	Q
8	Rolando Sebelen	Dominican Republic	5091	Q
9	François Sacco	France	5087	Q
10	Dimitrios Karetsos	Greece	5075	Q
11	Wu Siu Hong	Hong Kong	5045	
12	Steve Thornton	(United Kingdom) Great Britain	5036	
13	Mithat Siveliol	Turkey	4974	
14	Tyrel Rose	Canada	4925	
15	Engelberto Rivera	Philippines	4917	
16	Wim van der Ween	Netherlands	4815	
17	Carl De Vries	Singapore	4794	
18	Masaru Ito	Japan	4776	
19	Arturo Hernández	Venezuela	4754	
20	Chen Yung-chuan	Chinese Taipei	4616	
21	Carlo Sing	Panama	4605	
22	William Navas	Puerto Rico	4529	

=== Semifinal ===
Rank	Athlete	Nation	Pins	Bonus	Result	Note
1	Gery Verbruggen	Belgium	2270	60	2330	Q
2	Andrew Cain	United States	2225	65	2290	Q
3	Kai Virtanen	Finland	2168	60	2228	Q
4	Zulmazran Zulkifli	Malaysia	2163	40	2203	
5	Kang Hee-won	South Korea	2071	60	2131	
6	Dimitrios Karetsos	Greece	2074	35	2109	
7	François Sacco	France	2041	60	2101	
8	Rolando Sebelen	Dominican Republic	2019	50	2069	
9	Achim Grabowski	Germany	1963	30	1993	
10	Yannaphon Larpapharat	Thailand	1952	40	1992	

=== Finals ===
Semifinal			Final
			1	(Belgium) Gery Verbruggen	424
3	(Finland) Kai Virtanen	228	3	(Finland) Kai Virtanen	444
2	(United States) Andrew Cain	148
