= Ju-jitsu at the 2009 World Games – Men's fighting −77 kg =

Ju-jitsu men's fighting −77 kg at the 2009 World Games
- Venue: National Sun Yat-Sen University Gymnasium, Kaohsiung, Taiwan
- Dates: 22 July 2009
- Competitors: 8 from 8 nations

Medalists
gold medal	(Russia) Igor Rudnev
silver medal	(Germany) Mario Staller
bronze medal	(France) Percy Kunsa

The men's fighting −77 kg competition in ju-jitsu at the 2009 World Games took place on 22 July 2009 at the National Sun Yat-Sen University Gymnasium in Kaohsiung, Taiwan.

== Competition format ==
A total of 8 athletes entered the competition. They fought in stepladder system.

== Results ==
=== Gold medal bracket ===
Quarterfinals
(Chinese Taipei) Wu Chia-luan (TPE)	L
(Germany) Mario Staller (GER)	W
(Ukraine) Ivan Nastenko (UKR)	W
(Poland) Tomasz Krajewski (POL)	L
(France) Percy Kunsa (FRA)	W
(Sweden) Johan Ingholt (SWE)	L
(Russia) Igor Rudnev (RUS)	W
(Kazakhstan) Nurlan Tleumbetov (KAZ)	L

Semifinals
(Germany) Mario Staller (GER)	W
(Ukraine) Ivan Nastenko (UKR)	L
(France) Percy Kunsa (FRA)	L
(Russia) Igor Rudnev (RUS)	W

Final
(Germany) Mario Staller (GER)	L
(Russia) Igor Rudnev (RUS)	W

=== Bronze medal bracket ===
Quarterfinals
(Chinese Taipei) Wu Chia-luan (TPE)	W
(Poland) Tomasz Krajewski (POL)	L
(Sweden) Johan Ingholt (SWE)	L
(Kazakhstan) Nurlan Tleumbetov (KAZ)	W

Semifinals
(Chinese Taipei) Wu Chia-luan (TPE)	L
(France) Percy Kunsa (FRA)	W
(Kazakhstan) Nurlan Tleumbetov (KAZ)	W
(Ukraine) Ivan Nastenko (UKR)	L

Final
(France) Percy Kunsa (FRA)	W
(Kazakhstan) Nurlan Tleumbetov (KAZ)	L
