= Dancesport at the 2009 World Games – Standard =

Dancesport standard at the 2009 World Games
- Venue: Kaohsiung Arena
- Date: 24 July 2009
- Competitors: 48 from 24 nations

Medalists
1st place, gold medalist(s)		Paolo Bosco; Silvia Pitton	Italy
2nd place, silver medalist(s)		Benedetto Ferruggia; Claudia Köhler	Germany
3rd place, bronze medalist(s)		Marat Gimaev; Alina Basyuk	Russia

The standard competition in dancesport at the 2009 World Games took place on 24 July 2009 at the Kaohsiung Arena in Kaohsiung, Taiwan.

== Competition format ==
A total of 24 pairs entered the competition. Best eighteen pairs from round one qualifies to the quarterfinal. From semifinal twelve pairs qualifies to the semifinal. From semifinal the best six pairs qualifies to the final.

== Calendar ==
Event wook place on 24 July 2009.

== Results ==
Rank	Athletes	Nation	Round 1	Quarterfinal	Semifinal	Final
1st place, gold medalist(s)	Paolo Bosco/Silvia Pitton	Italy	Q	Q	Q	1
2nd place, silver medalist(s)	Benedetto Ferruggia/Claudia Köhler	Germany	Q	Q	Q	2
3rd place, bronze medalist(s)	Marat Gimaev/Alina Basyuk	Russia	Q	Q	Q	3
4	Donatas Vėželis/Lina Chatkevičiūtė	Lithuania	Q	Q	Q	4
5	Marek Kosaty/Paulina Glazik	Poland	Q	Q	Q	5
6	Salvatore Todaro/Violeta Yaneva	Bulgaria	Q	Q	Q	6
7	Martin Dvořák/Zuzana Šilhanová	Czech Republic	Q	Q		
8	Anton Kolyubayev/Anna Lantukh	Ukraine	Q	Q		
9	Csaba László/Anna Mikes	Hungary	Q	Q		
10	Masayuki Ishihara/Ayami Kubo	Japan	Q	Q		
11	Vladislav Ivanovich/Olga Trybushevaskaya	Belarus	Q	Q		
12	Andrejs Rogovenko/Anna Vorončuka	Latvia	Q	Q		
13	Steeve Gaudet/Laure Colmard	France	Q			
14	Isaac Rovira/Desiree Martin	Spain	Q			
15	Herman Lak/Michele Gleimann	Netherlands	Q			
16	Lee Sang-min/Kim Hye-in	South Korea	Q			
17	Veiko Ratas/Helena Liiv	Estonia	Q			
18	Sami Vainionpää/Merje Styff	Finland	Q			
19	Alan Gilin/Anastasia Trutneva	Canada				
20	Serghei Coropceanu/Marioara Cheptene	Moldova				
21	Eric Chao/Cherry Kao	Chinese Taipei				
21	Yevgeniy Plokhikh/Yelena Klyuchnikova	Kazakhstan				
23	Emmanuel Reyes/Maria Rosete	Philippines				
24	Clinton Soules/Maegan Kleinhans	South Africa				
