= Bowling at the 2009 World Games – Men's singles =

Bowling men's singles at the 2009 World Games
- Venue: Happy Bowling Alley, Kaohsiung, Taiwan
- Date: 21–22 July 2009
- Competitors: 23 from 23 nations

Medalists
gold medal	(Colombia) Manuel Otalora
silver medal	(Hong Kong) Wu Siu Hong
bronze medal	(Malaysia) Adrian Ang

The men's singles event in bowling at the 2009 World Games took place from 21 to 22 July at the Happy Bowling Alley.

== Competition format ==
A total of 23 athletes entered the competition. Best ten athletes from preliminary round qualifies to the round-robin. In round-robin each player plays ten matches. For a win player gets 10 points and for a draw 5 points. Total pins and bonus points are counted as final result. From this stage the best three athletes advances to the finals.

== Results ==
=== Preliminary ===
Rank	Athlete	Nation	Result	Note
1	Kong Byoung-hee	South Korea	3986	Q
2	Chris Barnes	United States	3904	Q
3	Adrian Ang	Malaysia	3874	Q
4	Remy Ong	Singapore	3843	Q
5	Tore Torgersen	Norway	3821	Q
6	Alejandro Cruz	Mexico	3797	Q
7	Wu Siu Hong	Hong Kong	3796	Q
8	Manuel Otalora	Colombia	3779	Q
9	Thomas Gross	Austria	3709	Q
10	Osku Palermaa	Finland	3708	Q
11	Chester King	Philippines	3698	
12	Achim Grabowski	Germany	3662	
13	Fang Chin-nan	Chinese Taipei	3659	
14	Jean-Marc Lebon	Belgium	3643	
15	Darron Cundy	(United Kingdom) Great Britain	3634	
16	Kunaksorn Sithipol	Thailand	3595	
17	Suguru Muroi	Japan	3494	
18	Luis Olivo	Venezuela	3493	
19	François Sacco	France	3455	
20	Guy Caminsky	South Africa	3442	
21	Checo Simon	Dominican Republic	3405	
22	Andres Herrera	Guatemala	3351	
23	Miguel Arevalo	El Salvador	3191	

=== Round-robin ===
Rank	Athlete	Nation	Pins	Bonus	Result	Note
1	Wu Siu Hong	Hong Kong	2179	80	2259	Q
2	Manuel Otalora	Colombia	2190	50	2240	Q
3	Adrian Ang	Malaysia	2164	70	2234	Q
4	Chris Barnes	United States	2161	60	2221	
5	Kong Byoung-hee	South Korea	2154	45	2199	
6	Osku Palermaa	Finland	2116	45	2161	
7	Thomas Gross	Austria	2110	50	2160	
8	Remy Ong	Singapore	2089	50	2139	
9	Alejandro Cruz	Mexico	2052	20	2072	
10	Tore Torgersen	Norway	1926	30	1956	

=== Finals ===
Semifinal			Final
			1	(Hong Kong) Wu Siu Hong	367
3	(Malaysia) Adrian Ang	181	2	(Colombia) Manuel Otalora	445
2	(Colombia) Manuel Otalora	184
