= Bowling at the 2009 World Games – Women's singles =

Bowling women's singles at the 2009 World Games
- Venue: Happy Bowling Alley, Kaohsiung, Taiwan
- Date: 21–22 July 2009
- Competitors: 23 from 23 nations

Medalists
gold medal	(Finland) Krista Pöllänen
silver medal	(United Kingdom) Zara Glover
bronze medal	(Philippines) Liza del Rosario

The women's singles event in bowling at the 2009 World Games took place from 21 to 22 July at the Happy Bowling Alley.

== Competition format ==
A total of 23 athletes entered the competition. Best ten athletes from preliminary round qualifies to the round-robin. In round-robin each player plays ten matches. For a win player gets 10 points and for a draw 5 points. Total pins and bonus points are counted as final result. From this stage the best three athletes advances to the finals.

== Results ==
=== Preliminary ===
Rank	Athlete	Nation	Result	Note
1	Zara Glover	(United Kingdom) Great Britain	3839	Q
2	Krista Pöllänen	Finland	3769	Q
3	Wang Yu-ling	Chinese Taipei	3765	Q
4	Patricia Luoto	Germany	3730	Q
5	Jennifer Tan	Singapore	3720	Q
6	Anggie Ramírez	Colombia	3669	Q
7	Gye Min-young	South Korea	3626	Q
8	Liza del Rosario	Philippines	3618	Q
9	Zatil Iman	Malaysia	3607	Q
10	Sofía Rodríguez	Guatemala	3577	Q
11	Chan Shuk Han	Hong Kong	3517	
12	Aumi Guerra	Dominican Republic	3494	
13	Stefanie Nation	United States	3436	
14	Sandra Góngora	Mexico	3399	
15	Poungthong Benchawan	Thailand	3388	
16	Patricia de Faria	Venezuela	3388	
17	Isabelle Saldjian	France	3372	
18	Saori Kanno	Japan	3299	
19	Patcharin Torgersen	Norway	3298	
20	Katrien Goossens	Belgium	3251	
21	Gaye Mack	South Africa	3245	
22	Ivonne Gross	Austria	3228	
23	Aida Granillo	El Salvador	3166	

=== Round-robin ===
Rank	Athlete	Nation	Pins	Bonus	Result	Note
1	Zara Glover	(United Kingdom) Great Britain	2169	50	2219	Q
2	Liza del Rosario	Philippines	2110	60	2170	Q
3	Krista Pöllänen	Finland	2093	45	2138	Q
4	Jennifer Tan	Singapore	2069	60	2129	
5	Zatil Iman	Malaysia	2046	70	2116	
6	Gye Min-young	South Korea	2054	50	2104	
7	Wang Yu-ling	Chinese Taipei	2002	40	2042	
8	Patricia Luoto	Germany	1974	45	2019	
9	Anggie Ramírez	Colombia	1924	50	1974	
10	Sofía Rodríguez	Guatemala	1757	30	1787	

=== Finals ===
Semifinal			Final
			1	(United Kingdom) Zara Glover	378
3	(Finland) Krista Pöllänen	215	3	(Finland) Krista Pöllänen	407
2	(Philippines) Liza del Rosario	210
