= Powerlifting at the 2009 World Games – Women's middleweight =

Powerlifting women's middleweight at the 2009 World Games
- Venue: National Sun Yat-sen University, Sun Yat-San Hall, Kaohsiung, Taiwan
- Date: 25 July 2009
- Competitors: 10 from 6 nations

Medalists
gold medal	(Indonesia) Noviana Sari
silver medal	(Ukraine) Tetyana Prymenchuk
bronze medal	(Ukraine) Zhanna Ivanova

The women's middleweight competition in powerlifting at the 2009 World Games took place on 25 July 2009 at the National Sun Yat-sen University, Sun Yat-San Hall in Kaohsiung, Taiwan.

== Competition format ==
A total of 10 athletes entered the competition. Each athlete had 3 attempts in each of 3 events: squat, bench press and deadlift. The athlete with the biggest score in Wilks points is the winner.

== Results ==
Rank	Athlete	Nation	Weight	Squat	Bench press	Deadlift	Total weight	Total points
1st place, gold medalist(s)	Noviana Sari	Indonesia	59.25	210.0	115.0	220.0	545.0	613.59
2nd place, silver medalist(s)	Tetyana Prymenchuk	Ukraine	57.45	200.0	125.0	185.0	510.0	588.18
3rd place, bronze medalist(s)	Zhanna Ivanova	Ukraine	59.65	217.5	122.5	185.0	525.0	587.97
4	Chou Chien-yu	Chinese Taipei	58.20	200.0	105.0	207.5	512.5	585.07
5	Tetyana Akhmamyetyeva	Ukraine	59.35	220.0	115.0	180.0	515.0	579.04
6	Ayako Ikeya	Japan	55.60	165.0	117.5	177.5	460.0	544.27
7	Vita Abdulina	Ukraine	56.25	190.0	102.5	170.0	462.5	542.28
8	Lee Chia-yu	Chinese Taipei	52.95	160.0	95.0	180.0	435.0	534.75
9	Jeanette Gevers	Australia	59.50	157.5	95.0	150.0	402.5	451.65
	Gundula von Bachhaus	Germany	59.30	NM	-	-	DSQ	DSQ
