= Trampoline gymnastics at the 2009 World Games =

Trampoline gymnastics event

- Venue: Kaohsiung Arena
- Dates: 20–22 July 2009
- Competitors: 76 from 18 nations

The trampoline gymnastics events at the 2009 World Games in Kaohsiung was played between 20 and 22 July. 76 gymnasts, from 18 nations, participated in the tournament. The trampoline gymnastics competition took place at Kaohsiung Arena.

== Participating nations ==
- Australia (4)
- Belarus (5)
- Brazil (1)
- Canada (6)
- China (2)
- Denmark (2)
- France (6)
- Germany (4)
- Great Britain (5)
- Italy (2)
- Japan (4)
- Poland (3)
- Portugal (8)
- Russia (8)
- South Africa (2)
- Ukraine (5)
- United States (7)
- Uzbekistan (2)

== Medal table ==
| Rank | Nation | Gold | Silver | Bronze | Total |
|---|---|---|---|---|---|
| 1 | Russia | 4 | 1 | 0 | 5 |
| 2 | Ukraine | 1 | 0 | 1 | 2 |
| 3 | Japan | 1 | 0 | 0 | 1 |
| 4 | United States | 0 | 1 | 1 | 2 |
| 5 | China | 0 | 1 | 0 | 1 |
| 5 | France | 0 | 1 | 0 | 1 |
| 5 | Great Britain | 0 | 1 | 0 | 1 |
| 5 | Portugal | 0 | 1 | 0 | 1 |
| 9 | Germany | 0 | 0 | 3 | 3 |
| 10 | Canada | 0 | 0 | 1 | 1 |
| Totals (10 entries) | | 6 | 6 | 6 | 18 |

== Events ==
=== Men's events ===
| Event | Gold | Silver | Bronze |
|---|---|---|---|
| Synchronized trampoline | Japan; Masaki Ito; Shunsuke Nagasaki | France; Sébastien Martiny; Grégoire Pennes | Germany; Martin Gromowski; Dennis Luxon |
| Double-mini trampoline | Kirill Ivanov; Russia | André Lico; Portugal | Nico Gärtner; Germany |
| Tumbling | Andrey Krylov; Russia | Mike Barnes; Great Britain | Viktor Kyforenko; Ukraine |

=== Women's events ===
| Event | Gold | Silver | Bronze |
|---|---|---|---|
| Synchronized trampoline | Ukraine; Yulia Domchevska; Olena Movchan | China; Gu Qingwen; Jiang Yiqi | Germany; Carina Baumgärtner; Jessica Simon |
| Double-mini trampoline | Victoria Voronina; Russia | Sarah Prosen; United States | Aubree Balkan; United States |
| Tumbling | Anna Korobeynikova; Russia | Anzhelika Soldatkina; Russia | Emily Smith; Canada |
