= Finswimming at the 2009 World Games – Men's 50 m apnoea =

Event in Kaohsiung, Taiwan

Finswimming – men's 50 m apnoea at the 2009 World Games
- Venue: Kaohsiung Swimming Pool
- Location: Kaohsiung, Taiwan
- Date: 24 July 2009
- Competitors: 15 from 11 nations

Medalists
gold medal	(Ukraine) Igor Soroka
silver medal	(Russia) Evgeny Skorzhenko
bronze medal	(South Korea) Lee Kwan-ho

The men's 50 m apnoea competition in finswimming at the 2009 World Games took place on 24 July 2009 at the Kaohsiung Swimming Pool in Kaohsiung, Taiwan.

== Competition format ==
A total of 15 athletes entered the competition. The best eight athletes from preliminary round qualifies to the final.

== Results ==
=== Preliminary ===
Rank	Athlete	Nation	Time	Note
1	Evgeny Skorzhenko	Russia	14.37	Q
2	Igor Soroka	Ukraine	14.47	Q
3	Lee Kwan-ho	South Korea	14.48	Q
4	Alexander Formin	Russia	14.70	Q
5	Nikolai Tover	Estonia	14.75	Q
6	Cen Jinlong	China	14.80	Q
7	Yuan Haifeng	China	14.90	Q
8	Dmytro Sydorenko	Ukraine	14.92	Q
9	Hideaki Sakai	Japan	15.04	
10	Cesare Fumarola	Italy	15.26	
11	Gianluca Mancini	Italy	15.35	
12	Erven Morice	France	15.55	
13	Karoly Joszt	Hungary	15.76	
14	Eslam Shama	Egypt	16.56	
15	Lin Yueh-hsun	Chinese Taipei	16.59	

=== Final ===
Rank	Athlete	Nation	Time
1st place, gold medalist(s)	Igor Soroka	Ukraine	14.38
2nd place, silver medalist(s)	Evgeny Skorzhenko	Russia	14.40
3rd place, bronze medalist(s)	Lee Kwan-ho	South Korea	14.51
4	Cen Jinlong	China	14.62
5	Nikolai Tover	Estonia	14.67
6	Alexander Formin	Russia	14.71
7	Yuan Haifeng	China	14.77
8	Dmytro Sydorenko	Ukraine	15.11
