= Powerlifting at the 2009 World Games – Men's middleweight =

Powerlifting men's middleweight at the 2009 World Games
- Venue: National Sun Yat-sen University, Sun Yat-San Hall, Kaohsiung, Taiwan
- Date: 25 July 2009
- Competitors: 10 from 7 nations

Medalists
gold medal	(Poland) Jarosław Olech
silver medal	(Ukraine) Andriy Naniev
bronze medal	(Poland) Jan Wegiera

The men's middleweight competition in powerlifting at the 2009 World Games took place on 25 July 2009 at the National Sun Yat-sen University, Sun Yat-San Hall in Kaohsiung, Taiwan.

== Competition format ==
A total of 10 athletes entered the competition. Each athlete had 3 attempts in each of 3 events: squat, bench press and deadlift. Athlete, who came with the biggest score in Wilks points is the winner.

== Results ==
Rank	Athlete	Nation	Weight	Squat	Bench press	Deadlift	Total weight	Total points
1st place, gold medalist(s)	Jarosław Olech	Poland	74.40	362.5 WR	220.0	302.5	885.0	634.19
2nd place, silver medalist(s)	Andriy Naniev	Ukraine	82.00	347.5	225.0	312.5	885.0	595.07
3rd place, bronze medalist(s)	Jan Wegiera	Poland	82.35	330.0	265.0 WR	290.0	885.0	593.53
4	Huang Lung-hsin	Chinese Taipei	76.20	310.0	220.0	307.5	837.5	590.27
5	Wade Hooper	United States	82.40	370.0	255.0	255.0	880.0	589.95
6	Wataru Kobayakawa	Japan	81.80	307.5	212.5	290.0	810.0	545.45
7	Kuan Yi-hsin	Chinese Taipei	74.00	292.5	175.0	290.0	757.5	544.87
8	Eriek Nickson	United States	74.75	287.5	185.0	277.5	750.0	535.69
9	Tom Kean	Canada	74.80	275.0	190.0	285.0	750.0	535.42
	Jaider Espinoza	Venezuela	82.35	330.0	NM	-	DSQ	DSQ
