= Powerlifting at the 2009 World Games – Women's heavyweight =

Powerlifting women's heavyweight at the 2009 World Games
- Venue: National Sun Yat-sen University, Sun Yat-San Hall, Kaohsiung, Taiwan
- Date: 26 July 2009
- Competitors: 9 from 7 nations

Medalists
gold medal	(Ukraine) Larysa Soloviova
silver medal	(Italy) Antonietta Orsini
bronze medal	(United States) Priscilla Ribic

The women's heavyweight competition in powerlifting at the 2009 World Games took place on 26 July 2009 at the National Sun Yat-sen University, Sun Yat-San Hall in Kaohsiung, Taiwan.

== Competition format ==
A total of 9 athletes entered the competition during the games. Each athlete had 3 attempts in each of 3 events: squat, bench press and deadlift. The athlete who achieved the highest score in Wilks points is the winner.

== Results ==
Rank	Athlete	Nation	Weight	Squat	Bench press	Deadlift	Total weight	Total points
1st place, gold medalist(s)	Larysa Soloviova	Ukraine	65.60	212.5	150.0	225.0	587.5	612.18
2nd place, silver medalist(s)	Antonietta Orsini	Italy	66.05	220.0	145.0	210.0	575.0	596.16
3rd place, bronze medalist(s)	Priscilla Ribic	United States	67.65	220.0	130.0	200.0	550.0	560.45
4	Mayumi Kitamura	Japan	66.20	202.5	145.0	192.5	540.0	558.95
5	Disa Hatfield	United States	67.75	190.0	132.5	192.5	515.0	524.24
6	Rhaea Fowler	Canada	74.40	220.0	152.5	170.0	542.5	518.36
7	Tseng Wei-jung	Chinese Taipei	73.55	212.5	105.0	212.5	530.0	510.12
	Hsu Hsiao-li	Chinese Taipei	63.00	NM	-	-	DSQ	DSQ
	Inger Blikra	Norway	74.70	200.0	NM	-	DSQ	DSQ
