= Air sports at the 2009 World Games – Parachuting accuracy landing =

Parachuting accuracy landing at the World Games
- Venue: Kaohsiung Metropolitan Park, Kaohsiung, Taiwan
- Date: 17–21 July 2009
- Competitors: 10 from 9 nations

Medalists
1st place, gold medalist(s)		Stefan Wiesner	Germany
2nd place, silver medalist(s)		Robert Juris	Slovakia
3rd place, bronze medalist(s)		Liubov Ekshikeeva	Russia

The accuracy landing event at the 2009 World Games in Kaohsiung was played from 17 to 21 July. 10 parachuters, from 9 nations, participated in the tournament. The competition took place at Kaohsiung Metropolitan Park.

== Competition format ==
A total of six rounds were contested. Athlete with the lowest score is a winner.

== Results ==
Rank	Athlete	Nation	R1	R2	R3	R4	R5	R6	Sum	TB
1st place, gold medalist(s)	Stefan Wiesner	Germany	0.01	0.02	0.01	0.02	0.01	0.02	0.09	0.00
2nd place, silver medalist(s)	Robert Juris	Slovakia	0.02	0.00	0.01	0.03	0.01	0.02	0.09	0.04
3rd place, bronze medalist(s)	Liubov Ekshikeeva	Russia	0.06	0.02	0.01	0.02	0.01	0.02	0.14	
4	Tibor Glesk	Australia	0.01	0.06	0.02	0.00	0.03	0.04	0.16	
5	István Asztalos	Hungary	0.03	0.01	0.01	0.16	0.01	0.01	0.23	
5	Jacek Klus	Poland	0.06	0.02	0.06	0.03	0.04	0.02	0.23	
5	Olga Lepezina	Russia	0.16	0.01	0.01	0.02	0.01	0.02	0.23	
8	Tibor Jirousek	Czech Republic	0.07	0.00	0.00	0.01	0.15	0.01	0.24	
9	Ville Kajala	Finland	0.03	0.00	0.04	0.05	0.03	0.16	0.31	
10	Pan I-lung	Chinese Taipei	0.12	0.03	0.10	0.04	0.02	0.11	0.42	
