= Finswimming at the 2009 World Games – Men's 4 x 100 m surface relay =

International sporting event in Kaohsiung, Taiwan

Finswimming - men's 4 x 100 m surface relay at the World Games
- Venue: Kaohsiung Swimming Pool
- Date: 24 July 2009
- Competitors: 32 from 8 nations

Medalists
1st place, gold medalist(s)		Viktor Panov; Dmytro Shekera; Igor Soroka; Dmytro Sydorenko
2nd place, silver medalist(s)		Stefano Figini; Cesare Fumarola; Gianluca Mancini; Andrea Nava
3rd place, bronze medalist(s)		Andrey Burakov; Pavel Kulakov; Nikolay Reznikov; Evgeny Skorzhenko

The men's 4 x 100 m surface relay event in finswimming at the 2009 World Games took place on 24 July 2009 at the Kaohsiung Swimming Pool in Kaohsiung, Taiwan.

== Competition format ==
A total of 8 teams entered the competition. Only final was held.

== Results ==
Rank	Country	Team	Time	Note
1st place, gold medalist(s)	Ukraine	Viktor Panov; Dmytro Shekera; Igor Soroka; Dmytro Sydorenko	2:24.83	GR
2nd place, silver medalist(s)	Italy	Stefano Figini; Cesare Fumarola; Gianluca Mancini; Andrea Nava	2:25.39	
3rd place, bronze medalist(s)	Russia	Andrey Burakov; Pavel Kulakov; Nikolay Reznikov; Evgeny Skorzhenko	2:25.54	
4	China	Mao Jingwei; Jian Ka; Cen Jinlong; Yuan Haifeng	2:26.11	
5	South Korea	Park Jeong-su; You Gyeong-heon; Yoon Young-joong; Lee Kwan-ho	2:28.37	
6	Hungary	Daniel Kokai; Denes Kanyo; Bence Kovy; Karoly Joszt	2:29.77	
7	Egypt	El Hassan Ghonim; Karim Fouda; Mohsen Abou Mosallem; Eslam Shama	2:38.59	
8	Chinese Taipei	Yang Ping-hua; Chang Chen-yu; Lin Chien-lung; Lin Yueh-hsun	2:40.46	
