= Trampoline gymnastics at the 2009 World Games – Women's synchronized trampoline =

Women's synchronized trampoline at the World Games
- Venue: Kaohsiung Arena
- Date: 22 July 2009
- Competitors: 22 from 10 nations

Medalists
1st place, gold medalist(s)		Yulia Domchevska; Olena Movchan
2nd place, silver medalist(s)		Gu Qingwen; Jiang Yiqi
3rd place, bronze medalist(s)		Carina Baumgärtner; Jessica Simon

The women's synchronized trampoline competition in trampoline gymnastics at the 2009 World Games took place on 22 July 2009 at the Kaohsiung in Kaohsiung Arena, Chinese Taipei.

== Competition format ==
A total of 11 pairs entered the competition. Best 8 duets from preliminary advances to the final. Only one pair from the same country may advance to the final.

== Results ==
=== Preliminary ===
Rank	Athlete	Nation	Round 1	Round 2	Total	Note
1	Gu Qingwen; Jiang Yiqi	China	39.000	47.200	86.200	Q
2	Karen Cockburn; Rosie MacLennan	Canada	39.900	45.400	85.300	Q
3	Carina Baumgärtner; Jessica Simon	Germany	37.600	44.500	82.100	Q
4	Anastasia Velichko; Victoria Voronina	Russia	37.600	43.700	81.300	Q
5	Mika Futagi; Ayano Kishi	Japan	37.300	43.600	80.900	Q
6	Galina Goncharenko; Anna Ivanova	Russia	36.700	44.000	80.700	
7	Ekaterina Khilko; Anna Savkina	Uzbekistan	37.300	42.500	79.800	Q
8	Ekaterina Mironova; Tatsiana Piatrenia	Belarus	38.300	40.400	78.700	Q
9	Yulia Domchevska; Olena Movchan	Ukraine	37.200	35.700	72.900	Q
10	Emilie Duclay; Marine Jurbert	France	37.400	17.500	54.900	
11	Nicole Pacheco; Ana Rente	Portugal	27.400	9.300	36.700	

=== Final ===
Rank	Athlete	Nation	Score
1st place, gold medalist(s)	Yulia Domchevska; Olena Movchan	Ukraine	46.800
2nd place, silver medalist(s)	Gu Qingwen; Jiang Yiqi	China	46.800
3rd place, bronze medalist(s)	Carina Baumgärtner; Jessica Simon	Germany	45.400
4	Ekaterina Mironova; Tatsiana Piatrenia	Belarus	45.000
5	Mika Futagi; Ayano Kishi	Japan	43.800
6	Ekaterina Khilko; Anna Savkina	Uzbekistan	41.200
7	Anastasia Velichko; Victoria Voronina	Russia	18.000
8	Karen Cockburn; Rosie MacLennan	Canada	14.400
