= Trampoline gymnastics at the 2009 World Games – Men's tumbling =

Men's tumbling at the 2009 World Games
- Venue: Kaohsiung Arena, Kaohsiung, Chinese Taipei
- Date: 21 July 2009
- Competitors: 8 from 8 nations

Medalists
gold medal	(Russia) Andrey Krylov
silver medal	(United Kingdom) Mike Barnes
bronze medal	(Ukraine) Viktor Kyforenko

The men's tumbling competition in trampoline gymnastics at the 2009 World Games took place on 21 July 2009 at the Kaohsiung in Kaohsiung Arena, Chinese Taipei.

== Competition format ==
A total of 8 athletes entered the competition. All of them advances to the final.

== Results ==
=== Preliminary ===
Rank	Athlete	Nation	Round 1	Round 2	Total	Note
1	Viktor Kyforenko	Ukraine	34.500	36.300	70.800	Q
2	Andrei Kabishev	Belarus	34.400	36.300	70.700	Q
3	Mike Barnes	(United Kingdom) Great Britain	35.300	35.400	70.700	Q
4	Andrey Krylov	Russia	37.700	31.100	68.800	Q
5	Alexander Seifert	Canada	33.600	35.100	68.700	Q
6	Mickael Gosset	France	33.600	32.900	66.500	Q
7	Adrian Bryłka	Poland	32.700	32.600	65.300	Q
8	Lebogang Ramokopelwa	South Africa	29.600	33.800	63.400	Q

=== Final ===
Rank	Athlete	Nation	Round 1	Round 2	Total
1st place, gold medalist(s)	Andrey Krylov	Russia	38.200	37.500	75.700
2nd place, silver medalist(s)	Mike Barnes	(United Kingdom) Great Britain	36.000	36.200	72.200
3rd place, bronze medalist(s)	Viktor Kyforenko	Ukraine	36.400	30.600	67.000
4	Andrei Kabishev	Belarus	32.900	33.200	66.100
5	Adrian Bryłka	Poland	31.000	33.500	64.500
6	Mickael Gosset	France	31.800	32.200	64.000
7	Alexander Seifert	Canada	31.400	30.100	61.500
8	Lebogang Ramokopelwa	South Africa	27.300	33.900	61.200
