= Rhythmic gymnastics at the 2009 World Games =

- Venue: Kaohsiung Arena
- Dates: 17–18 July 2009
- Competitors: 23 from 17 nations

The rhythmic gymnastics events at the 2009 World Games in Kaohsiung was played between 17 and 18 July. 23 rhythmic gymnastics competitors, from 17 nations, participated in the tournament. The rhythmic gymnastics competition took place at Kaohsiung Arena.

== Participating nations ==
- Austria (1)
- Azerbaijan (2)
- Belarus (2)
- Brazil (1)
- Bulgaria (2)
- Canada (1)
- Chinese Taipei (1)
- Estonia (1)
- Finland (1)
- Great Britain (1)
- Hungary (1)
- Japan (2)
- Portugal (1)
- Russia (2)
- Thailand (1)
- Ukraine (2)
- Uzbekistan (1)

== Medal table ==
| Rank | Nation | Gold | Silver | Bronze | Total |
|---|---|---|---|---|---|
| 1 | Russia | 4 | 1 | 1 | 6 |
| 2 | Ukraine | 0 | 3 | 0 | 3 |
| 3 | Azerbaijan | 0 | 0 | 1 | 1 |
| 3 | Belarus | 0 | 0 | 1 | 1 |
| 3 | Bulgaria | 0 | 0 | 1 | 1 |
| Totals (5 entries) | | 4 | 4 | 4 | 12 |

== Events ==
| Event | Gold | Silver | Bronze |
|---|---|---|---|
| Rope | Yevgeniya Kanayeva; Russia | Anna Bessonova; Ukraine | Olga Kapranova; Russia |
| Hoop | Yevgeniya Kanayeva; Russia | Olga Kapranova; Russia | Silvia Miteva; Bulgaria |
| Ball | Yevgeniya Kanayeva; Russia | Anna Bessonova; Ukraine | Melitina Staniouta; Belarus |
| Ribbon | Yevgeniya Kanayeva; Russia | Anna Bessonova; Ukraine | Aliya Garayeva; Azerbaijan |
