= Powerlifting at the 2009 World Games – Men's super heavyweight =

Powerlifting men's super heavyweight at the 2009 World Games
- Venue: National Sun Yat-sen University, Sun Yat-San Hall, Kaohsiung, Taiwan
- Date: 26 July 2009; 16 years ago
- Competitors: 10 from 8 nations

Medalists
gold medal	(United States) Mike Tuchscherer
silver medal	(Ukraine) Oleksandr Shepel
bronze medal	(Ukraine) Valeriy Karpov

The men's super heavyweight competition in powerlifting at the 2009 World Games took place on 26 July 2009 at the National Sun Yat-sen University, Sun Yat-San Hall in Kaohsiung, Taiwan.

== Competition format ==
A total of 10 athletes entered the competition. Each athlete had 3 attempts in each of 3 events: squat, bench press and deadlift. Athlete, who came with the biggest score in Wilks points is the winner.

== Results ==
Rank	Athlete	Nation	Weight	Squat	Bench press	Deadlift	Total weight	Total points
1st place, gold medalist(s)	Mike Tuchscherer	United States	121.15	410.0	272.5	375.0	1057.5	606.63
2nd place, silver medalist(s)	Oleksandr Shepel	Ukraine	125.20	420.0	260.0	367.5	1047.5	596.76
3rd place, bronze medalist(s)	Valeriy Karpov	Ukraine	109.90	390.0	265.0	337.5	992.5	584.28
4	Brad Gillingham	United States	147.75	382.5	265.0	387.5	1035.0	573.86
5	Tor Herman Omland	Norway	110.00	370.0	280.0	320.0	970.0	570.85
6	Milan Špingl	Czech Republic	144.05	422.5	285.0	315.0	1022.5	568.97
7	Jari Martikainen	Finland	152.00	400.0	265.0	350.0	1015.0	560.58
8	Andy Dörner	Germany	133.00	410.0	240.0	305.0	955.0	538.05
9	Brian Green	South Africa	119.90	340.0	250.0	320.0	910.0	523.25
	Daisuke Midote	Japan	134.25	390.0	NM	-	DSQ	DSQ
