= Bowling at the 2009 World Games =

- Venue: Happy Bowling Alley
- Dates: 20–22 July 2009
- Competitors: 46 from 23 nations

The bowling events at the 2009 World Games in Kaohsiung was played between 20 and 22 July. 46 competitors, from 23 nations, participated in the tournament. The bowling competition took place at Happy Bowling Alley.

== Participating nations ==
- Austria (2)
- Belgium (2)
- Chinese Taipei (2)
- Colombia (2)
- Dominican Republic (2)
- El Salvador (2)
- Finland (2)
- France (2)
- Germany (2)
- Great Britain (2)
- Guatemala (2)
- Hong Kong (2)
- Japan (2)
- South Korea (2)
- Malaysia (2)
- Mexico (2)
- Norway (2)
- Philippines (2)
- Singapore (2)
- South Africa (2)
- Thailand (2)
- United States (2)
- Venezuela (2)

== Medal table ==
Rank	Nation	Gold	Silver	Bronze	Total
1	Colombia	1	1	0	2
2	Finland	1	0	0	1
2	South Korea	1	0	0	1
4	Great Britain	0	1	0	1
4	Hong Kong	0	1	0	1
6	Malaysia	0	0	2	2
7	Philippines	0	0	1	1
Totals (7 entries)		3	3	3	9

== Events ==
Event	Gold	Silver	Bronze
Men's singles	Manuel Otalora; Colombia	Wu Siu Hong; Hong Kong	Adrian Ang; Malaysia
Women's singles	Krista Pöllänen; Finland	Zara Glover; Great Britain	Liza del Rosario; Philippines
Mixed doubles	South Korea; Kong Byoung-hee; Gye Min-young	Colombia; Manuel Otalora; Anggie Ramírez	Malaysia; Adrian Ang; Zatil Iman
