= Finswimming at the 2009 World Games – Women's 400 m surface =

Finswimming – women's 400 m surface at the 2009 World Games
- Venue: Kaohsiung Swimming Pool
- Location: Kaohsiung, Taiwan
- Date: 24 July 2009
- Competitors: 13 from 10 nations

Medalists
gold medal	(Russia) Vasilisa Kravchuk
silver medal	(China) Liu Jiao
bronze medal	(Ukraine) Olga Shlyakhovska

The women's 400 m surface competition in finswimming at the 2009 World Games took place on 24 July 2009 at the Kaohsiung Swimming Pool in Kaohsiung, Taiwan.

== Competition format ==
A total of 13 athletes entered the competition. The best eight athletes from preliminary round qualifies to the final.

== Results ==
=== Preliminary ===
Rank	Athlete	Nation	Time	Note
1	Vasilisa Kravchuk	Russia	3:23.51	Q
2	Olga Shlyakhovska	Ukraine	3:24.26	Q
3	Liu Jiao	China	3:24.71	Q
4	Valeriya Baranovskaya	Russia	3:25.72	Q
5	Olga Godovana	Ukraine	3:26.10	Q
6	Yu Xin	China	3:27.05	Q
7	Melinda Wirtz	Hungary	3:28.15	Q
8	Zuzana Svozilová	Czech Republic	3:28.63	Q
9	Jeon Ah-ram	South Korea	3:28.76	
10	Franziska Schreiber	Germany	3:30.26	
11	Liu Hao-min	Chinese Taipei	3:35.53	
12	Nikola Marincakova	Slovakia	3:35.76	
13	Toka El-Kordi	Egypt	3:44.10	

=== Final ===
Rank	Athlete	Nation	Time	Note
1st place, gold medalist(s)	Vasilisa Kravchuk	Russia	3:15.36	WR
2nd place, silver medalist(s)	Liu Jiao	China	3:17.67	
3rd place, bronze medalist(s)	Olga Shlyakhovska	Ukraine	3:19.40	
4	Yu Xin	China	3:22.37	
5	Valeriya Baranovskaya	Russia	3:22.58	
6	Olga Godovana	Ukraine	3:24.64	
7	Zuzana Svozilová	Czech Republic	3:27.91	
8	Melinda Wirtz	Hungary	3:30.42	
