= Powerlifting at the 2009 World Games – Men's heavyweight =

Powerlifting men's heavyweight at the 2009 World Games
- Venue: National Sun Yat-sen University, Sun Yat-San Hall, Kaohsiung, Taiwan
- Date: 25 July 2009
- Competitors: 10 from 8 nations

Medalists
| gold medal | (Ukraine) Sergiy Pevnev |
| silver medal | (Poland) Jacek Wiak |
| bronze medal | (Luxembourg) Anibal Coimbra |

The men's heavyweight competition in powerlifting at the 2009 World Games took place on 25 July 2009 at the National Sun Yat-sen University, Sun Yat-San Hall in Kaohsiung, Taiwan.

== Competition format ==
A total of 10 athletes entered the competition. Each athlete had 3 attempts in each of 3 events: squat, bench press and deadlift. Athlete, who came with the biggest score in Wilks points is the winner.

== Results ==
| Rank | Athlete | Nation | Weight | Squat | Bench press | Deadlift | Total weight | Total points |
|---|---|---|---|---|---|---|---|---|
| 1st place, gold medalist(s) | Sergiy Pevnev | Ukraine | 99.25 | 380.0 | 280.0 | 340.0 | 1000.0 | 610.45 |
| 2nd place, silver medalist(s) | Jacek Wiak | Poland | 98.75 | 385.0 | 260.0 | 320.0 | 965.0 | 590.29 |
| 3rd place, bronze medalist(s) | Anibal Coimbra | Luxembourg | 99.05 | 367.5 | 245.0 | 345.0 | 957.5 | 584.98 |
| 4 | Andre Peeters | France | 98.90 | 360.0 | 240.0 | 330.0 | 930.0 | 568.51 |
| 5 | David Ricks | United States | 87.75 | 317.5 | 222.5 | 327.5 | 867.5 | 561.19 |
| 6 | Nicholas Tylutki | United States | 99.95 | 350.0 | 215.0 | 325.0 | 890.0 | 541.74 |
| 7 | Jeremy Hartman | United States | 99.65 | 315.0 | 230.0 | 325.0 | 870.0 | 530.22 |
| 8 | Chen Ching-chung | Chinese Taipei | 98.75 | 300.0 | 190.0 | 270.0 | 760.0 | 464.89 |
| 9 | Johan Smith | South Africa | 89.60 | 290.0 | 170.0 | 260.0 | 720.0 | 460.66 |
| | Richard Hozjan | Australia | 99.20 | 305.0 | NM | - | DSQ | DSQ |
