= Finswimming at the 2009 World Games – Men's 100 m surface =

International sporting event in Kaohsiung, Taiwan

Finswimming – men's 100 m surface at the 2009 World Games
- Venue: Kaohsiung Swimming Pool
- Location: Kaohsiung, Taiwan
- Date: 23 July 2009
- Competitors: 16 from 10 nations

Medalists
gold medal	(China) Miao Jingwei
silver medal	(Ukraine) Dmytro Sydorenko
bronze medal	(Italy) Andrea Nava

The men's 100 m surface competition in finswimming at the 2009 World Games took place on 23 July 2009 at the Kaohsiung Swimming Pool in Kaohsiung, Taiwan.

== Competition format ==
A total of 16 athletes entered the competition. The best eight athletes from preliminary round qualifies to the final.

== Results ==
=== Preliminary ===
Rank	Athlete	Nation	Time	Notes
1	Dmytro Sydorenko	Ukraine	35.85	Q, GR
2	Miao Jingwei	China	36.19	Q
3	Andrea Nava	Italy	36.35	Q
4	Yuan Haifeng	China	36.72	Q
5	Leonidas Romero	Colombia	36.78	Q
6	Pavel Kulakov	Russia	36.91	Q
7	Andrey Burakov	Russia	36.94	Q
8	Dmytro Shekera	Ukraine	37.06	Q
9	Cesare Fumarola	Italy	37.30	
10	Daniel Kokai	Hungary	37.39	
11	Park Jeong-su	South Korea	37.66	
12	Bence Kovy	Hungary	38.04	
13	Erven Morice	France	38.20	
14	Enrico Schultz	Germany	38.56	
15	Eslam Shama	Egypt	39.14	
16	Karim Fouda	Egypt	39.27	

=== Final ===
Rank	Athlete	Nation	Time
1st place, gold medalist(s)	Miao Jingwei	China	35.95
2nd place, silver medalist(s)	Dmytro Sydorenko	Ukraine	36.24
3rd place, bronze medalist(s)	Andrea Nava	Italy	36.35
4	Leonidas Romero	Colombia	36.48
5	Yuan Haifeng	China	36.51
6	Pavel Kulakov	Russia	36.85
7	Dmytro Shekera	Ukraine	37.18
	Andrey Burakov	Russia	DNF
