= Powerlifting at the 2009 World Games – Women's super heavyweight =

Powerlifting women's super heavyweight at the 2009 World Games
- Venue: National Sun Yat-sen University, Sun Yat-San Hall, Kaohsiung, Taiwan
- Date: 26 July 2009; 16 years ago
- Competitors: 10 from 6 nations

Medalists
gold medal	(Ukraine) Iryna Yavorska
silver medal	(United States) Jessica O'Donnell
bronze medal	(Chinese Taipei) Chang Ya-wen

The women's super heavyweight competition in powerlifting at the 2009 World Games took place on 26 July 2009 at the National Sun Yat-sen University, Sun Yat-San Hall in Kaohsiung, Taiwan.

== Competition format ==
A total of 10 athletes entered the competition. Each athlete had 3 attempts in each of 3 events: squat, bench press and deadlift. The athlete with the biggest score in Wilks points is the winner.

== Results ==
Rank	Athlete	Nation	Weight	Squat	Bench press	Deadlift	Total weight	Total points
1st place, gold medalist(s)	Iryna Yavorska	Ukraine	81.10	237.5	165.0	237.5	640.0	581.25
2nd place, silver medalist(s)	Jessica O'Donnell	United States	99.80	267.5	180.0	242.5	690.0	574.84
3rd place, bronze medalist(s)	Chang Ya-wen	Chinese Taipei	86.10	262.5	140.0	220.0	622.5	548.48
4	Liane Blyn	United States	76.60	227.5	147.5	207.5	582.5	546.62
5	Heidi Hille Arnesen	Norway	75.50	215.0	127.5	195.0	537.5	508.85
6	Brenda van der Meulen	Netherlands	107.40	240.0	165.0	195.0	600.0	490.38
7	Joanne Schaefer-Williams	Netherlands	105.00	210.0	180.0	197.5	587.5	482.75
8	Erlina Pecante	Philippines	82.55	220.0	120.0	195.0	535.0	481.34
9	Hung Min-chu	Chinese Taipei	84.30	205.0	165.0	165.0	535.0	476.26
	Ielja Strik	Netherlands	86.70	257.5	NM	-	DSQ	DSQ
