= Finswimming at the 2009 World Games – Women's 200 m surface =

Finswimming – women's 200 m surface at the 2009 World Games
- Venue: Kaohsiung Swimming Pool
- Location: Kaohsiung, Taiwan
- Date: 23 July 2009
- Competitors: 15 from 9 nations

Medalists
gold medal	(Russia) Vasilisa Kravchuk
silver medal	(Russia) Valeriya Baranovskaya
bronze medal	(Ukraine) Olga Shlyakhovska

The women's 200 m surface competition in finswimming at the 2009 World Games took place on 23 July 2009 at the Kaohsiung Swimming Pool in Kaohsiung, Taiwan.

== Competition format ==
A total of 15 athletes entered the competition. The best eight athletes from preliminary round qualifies to the final.

== Results ==
=== Preliminary ===
Rank	Athlete	Nation	Time	Note
1	Sandra Pilz	Germany	1:33.05	Q
2	Vasilisa Kravchuk	Russia	1:33.29	Q
3	Olga Shlyakhovska	Ukraine	1:33.72	Q
4	Valeriya Baranovskaya	Russia	1:34.33	Q
5	Franziska Schreiber	Germany	1:34.90	Q
6	Csilla Karolyi	Hungary	1:35.26	Q
7	Olga Godovana	Ukraine	1:35.71	Q
8	Zuzana Svozilová	Czech Republic	1:36.29	Q
9	Choi Sae-rom	South Korea	1:36.39	
10	Hajnalka Debreczeni	Hungary	1:36.73	
11	Li Jing	China	1:37.52	
12	Nikola Marincakova	Slovakia	1:38.86	
13	Jeon Ah-ram	South Korea	1:39.89	
14	Toka El-Kordi	Egypt	1:43.03	
15	Zhu Baozhen	China	1:48.07	

=== Final ===
Rank	Athlete	Nation	Time	Note
1st place, gold medalist(s)	Vasilisa Kravchuk	Russia	1:29.30	WR
2nd place, silver medalist(s)	Valeriya Baranovskaya	Russia	1:30.37	
3rd place, bronze medalist(s)	Olga Shlyakhovska	Ukraine	1:32.23	
4	Sandra Pilz	Germany	1:32.96	
5	Olga Godovana	Ukraine	1:33.58	
6	Csilla Karolyi	Hungary	1:34.33	
7	Franziska Schreiber	Germany	1:34.95	
8	Zuzana Svozilová	Czech Republic	1:37.22	
