= Finswimming at the 2001 World Games =

Competition held in Akita, Japan

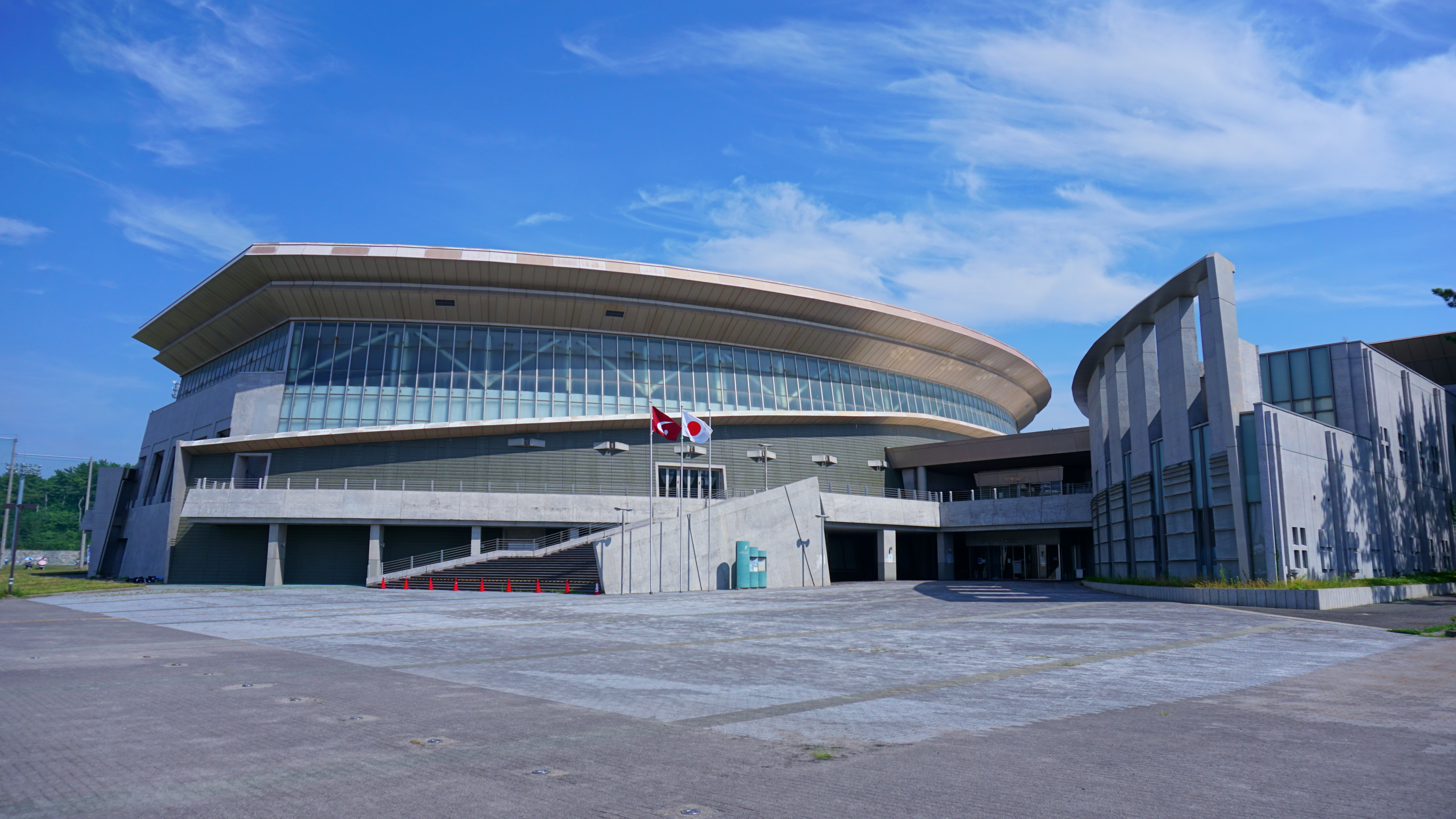
- Akita Prefectural Pool
- Venue: Akita Prefectural Pool
- Dates: 24–25 August 2001
- Competitors: 76 from 17 nations

The finswimming events at the 2001 World Games in Akita was played between 24 and 25 August. A total o 76 athletes from 17 nations participated in the tournament. The competition took place in Akita Prefectural Pool.

== Participating nations ==
- Austria (1)
- China (9)
- Colombia (5)
- Czech Republic (8)
- Estonia (1)
- Finland (2)
- France (4)
- Germany (8)
- Hungary (5)
- Japan (8)
- Netherlands (2)
- New Zealand (1)
- Poland (2)
- Russia (11)
- Slovakia (1)
- South Korea (4)
- Spain (4)

== Medal table ==
Rank	Nation	Gold	Silver	Bronze	Total
1	Russia	8	5	2	15
2	China	1	3	4	8
3	Germany	1	1	4	6
4	Hungary	0	1	0	1
Totals (4 entries)		10	10	10	30

== Events ==
=== Men ===
Event	Gold	Silver	Bronze
50 m apnoea	Evgeny Skorzhenko; Russia	Li Yong; China	Zhao Ji; China
100 m surface	Evgeny Skorzhenko; Russia	Sergey Akhapov; Russia	Huang Jiandong; China
200 m surface	Sergey Akhapov; Russia	Andreas Utzmeir; Germany	Ilya Somov; Russia
400 m surface	Sven Gallasch; Germany	Gergely Juhos; Hungary	Ilya Somov; Russia
4 × 100 m surface	Russia; Ilya Somov; Evgeny Skorzhenko; Maksim Maksimov; Sergey Akhapov	China; Zhao Ji; Hu Hailong; Huang Jiandong; Li Yong	Germany; Frank Wille; Sven Kaiser; Sven Gallasch; Andreas Utzmeir

=== Women ===
Event	Gold	Silver	Bronze
50 m apnoea	Anastassia Kochneva; Russia	Tatiana Komarova; Russia	Zhu Baozhen; China
100 m surface	Liu Qi; China	Tatiana Komarova; Russia	Zhu Baozhen; China
200 m surface	Anastassia Glukhikh; Russia	Lidia Goriacheva; Russia	Suzanne Jentzsch; Germany
400 m surface	Elena Gracheva; Russia	Anastassia Glukhikh; Russia	Bettina Müller; Germany
4 × 100 m surface	Russia; Tatiana Komarova; Lidia Goriacheva; Irina Egoruchkina; Anastassia Kochneva	China; Zhu Baozhen; Li Qingping; Wu Xiaohui; Liu Qi	Germany; Suzanne Jentzsch; Tina Hirschfeldt; Bettina Müller; Christine Müller
