= Finswimming at the 2009 World Games =

International competition in Kaohsiung

- Venue: Kaohsiung Swimming Pool
- Dates: 23–24 July 2009
- Competitors: 79 from 14 nations

The finswimming events at the 2009 World Games in Kaohsiung was played between 23 and 24 July. 79 athletes from 14 nations participated in this discipline. The competition took place in Kaohsiung Swimming Pool.

== Participating nations ==
- China (11)
- Chinese Taipei (5)
- Colombia (2)
- Egypt (5)
- Estonia (2)
- France (3)
- Germany (7)
- Hungary (8)
- Italy (5)
- Japan (2)
- Russia (10)
- Slovakia (2)
- South Korea (8)
- Ukraine (9)

== Medal table ==
Rank	Nation	Gold	Silver	Bronze	Total
1	China	4	3	0	7
2	Russia	2	2	3	7
3	Italy	2	2	1	5
4	Ukraine	2	1	2	5
5	South Korea	0	1	3	4
6	Germany	0	1	0	1
7	France	0	0	1	1
7	Hungary	0	0	1	1
Totals (8 entries)		10	10	11	31

== Events ==
=== Men ===
Event	Gold	Silver	Bronze
50 m apnoea	Igor Soroka; Ukraine	Evgeny Skorzhenko; Russia	Lee Kwan-ho; South Korea
100 m surface	Miao Jingwei; China	Dmytro Sydorenko; Ukraine	Andrea Nava; Italy
200 m surface	Stefano Figini; Italy	Andrea Nava; Italy	You Gyeong-heon; South Korea
400 m surface	Stefano Figini; Italy	Sven Lützkendorf; Germany	Dénes Kanyó; Hungary
4 × 100 m surface relay	Ukraine; Viktor Panov; Dmytro Shekera; Igor Soroka; Dmytro Sydorenko	Italy; Stefano Figini; Cesare Fumarola; Gianluca Mancini; Andrea Nava	Russia; Andrey Burakov; Pavel Kulakov; Nikolay Reznikov; Evgeny Skorzhenko

=== Women ===
Event	Gold	Silver	Bronze
50 m apnoea	Zhu Baozhen; China	Xu Huanshan; China	Yana Kasimova; Russia
100 m surface	Zhu Baozhen; China	Liang Yaoyue; China	Camille Heitz; France
100 m surface	Zhu Baozhen; China	Liang Yaoyue; China	Choi Sae-rom; South Korea
200 m surface	Vasilisa Kravchuk; Russia	Valeriya Baranovskaya; Russia	Olga Shlyakhovska; Ukraine
400 m surface	Vasilisa Kravchuk; Russia	Liu Jiao; China	Olga Shlyakhovska; Ukraine
4 × 100 m surface relay	China; Li Jing; Liang Yaoyue; Xu Yichuan; Zhu Baozhen	South Korea; Choi Sae-rom; Jang Ye-sol; Jeon Ah-ram; Kim Hyeon-jin	Russia; Valeriya Baranovskaya; Medeya Dzhavakhishvili; Yana Kasimova; Vasilisa Kravchuk
