= Noviana Sari =

Indonesian powerlifter

Personal information
- Born: 1984 (age 41–42) Pringsewu, Lampung, Indonesia

Sport
- Country: Indonesia
- Sport: Powerlifting
Medal record
Women's powerlifting
Representing Indonesia
World Games
Gold medal – first place	2009 Kaohsiung	Middleweight
World Championships
Silver medal – second place	2008 St. Johns	60 kg
Silver medal – second place	2009 New Delhi	60 kg
Silver medal – second place	2012 Aguadilla	63 kg
Bronze medal – third place	2010 Potchefstroom	60 kg
Bronze medal – third place	2013 Stavanger	63 kg
Bronze medal – third place	2015 Hamm	63 kg
Asia-Oceania Championships
Gold medal – first place	2014 Melbourne	63 kg
Asian Championships
Gold medal – first place	2011 Kobe	63 kg
Gold medal – first place	2015 Hong Kong	63 kg
Gold medal – first place	2016 Udaipur	63 kg
Gold medal – first place	2017 Soreang	63 kg
Gold medal – first place	2018 Udaipur	63 kg
Asian Junior Championships
Gold medal – first place	2007 Kaohsiung	60 kg

Noviana Sari (born 1984) is an Indonesian powerlifter. She won gold medal at the 2009 World Games. In the Asian Championships, she won six gold medals, four gold medals won in a row. In the World Championships she won three silver medals and three bronze medals.

== Career ==
Noviana Sari started her career by training at the Padepokan Gajah Lampung, this is a place for powerlifting and weightlifting athletes who will compete in national and international championships.
