= Finswimming at the 1981 World Games =

- Venue: Santa Clara International Swim Center
- Location: Santa Clara

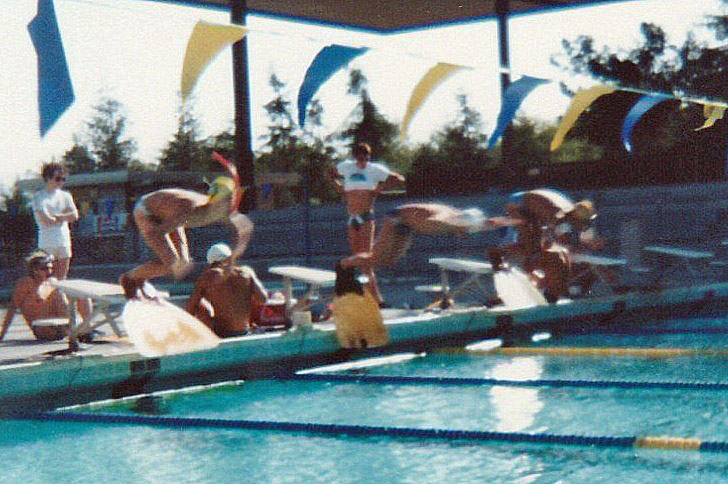
Finswimming competition at World Games I

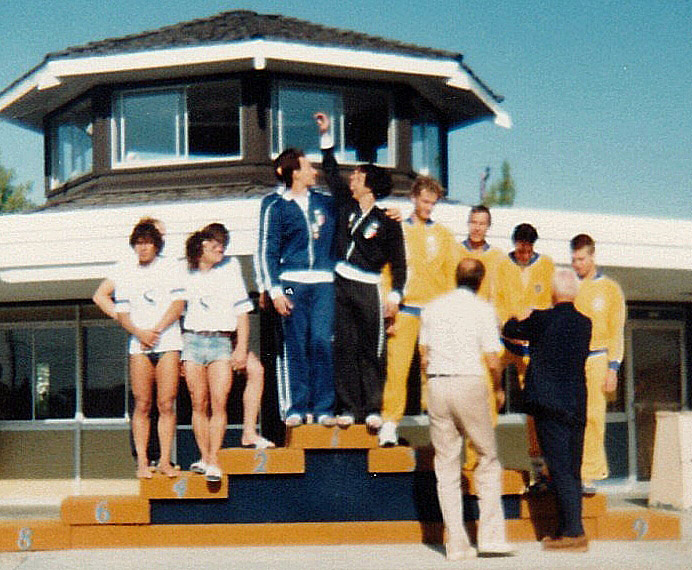
Medals podium for the unofficial men's finswimming 4x200m relay, with Italy II on top (time 6:30.16) and Sweden, the next single-nationality team, in third place. Other swimmers stood in for the second-place team of two West German and two French athletes.

The finswimming events of World Games I were held on July 25–27, 1981, at Santa Clara International Swim Center in Santa Clara, California, in the United States. These were the first World Games, an international quadrennial multi-sport event, and were hosted by the city of Santa Clara. Athletes from Italy won 16 of the 36 total medals. France followed with 11 medals. Jürgen Kolenda of West Germany collected four gold medals.

== Medalists ==
Event	Gold	Silver	Bronze
Men
50m apnoea	Jürgen Kolenda (FRG)	Sandro Sola (ITA)	Dario Broglia (ITA)
100m freestyle	Jürgen Kolenda (FRG)	Sandro Sola (ITA)	Giuseppe Galantucci (ITA)
200m freestyle	Jürgen Kolenda (FRG)	Valter Olander (SWE)	Sandro Sola (ITA)
400m freestyle	Giuseppe Galantucci (ITA)	Valter Olander (SWE)	Paolo Vandini (ITA)
1500m freestyle	Paolo Vandini (ITA)	Giuseppe Galantucci (ITA)	Valter Olander (SWE)
100m immersion	Jürgen Kolenda (FRG)	Dario Broglia (ITA)	Thierry Lasbleye (FRA)
Women
50m apnoea	Cristina Covoni (ITA)	Monica Crovetti (ITA)	Anne Menguy (FRA)
100m freestyle	Anne Menguy (FRA)	Cristina Covoni (ITA)	Anne-Marie Rouchon (FRA)
200m freestyle	Anne-Marie Rouchon (FRA)	Anne Menguy (FRA)	Marion Collot (FRA)
400m freestyle	Anne-Marie Rouchon (FRA)	Monica Crovetti (ITA)	Marina Beck (FRG)
800m freestyle	Anne-Marie Rouchon (FRA)	Marion Collot (FRA)	Monica Crovetti (ITA)
100m immersion	Cristina Covoni (ITA)	Anne Menguy (FRA)	Marina Beck (FRG)

== Details ==
=== Men ===
==== 50m apnoea ====
1. Jurgen Kolenda, W. Germany, 16.667.

2. Sandro Sola, Italy, 17.728.

3. Dario Broglia, Italy, 17.790.

4. Mickel Zorte, France, 18.375.

5. Clemens Franck, W. Germany, 18.512.

6. Peter Swenson, Sweden, 18.563.

7. Thierry Lasbleye, France, 18.577.

8. Lars Anderson, Sweden, 20.484.

==== 100m freestyle ====
1. Jurgen Kolenda, W. Germany, 41.201.

2. Sandro Sola, Italy, 41.881.

3. Giuseppe Galantucci, Italy, 43.264.

4. Dario Broglia, Italy, 43.345.

5. Peter Svenson, Sweden, 43.541.

6. Thierry Lasbleye, France, 43.862.

7. Clemens Franck, W. Germany, 44.952.

8. Michel Zoete, France, 45.903.

==== 200m freestyle ====
1. Jurgen Kolenda, W. Germany, 1:33.294.

2. Walter Olander, Sweden, 1:35.511.

3. Sandro Sola, Italy, 1:36.397.

4. Dario Broglia, Italy, 1:36.397.

5. Giuseppe Galantucci, Italy, 1:37.149.

6. Thierry Lasbleye, France, 1:38.315.

7. Peter Svenson, Sweden, 1:38.696.

8. Thierry Henry, France, 1:40.661.

9. Clemens Franck, W. Germany, 1:41.627.

10. Lars Anderson, Sweden, 1:47.239.

11. Mickel Zorte, France, 1:47.575.

==== 400m freestyle ====
1. Giuseppe Galantucci, Italy, 3:28.01.

2. Walter Olander, Sweden, 3:28.62.

3. Paolo Vandini, Italy, 3:28.65.

4. Jurgen Kolenda, W. Germany, 3:31.78.

5. Peter Swenson, Sweden, 3:42.33.

6. Thierry Henry, France, 3:42.48.

7. Memens Franck, W. Germany, 3:42.72.

==== 1500m freestyle ====
1. Paolo Vandini, Italy, 13:48.495.

2. Giuseppe Galantucci, Italy, 14:12.079.

3. Walter Olander, Sweden, 14:12.100.

4. Jurgen Kolenda, W. Germany, 14:43.935.

5. Thierry Henry, France, 15:14.295.

==== 100m immersion ====
1. Jurgen Kolenda, W. Germany, 39.941.

2. Dario Broglia, Italy, 40.695.

3. Thierry Lasbleye, France, 41.255.

4. Clemens Franck, W. Germany, 42.142.

5. Sandro Sola, Italy, 42.586.

6. Peter Svenson, Sweden, 45.028.

7. Mickel Zorte, France, 45.225.

8. Clemens Henry, France, 45.991.

9. Walter Olander, Sweden, 46.976.

10. Sven Olander, Sweden, 49.459.

=== Women ===
==== 50m apnoea ====
1. Cristiana Covoni, Italy, 19.937.

2. Monica Crovetti, Italy, 20.935.

3. Anne Menguy, France, 21.021.

4. Marina Beck, W. Germany, 22.036.

5. Anette Thorsell, Sweden, 22.642.

6. Marion Collot, France, 22.865.

7. Maria Gustafson, Sweden, 26.323.

==== 100m freestyle ====
1. Anne Menguy, France, 49.205.

2. Christiana Govoni, Italy, 49.263.

3. Anne-Marie Rouchon, France, 49.605.

4. Monica Crovetti, Italy, 49.653.

5. Marion Collot, France, 50.746.

6. Marina Beck, W. Germany, 50.814.

7. Anette Thorsell, Sweden, 51.893.

8. Anke Goldner, W. Germany, 53.177.

9. Maria Gustafson, Sweden, 55.753.

==== 200m freestyle ====
1. Anna-Marie Rouchon, France, 1:45.527.

2. Anne Menguy, France, 1:50.414.

3. Marion Collot, France, 1:50.450.

4. Monica Crovetti, Italy, 1:50.882.

5. Marina Beck, W. Germany, 1:51.956.

6. Anette Thorsell, Sweden, 1:57.632.

==== 400m freestyle ====
1. Anne Rouchon, France, 3:42.81.

2. Monica Crovetti, Italy, 3:53.43.

3. Marina Beck, W. Germany, 4:01.70.

4. Pia Strand, Sweden, 4:07.27.

==== 800m freestyle ====
1. Ana-Marie Rouchon, France, 7:45.878.

2. Marion Collot, France, 8:12.129.

3. Monica Crovetti, Italy, 8:26.652.

4. Pia Strand, Sweden, 8:28.317.

==== 100m immersion ====
1. Cristina Govini, Italy, 46.569.

2. Anne Menguy, France, 48.541.

3. Marina Beck, W. Germany, 51.156.

4. Carina Blomberg, Sweden, 54.407.

5. Maria Gustafson, Sweden, 58.292.
