= Ukraine at the 2009 World Games =

Ukraine at the World Games 2009
- IOC code: UKR
- NOC: National Olympic Committee of Ukraine

in Kaohsiung, Taiwan 16 July 2009 – 26 July 2009
- Medals Ranked 6th: Gold 9 Silver 12 Bronze 10 Total 31

World Games appearances (overview)
- 1993; 1997; 2001; 2005; 2009; 2013; 2017; 2022; 2025

Ukraine competed at the 2009 World Games in Kaohsiung, Taiwan, from 16 to 26 July 2009. Ukraine has qualified the national beach handball team for the women's tournament. Ukrainian athletes competed also in acrobatic gymnastics, bodybuilding, dancesport, dragon boat, finswimming, ju-jitsu, powerlifting, rhythmic gymnastics, sport climbing, sumo, trampoline gymnastics, tug of war, and water skiing. For the first time since the inception of the sport, Ukraine did not compete in orienteering. The team did not compete in squash and wushu.

== Medalists ==
=== Main programme ===
Medal	Name	Sport	Event
Gold	Mykola Cherbak; Serhiy Popov	Acrobatic gymnastics	Men's pairs
Gold	Alevtyna Tytarenko	Bodybuilding	Women's fitness
Gold	Ihor Soroka	Finswimming	Men's 50 m apnoea
Gold	Viktor Panov; Dmytro Shekera; Ihor Soroka; Dmytro Sydorenko	Finswimming	Men's 4 x 100 m surface relay
Gold	Serhiy Pevnev	Powerlifting	Men's heavyweight
Gold	Larysa Soloviova	Powerlifting	Women's heavyweight
Gold	Iryna Yavorska	Powerlifting	Women's super heavyweight
Gold	Alina Boykova	Sumo	Women's lightweight
Gold	Iuliia Domchevska; Olena Movchan	Trampoline gymnastics	Women's synchro
Silver	Viacheslav Makohon	Bodybuilding	Men's 70 kg
Silver	Dmytro Sydorenko	Finswimming	Men's 100 m surface
Silver	Arkadiy Shalokha	Powerlifting	Men's lightweight
Silver	Andriy Naniev	Powerlifting	Men's middleweight
Silver	Oleksandr Shepel	Powerlifting	Men's super heavyweight
Silver	Tetyana Prymenchuk	Powerlifting	Women's middleweight
Silver	Anna Bessonova	Rhythmic gymnastics	Rope
Silver	Anna Bessonova	Rhythmic gymnastics	Ball
Silver	Anna Bessonova	Rhythmic gymnastics	Ribbon
Silver	Maryna Pryshchepa	Sumo	Women's middleweight
Silver	Olha Davydko	Sumo	Women's heavyweight
Silver	Olha Davydko	Sumo	Women's openweight
Bronze	Andriy Bilozor; Denys Kriuchkov; Andrii Lytvak; Roman Urazbakiyev	Acrobatic gymnastics	Men's groups
Bronze	Kateryna Kalyta; Yuliya Odintsova; Natalia Vinnyk	Acrobatic gymnastics	Women's groups
Bronze	Nataliia Dichkovska	Bodybuilding	Women's 55 kg
Bronze	Olha Shliakhovska	Finswimming	Women's 200 m surface
Bronze	Olha Shliakhovska	Finswimming	Women's 400 m surface
Bronze	Valeriy Karpov	Powerlifting	Men's super heavyweight
Bronze	Zhanna Ivanova	Powerlifting	Women's middleweight
Bronze	Maksym Styenkovyy	Sport climbing	Men's speed
Bronze	Kostiantyn Iermakov	Sumo	Men's middleweight
Bronze	Viktor Kyforenko	Trampoline gymnastics	Men's tumbling

== Doping sanctions ==
On 26 October 2009, the IWGA announced sanctions against the following Ukrainian competitors:

- Beila Balog, middleweight gold medalist, who tested positive twice on various anabolic steroids, diuretics and SERMs – disqualification of results at the 2009 World Games, forfeiture of medals and permanent lifetime suspension from The World Games;
- Oleksandr Bilous, heavyweight gold medalist, who tested positive on various masking agents/diuretics and testosterone – disqualification of results at the 2009 World Games, forfeiture of medals and permanent lifetime suspension from The World Games.

== Dragon boat ==
Ukraine did not register to compete in the 1000 m race.

Athlete	Event	Heats		Repechage		Semifinals		Final	
Athlete	Event	Result	Rank	Result	Rank	Result	Rank	Result	Rank
Andriy Pohribnyi; Vlada Kosytska; Oleh Hordiichuk; Aliona Slyva; Oleksandr Kosarev; Yuriy Sivash; Nataliia Hlushko; Volodymyr Tibabishev; Nataliia Kravtsova; Mykhailo Skyba; Yevhen Bazhenkov; Vitaliy Myronov; Nataliia Hordiienko; Serhii Sanchenko; Yevhen Lokh; Olena Gudzhyl; Anastasiia Antonenko; Dmytro Drachuk; Yuliia Vyzhevska; Yevhen Kostomakha; Yuriy Stepanovych	200 m	57.92	4 q R	56.45	3 Q SF	58.43	5 q FB	1:00.17	9
Andriy Pohribnyi; Vlada Kosytska; Oleh Hordiichuk; Aliona Slyva; Oleksandr Kosarev; Yuriy Sivash; Nataliia Hlushko; Volodymyr Tibabishev; Nataliia Kravtsova; Mykhailo Skyba; Yevhen Bazhenkov; Vitaliy Myronov; Nataliia Hordiienko; Serhii Sanchenko; Yevhen Lokh; Olena Gudzhyl; Anastasiia Antonenko; Dmytro Drachuk; Yuliia Vyzhevska; Yevhen Kostomakha; Yuriy Stepanovych	500 m	DNS		Did not advance					
Andriy Pohribnyi; Vlada Kosytska; Oleh Hordiichuk; Aliona Slyva; Oleksandr Kosarev; Yuriy Sivash; Nataliia Hlushko; Volodymyr Tibabishev; Nataliia Kravtsova; Mykhailo Skyba; Yevhen Bazhenkov; Vitaliy Myronov; Nataliia Hordiienko; Serhii Sanchenko; Yevhen Lokh; Olena Gudzhyl; Anastasiia Antonenko; Dmytro Drachuk; Yuliia Vyzhevska; Yevhen Kostomakha; Yuriy Stepanovych	2000 m	DNS		Did not advance					

== Ju-jitsu ==
Men

Athlete	Event	Quarterfinals	BM quarterfinals	Semifinals	BM semifinals	Final/Bronze medal bout	
Athlete	Event	Opposition Result	Opposition Result	Opposition Result	Opposition Result	Opposition Result	Rank
Ivan Nastenko	77 kg	Krajewski (POL); W	Bye	Staller (GER); L	Tleumbetov (KAZ); L	Did not advance	
Leonid Rubtsov	94 kg	Parisi (FRA); L	Bye	Did not advance	Covyn (BEL); W	Parisi (FRA); L	4

== External sources ==
- Ukraine's medal at the 2009 World Games (list at the official website of the Games)
