= Tikhmenevo =

Tikhmenevo may refer to:

- Tikhmenevo, Sakhalin Oblast, a former urban-type settlement in Sakhalin Oblast, Russia; since 2005—a settlement of rural type
- Tikhmenevo, Yaroslavl Oblast, a former urban-type settlement in Yaroslavl Oblast, Russia; since 1999—a settlement of rural type
- Tikhmenevo, name of several other rural localities in Russia
