= Françoise Harteveld =

Dutch judoka

Personal information
- Born: 26 March 1977 (age 49)
- Occupation: Judoka

Sport
- Sport: Judo
Medal record
Women's judo
Representing Netherlands
European Championships
Gold medal – first place	1998 Oviedo	Open class
Silver medal – second place	1997 Ostend	Open class
Bronze medal – third place	1999 Bratislava	Open class
Bronze medal – third place	2002 Maribor	+78 kg
European Junior Championships
Gold medal – first place	1992 Jerusalem	+72 kg
Gold medal – first place	1995 Valladolid	+72 kg
Silver medal – second place	1993 Arnhem	+72 kg
Silver medal – second place	1994 Lisbon	+72 kg

Profile at external databases
- JudoInside.com: 45

Françoise Harteveld (born 26 March 1977 in Maassluis, South Holland) is a Dutch judoka. She began her judo career at the age of 3 at Budosport Mahorokan in Maassluis. Coos Henneveld was her mentor and taught her all her skills. Later, his son Rob Henneveld was her coach.

In 2006, she took up amateur sumo, and at her first tournament she ranked in the top 5 at the World Sumo Championships in Osaka. After her start in this other traditional Japanese sport, she won three silver medals in a row at the 2007 World Championships in Changmai, 2008 in Rakvere and 2010 in Warsaw.

Participant in Olympic Team during Qualification for Sydney 2000 & Athens 2004, 4x Sportswoman of the Year of the City Maassluis 2003 / 2008 / 2011 / 2012, Awarded with the Bowl of the City Maassluis 1998, Winner of the Sports Career Award of the City Maassluis 2015, Awarded with the Golden Citizenship "Gouden Erepenning der Gemeente Maassluis".

Other medals: World University Championships 2nd (2000) 3rd (1996/1998/2000), 5th World Judo Championships (1997) 7th (1999/2001/2003), European Team Championships 3rd (2000), and European Club Cup Final 3rd (1999). Winner of the National Championships Women Team in Belgium (Participant/Coach) – Judo (2009/2010/2012/2013)

Silver at the European Championships – Judo Belt Wrestling

- 3rd World Championships – Sumo – (2012)
- 1st European Championships – Sumo – (2012) Heavy & Open
- 3rd European Championships – Sumo – (2011) Heavy & Open
- 2nd World Championships – Sumo – (2010)
- 4th Combat Games Beijing – Sumo (2010)
- 1st Europe Cup Teams – Sumo (2010)
- 2nd European Championships – Sumo (2010)
- 1st Europe Cup Teams – Sumo (2009)
- Semi-final World Games Kaohsiung (2009) – Sumo
- 2nd World Championships – Sumo – (2008)
- 2nd World Championships – Sumo – (2007)
- 3rd World Championships Teams – Sumo – (2007)
- 3rd European Games – Sumo – (2007)
- 3rd European Championships – Sumo – (2007)
- 1st Barcis Cup – Sumo (2009/2010)
- 1st Milan Open – Sumo – (2007/2008/2009/2010/2011)
- 2nd Erd Cup – Sumo – (2011/2012)

== Achievements ==
Year	Tournament	Place	Weight class
2003	European Championships	7th	Heavyweight (+78 kg)
2003	World Championships	7th	Heavyweight (+78 kg)
2002	European Championships	3rd	Heavyweight (+78 kg)
2001	World Championships	7th	Heavyweight (+78 kg)
2001	World Championships	7th	Open class
2000	European Championships	5th	Heavyweight (+78 kg)
1999	European Championships	3rd	Open class
1999	World Championships	7th	Open class
1998	European Championships	5th	Heavyweight (+78 kg)
1998	European Championships	1st	Open class
1997	European Championships	2nd	Open class
1997	World Championships	5th	Open class
