= Masking agent =

Chemical reagent with chemical interference properties

A masking agent is a reagent used in chemical analysis which reacts with chemical species that may interfere in the analysis.

In sports a masking agent is used to hide or prevent detection of a banned substance or illegal drug like anabolic steroids or stimulants. Diuretics are the simplest form of masking agent and work by enhancing water loss via urine excretion and thus diluting the urine, which results in lower concentrations of the banned substance as more of it is being excreted from the body making it more difficult for laboratories to detect.
