= Zhanna Ivanova =

Russian politician

- Жанна Иванова

Russian Federation Senator from Sakhalin oblast
- In office 29 June 2012 – 31 December 2015
- Preceded by: Boris Agapov
- Succeeded by: Dmitry Mezentsev

Personal details
- Born: Zhanna Yannovna Ivanova; 12 October 1964 (age 62) Chita, Russian SFSR, Soviet Union
- Party: United Russia

Zhanna Yanovna Ivanova (Russian: Жанна Яновна Иванова; born 12 October 1964), is a Russian politician who was a member of the Federation Council from the Sakhalin Oblast from 2012 to 2015.

== Biography ==
Zhanna Ivanova was born in Chita on 12 October 1964.

After graduating from Leonidov Secondary School, she entered the Sakhalin State Pedagogical Institute, which she finished in 1986. In that same year, she worked at a secondary school in Tikhmenevo.

In 1988, at the age of 24, she was elected as a deputy of the Tikhmenevsky village Council of People's Deputies, and the next year, at the age of 25, she was appointed deputy director of the Blue Spruce children's health complex.

At the beginning of January 1994, she became director of Blue Spruce LLC. Under Ivanova's leadership, it was not only possible to preserve the children's health complex, but to make it one of the best children's institutions on Sakhalin. She was the president of the Yuzhno-Sakhalin local public fund "Do Good" and chairman of the board of the Sakhalin regional branch of the all-Russian public organization "Union of Women of Russia".

In October 2000, Ivanova was elected as a member of the Sakhalin Oblast Duma of the third convocation, and in January 2002, she was the chairman of the standing commission on education, science, sports and youth affairs.

As a member of parliament, she received a second higher education in law and a third in the specialty of state municipal administration.

In 2004, she graduated from the Baikal State University of Economics and Law. She was reelected to the regional parliament in October 2004, from the electoral bloc, "For a decent life and social justice." She was deputy chairman of the Sakhalin Regional Duma, chairman of the social policy committee and co-chairman of the youth parliamentary center at the Sakhalin Regional Duma.

In October 2008, she was elected as a member of the Sakhalin Parliament for the third time, while she joined the United Russia party.

On 29 June 2012, Governor of Sakhalin Oblast Aleksandr Khoroshavin signed a Decree, appointing Ivanova to membership of the Federation Council, representing the executive authority of the Sakhalin Oblast. She was replaced by her successor, Dmitry Mezentsev on 31 December 2015.

On 15 January 2016, Ivanova was detained and charged for tax evasion.

The Investigative Committee of the Russia has not yet commented on news agency reports about the initiation of a criminal case against Zhanna Ivanova, according to media reports. Ivanova, who had been arrested in Moscow is now under recognizance not to leave.

Ivanova herself also did not comment on the publications in the media, suggesting that they contact her lawyer.

Immediately after her arrest, she was suspended from the United Russia party.
