= Jarosław Olech =

Polish powerlifter

Medal record

Men's Powerlifting

Representing Poland

World Games
Gold medal – first place	2009 Kaohsiung	Middleweight
Gold medal – first place	2013 Cali	Middleweight
Gold medal – first place	2017 Wrocław	Middleweight

Jarosław Olech (born 6 January 1974 in Pawłów) is a Polish powerlifter.

== Career ==
Jarosław is a three-times World Games gold medalist in the Men's Middleweight Powerlifting event. He has won the world title at the International Powerlifting Federation seventeen consecutive times in his lifting class from 2002 to 2018. He currently has won eighteen titles, earning his latest in 2023.
