= Achim Grabowski =

German ten-pin bowler

Achim Grabowski is a German ten-pin bowler. He finished 5th in the combined rankings at the 2006 AMF World Cup. During the final round he finished in 4th position. He has also won his first European Bowling Tour event in 2006 in Tilburg.
