= Philippines at the 2009 World Games =

Philippines at the World Games 2022
- IOC code: PHI

in Kaohsiung, Taiwan 16 – 26 July 2022
- Competitors: 9 in 4 sports
- Medals: Gold 0 Silver 0 Bronze 1 Total 1

World Games appearances (overview)
- 1981; 1985; 1989; 1993; 1997; 2001; 2005; 2009; 2013; 2017; 2022; 2025

The Philippines competed at the 2009 World Games in Kaohsiung, Taiwan (with the host competing as Chinese Taipei), from 16 to 26 July 2009.

== Medalists ==
Official

Medal	Name	Sport	Event	Date
Bronze	Liza del Rosario	Bowling	Women's singles	July 22

Invitational

Medal	Name	Sport	Event	Date
Silver	Mariane Mariano	Wushu	Women's –60 kg	July 23

== Competitors ==
Sports	Men	Women	Total	Events
Bowling	1	1	2	3
Cue sports	1	0	1	1
Dancesport	2	2	4	2
Powerlifting	0	1	1	1
Wushu	1	2	3	3
Total	5	6	11	0

== Bowling ==
Liza del Rosario won a bronze medal in the women's single event.

- Chester King
- Liza del Rosario

== Cue sports ==
Athlete	Event	Round of 16	Quarterfinals	Semifinals	Final	
Athlete	Event	Opposition Result	Opposition Result	Opposition Result	Opposition Result	Rank
Leonardo Didal	Nine-ball – men's singles	Jeong Y.H. (KOR); W 11–8	Souquet (GER); L 10–11	Did not advance		

== Dancesport ==
Athletes	Event	Round 1	Quarterfinal	Semifinal	Final	Rank
Latin	Charlea Lagaras; Ronnie Steeve Vergara	Did not advance				23
Standard	Emmanuel Reyes; Maria Rosete	Did not advance	—N/a	Did not advance		19

== Powerlifting ==
Athlete	Event	Squat		Bench		Deadlift		Total	Rank
Athlete	Event	Result	Rank	Result	Rank	Result	Rank	Total	Rank
Erlina Pecante	Women's super heavyweight	220	7	120	9	195.0	6	481.34	8

== Wushu ==
Wushu is an invitational sport.

Taolu

Athlete	Event	Event 1		Event 2		Total	Rank
Athlete	Event	Result	Rank	Result	Rank	Total	Rank
Willy Wang	Men's nanquan and nangun	DNS	—	—N/a		—	

Sanda

Athlete	Event	Semifinal	Final		Rank
Athlete	Event	Opposition Score	Opposition Score	Opposition Score	Rank
Mary Jane Estimar	Women's –52 kg	E M. (CHN); L 0–2	Tavakkoli (IRI); L 1–2	—N/a	4
Mariane Mariano	Women's –60 kg	—N/a	Kao Y.C (TPE); W 2–0	Karimi (IRI); L 1–2	2nd place, silver medalist(s)
