= Krista Pöllänen =

Finnish ten-pin bowler

Krista Pöllänen is a Finnish professional ten-pin bowler.

== Career highlights ==
EBT - End of year rankings
2002 - 9th
2003 - 14th
2004 - 34th
2007 - 13th
Top-3 finishes
2002 - 1st, Danish Masters
2002 - 2nd, Dutch Brunswick Open
2003 - 1st, Danish Masters
2007 - 2nd, Brunswick Ballmaster Open
2007 - 2nd, Catalonia Open-Trofeo Galasa
2007 - 1st, Trofeu Internacional Cintat de Barcelona
2008 - 1st, Brunswick Ballmaster Open
