= Poland at the 2009 World Games =

- IOC code: POL
- NOC: Polish Olympic Committee

in Kaohsiung, Taiwan 16 July 2009 – 26 July 2009
- Competitors: 24 in 8 sports
- Medals Ranked 26th: Gold 1 Silver 1 Bronze 2 Total 4

World Games appearances
- 1981; 1985; 1989; 1993; 1997; 2001; 2005; 2009; 2013; 2017; 2022

Poland competed at the 2009 World Games in Kaohsiung, Taiwan, from July 16, 2009 to July 26, 2009.

== Medalists ==
Medal	Name	Sport	Event	Date
Gold	Jarosław Olech	Powerlifting	Men's middleweight	25 July
Silver	Jacek Wiak	Powerlifting	Men's heavyweight	25 July
Bronze	Jan Wegiera	Powerlifting	Men's middleweight	25 July
Bronze	Edyta Witkowska	Sumo	Women's openweight	18 July

== Competitors ==
Sports	Men	Women	Total	Events
Air sports	1	0	1	1
Bodybuilding	1	0	1	1
Dancesport	4	4	8	3
Ju-jitsu	2	1	3	3
Powerlifting	4	0	4	3
Sport climbing	1	1	2	2
Sumo	1	1	2	4
Trampoline gymnastics	3	0	3	2
Total	17	7	24	19

== Air sports ==
Poland has qualified to the games one man.

Athlete	Event	R1	R2	R3	R4	R5	R6	Sum	Place
Jacek Klus	Parachuting accuracy landing	0.06	0.02	0.06	0.03	0.04	0.02	0.23	5

== Bodybuilding ==
Poland has qualified to the games one man.

Athlete	Event	Round 1		Final	
Athlete	Event	Points	Rank	Points	Rank
Mariusz Bałaziński	Men's 80 kg	24	5	20	4

== Dancesport ==
Poland has qualified to the games four pairs. Three of them entered main competition. Pair Kiszka/Garlicka was reserve pair in standard event.

Athletes	Event	Round 1	Round 2	Semifinal	Final
Marek Fiska; Kinga Jurecka	Latin	Q	Q	Q	5
Jacek Tarczyło; Anna Miadzielec	Rock'n'Roll	Q	N/A	Q	5
Wiktor Kiszka; Małgorzata Garlicka	Standard				
Marek Kosaty; Paulina Glazik	Standard	Q	Q	Q	5

== Ju-jitsu ==
Poland has qualified to the games two men and one woman.

Athlete	Event	Quarterfinals	Repechage quarterfinals	Semifinals	Repechage semifinals	Final / BM	
Athlete	Event	Opposition Score	Opposition Score	Opposition Score	Opposition Score	Opposition Score	Rank
Tomasz Krajewski	Men's fighting 77 kg	(Ukraine) Ivan Nastenko; L	(Chinese Taipei) Wu Chia-luan; L	Did not advance			
Tomasz Szewczak	Men's fighting 94 kg	(Russia) Sergey Kunashov; L	(Montenegro) Ivan Barac; W	N/A	(France) Vincent Parisi; L	Did not advance	
Martyna Bierońska	Women's fighting 55 kg	(Germany) Andrea Pflefka; W	N/A	(France) Michele Reydy; L	(Ukraine) Olga Pastushenko; W	(Kazakhstan) Aizhan Kukuzova; L	4

== Powerlifting ==
Poland has qualified to the games four men.

Athlete	Event	Squat	Bench press	Deadlift	Total weight	Total points	Rank
Dariusz Wszoła	Men's lightweight	245.0	165.0	210.0	620.0	568.42	4
Jarosław Olech	Men's middleweight	362.5	220.0	302.5	885.0	634.19	1st place, gold medalist(s)
Jan Wegiera	Men's middleweight	330.0	265.0	290.0	885.0	593.53	3rd place, bronze medalist(s)
Jacek Wiak	Men's heavyweight	385.0	260.0	320.0	965.0	590.29	2nd place, silver medalist(s)

== Sport climbing ==
Poland has qualified to the games one man and one woman.

Athlete	Event	Preliminary		Quarterfinals	Semifinals	Final / BM	
Athlete	Event	Time	Rank	Opposition Score	Opposition Score	Opposition Score	Rank
Łukasz Świrk	Men's speed	7.98	5	(Ukraine) Maksym Styenkovyy; L 8.27-7.76	Did not advance		
Edyta Ropek	Women's speed	11.06	3	(Russia) Olga Morozkina; L DNF-13.51	Did not advance		

== Sumo ==
Poland has qualified to the games one man and one woman.

Athlete	Event	1/48 finals	1/32 finals	1/48 Repechages	1/32 Repechages	1/16 finals	Quarterfinals	1/16 Repechages	Repechages quarterfinals	Semifinals	Repechages semifinals	Final / BM	
Athlete	Event	Opposition Score	Opposition Score	Opposition Score	Opposition Score	Opposition Score	Opposition Score	Opposition Score	Opposition Score	Opposition Score	Opposition Score	Opposition Score	Rank
Marcin Rozum	Men's middleweight	N/A				(United States) Kena Heffernan; L	Did not advance						
Marcin Rozum	Men's openweight	(United States) Douglas Cochran; W	(Japan) Katsuo Yoshida; L	Did not advance									
Edyta Witkowska	Women's heavyweight	N/A				(Chinese Taipei) Lee Pei-shan; W	(Russia) Ekaterina Keyb; L	N/A	(Hungary) Gyongyi Kallo; L	Did not advance			
Edyta Witkowska	Women's openweight	Bye	(Chinese Taipei) Lee Pei-shan; W	N/A		(Mongolia) Selenge Enkhzaya; W	(Japan) Yuka Ueta; L	N/A	(Mongolia) Dulmaa Yadmaa; W	N/A	(Netherlands) Françoise Harteveld; W	(Japan) Yuka Ueta; W	3rd place, bronze medalist(s)

== Trampoline gymnastics ==
Poland has qualified to the games three men.

Athlete	Event	Preliminary		Final	
Athlete	Event	Score	Rank	Score	Rank
Tomasz Adamczyk; Łukasz Tomaszewski	Men's synchronized trampoline	85.500	10	Did not advance	
Adrian Bryłka	Men's tumbling	65.300	7	64.500	5
