= List of World Sumo Championships medalists (men) =

This is a list of world championships medalists in amateur sumo.

The International Sumo Federation (ISF) is the governing body of amateur sumo in the world. The first Men's World Championship under the ISF was held in 1992.

== Men's Individual ==
=== Lightweight ===
Meet	Gold	Silver	Bronze
1992 Tokyo	(Japan) Akihiro Kiku	(Brazil) Tadashi Nagamine	(Egypt) Mohammad Nabil
1992 Tokyo	(Japan) Akihiro Kiku	(Brazil) Tadashi Nagamine	(Mongolia) Odvog Baljinnyam
1993 Tokyo	(Japan) Hitoshi Omura	(Argentina) Juan Manuel Matsubara	(Brazil) Kaneyoshi Ueno
1993 Tokyo	(Japan) Hitoshi Omura	(Argentina) Juan Manuel Matsubara	(Senegal) Ousmane Ndiaye
1994 Tokyo	(Mongolia) Bayanmunkh Gantogtoh	(Sweden) Martin Lidberg	(United States) Nobuo Tsuchiya
1994 Tokyo	(Mongolia) Bayanmunkh Gantogtoh	(Sweden) Martin Lidberg	(Japan) Shin Ogawa
1995 Tokyo	(Mongolia) Agvaansamdan Suhbat	(Senegal) Moussa Sall	(Brazil) Alexandre Takeo Sato
1995 Tokyo	(Mongolia) Agvaansamdan Suhbat	(Senegal) Moussa Sall	(Denmark) Henrik Buchholtz
1996 Tokyo	(Japan) Hitoshi Omura	(Russia) Valeri Bakatov	(Mongolia) Agvaansamdan Suhbat
1996 Tokyo	(Japan) Hitoshi Omura	(Russia) Valeri Bakatov	(Senegal) Moussa Sall
1997 Tokyo	(Mongolia) Agvaansamdan Suhbat	(Brazil) Márcio Tadashi Takakura	(Norway) Martin Dalsbotten
1997 Tokyo	(Mongolia) Agvaansamdan Suhbat	(Brazil) Márcio Tadashi Takakura	(Australia) Morgan Endicott-Davies
1998 Tokyo	(Bulgaria) Svetoslav Binev	(Japan) Atsuhiro Ibata	(Germany) Peer Schmidt-Düwiger
1998 Tokyo	(Bulgaria) Svetoslav Binev	(Japan) Atsuhiro Ibata	(Brazil) Antenor Yuzo Sato
1999 Riesa	(Bulgaria) Svetoslav Binev	(Russia) Kandemir Kuular	(United Kingdom) Kevin Emslie
1999 Riesa	(Bulgaria) Svetoslav Binev	(Russia) Kandemir Kuular	(Japan) Hitoshi Omura
2000 São Paulo	(Germany) Peer Schmidt-Düwiger	(Finland) Tomi Rajamäki	(Hungary) János Kismóni
2000 São Paulo	(Germany) Peer Schmidt-Düwiger	(Finland) Tomi Rajamäki	(Russia) Kandemir Kovoular
2001 Aomori	(Japan) Chohei Kimura	(Finland) Tomi Rajamäki	(Estonia) Anti Peet
2001 Aomori	(Japan) Chohei Kimura	(Finland) Tomi Rajamäki	(Hungary) János Kismóni
2002 Wrocław	(Brazil) Cláudio Ikemori	(Hungary) János Kismóni	(Russia) Igor Kurinnoy
2002 Wrocław	(Brazil) Cláudio Ikemori	(Hungary) János Kismóni	(Bulgaria) Stilian Georgiev
2004 Riesa	(Ukraine) Vitaliy Tikhenko	(Brazil) Cláudio Ikemori	(Poland) Artur Michalkiewicz
2004 Riesa	(Ukraine) Vitaliy Tikhenko	(Brazil) Cláudio Ikemori	(Russia) Igor Kurinnoy
2005 Osaka	(Ukraine) Vitaliy Tikhenko	(Thailand) Jakkarapong Choarungmetee	(Bulgaria) Stilian Georgiev
2005 Osaka	(Ukraine) Vitaliy Tikhenko	(Thailand) Jakkarapong Choarungmetee	(Finland) Sami Ylä-Kero
2006 Osaka	(Japan) Takaharu Nagasawa	(Kazakhstan) Niyaz Gunyashev	(Russia) Igor Kurinnoy
2006 Osaka	(Japan) Takaharu Nagasawa	(Kazakhstan) Niyaz Gunyashev	(Ukraine) Vitaliy Tikhenko
2007 Chiang Mai	(Hungary) Sándor Bárdosi	(Bulgaria) Stilian Georgiev	(Ukraine) Vitalii Oliinyk
2007 Chiang Mai	(Hungary) Sándor Bárdosi	(Bulgaria) Stilian Georgiev	(Russia) Nachyn Mongush
2008 Rakvere	(Japan) Takashi Shimako	(Bulgaria) Stilian Georgiev	(United States) Trent Sabo
2008 Rakvere	(Japan) Takashi Shimako	(Bulgaria) Stilian Georgiev	(Russia) Nachyn Mongush
2010 Warsaw	(Bulgaria) Stilian Georgiev	(Azerbaijan) Rashad Kazimov	(Japan) Takashi Shimako
2010 Warsaw	(Bulgaria) Stilian Georgiev	(Azerbaijan) Rashad Kazimov	(Netherlands) Olle Overbosch
2012 Hong Kong	(Mongolia) Gantugs Rentsendorj	(Bulgaria) Stilian Georgiev	(Azerbaijan) Namig Sadigov
2012 Hong Kong	(Mongolia) Gantugs Rentsendorj	(Bulgaria) Stilian Georgiev	(Poland) Aron Rozum
2014 Taoyuan	(Japan) Yūya Nakamura	(Poland) Aron Rozum	(Russia) Andrei Mongush
2014 Taoyuan	(Japan) Yūya Nakamura	(Poland) Aron Rozum	(Bulgaria) Pencho Dochev
2015 Osaka	(Japan) Yūya Nakamura	(Bulgaria) Stilian Georgiev	(Russia) Batyr Altyev
2015 Osaka	(Japan) Yūya Nakamura	(Bulgaria) Stilian Georgiev	(Poland) Aron Rozum
2016 Ulaanbaatar	(Russia) Batyr Altyev	(Egypt) Fathy Mohamed Mail Abou El Rokb	(Japan) Isao Shibaoka
2016 Ulaanbaatar	(Russia) Batyr Altyev	(Egypt) Fathy Mohamed Mail Abou El Rokb	(Mongolia) Badral Baasandorj
2018 Taoyuan	(Ukraine) Sviatoslav Semykras	(Russia) Subudai Shoidun	(Egypt) Abdelrahman Elsefy
2018 Taoyuan	(Ukraine) Sviatoslav Semykras	(Russia) Subudai Shoidun	(Bulgaria) Pencho Dochev
2019 Osaka	(Russia) Georgy Abdula-Zade	Doping (Note: Gold medal in lightweight category was originally won by Sviatoslav Semykras of Ukraine, but in later years he was disqualified of his title because of doping violations.)	(Bulgaria) Pencho Dochev
2019 Osaka	(Russia) Georgy Abdula-Zade	Doping	(Egypt) Abdelrahman Elsefy
2023 Tokyo	(Ukraine) Sviatoslav Semykras	(Azerbaijan) Royal Aghamaliyev	(Japan) Tomohisa Oku
2023 Tokyo	(Ukraine) Sviatoslav Semykras	(Azerbaijan) Royal Aghamaliyev	(Bulgaria) Pencho Dochev
2024 Krotoszyn	(Ukraine) Demid Karachenko	(Poland) Patryk Swora	(Azerbaijan) Abdullah Sharif
2024 Krotoszyn	(Ukraine) Demid Karachenko	(Poland) Patryk Swora	(Bulgaria) Pencho Dochev
2025 Bangkok	(Ukraine) Sviatoslav Semykras	(Kyrgyzstan) Georgy Abdulazade	(Japan) Hidemune Okutani
2025 Bangkok	(Ukraine) Sviatoslav Semykras	(Kyrgyzstan) Georgy Abdulazade	(Brazil) Genilton Tibúrcio da Silva
2026 Baku	(Azerbaijan) Amrah Shafiyev	(Kyrgyzstan) Georgy Abdulazade	(Ukraine) Sviatoslav Semykras
2026 Baku	(Azerbaijan) Amrah Shafiyev	(Kyrgyzstan) Georgy Abdulazade	(Japan) Tomohisa Oku

=== Middleweight ===
Meet	Gold	Silver	Bronze
1993 Tokyo	(Japan) Akihiro Kiku	(Brazil) Fábio Shigenobu Kosaihira	(Mongolia) Odvog Baljinnyam
1993 Tokyo	(Japan) Akihiro Kiku	(Brazil) Fábio Shigenobu Kosaihira	(Australia) Milton Reedy
1994 Tokyo	(Japan) Ryōji Kumagai	(Germany) Eduard Grams	(Senegal) Moussa Sall
1994 Tokyo	(Japan) Ryōji Kumagai	(Germany) Eduard Grams	(Argentina) Jorge Charello
1995 Tokyo	(Japan) Ryōji Kumagai	(Russia) Evgueni Sleptsov	(Turkey) Ahmet Taşçı
1995 Tokyo	(Japan) Ryōji Kumagai	(Russia) Evgueni Sleptsov	(Colombia) Arnulfo Hernandez
1996 Tokyo	(Japan) Tatsurō Takahama	(Mongolia) Odvog Baljinnyam	(United Kingdom) Steve Pateman
1996 Tokyo	(Japan) Tatsurō Takahama	(Mongolia) Odvog Baljinnyam	(Brazil) Fábio Kazuo Ikemori
1997 Tokyo	(Japan) Tatsurō Takahama	(Brazil) Roberval Yuji Hayashi	(Estonia) Aap Uspenski
1997 Tokyo	(Japan) Tatsurō Takahama	(Brazil) Roberval Yuji Hayashi	(Fiji) Nacanieli Qerewaqa
1998 Tokyo	(Japan) Tatsurō Takahama	(Germany) Eduard Grams	(Finland) Petri Särkijärvi
1998 Tokyo	(Japan) Tatsurō Takahama	(Germany) Eduard Grams	(Mongolia) Bayanmunkh Gantogtoh
1999 Riesa	(Japan) Hideto Tsushima	(Estonia) Aap Uspenski	(Poland) Marek Paczków
1999 Riesa	(Japan) Hideto Tsushima	(Estonia) Aap Uspenski	(Bulgaria) Borislav Beltchev
2000 São Paulo	(Russia) Ayas Mongush	(Mongolia) Altangadas Khuchitbaatar	(Japan) Hideto Tsushima
2000 São Paulo	(Russia) Ayas Mongush	(Mongolia) Altangadas Khuchitbaatar	(Estonia) Aap Uspenski
2001 Aomori	(Russia) Ayas Mongush	(Estonia) Aap Uspenski	(Mongolia) Agvaansamdan Suhbat
2001 Aomori	(Russia) Ayas Mongush	(Estonia) Aap Uspenski	(Cuba) Luis Felipe Rodriguez Valera
2002 Wrocław	(Russia) David Tsallagov	(Poland) Marek Paczków	(Japan) Ryo Ikeura
2002 Wrocław	(Russia) David Tsallagov	(Poland) Marek Paczków	(Bulgaria) Todor Djurov
2004 Riesa	(Japan) Katsuo Yoshida	(Ukraine) Sergiy Pryadun	(Russia) David Tsallagov
2004 Riesa	(Japan) Katsuo Yoshida	(Ukraine) Sergiy Pryadun	(Poland) Marek Paczków
2005 Osaka	(Japan) Katsuo Yoshida	(Poland) Marek Paczków	(Mongolia) Agvaansamdan Suhbat
2005 Osaka	(Japan) Katsuo Yoshida	(Poland) Marek Paczków	(Netherlands) Saber Hussein
2006 Osaka	(Japan) Katsuo Yoshida	(Mongolia) Gantugs Rentsendorj	(Ukraine) Kostyantyn Yermakov
2006 Osaka	(Japan) Katsuo Yoshida	(Mongolia) Gantugs Rentsendorj	(Brazil) Alan de Souza Galvão
2007 Chiang Mai	(Japan) Katsuo Yoshida	(Bulgaria) Todor Dzurov	(Russia) Alan Bibilov
2007 Chiang Mai	(Japan) Katsuo Yoshida	(Bulgaria) Todor Dzurov	(Ukraine) Kostyantyn Yermakov
2008 Rakvere	(Japan) Katsuo Yoshida	(Ukraine) Kostyantyn Yermakov	(Russia) Atsamaz Kaziev
2008 Rakvere	(Japan) Katsuo Yoshida	(Ukraine) Kostyantyn Yermakov	(Brazil) Victor Zaragueta de Jesus Pastrello
2010 Warsaw	(Japan) Ryō Itō	(Russia) Atsamaz Kaziev	(Poland) Wojciech Poczta
2010 Warsaw	(Japan) Ryō Itō	(Russia) Atsamaz Kaziev	(Mongolia) Bat-Orshikh Ulziitogtokh
2012 Hong Kong	(Ukraine) Kostyantyn Yermakov	(Russia) Atsamaz Kaziev	(Brazil) Ricardo Tadashi Aoyama
2012 Hong Kong	(Ukraine) Kostyantyn Yermakov	(Russia) Atsamaz Kaziev	(Japan) Ryō Itō
2014 Taoyuan	(Japan) Kiyoyuki Noguchi	(Mongolia) Usukhbayar Ochirkhuu	(Russia) Eres Kara-Sal
2014 Taoyuan	(Japan) Kiyoyuki Noguchi	(Mongolia) Usukhbayar Ochirkhuu	(Ukraine) Kostyantyn Yermakov
2015 Osaka	(Russia) Atsamaz Kaziev	(Poland) Michał Luto	(Georgia (country)) Giorgi Meshvildishvili
2015 Osaka	(Russia) Atsamaz Kaziev	(Poland) Michał Luto	(Japan) Kiyoyuki Noguchi
2016 Ulaanbaatar	(Japan) Hayato Miwa	(Poland) Michał Luto	(Georgia (country)) Giorgi Meshvildishvili
2016 Ulaanbaatar	(Japan) Hayato Miwa	(Poland) Michał Luto	(Russia) Atsamaz Kaziev
2018 Taoyuan	(Mongolia) Badral Baasandorj	(Poland) Aron Rozum	(Finland) Oskari Riihioja
2018 Taoyuan	(Mongolia) Badral Baasandorj	(Poland) Aron Rozum	(Russia) Saiyn-Belek Tiuliush
2019 Osaka	(Mongolia) Badral Baasandorj	(Japan) Ryota Fukano	(Finland) Oskari Riihioja
2019 Osaka	(Mongolia) Badral Baasandorj	(Japan) Ryota Fukano	(Poland) Michał Luto
2023 Tokyo	(Ukraine) Yehor Krupskyi	(Japan) Kazuhiko Ryuyama	(Kyrgyzstan) Sulde Dongak
2023 Tokyo	(Ukraine) Yehor Krupskyi	(Japan) Kazuhiko Ryuyama	(Finland) Hannu Kulmala
2024 Krotoszyn	(Ukraine) Yehor Krupskyi	(Norway) Kim Erik Valentin Svensson	(Azerbaijan) Chingiz Samadov
2024 Krotoszyn	(Ukraine) Yehor Krupskyi	(Norway) Kim Erik Valentin Svensson	(Bulgaria) Ivan Blagoev
2025 Bangkok	(Mongolia) Ganbold Erdenesuren	(Ukraine) Anatolii Khliustin	(Bulgaria) Ivan Blagoev
2025 Bangkok	(Mongolia) Ganbold Erdenesuren	(Ukraine) Anatolii Khliustin	(Kyrgyzstan) Konstantin Abdulazade
2026 Baku	(Kyrgyzstan) Konstantin Abdulazade	(Hungary) Józsed Délceg	(Mongolia) Myagmar Batzorig
2026 Baku	(Kyrgyzstan) Konstantin Abdulazade	(Hungary) Józsed Délceg	(Ukraine) Demid Karachenko

=== Light Heavyweight ===
Meet	Gold	Silver	Bronze
2019 Osaka	(Russia) Konstantin Abdula-Zade	(Japan) Koju Osanai	(Ukraine) Vazha Daiauri
2019 Osaka	(Russia) Konstantin Abdula-Zade	(Japan) Koju Osanai	(Kyrgyzstan) Aibek Kasmanbetov
2023 Tokyo	(Ukraine) Vazha Daiauri	(Japan) Hayato Miwa	(Mongolia) Badral Baasandorj
2023 Tokyo	(Ukraine) Vazha Daiauri	(Japan) Hayato Miwa	(Poland) Aron Rozum
2024 Krotoszyn	(Mongolia) Badral Baasandorj	(Ukraine) Vazha Daiauri	(Japan) Hayato Miwa
2024 Krotoszyn	(Mongolia) Badral Baasandorj	(Ukraine) Vazha Daiauri	(Kyrgyzstan) Sulde Dongak
2025 Bangkok	(Mongolia) Badral Baasandorj	(Bulgaria) Simeon Stankovich	(Kyrgyzstan) Sulde Dongak
2025 Bangkok	(Mongolia) Badral Baasandorj	(Bulgaria) Simeon Stankovich	(Japan) Hayato Miwa
2026 Baku	(Bulgaria) Simeon Stankovich	(Hungary) Marcell Gyuricza	(Kyrgyzstan) Sulde Dongak
2026 Baku	(Bulgaria) Simeon Stankovich	(Hungary) Marcell Gyuricza	(Mongolia) Badral Baasandorj

=== Heavyweight ===
Meet	Gold	Silver	Bronze
1992 Tokyo	(Japan) Takeharu Dejima	(United States) Hideo Su'a	(Germany) Martin Vogt
1992 Tokyo	(Japan) Takeharu Dejima	(United States) Hideo Su'a	(Mongolia) Tsedendamba Bayarsaihan
1993 Tokyo	(Japan) Fumihito Tsuruga	(Mongolia) Tsedendamba Bayarsaihan	(Canada) Andrew Borodow
1993 Tokyo	(Japan) Fumihito Tsuruga	(Mongolia) Tsedendamba Bayarsaihan	(Russia) Khabil Biktachev
1994 Tokyo	(Japan) Keiji Tamiya	(New Zealand) Paul Kingi	(United Kingdom) Bill Etherington
1994 Tokyo	(Japan) Keiji Tamiya	(New Zealand) Paul Kingi	(Brazil) Renê da Silva Crespo
1995 Tokyo	(Japan) Naohito Saitō	(Germany) Jörg Brümmer	(Brazil) Fábio Shigenobu Kosaihira
1995 Tokyo	(Japan) Naohito Saitō	(Germany) Jörg Brümmer	(Canada) Andrew Borodow
1996 Tokyo	(Japan) Koichi Katō	(Canada) Andrew Borodow	(Nigeria) Emeka Baba Mutum Okeke
1996 Tokyo	(Japan) Koichi Katō	(Canada) Andrew Borodow	(Chinese Taipei) Yeh Kum-fang
1997 Tokyo	(Japan) Keiji Tamiya	(Chinese Taipei) Yeh Kum-fang	(Kazakhstan) Samat Romazanov
1997 Tokyo	(Japan) Keiji Tamiya	(Chinese Taipei) Yeh Kum-fang	(United States) Wayne Vierra
1998 Tokyo	(Germany) Jörg Brümmer	(Fiji) Nacanieli Qerewaqa	(Brazil) Marcos Santana
1998 Tokyo	(Germany) Jörg Brümmer	(Fiji) Nacanieli Qerewaqa	(Japan) Seiken Katō
1999 Riesa	(Japan) Takahisa Osanai	(Mongolia) Tsedendamba Bayarsaikhan	(Germany) Jörg Brümmer
1999 Riesa	(Japan) Takahisa Osanai	(Mongolia) Tsedendamba Bayarsaikhan	(Poland) Robert Paczków
2000 São Paulo	(Japan) Takahisa Osanai	(Germany) Jörg Brümmer	(Norway) Hans Borg
2000 São Paulo	(Japan) Takahisa Osanai	(Germany) Jörg Brümmer	(Brazil) Marcos Santana
2001 Aomori	(Poland) Robert Paczków	(Russia) Iouri Mildzikhov	(Bulgaria) Petar Stoyanov
2001 Aomori	(Poland) Robert Paczków	(Russia) Iouri Mildzikhov	(Cuba) Julio Cesar Diez Ochoa
2002 Wrocław	(Poland) Robert Paczków	(Russia) Iouri Mildzikhov	(Norway) Hans Borg
2002 Wrocław	(Poland) Robert Paczków	(Russia) Iouri Mildzikhov	(Mongolia) Tsedev Myagmarsuren
2004 Riesa	(Japan) Takayuki Ichihara	(Poland) Robert Paczków	(Bulgaria) Petar Stoyanov
2004 Riesa	(Japan) Takayuki Ichihara	(Poland) Robert Paczków	(Ukraine) Konstantyn Stryzhak
2005 Osaka	(Japan) Takayuki Ichihara	(Hungary) Dezső Libor	(Bulgaria) Hrist Hristov
2005 Osaka	(Japan) Takayuki Ichihara	(Hungary) Dezső Libor	(Russia) Alan Karaev
2006 Osaka	(Mongolia) Byambajav Ulambayar	(Russia) Alan Karaev	(Japan) Tomoki Mori
2006 Osaka	(Mongolia) Byambajav Ulambayar	(Russia) Alan Karaev	(Poland) Robert Paczków
2007 Chiang Mai	(Mongolia) Byambajav Ulambayar	(Japan) Hiroaki Tanaka	(Bulgaria) Petar Stoyanov
2007 Chiang Mai	(Mongolia) Byambajav Ulambayar	(Japan) Hiroaki Tanaka	(Russia) Artur Bagaev
2008 Rakvere	(Japan) Takashi Himeno	(Bulgaria) Petar Stoyanov	(Mongolia) Byambajav Ulambayar
2008 Rakvere	(Japan) Takashi Himeno	(Bulgaria) Petar Stoyanov	Doping
2010 Warsaw	(Hungary) Dezső Libor	(Russia) Alan Karaev	(Mongolia) Byambajav Ulambayar
2010 Warsaw	(Hungary) Dezső Libor	(Russia) Alan Karaev	(Japan) Hidemasa Meigetsuin
2012 Hong Kong	(Russia) Alan Karaev	(Ukraine) Dmytro Slepchenko	(Japan) Shōta Endō
2012 Hong Kong	(Russia) Alan Karaev	(Ukraine) Dmytro Slepchenko	(Mongolia) Byambajav Ulambayar
2014 Taoyuan	(Russia) Alan Karaev	(Ukraine) Yevhenii Orlov	(Mongolia) Byambajav Ulambayar
2014 Taoyuan	(Russia) Alan Karaev	(Ukraine) Yevhenii Orlov	(Bulgaria) Ivan Kachakov
2015 Osaka	(Japan) Ryōta Oyanagi	(Mongolia) Byambajav Ulambayar	(Brazil) Rui Aparecido de Sá Junior
2015 Osaka	(Japan) Ryōta Oyanagi	(Mongolia) Byambajav Ulambayar	(Georgia (country)) Avtandil Tsertsvadze
2016 Ulaanbaatar	(Russia) Vasily Margiev	(Japan) Kojiro Kurokawa	(Ukraine) Serhii Sokolovskyi
2016 Ulaanbaatar	(Russia) Vasily Margiev	(Japan) Kojiro Kurokawa	(Mongolia) Byambajav Ulambayar
2018 Taoyuan	(Russia) Vasily Margiev	(Mongolia) Davaajamts Nanjidsuren	(Poland) Mateusz Linka
2018 Taoyuan	(Russia) Vasily Margiev	(Mongolia) Davaajamts Nanjidsuren	(Japan) Seira Shiroyama
2019 Osaka	(Japan) Atsushi Igarashi	(Brazil) Rui Aparecido de Sá Junior	(Russia) Ruslan Bagaev
2019 Osaka	(Japan) Atsushi Igarashi	(Brazil) Rui Aparecido de Sá Junior	(Ukraine) Oleksandr Veresiuk
2023 Tokyo	(Japan) Naoya Kusano	(Mongolia) Naranbayar Khangai	(Georgia (country)) Lasha Jeladze
2023 Tokyo	(Japan) Naoya Kusano	(Mongolia) Naranbayar Khangai	(Poland) Jacek Piersiak
2024 Krotoszyn	(Georgia (country)) Lasha Jeladze	(Poland) Mateusz Linka	(Japan) Kosei Takeuchi
2024 Krotoszyn	(Georgia (country)) Lasha Jeladze	(Poland) Mateusz Linka	(Mongolia) Naranbayar Khangai
2025 Bangkok	(Japan) Kosei Takeuchi	(Georgia (country)) Lasha Jeladze	(Mongolia) Naranbayar Khangai
2025 Bangkok	(Japan) Kosei Takeuchi	(Georgia (country)) Lasha Jeladze	(Poland) Mateusz Linka
2026 Baku	(Japan) Haruto Asada	(Georgia (country)) Lasha Jeladze	(Ukraine) Oleksandr Veresiuk
2026 Baku	(Japan) Haruto Asada	(Georgia (country)) Lasha Jeladze	(Uzbekistan) Vladislav Buligin

=== Openweight ===
Meet	Gold	Silver	Bronze
1992 Tokyo	(Japan) Kazuo Saitō	(United States) Emmanuel Yarbrough	(Brazil) Renê da Silva Crespo
1992 Tokyo	(Japan) Kazuo Saitō	(United States) Emmanuel Yarbrough	(Germany) Jochen Plate
1993 Tokyo	(Japan) Sunao Yasu	(Mongolia) Badmanyambuu Bat-Erdene	(United States) Emmanuel Yarbrough
1993 Tokyo	(Japan) Sunao Yasu	(Mongolia) Badmanyambuu Bat-Erdene	(Brazil) Renê da Silva Crespo
1994 Tokyo	(Mongolia) Badmanyambuu Bat-Erdene	(United States) Emmanuel Yarbrough	(France) Fabrice Guenet
1994 Tokyo	(Mongolia) Badmanyambuu Bat-Erdene	(United States) Emmanuel Yarbrough	(Russia) Khabil Biktachev
1995 Tokyo	(United States) Emmanuel Yarbrough	(Japan) Taishi Goto	(Mongolia) Badmanyambuu Bat-Erdene
1995 Tokyo	(United States) Emmanuel Yarbrough	(Japan) Taishi Goto	(France) Fabrice Guenet
1996 Tokyo	(South Africa) Mark Robinson	(United States) Emmanuel Yarbrough	(Tonga) Tevita Vaiola Falevai
1996 Tokyo	(South Africa) Mark Robinson	(United States) Emmanuel Yarbrough	(France) Fabrice Guenet
1997 Tokyo	(Japan) Naohito Saitō	(Egypt) Ahmed Bally	(South Africa) Mark Robinson
1997 Tokyo	(Japan) Naohito Saitō	(Egypt) Ahmed Bally	(Brazil) Flávio Tooru Kosaihira
1998 Tokyo	(Japan) Keiji Tamiya	(South Africa) Mark Robinson	(Germany) Thorsten Scheibler
1998 Tokyo	(Japan) Keiji Tamiya	(South Africa) Mark Robinson	(Poland) Jacek Jaracz
1999 Riesa	(Georgia (country)) Levan Ebanoidze	(Japan) Tōru Kakizoe	(Hungary) Dezső Libor
1999 Riesa	(Georgia (country)) Levan Ebanoidze	(Japan) Tōru Kakizoe	(Russia) Iouri Goloubovski
2000 São Paulo	(Japan) Tōru Kakizoe	(Germany) Thorsten Scheibler	(Georgia (country)) Levan Ebanoidze
2000 São Paulo	(Japan) Tōru Kakizoe	(Germany) Thorsten Scheibler	(Finland) Jorma Korhonen
2001 Aomori	(Germany) Thorsten Scheibler	(Mongolia) Tsedendamba Bayarsaikhan	(Russia) Iouri Goloubovski
2001 Aomori	(Germany) Thorsten Scheibler	(Mongolia) Tsedendamba Bayarsaikhan	(Norway) Ronny Almann
2002 Wrocław	(Russia) Alan Karaev	(Mongolia) Batjargal Ganbat	(Germany) Thorsten Scheibler
2002 Wrocław	(Russia) Alan Karaev	(Mongolia) Batjargal Ganbat	(Georgia (country)) Levan Ebanoidze
2004 Riesa	(Japan) Keisho Shimoda	(Germany) Thorsten Scheibler	(Poland) Jacek Jaracz
2004 Riesa	(Japan) Keisho Shimoda	(Germany) Thorsten Scheibler	(Brazil) Geraldo Katsushi Fujishiro
2005 Osaka	(Germany) Thorsten Scheibler	(Japan) Keisyo Shimoda	(Mongolia) Batzorig Chogsom
2005 Osaka	(Germany) Thorsten Scheibler	(Japan) Keisyo Shimoda	(Bulgaria) Petar Stoyanov
2006 Osaka	(Russia) Alan Gabaraev	(Czech Republic) Jaroslav Poříz	(Mongolia) Myagmarsuren Tsedev
2006 Osaka	(Russia) Alan Gabaraev	(Czech Republic) Jaroslav Poříz	(Japan) Takayuki Ichihara
2007 Chiang Mai	(Russia) Alan Karaev	(Japan) Yasunari Miyamoto	(Egypt) Hany Hassanin
2007 Chiang Mai	(Russia) Alan Karaev	(Japan) Yasunari Miyamoto	(Mongolia) Myagmarsuren Tsedev
2008 Rakvere	(Mongolia) Naranbat Gankhuyag	Doping	(Poland) Robert Paczków
2008 Rakvere	(Mongolia) Naranbat Gankhuyag	Doping	(Russia) Alan Karaev
2010 Warsaw	(Russia) Vasily Margiev	(Bulgaria) Hristo Hristov	(Mongolia) Ganbat Batjargal
2010 Warsaw	(Russia) Vasily Margiev	(Bulgaria) Hristo Hristov	(Japan) Masahiro Yamaguchi
2012 Hong Kong	(Mongolia) Naranbat Gankhuyag	(Japan) Mutoshi Matsunaga	(Netherlands) Haitham Alsadi
2012 Hong Kong	(Mongolia) Naranbat Gankhuyag	(Japan) Mutoshi Matsunaga	(Ukraine) Oleksandr Veresiuk
2014 Taoyuan	(Mongolia) Turbold Baasansuren	(Ukraine) Oleksandr Veresiuk	(Japan) Daiki Nakamura
2014 Taoyuan	(Mongolia) Turbold Baasansuren	(Ukraine) Oleksandr Veresiuk	(Egypt) Hossam Fathi Omar Misbah
2015 Osaka	(Japan) Sōichirō Kurokawa	(Egypt) Hossam Fathi Omar Misbah	(Poland) Jacek Piersiak
2015 Osaka	(Japan) Sōichirō Kurokawa	(Egypt) Hossam Fathi Omar Misbah	(Mongolia) Turbold Baasansuren
2016 Ulaanbaatar	(Mongolia) Turbold Baasansuren	(Russia) Eduard Kudzoev	(United States) Roy Sims
2016 Ulaanbaatar	(Mongolia) Turbold Baasansuren	(Russia) Eduard Kudzoev	(Japan) Sōichirō Kurokawa
2018 Taoyuan	(Russia) Eduard Kudzoev	(Poland) Jacek Piersiak	(Ukraine) Oleksandr Veresiuk
2018 Taoyuan	(Russia) Eduard Kudzoev	(Poland) Jacek Piersiak	(Japan) Tomohiro Saigo
2019 Osaka	(Mongolia) Batsuuri Namsraijav	(Japan) Kojiro Kurokawa	(Hungary) Robert Kerstner
2019 Osaka	(Mongolia) Batsuuri Namsraijav	(Japan) Kojiro Kurokawa	(Russia) Eduard Kudzoev
2023 Tokyo	(Ukraine) Oleksandr Veresiuk	(Mongolia) Batsuuri Namsraijav	(Estonia) Alonso Gonzalez Margalef
2023 Tokyo	(Ukraine) Oleksandr Veresiuk	(Mongolia) Batsuuri Namsraijav	(Japan) Taisei Matsuzono
2024 Krotoszyn	(Japan) Shun Ikeda	(Poland) Jacek Piersiak	(Georgia (country)) Badri Khatiskatsi
2024 Krotoszyn	(Japan) Shun Ikeda	(Poland) Jacek Piersiak	(Ukraine) Oleksandr Veresiuk
2025 Bangkok	(Japan) Shun Ikeda	(Ukraine) Oleksandr Veresiuk	(Mongolia) Bayarbold Batkhuyag
2025 Bangkok	(Japan) Shun Ikeda	(Ukraine) Oleksandr Veresiuk	(United States) Dominus Davis-Williams
2026 Baku	(Ukraine) Vazha Daiauri	(Georgia (country)) Zura Tsikoradze	(Hungary) Erik Márk Szilágyi
2026 Baku	(Ukraine) Vazha Daiauri	(Georgia (country)) Zura Tsikoradze	(Japan) Shun Ikeda

== Men's Teams ==
Year	1st place	2nd place	3rd	3rd
1992	Japan	United States	Mongolia	France
1993	Japan	United States	Mongolia	Russia
1994	Japan	United States	Brazil	Mongolia
1995	Japan	Mongolia	Brazil	United States
1996	Japan	Mongolia	Finland	Germany
1997	Japan	Finland	United States	Estonia
1998	Japan	United States	Germany	Poland
1999	Japan	Poland	Russia	United States
2000	Germany	Japan	Russia	Poland
2001	Japan	Germany	Mongolia	Norway
2002	Japan	Norway	Poland	Hungary
2004	Japan	Bulgaria	Germany	Hungary
2005	Japan	Bulgaria	Russia	Norway
2006	Russia	Japan	Mongolia	Poland
2007	Russia	Japan	Ukraine	Mongolia
2008	Russia	Japan	Poland	Mongolia
2010	Japan	Russia	Ukraine	Mongolia
2012	Japan	Russia	Ukraine	Mongolia
2014	Japan	Russia	Ukraine	Mongolia
2015	Russia	Mongolia	Georgia	Japan
2016	Russia	Mongolia	Ukraine	Japan
2018	Japan	Russia	Poland	Ukraine
2019	Russia	Japan	Egypt	Ukraine
2023	Japan	Ukraine	Mongolia	Georgia
2024	Japan	Ukraine	Mongolia	Georgia
2025	Japan	Georgia	Ukraine	Mongolia
2026	Japan	Ukraine	Kyrgyzstan	Mongolia

== See also ==
- Sumo World Championships
- List of World Sumo Championships medalists (women)
- List of World Sumo Championships medalists (junior men)
- List of World Sumo Championships medalists (junior women)
