= List of World Sumo Championships medalists (junior men) =

Wikimedia list article

This is a list of world championships medalists in amateur sumo.

The International Sumo Federation (ISF) is the governing body of amateur sumo in the world. The first Junior Men's World Championship under the ISF was held in 1999.

== Junior men's individual ==
=== Lightweight ===
Meet	Gold	Silver	Bronze
1999 Riesa	(Japan) Chohei Kimura	(New Zealand) Tupu Saena	(Estonia) Vladimir Kljain
1999 Riesa	(Japan) Chohei Kimura	(New Zealand) Tupu Saena	(Japan) Takeshi Fukunaga
2000 São Paulo	(Japan) Hiroshi Nakasone	(Estonia) Vladimir Kljain	(Mongolia) Lodoijamts Bat-Erdene
2000 São Paulo	(Japan) Hiroshi Nakasone	(Estonia) Vladimir Kljain	(Czech Republic) Pavel Bojar
2001 Aomori	(Japan) Yuya Hanada	(Tonga) Siaosi Latanoa Falevai	(Estonia) Gert Krabbi
2001 Aomori	(Japan) Yuya Hanada	(Tonga) Siaosi Latanoa Falevai	(Czech Republic) Jakub Sara
2002 Wroclaw	(Japan) Kengo Nagai	(Tonga) Siaosi Latanoa Falevai	(Germany) Paul Sarezki
2002 Wroclaw	(Japan) Kengo Nagai	(Tonga) Siaosi Latanoa Falevai	(Brazil) Thomas Shinji Mori
2004 Riesa	(Bulgaria) Valentin Gogov	(Japan) Fuminori Sato	(Mongolia) Jantsan Bat-Erdene
2004 Riesa	(Bulgaria) Valentin Gogov	(Japan) Fuminori Sato	(Tonga) Sonatane Falevai
2005 Osaka	(Japan) Takashi Shimako	(Mongolia) Baljinnyam Myagmarsuren	(Moldova) Igor Ciurilov
2005 Osaka	(Japan) Takashi Shimako	(Mongolia) Baljinnyam Myagmarsuren	(Czech Republic) Michal Slanar
2006 Osaka	(Russia) Nachyn Mongush	(Japan) Masakatsu Ishiura	(Moldova) Igor Ciurilov
2006 Osaka	(Russia) Nachyn Mongush	(Japan) Masakatsu Ishiura	(Mongolia) Banzragch Baatar
2007 Chiang Mai	(Japan) Masakatsu Ishiura	(Mongolia) Zanabazar Bayarsaikhan	(Russia) Arturs Muradyan
2007 Chiang Mai	(Japan) Masakatsu Ishiura	(Mongolia) Zanabazar Bayarsaikhan	(Ukraine) Zakhar Kucheryavyi
2008 Rakvere	(Poland) Aron Rozum	(Japan) Yoshihiko Sekikawa	(Ukraine) Iaroslav Vasylenko
2008 Rakvere	(Poland) Aron Rozum	(Japan) Yoshihiko Sekikawa	(Russia) Andrey Mongush
2010 Warsaw	(Azerbaijan) Namig Sadigov	(Japan) Kazuki Waukei	(Russia) Vladimir Chayka
2010 Warsaw	(Azerbaijan) Namig Sadigov	(Japan) Kazuki Waukei	(Ukraine) Oleksandr Nesmekh
2012 Hong Kong	(Japan) Yūya Nakamura	(Mongolia) Ankhbayar Tserensambuu	(Hungary) Martin Prim
2012 Hong Kong	(Japan) Yūya Nakamura	(Mongolia) Ankhbayar Tserensambuu	(Russia) Maxim Luganskyi
2014 Taoyuan	(Japan) Haruki Uematsu	(Russia) Baasan Batkar	(Azerbaijan) Zaur Karimov
2014 Taoyuan	(Japan) Haruki Uematsu	(Russia) Baasan Batkar	(Poland) Rafal Glodek
2015 Osaka	(Russia) Baasan Batkar	(Poland) Jakub Daromochwal	(Ukraine) Vazha Daiauri
2015 Osaka	(Russia) Baasan Batkar	(Poland) Jakub Daromochwal	(Japan) Ryota Fukano
2016 Ulaanbaatar	(Egypt) Abdelrahman Elsefy	(Japan) Yuki Ishida	(Mongolia) Balijinnyam Khurelbaatar
2016 Ulaanbaatar	(Egypt) Abdelrahman Elsefy	(Japan) Yuki Ishida	(Poland) Karol Stasiewicz
2018 Taoyuan	(Hungary) Richard Vegh	(Ukraine) Maksym Tsybulniak	(Poland) Adrian Filip Gondek
2018 Taoyuan	(Hungary) Richard Vegh	(Ukraine) Maksym Tsybulniak	(Japan) Taiki Mita
2019 Osaka	(Japan) Taisei Kitano	(Russia) Megor Vlasov	(Ukraine) Mykola Solodovnikov
2019 Osaka	(Japan) Taisei Kitano	(Russia) Megor Vlasov	(Hungary) Erik Márk Szilágyi
2023 Tokyo	(Ukraine) Nikita Kanevskyi	(Estonia) Stefan Lauri	(Japan) Yoshitsune Okura
2023 Tokyo	(Ukraine) Nikita Kanevskyi	(Estonia) Stefan Lauri	(Poland) Pawel Polberk
2024 Krotoszyn	(Japan) Norifumi Tajima	(Hungary) Kristóf Jámbor	(Azerbaijan) Javidan Nahmatov
2024 Krotoszyn	(Japan) Norifumi Tajima	(Hungary) Kristóf Jámbor	(Ukraine) Yevhen Makarov
2025 Bangkok	(Japan) Yuto Nishio	(Poland) Antoni Czebatura	(Georgia (country)) Avto Liklikadze
2025 Bangkok	(Japan) Yuto Nishio	(Poland) Antoni Czebatura	(Ukraine) Nikita Savchenko
2026 Baku	(Poland) Antoni Czebatura	(Mongolia) Elbegsaikhan Ganbold	(Georgia (country)) Luka Makharadze
2026 Baku	(Poland) Antoni Czebatura	(Mongolia) Elbegsaikhan Ganbold	(Japan) Reiya Yamanobe

=== Middleweight ===
Meet	Gold	Silver	Bronze
1999 Riesa	(Japan) Yoshiaki Sugita	(Philippines) John Esteban	(Tonga) Kesomi 'Aukafolau
1999 Riesa	(Japan) Yoshiaki Sugita	(Philippines) John Esteban	(Brazil) Willian Takahiro Higuchi
2000 São Paulo	(Japan) Yosuke Terada	(Mongolia) Sukhbaatar Munkhsukh	(Tonga) Minaminoshima Falevai
2000 São Paulo	(Japan) Yosuke Terada	(Mongolia) Sukhbaatar Munkhsukh	(Brazil) Marcel Yukio Mori
2001 Aomori	(Japan) Katsuo Yoshida	(Brazil) Marcel Yukio Mori	(United States) Gregory Donofrio
2001 Aomori	(Japan) Katsuo Yoshida	(Brazil) Marcel Yukio Mori	(Kazakhstan) Andrey Svatkovskiy
2002 Wroclaw	(Japan) Ryuji Masuda	(Ukraine) Pavel Babich	(Brazil) Paulo Zen'ichi Kubagawa
2002 Wroclaw	(Japan) Ryuji Masuda	(Ukraine) Pavel Babich	(Mongolia) Tumurkhuyag Enkhtaivan
2004 Riesa	(Japan) Go Fukunaga	(Tonga) Siaosi Latanoa Falevai	(Mongolia) Zolbayar Batjargal
2004 Riesa	(Japan) Go Fukunaga	(Tonga) Siaosi Latanoa Falevai	(Georgia (country)) George Tsaguria
2005 Osaka	(Japan) Seiya Matsuda	(Bulgaria) Georgi Stoichkov	(Germany) Eric Hoft
2005 Osaka	(Japan) Seiya Matsuda	(Bulgaria) Georgi Stoichkov	(Tonga) Sonatane Falevai
2006 Osaka	(Japan) Takashi Shimako	(Estonia) Madis Sihimets	(Russia) Khayaa Tyulyush
2006 Osaka	(Japan) Takashi Shimako	(Estonia) Madis Sihimets	(Moldova) Artiom Pocinoc
2007 Chiang Mai	(Mongolia) Baasandorj Adiya	(Ukraine) Midat Kurbedinov	(Poland) Martin Alcer
2007 Chiang Mai	(Mongolia) Baasandorj Adiya	(Ukraine) Midat Kurbedinov	(Japan) Tōru Takagi
2008 Rakvere	(Poland) Martin Alcer	(Ukraine) Tymur Prymshoev	(Egypt) Mohamed Omar
2008 Rakvere	(Poland) Martin Alcer	(Ukraine) Tymur Prymshoev	(Russia) Chayan Dongak
2010 Warsaw	(Poland) Andrzej Mazurek	(Japan) Masaya Iwasaki	(Russia) Naydan Oorzhak
2010 Warsaw	(Poland) Andrzej Mazurek	(Japan) Masaya Iwasaki	(Azerbaijan) Amiraslan Ahmadov
2012 Hong Kong	(Mongolia) Syerik Byeryedmurat	(Japan) Atsushi Ōnami	(Ukraine) Mykola Kozhukhov
2012 Hong Kong	(Mongolia) Syerik Byeryedmurat	(Japan) Atsushi Ōnami	(Azerbaijan) Amiraslan Ahmadov
2014 Taoyuan	(Russia) Konstantin Abdulazade	(Japan) Koki Kobayashi	(Brazil) Matheus Gabriel Cruz dos Santos
2014 Taoyuan	(Russia) Konstantin Abdulazade	(Japan) Koki Kobayashi	(Poland) Sebastian Alcer
2015 Osaka	(Japan) Taku Akiba	(Egypt) Fathy Mohamed Mail Abou El Rokb	(Ukraine) Andrii Galeta
2015 Osaka	(Japan) Taku Akiba	(Egypt) Fathy Mohamed Mail Abou El Rokb	(Georgia (country)) Nikoloz Sisvadze
2016 Ulaanbaatar	(Mongolia) Mendsaikhan Tsogt-Erdene	(Egypt) Yousef Abdelwahab	(Russia) Kirill Cherepov
2016 Ulaanbaatar	(Mongolia) Mendsaikhan Tsogt-Erdene	(Egypt) Yousef Abdelwahab	(Japan) Takuma Ishizaki
2018 Taoyuan	(Russia) Kundesonam Ondar	(Japan) Daisei Yuki	(Georgia (country)) Daviti Katsadze
2018 Taoyuan	(Russia) Kundesonam Ondar	(Japan) Daisei Yuki	(Egypt) Mohamed El-Mahdy
2019 Osaka	(Japan) Taiki Mita	(Poland) Adam Mateusz Gardziola	(Brazil) Guilherme Vaz
2019 Osaka	(Japan) Taiki Mita	(Poland) Adam Mateusz Gardziola	(Ukraine) Danylo Yavhusishyn
2023 Tokyo	(Japan) Jyonoshin Mitsuhashi	(Brazil) Paulo Cesar Freitas de Oliveira Júnior	(Georgia (country)) Daviti Akubardia
2023 Tokyo	(Japan) Jyonoshin Mitsuhashi	(Brazil) Paulo Cesar Freitas de Oliveira Júnior	(Hungary) Marcell Gyuricza
2024 Krotoszyn	(Japan) Jyonoshin Mitsuhashi	(Brazil) Paulo Cesar Freitas de Oliveira Júnior	(Georgia (country)) Daviti Akubardia
2024 Krotoszyn	(Japan) Jyonoshin Mitsuhashi	(Brazil) Paulo Cesar Freitas de Oliveira Júnior	(Poland) Maciej Kuzdak
2025 Bangkok	(Japan) Ren Nagatsuyu	(Poland) Maciej Kuzdak	(Brazil) Kaio Ruiz dos Santos Soares
2025 Bangkok	(Japan) Ren Nagatsuyu	(Poland) Maciej Kuzdak	(Ukraine) Semen Makarov
2026 Baku	(Japan) Fuma Tamashiro	(Estonia) Joosep Kold	(Mongolia) Buyandelger Nasantogtokh
2026 Baku	(Japan) Fuma Tamashiro	(Estonia) Joosep Kold	(Ukraine) Semen Makarov

=== Heavyweight ===
Meet	Gold	Silver	Bronze
1999 Riesa	(Japan) Nobuhiro Shiraishi	(Japan) Tomoki Mori	(Tonga) Tekiela 'Aukafolau
1999 Riesa	(Japan) Nobuhiro Shiraishi	(Japan) Tomoki Mori	(Egypt) Ahmed El-Naggar
2000 São Paulo	(Japan) Akiyoshi Nagai	(Brazil) Roberto Seiji Fugo	(Mongolia) Dagdandorj Nyamsuren
2000 São Paulo	(Japan) Akiyoshi Nagai	(Brazil) Roberto Seiji Fugo	(Czech Republic) Jiri Prazan
2001 Aomori	(Japan) Keisho Shimoda	(Mongolia) Naranbat Gankhuyag	(Russia) Vladimir Antonov
2001 Aomori	(Japan) Keisho Shimoda	(Mongolia) Naranbat Gankhuyag	(Kazakhstan) Aidyn Ramazanov
2002 Wroclaw	(Japan) Ryūichi Yamamoto	(Brazil) Artur Takenori Sugimoto	(Russia) Alan Gabaraev
2002 Wroclaw	(Japan) Ryūichi Yamamoto	(Brazil) Artur Takenori Sugimoto	(Uzbekistan) Adiljan Tulendibaev
2004 Riesa	(Japan) Yūichirō Kageyama	(Brazil) Edson Ken'ichi Morimoto	(Georgia (country)) George Nikuradze
2004 Riesa	(Japan) Yūichirō Kageyama	(Brazil) Edson Ken'ichi Morimoto	(Germany) Christian Thomas
2005 Osaka	(Japan) Kou Okuya	(Georgia (country)) Levan Gorgadze	(Egypt) Samer Samir Abd El Karim
2005 Osaka	(Japan) Kou Okuya	(Georgia (country)) Levan Gorgadze	(Brazil) Luis Eduardo Lopes do Carmo
2006 Osaka	(Japan) Masahiro Yamaguchi	(New Zealand) Visesio Sakalia	(Lithuania) Rokas Adomaitis
2006 Osaka	(Japan) Masahiro Yamaguchi	(New Zealand) Visesio Sakalia	(Russia) Vladimir Petrov
2007 Chiang Mai	(Japan) Masahiro Yamaguchi	(Georgia (country)) Adam Okruashvili	(Bulgaria) Ivan Kachakov
2007 Chiang Mai	(Japan) Masahiro Yamaguchi	(Georgia (country)) Adam Okruashvili	(Ukraine) Oleksiy Pischulin
2008 Rakvere	(Japan) Gakuto Nagumo	(Mongolia) Baasandorj Adiya	(Ukraine) Roman Muravlov
2008 Rakvere	(Japan) Gakuto Nagumo	(Mongolia) Baasandorj Adiya	(Brazil) Gabriel Fernandes Vieira
2010 Warsaw	(Japan) Shinji Kizaki	(Mongolia) Azzaya Davaasuren	(Bulgaria) Martin Borisov
2010 Warsaw	(Japan) Shinji Kizaki	(Mongolia) Azzaya Davaasuren	(Egypt) Abdelrahman Shalan
2012 Hong Kong	(Mongolia) Azzaya Davaasuren	(Georgia (country)) Giga Gelashvili	(Ukraine) Sergiy Zvieriev
2012 Hong Kong	(Mongolia) Azzaya Davaasuren	(Georgia (country)) Giga Gelashvili	(Japan) Takahiro Furukawa
2014 Taoyuan	(Japan) Ryosuke Nakajima	(Georgia (country)) Giorgi Paradashvili	(Ukraine) Serhii Sokolovskyi
2014 Taoyuan	(Japan) Ryosuke Nakajima	(Georgia (country)) Giorgi Paradashvili	(Egypt) Ibrahim Mohamed Abdellatif
2015 Osaka	(Japan) Masakatsu Kamatani	(Georgia (country)) Shamili Gogotchuri	(Mongolia) Amarsanaa Amartuvshin
2015 Osaka	(Japan) Masakatsu Kamatani	(Georgia (country)) Shamili Gogotchuri	(Ukraine) Serhii Sokolovskyi
2016 Ulaanbaatar	(Japan) Atsushi Sato	(Mongolia) Davaajamts Nanjidsuren	(Egypt) Moaz Mostafa Ibrahim
2016 Ulaanbaatar	(Japan) Atsushi Sato	(Mongolia) Davaajamts Nanjidsuren	not awarded
2018 Taoyuan	(Japan) Daisuke Saitō	(Brazil) João Arruda	(Poland) Damian Wrobel
2018 Taoyuan	(Japan) Daisuke Saitō	(Brazil) João Arruda	(Georgia (country)) Zura Tsikoradze
2019 Osaka	(Japan) Kazuma Kawabuchi	(Brazil) João Arruda	(Poland) Hubert Dominik Niemczyk
2019 Osaka	(Japan) Kazuma Kawabuchi	(Brazil) João Arruda	(Mongolia) Ochirsaikhan Battsetseg
2023 Tokyo	(Japan) Daiki Nishide	(Mongolia) Delgerbat Altangerel	(Brazil) Mateus Lopes Amaral
2023 Tokyo	(Japan) Daiki Nishide	(Mongolia) Delgerbat Altangerel	(Thailand) Weerapat Nishizaki
2024 Krotoszyn	(Japan) Haruto Asada	(Poland) Olaf Platek	(Georgia (country)) Davit Abalaki
2024 Krotoszyn	(Japan) Haruto Asada	(Poland) Olaf Platek	(Estonia) Anatoli Zadorožnõi
2025 Bangkok	(Japan) Renta Ogawa	(Mongolia) Batbold Bat-Erdene	(Poland) Olaf Platek
2025 Bangkok	(Japan) Renta Ogawa	(Mongolia) Batbold Bat-Erdene	(Estonia) Anatoli Zadorožnõi
2026 Baku	(Japan) Keigo Nagamatsu	(Mongolia) Sanchirgarid Chuluunbaatar	(Ukraine) Davyd Bryndzia
2026 Baku	(Japan) Keigo Nagamatsu	(Mongolia) Sanchirgarid Chuluunbaatar	(Estonia) Marten Annuk

=== Openweight ===
Meet	Gold	Silver	Bronze
1999 Riesa	(United States) Harrington Wa'a	(Japan) Takayuki Ichihara	(Japan) Hiroyuki Isobe
1999 Riesa	(United States) Harrington Wa'a	(Japan) Takayuki Ichihara	(Estonia) Fjodor Ursaki
2000 São Paulo	(Japan) Masaru Maeta	(Tonga) Kesomi 'Aukafolau	(Germany) Jonas Rabbatah
2000 São Paulo	(Japan) Masaru Maeta	(Tonga) Kesomi 'Aukafolau	(Russia) Vladimir Antonov
2001 Aomori	(Japan) Kazuhiro Kikutsugi	(Germany) Jonas Rabbatah	(Uzbekistan) Mansur Mirzaev
2001 Aomori	(Japan) Kazuhiro Kikutsugi	(Germany) Jonas Rabbatah	(Russia) Alexander Boulanov
2002 Wroclaw	(Japan) Takayuki Ichihara	(Hungary) Péter Horváth	(Czech Republic) Jan Knectl
2002 Wroclaw	(Japan) Takayuki Ichihara	(Hungary) Péter Horváth	(Russia) Oleg Dzarasuev
2004 Riesa	(Japan) Gōtarō Sawai	(Hungary) Attila Toth	(Georgia (country)) Levan Gorgadze
2004 Riesa	(Japan) Gōtarō Sawai	(Hungary) Attila Toth	(Brazil) Ricardo Sugano
2005 Osaka	(Japan) Masaru Tateno	(Brazil) Renê da Silva Crespo Júnior	(Egypt) Abd El Karim Mohamed Ibrahim
2005 Osaka	(Japan) Masaru Tateno	(Brazil) Renê da Silva Crespo Júnior	(Georgia (country)) Teimuraz Jugheli
2006 Osaka	(Japan) Takayuki Sakuma	(Russia) Soslan Kobesov	(New Zealand) Mark Tanu
2006 Osaka	(Japan) Takayuki Sakuma	(Russia) Soslan Kobesov	(Mongolia) Sandagdorj Bold
2007 Chiang Mai	(Japan) Seiya Hashimoto	(Georgia (country)) Zaza Balashvili	(Ukraine) Oleksandr Veresiuk
2007 Chiang Mai	(Japan) Seiya Hashimoto	(Georgia (country)) Zaza Balashvili	(Russia) Chayan Dongak
2008 Rakvere	(Georgia (country)) Zaza Balashvili	(Japan) Keisuke Yoshida	(Poland) Bartlomiej Struss
2008 Rakvere	(Georgia (country)) Zaza Balashvili	(Japan) Keisuke Yoshida	(Egypt) Abd El Rahman Alaa El Din
2010 Warsaw	(Japan) Daiki Nakamura	(Mongolia) Temuulen Batjargal	(Bulgaria) Pavlin Dimitrov
2010 Warsaw	(Japan) Daiki Nakamura	(Mongolia) Temuulen Batjargal	(Poland) Bartlomiej Struss
2012 Hong Kong	(Japan) Yusuke Muramatsu	(Mongolia) Turbold Baasansuren	(Russia) Valentin Starkov
2012 Hong Kong	(Japan) Yusuke Muramatsu	(Mongolia) Turbold Baasansuren	(Brazil) Rui Aparecido de Sá Júnior
2014 Taoyuan	(Japan) Takanobu Satō	(Mongolia) Amartuvshin Erdenebileg	(Georgia (country)) Lasha Jeladze
2014 Taoyuan	(Japan) Takanobu Satō	(Mongolia) Amartuvshin Erdenebileg	(Estonia) Toomas Braun
2015 Osaka	(Japan) Seira Shiroyama	(Egypt) Abdelrahman Ebeid	(Mongolia) Mandakh Baldandavaa
2015 Osaka	(Japan) Seira Shiroyama	(Egypt) Abdelrahman Ebeid	(Estonia) Toomas Braun
2016 Ulaanbaatar	(Georgia (country)) Amirani Tsikoridze	(Japan) Yōta Kanno	(Egypt) Islam Dewidar
2016 Ulaanbaatar	(Georgia (country)) Amirani Tsikoridze	(Japan) Yōta Kanno	(Russia) Maksim Burlak
2018 Taoyuan	(Japan) Hidetora Hanada	(Mongolia) Temuulen Tumurbaatar	(Russia) Ignatiy Abdulazade
2018 Taoyuan	(Japan) Hidetora Hanada	(Mongolia) Temuulen Tumurbaatar	(Chinese Taipei) You-Ming Dai
2019 Osaka	(Japan) Hidetora Hanada	(Poland) Kacper Mikolajczyk	(Brazil) Pedro Arruda
2019 Osaka	(Japan) Hidetora Hanada	(Poland) Kacper Mikolajczyk	(Mongolia) Munkh-Ider Batjargal
2023 Tokyo	(Japan) Tenga Noda	(Mongolia) Ragchaasuren Altansukh	(Estonia) Karlis Bollverk
2023 Tokyo	(Japan) Tenga Noda	(Mongolia) Ragchaasuren Altansukh	(Ukraine) Yevhen Makarov
2024 Krotoszyn	(Japan) Daiki Nishide	(Poland) Piotr Swora	(Ukraine) Semen Makarov
2024 Krotoszyn	(Japan) Daiki Nishide	(Poland) Piotr Swora	not awarded
2025 Bangkok	(Japan) Haruto Asada	(Georgia (country)) Davit Abalaki	(Mongolia) Ganbaatar Bat-Ulzii
2025 Bangkok	(Japan) Haruto Asada	(Georgia (country)) Davit Abalaki	(Ukraine) Ivan Kyryliuk
2026 Baku	(Japan) Konosuke Shigemura	(Ukraine) Ivan Kyryliuk	(Mongolia) Enkhdul Purevsuren
2026 Baku	(Japan) Konosuke Shigemura	(Ukraine) Ivan Kyryliuk	(Georgia (country)) Rati Tsulukidze

== Junior men's teams ==
Year	1st place	2nd place	3rd	3rd
1999	Japan	Estonia	Egypt	Finland
2000	Japan	Russia	Brazil	Mongolia
2001	Japan	Russia	Kazakhstan	Estonia
2002	Japan	Tonga	Moldova	Russia
2004	Japan	Georgia	Brazil	Tonga
2005	Japan	Georgia	Tonga	Brazil
2006	Japan	Poland	Ukraine	Russia
2007	Japan	Georgia	Ukraine	Mongolia
2008	Japan	Egypt	Brazil	Ukraine
2010	Japan	Ukraine	Hungary	Russia
2012	Japan	Russia	Ukraine	Mongolia
2014	Japan	Mongolia	Georgia	Egypt
2015	Japan	Brazil	Mongolia	Egypt
2016	Japan	Egypt	Mongolia	Poland
2018	Japan	Mongolia	Poland	Russia
2019	Japan	Mongolia	Georgia	Poland
2023	Japan	Poland	Thailand	Ukraine
2024	Japan	Brazil	Georgia	Poland
2025	Japan	Ukraine	Poland	Mongolia
2026	Japan	Mongolia	Chinese Taipei	Poland

== See also ==
- Sumo World Championships
- List of World Sumo Championships medalists (men)
- List of World Sumo Championships medalists (women)
- List of World Sumo Championships medalists (junior women)
