= Dewanoryū Kazuki =

Mongolian sumo wrestler

Personal information
- Native name: 出羽ノ龍 和希
- Born: March 7, 2001 (age 25) Ulaanbaatar, Mongolia
- Height: 1.81 m (5 ft 11 1/2 in)
- Weight: 154 kg (340 lb)

Sport
- Sport: Sumo
- Rank: see below
- Heya: Dewanoumi
- Debut: November 2019
- Highest rank: Maegashira 14 (November 2026)
- Championships: Jūryō (1); Jonidan (1)
- Updated on October 26, 2026

Medal record

Men's Sumo

Representing Mongolia

Junior World Sumo Championships
Silver medal – second place	2018, Taoyuan, Taiwan	Openweight

Dewanoryū Kazuki (Japanese: 出羽ノ龍 和希; born March 7, 2001, as Temuulen Tumurbaatar (Note: Mongolian: Төмөрбаатарын Тэмүүлэн)) is a Mongolian professional sumo wrestler from Ulaanbaatar, Mongolia. Wrestling for Dewanoumi stable, his highest rank is maegashira 14.

== Early life ==
Tumurbaatar was inspired at a relatively early age by Mongolian wrestlers such as Asashōryū, Harumafuji, and Hakuhō. He began practicing sumo in elementary school. He continued to practice through middle school and competed in several international tournaments, including the Asashōryū Cup and the inaugural Hakuhō Cup, winning the team competitions at both events. Starting in middle school, he tried his hand at other sports, including basketball, but decided to focus on sumo when he enrolled at Kibōgaoka High School in Nakama, Fukuoka (Japan), a city he considers his second home. There, he was a classmate of future international table tennis player Hina Hayata, among others. During his high school years, he competed in several national tournaments, finishing among the top 16 wrestlers at the National High School Sumo Championship. In his junior year, he finished among the top eight national teams at the national championships in Kanazawa and Towada. That same year, he placed second in the heavyweight individual division at the Junior World Sumo Championships, losing to Hidetora Hanada on the finals. During his amateur career, however, he was unable to win any individual or team titles.

After graduating, he was immediately introduced to Takasaki (former maegashira Kinkaiyama), a coach at Dewanoumi stable. After a period of preliminary training and obtaining a work visa, Tumurbaatar officially joined the stable for the November 2019 tournament.

== Career ==
Tumurbaatar was given the shikona Dewanoryū Kazuki (出羽ノ龍 和希), a ring name combining the "Dewa" part (出羽) from his stable (出羽海) and the character for dragon (龍), expressing hopes that he would rise through the ranks. His first name includes the character for "peace" (和), which is also found in the name of his stablemaster, Dewanoumi (former maegashira Oginohana), and the character for "begging" (希), which is found in the name of his former coach at Kibōgaoka High School.

Dewanoryū began his career by falling one loss short of winning the jonokuchi division championship. At the March 2020 tournament, he won the jonidan division championship. He continued to climb the ranks until he was promoted to the makushita division for the March 2021 tournament. During that tournament, he competed for the title before being defeated by Abi, a former makuuchi-ranked wrestler who was returning to active competition after a suspension. During the March 2022 tournament, Dewanoryū had a chance to earn promotion to the jūryō division, as he was ranked at the top of the makushita division. However, he was forced to withdraw from the entire tournament after suffering a neck injury during the January tournament, effectively falling in the rankings. Like all members of Dewanoumi stable, Dewanoryū also had to withdraw from the July 2022 tournament after another member of his stable tested positive for COVID-19. In November 2025, Dewanoryū once again found himself in a position to be promoted to jūryō, posting a 5–2 record and securing his promotion.

On November 26, it was confirmed at the promotion announcement meeting that Dewanoryū would indeed be promoted to the sekitori ranks. This promotion made him the second sekitori in his stable, a first since his stablemate Mitakeumi was promoted for the July 2015 tournament. This promotion also makes him the 41st Mongolian to become a sekitori in the history of the sport. After retaining his rank at the January 2026 tournament, Dewanoryū stood out at the March tournament by leading the competition, culminating in a playoff against Wakanoshō on the final day. Dewanoryū emerged victorious and won the championship by yorikiri. After two more tournaments in jūryō, Dewanoryū was finally promoted to the top of the division, a position that potentially opened the door to a promotion to the sport's highest division. Following a strong tournament, it was confirmed when the banzuke for the November 2026 tournament was unveiled that Dewanoryū would be promoted to makuuchi.

== Fighting style ==
Dewanoryū's most common kimarite, or winning technique, is yorikiri ('frontal force out'), and he prefers a migi-yotsu, or left hand outside, right hand inside grip on his opponent's mawashi.

Originally a belt-level wrestler, Dewanoryū has also been recognized since turning professional as a specialist in oshi/tsuki (push-and-strike style). He attributes the influence to his stablemate Mitakeumi, who practices the same style.

== Career record ==
Dewanoryū Kazuki
Year	January Hatsu basho, Tokyo	March Haru basho, Osaka	May Natsu basho, Tokyo	July Nagoya basho, Nagoya	September Aki basho, Tokyo	November Kyūshū basho, Fukuoka
2019	x	x	x	x	x	(Maezumō)
2020	West Jonokuchi #25; 6–1	East Jonidan #49; 7–0; Champion	East Sandanme #49; Tournament Cancelled; State of Emergency; 0–0–0	East Sandanme #49; 5–2	East Sandanme #26; 4–3	East Sandanme #10; 4–3
2021	West Makushita #59; 3–4	West Sandanme #14; 5–2	East Makushita #49; 6–1	West Makushita #21; 5–2	West Makushita #11; 3–4	East Makushita #19; 6–1
2022	East Makushita #6; 4–3	West Makushita #3; Sat out due to injury 0–0–7	West Makushita #43; 6–1	West Makushita #17; 1–3–3 (Note: Withdrew on Day 7 due to COVID protocols)	West Makushita #17; 5–2	East Makushita #9; 4–3
2023	East Makushita #6; 3–4	East Makushita #11; 5–2	East Makushita #7; 2–5	West Makushita #15; 3–4	West Makushita #20; 5–2	West Makushita #10; 3–4
2024	East Makushita #18; 5–2	East Makushita #9; 2–5	West Makushita #18; 5–2	East Makushita #9; 5–2	East Makushita #3; 2–5	East Makushita #13; 3–4
2025	East Makushita #22; 5–2	East Makushita #10; 6–1	West Makushita #2; 3–4	East Makushita #15; 2–5	East Makushita #10; 6–1	West Makushita #3; 5–2
2026	West Jūryō #13; 8–7	East Jūryō #10; 11–4–P; Champion	East Jūryō #3; 7–8	West Jūryō #3; 9–6	East Jūryō #1; 10–5	West Maegashira #14; 8–7
Record given as wins–losses–absences Top division champion Top division runner-up Retired Non-participation Jūryō Lower divisions Sanshō key: F=Fighting spirit; O=Outstanding performance; T=Technique Also shown: ★=Kinboshi; P=Playoff(s); Divisions: Makuuchi — Jūryō — Makushita — Sandanme — Jonidan — Jonokuchi Makuuchi ranks: Yokozuna — Ōzeki — Sekiwake — Komusubi — Maegashira

== See also ==
- Glossary of sumo terms
- List of active sumo wrestlers
- List of Mongolian sumo wrestlers
- List of non-Japanese sumo wrestlers
