= Igor Kurinnoy =

Russian wrestler

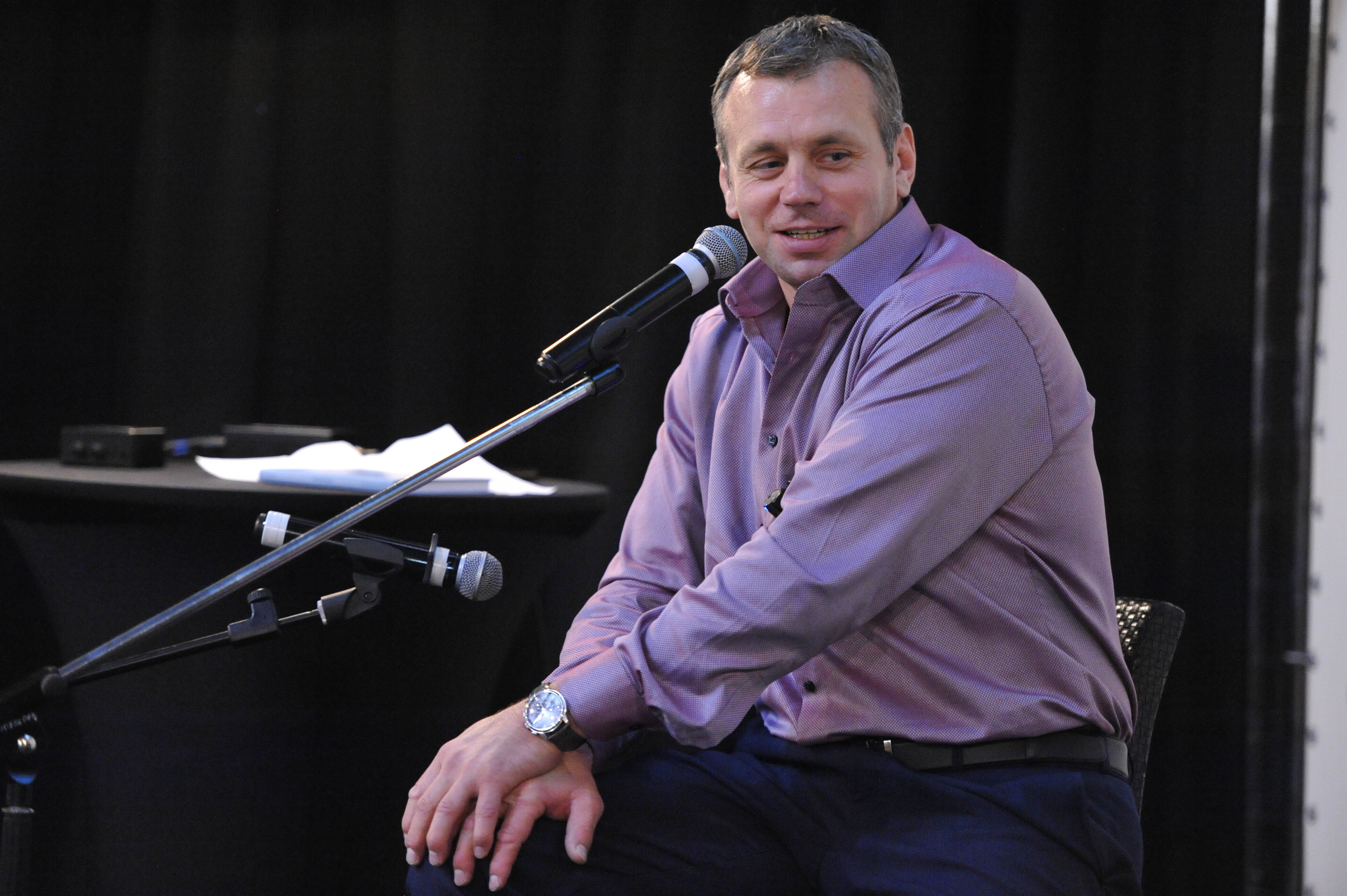

Personal information
- Native name: Игорь Игоревич Куринной
- Nationality: Russia
- Born: 22 March 1972 (age 54) Belokorowitschi, Ukrainian Soviet Socialist Republic
- Height: 180 cm (5 ft 11 in)
- Weight: 90 kg (198 lb)

Sport
- Country: Russia
- Sport: Wrestling
- Events: Sambo, Sumo
- Club: Sambo-70
Medal record
Sambo
Representing Russia
World Championships
| Gold medal – first place | 1991 Montreal | 82 kg |
| Gold medal – first place | 1994 Novi Sad | 82 kg |
| Gold medal – first place | 2001 Krasnoyarsk | 90 kg |
Sumo
Representing Russia
World Games
| Silver medal – second place | 2005 Duisburg | 85 kg |
Sumo World Championships
| Bronze medal – third place | 2002 Poland |
| Bronze medal – third place | 2004 Germany |
| Bronze medal – third place | 2006 Japan |

Igor Igorevich Kurinnoy (born March 22, 1972) is a Soviet and Russian sambo and sumotori wrestler and a three-time sambo world champion, a silver medalist of the World Games, a five-time sambo European champion, a three-time bronze medalist of the world championships in sumo, a three-time European sumo champion, a five-time winner of the Sambo World Cup, an honored master of sports in sambo and sumo, a master of sports in judo. He is a public figure, an author of a number of study guides in the field of history, theory and practice of physical education and sports training.

== Biography ==
He was born on March 22, 1972, in the village of Belokorovichi, the Zhitomir region. In 1975 he moved with his parents to the city of Smolensk where in 1983 he began to engage in sambo and judo wrestling in the Voluntary Sports Society (VSS) Urozhay with the coach Ivan Stefanovich Andrusov.

In 1984 he moved to Moscow where he continued training in the judo section of CSKA. On September 1, 1985, he entered the special class of the school of Olympic reserve “Sambo-70” where he trained under the guidance of the coach Oleg Vitalievich Komarov.

In 1987 he became the winner of the Schoolchildren's Spartakiad of the USSR.

In 1988 he became the silver medalist of the All-Union Youth Games and fulfilled the requirements for “Master of Sports of the USSR”. In 1989 he became the winner of the USSR Championship among young men. Around the same year he finished school and entered the Dzerzhinsky Military Engineering Academy of the Strategic Missile Forces, specializing in aircraft automatic control systems.

In 1990 he won the silver medal at the World Youth Championship. In the 1991 World Sambo Championships at Montreal he won his first gold medal in his career, becoming the youngest world champion in sambo (at the age of 19 and 9 months). He fulfilled the requirements for “Master of Sports of the USSR of the international class”. Kurinnoy was in the last national team of the USSR. In the 1994 World Sambo Championships at Novi Sad he won the second gold medal. In the same year he won the Team World Cup as part of the Russian national team, as well as his personal Sambo World Cup. After that, he was awarded the title of Honored Master of Sports in Sambo. He was officially called the “Best Athlete of Moscow 1994”. In 1995 he graduated from the academy and continued his service in The Military Space Forces of Russia. In 2001 he won the third gold medal of the World Cup. He was the winner of the World Cup in 1994, 1996, 2001 and 2002.

Kurinnoy stood at the origins of the sumo wrestling in Russia. In 1998 he became the first Russian sumo champion. He was the founder of the wrestling school “Borets” (The wrestler) Kurinnoy is a three-time bronze medalist of the world sumo championship, a three-time European sumo champion. In 2003 and 2004 he was recognized as the best sumotori wrestler of Europe. In 2004 he received the title of Honored Master of Sports in Sumo.

By the decree of the President of the Russian Federation V.V. Putin in 2003 he was awarded the Medal of the Order "For Merit to the Fatherland" (II Class). He has a letter of gratitude from the President of the Russian Federation (2012). Kurinnoy is a laureate of the Moscow Mayor's Prize as the best trainer of the year and the author of innovative study guides (2008, 2013), a laureate of the All-Russian competition for young scientists in the field of high achievement sports (2006). For the work on popularizing the ideas of astronautics among young people he was awarded the medal named after Yu.A. Gagarin of the Russian Aviation and Space Agency and the medal “For the Great Contribution to the Development of Astronautics” of the Council of Veterans of the Military Space Forces. In 2006 he was awarded the medal “For Serving the Homeland”. In 2013 he was awarded the honorary title “A Honorary Citizen of the Novo-Peredelkino District in the City of Moscow”. He is the winner of the “Sports Glory of Moscow” (2017).

In 2002 he defended his thesis on the topic: “The use of modern information technologies for increasing the effectiveness of the wrestler’s training process” and received a PhD in pedagogy. From 2008 to 2013 he was a professor, the head of the Department of Physical Education at the Pirogov Russian National Research Medical University. His study guide “Physical Education of Students at a Medical University” was recognized as the best textbook of the Pirogov Russian National Research Medical University in 2011. On December 5, 2009, he was elected professor of the Academy of Military Science of the Russian Federation. In 2013 he was elected to the first public chamber of the city of Moscow in history.

Kurinnoy is a member of the Union of Writers of Russia (since 2017), a laureate of the E. Zubov Prize in Literature (2019). He was awarded the Sergey Orekhov Medal of Moscow Philharmonic for his contribution to the popularization of guitar art. He is a member of the Board of the All-Russian Friendship Society with Cuba (since 2018). He is a full member of the International Academy of Russian Literature (2019).

He is currently the director of the sports school “Borets” (The wrestler), president of the Sumo Federation of Moscow.

He is also known as a performer in the genre of author's song, having his own wide repertoire and leading touring activities. He wrote more than 150 songs.

== Music albums ==
- “The wrestler with a guitar” (2015)
- “Spring, friends, a guitar” (2016)
- “This world seemed fabulously beautiful” (2017)
- “Be careful with the words, gentlemen!” (2018)
- “Good Words” (2019)
- “The wind is chasing a leaf” (2019)
- "Oblaka" (Clouds) 2020
- Symphonic fantasies for guitar and orchestra (2021)

== Bibliography ==
- Kurinnoy I.I. Igry, ugodnyebogam (Games pleasing to the gods), Publisher: AST, Astrel, VKT ISBN 978-5-17-068349-9, 978-5-271-29002-2, 978-5-226-02694-2; 2010 (In Russian)
- Kurinnoy I.I. Borec o bor’be. Filosofija i praktika bor’by velikoj imperii (The wrestler about the fight.The philosophy and practice of the struggle of the great empire). Publisher: AST. ISBN 978-5-17-060770-9; 2009 (In Russian)
- Kurinnoy I.I. Sambo for professionals. Throws techniques. 1995-2009 (In English)
- Kurinnoy I.I. Sambo for professionals. Ground work. 1995-2009 (In English)
- Kurinnoy I.I. Sambo for professionals. Physical preparation. 1995-2009 (In English)
- Z-80 Zolotaja stroke Moskovii. Antologija odnogo stihotvorenija (The golden lineof Muscovy.An anthology of a poem). – Moscow: Serebro slov Publ., – 2017.– 26 p. (In Russian)
- P67 Pojezija. Dvadcat' pervyj vek ot Rozhdestva Hristova (Poetry. The twenty-first centuryafter the birth of Christ.No. 2, 2017. – Moscow.: The international public organization of writers “International Literary Fund”; Kolomna: Serebroslov Publ., 2017. – 272 p.: illust. (In Russian)
- K14 Kazachij krest (Cossack's Cross) – Moscow: Kolomna: Serebroslov Publ., 2017. – 454 p., illust. (In Russian)
- P67 Pojezija. Dvadcat' pervyj vek ot Rozhdestva Hristova (Poetry. The twenty-first centuryafter the birth of Christ.No. 2, 2018. – Moscow.: The international public organization of writers “International Literary Fund”; Kolomna: Serebroslov Publ., 2018.–272 p.: illust. (In Russian)
- Z-80 Zolotoe pero Moskovii (The golden feather of Muscovy.An anthology of a poem). – Moscow: Serebroslov Publ., – 2018. – 122p. (In Russian)
- To 93 Kurinnoy I. Gonit veter listok.Sbornikpojezii (The wind is chasing a leaf]. A collection of poetry). – Moscow: The Moscow City Organization of the Union of the Writers of Russia Publ., 2019. –206 p. ISBN 978-5-7949-0695-0 (In Russian)
- Z-80 Zolotoe pero Moskovii (The golden feather of Muscovy.An anthology of a poem).– Issue 24. –Moscow: Serebroslov Publ., – 2019. – 136p. (In Russian)
