= Sumo at the 2001 World Games – Men's middleweight =

Sumo men's middleweight at the 2001 World Games
- Venue: Tenno Town Gymnasium, Tenno, Akita, Japan
- Dates: 25 August 2001
- Competitors: 13 from 13 nations

Medalists
gold medal	(Japan) Seietsu Hikage
silver medal	(Mongolia) Altangadasyn Khüchitbaatar
bronze medal	(Russia) David Tsallagov

The men's middleweight competition in sumo at the 2001 World Games took place on 25 August 2001 at the Tenno Town Gymnasium in Tenno, Akita, Japan.

== Competition format ==
A total of 13 athletes entered the competition. They fought in stepladder system.

== Results ==
=== Gold medal bracket ===
Round 1
(Mongolia) Altangadasyn Khüchitbaatar (MGL)	W
(Paraguay) Roberto Ishikawa (PAR)	L
(Kazakhstan) Andrey Svatkovskiy (KAZ)	W
(Chinese Taipei) Chen Chien-han (TPE)	L
(Estonia) Aap Uspenski (EST)	L
(Uzbekistan) Shermakhamad Quziyev (UZB)	W
(United States) Kena Heffernan (USA)	W
(Tonga) Semise Pasi (TGA)	L
(Thailand) Hassabodin Rojanachiva (THA)	L
(Czech Republic) Pavel Poříz (CZE)	W

Quarterfinals
(Brazil) Paulo Kubagawa (BRA)	L
(Mongolia) Altangadasyn Khüchitbaatar (MGL)	W
(Russia) David Tsallagov (RUS)	W
(Kazakhstan) Andrey Svatkovskiy (KAZ)	L
(Japan) Seietsu Hikage (JPN)	W
(Uzbekistan) Shermakhamad Quziyev (UZB)	L
(United States) Kena Heffernan (USA)	W
(Czech Republic) Pavel Poříz (CZE)	L

Semifinals
(Mongolia) Altangadasyn Khüchitbaatar (MGL)	W
(Russia) David Tsallagov (RUS)	L
(Japan) Seietsu Hikage (JPN)	W
(United States) Kena Heffernan (USA)	L

Final
(Mongolia) Altangadasyn Khüchitbaatar (MGL)	L
(Japan) Seietsu Hikage (JPN)	W

=== Bronze medal bracket ===
Round 1
(Paraguay) Roberto Ishikawa (PAR)	L
(Brazil) Paulo Kubagawa (BRA)	W
(Tonga) Semise Pasi (TGA)	L
(Czech Republic) Pavel Poříz (CZE)	W

Round 2
(Brazil) Paulo Kubagawa (BRA)	W
(Kazakhstan) Andrey Svatkovskiy (KAZ)	L
(United States) Kena Heffernan (USA)
Bye
(Russia) David Tsallagov (RUS)
Bye
(Uzbekistan) Shermakhamad Quziyev (UZB)	W
(Czech Republic) Pavel Poříz (CZE)	L

Semifinals
(Brazil) Paulo Kubagawa (BRA)	W
(United States) Kena Heffernan (USA)	L
(Russia) David Tsallagov (RUS)	W
(Uzbekistan) Shermakhamad Quziyev (UZB)	L

Bronze medal match
(Brazil) Paulo Kubagawa (BRA)	L
(Russia) David Tsallagov (RUS)	W
