= 1991 World Sambo Championships =

Sambo competitions

The 1991 World Sambo Championships were held in two places because of international politics. In 1991, some countries left the long standing FIAS World Sambo Championships to create their own World Championship FMS / IFS (Federation Mondiale de Sambo / International Sambo Federation). The 1991 Soviet Union sambo team would be the last Soviet athletic team to compete as one country before the Soviet break up. The 1991 Soviet team became the last to ever win the World Sambo Championships as a country. The FIAS World Sambo Championships were held in Montreal, Quebec, Canada, and the new FMS World Sambo Championships were held in Chambéry, France in December. Following the 1991 World Championships, FIAS continued its control of International Sambo and remains the governing body for the World Sambo Championships.

== Medal overview (FMS) ==
men	Gold	Silver	Bronze
-48 kg	(Belarus) Nikolay Tsypandin (BLR)	(Moldova) Victor Grate (MDA)	(Armenia) Artur Ogonyan (ARM) (France) Jean-Luc Mazeau (FRA)
-52 kg	(Armenia) Gurgen Tutkhalyan (ARM)	(Georgia (country)) Mevlud Meladze (GEO)	(Spain) Lorenzo Gómez (ESP) (France) Jean-Louis Plisson (FRA)
-57 kg	(Armenia) Hovik Manukyan (ARM)	(Moldova) Vasile Dudush (MDA)	(France) Kristian Deneville (FRA) (Italy) Angelo Arlandi (ITA)
-62 kg	(Belarus) Natik Bagirov (BLR)	(Moldova) Fedor Lazarenko (MDA)	(Georgia (country)) Murtaz Turkia (GEO) (Armenia) Vardan Vaskanyan (ARM)
-68 kg	(Armenia) Garik Kazaryan (ARM)	(Georgia (country)) Gia Natsvlishvili (GEO)	(France) Dominic Jean (FRA) (Belarus) Igor Kolev (BLR)
-74 kg	(Belarus) Vladimir Cernykh (BLR)	(France) Didier Berkati (FRA)	(Armenia) Ara Chatyan (ARM) (Spain) José Fernández (ESP)
-82 kg	(France) Didier Duru (FRA)	(Belarus) Viktor Bukhval (BLR)	(Russia) Nikolay Kozlovsky (RUS) (Turkey) Laskar Dridi (TUR)
-90 kg	(Armenia) Artur Grigoryan (ARM)	(Belarus) Dmitry Bozhko (BLR)	(Georgia (country)) Ivane Kvavilashvili (GEO) (Japan) Tadatomi Ida (JPN)
-100 kg	(Belarus) Yevgeny Dolinin (BLR)	(Japan) Shioda Takahi (JPN)	(Georgia (country)) Viktor Avaliani (GEO) (France) Kristian Bruzat (FRA)
+100 kg	(Georgia (country)) Valeri Parunashvili (GEO)	(France) Kristian Bruza (FRA)	(Japan) Inayaki Mazasoshi (JPN) (Romania) Sovik Sogosariv (ROU)

== Medal overview (FIAS) ==
men	Gold	Silver	Bronze
-48 kg	(United States) Narin Viravong (USA)		
-52 kg	(Bulgaria) Ivaylo Todorov (BUL)	(United States) Brady Taylor (USA)	
-57 kg	(Canada) R. Dawson (CAN)	(Bulgaria) E. Ignatov (BUL)	
-62 kg	(Soviet Union) Sergey Golovin (URS)^{RUS}	(Bulgaria) Ivan Netov (BUL)	(Canada) M. Sullivan (CAN)
-68 kg	(Soviet Union) Aleksandr Aksenov (URS)^{RUS}	(Canada) I. Ordilek (CAN)	(United States) Sandy North (USA)
-74 kg	(Soviet Union) Vladimir Yaprintsev (URS)^{BLR}	(United States) Steve Nelson (USA)	(Bulgaria) Vasil Sokolov (BUL)
-82 kg	(Soviet Union) Igor Kurinnoy (URS)^{RUS}	(United States) Mark Densberger (USA)	(Bulgaria) K. Kantshev (BUL)
-90 kg	(Soviet Union) Khusein Khaybulayev (URS)^{RUS}	(Romania) S. Moisace (ROU)	(Bulgaria) Nikola Filipov (BUL)
-100 kg	(Soviet Union) Vyacheslav Yelistratov (URS)^{RUS}	(Bulgaria) A. Yalezkov (BUL)	(Canada) R. Angus (CAN)
+100 kg	(Soviet Union) Eduard Grams (URS)^{BLR}	(Bulgaria) Damyan Stoykov (BUL)	(United States) Roger Neff (USA)

note: Medal table is incomplete.
