= Hidetora Hanada =

Japanese gridiron football player and former sumo wrestler (born 2001)

Personal information
- Nationality: Japanese
- Born: October 30, 2001 (age 25) Wakayama, Japan
- Football career

No. 93
- Position: Defensive tackle

Personal information
- Listed height: 6 ft 1 in (1.85 m)
- Listed weight: 280 lb (127 kg)

Career information
- High school: Wakayama Commercial High School (Wakayama)
- College: Nippon Sport Science University (2022); Colorado State (2023)
- Stats at ESPN
Medal record
Representing Japan
Men's sumo
World Games
Gold medal – first place	2022 Birmingham	Heavyweight
Junior World Sumo Championships
Gold medal – first place	2018 Osaka	Openweight
Gold medal – first place	2019 Taoyuan	Openweight

Hidetora Hanada (Japanese: 花田 秀虎, Hepburn: Hanada Hidetora), born October 30, 2001) is a Japanese professional wrester, former gridiron football player and amateur sumo wrestler. He is signed to WWE. He played college football for Nippon Sport Science University and Colorado State.

== Early life ==
Hanada was born in Wakayama Prefecture. Influenced by his father, who participated in amateur sumo tournaments at national level, and his mother, a judo instructor. He experienced a variety of martial arts since his childhood, however, choosing sumo because it is impossible to have a draw and because of its simplicity. Hanada won the local wanpaku sumo when he was in the second grade of elementary school.

Before entering junior high school, he was advised to specialize in order to comply with Nishiwa Junior High School sports club registration requirements, and Hanada chose to pursue sumo activities. Hanada and other former members from their elementary school club revived the club, which had been closed due to a lack of members, also finishing second in the individual competition at the Japan Junior High School Championships in his third year.

== Amateur sumo career ==
Hanada decided to enroll in the Wakayama Commercial High School, a school with a renowned sumo club, as his middle school was nearby and he had already had the opportunity to train there with coaches who also divided their time between the two schools. There, Hanada achieved consecutive championships in the openweight division at the Junior World Sumo Championships in 2018 and 2019. In total, Hanada won seven national high school titles. At that time, he had already attracted the interest of several professional stables but decided to continue his studies at university level.

During his high school years, he also fought against future Kitanowaka and Yoshinofuji, the latter defeating him in the final of the All-Japan Junior High School Championships and in the semifinals of the Inter-High School Championships. During the Inter-High Championship in his freshman year, he was defeated in the quarterfinals by Sugarragchaagiin Byambasuren, and in his sophomore year, he was also eliminated from the competition at the same level by Yūto Suzuki.

After graduating from high school, he went to Nippon Sport Science University (NSSU), where he also won seven national championships. In 2020, Hanada won the All Japan Sumo Championship, qualifying for makushita tsukedashi status, prevailing in a competition that included amateur stars such as his NSSU classmate Pürevsürengiin Delgerbayar. With this win, Hanada became the first wrestler from his university to win the amateur yokozuna title in eight years and became the second amateur yokozuna as a freshman in 36 years since Hisashi Keita in 1984. His success at the time was attributed both to his talent and to the fact that his classmate, Daiki Nakamura, an almost undefeated star on the amateur scene, was beginning to attract the attention of many rival clubs, placing a heavy mental burden on him and leaving Hanada free to surprise other wrestlers who were ill-prepared to face him. In 2021, Hanada qualified for the final of the same championship, but was defeated by Keita Kawazoe. At the 2022 World Games, he won the heavyweight final as a first-year senior at university, defeating his classmate Daiki Nakamura, who later became professional sumo's 75th yokozuna.

For all his achievements during his amateur career, Hanada earned the nickname Sumo genius (天才力士, Tensai rikishi). Hanada, although slightly smaller than most other wrestlers, compensated for his physical shortcomings with great speed and technical skill.

During his university years, Hanada told the press that he could see his future clearly mapped out: becoming a professional, entering the top division and achieving success there before retiring and becoming a master. However, this vision bothered him, creating in him a desire to experiment more with what the sport has to offer, raising questions about a possible occupational burnout.

== College career ==
=== Departure from sumo ===
Supported by his team of coaches, Hanada decided to distance himself from sumo. He has been interested in American football and the NFL since his junior high school days, commenting that he was already incorporating elements of football into his training as early as elementary school. After careful consideration, he gained the support of Shuichi Yasuda (former CEO of Dome Corporation), who accompanied him to participate in tryouts.

In March 2022, he participated in a joint X-League tryout at Fujitsu Stadium, despite having no experience in American football, where he received numerous positive reviews for his performance, delivering a 40-yard dash time of 5.23 seconds.

Initially, Hanada was hoping to become a yokozuna in sumo and then try to join the NFL, but in September 2022, he announced that he would focus on American football first, stating that he wanted to challenge himself to see how much he could do when he was young and in his prime. The announcement came as a shock to the sumo world, as Hanada had earned a respected status after challenging Daiki Nakamura's supremacy on the amateur scene.

Hanada remained in the sumo club of NSSU, but was effectively left off, and sumo practice was completed for the time being. In the future, he still hopes to become a dual-wielding athlete (二刀流, nitōryū), becoming both an NFL player and a professional sumo yokozuna, foreshadowing a career path that set him apart from other former professionals who had tried their luck in football, such as Wakanohana and Wakanohō.

=== Various sports trials ===
Hanada showed immediate interest in gridiron football. In January 2023, Hanada was selected for the All-Japan Selection for the Dream Bowl, a friendly game against the Ivy League, but he did not participate. In February of the same year, he participated in the CFL combine held in Japan. In March, Hanada was selected along with three other Japanese players to participate in the Canadian CFL Combine in Edmonton, being selected before becoming eligible due to student status.

In July 2023, it was decided that he took a leave of absence from NSSU and transferred to Colorado State University, playing as a defensive lineman for the Rams football team and becoming the program's only Japanese player. Hanada capitalized on the growing interest he generated at the CFL Combine, turning down offers from American college powerhouses such as Texas and Ohio State.

Just before the start of the 2024 season, Hanada suffered an injury to his right shoulder and had to sit out the season's matches, forcing him to focus on the 2026 IPP drafts held in Florida to join the NFL. While waiting for the eight-week trial period, Hanada devoted himself to physical training and activities as a trainee coach, declaring that "If I don't succeed, this challenge is over". In February 2026, he gave an interview to Sports Hochi in which he announced that he had not been selected.

In February 2025, Hanada received an offer from the WWE NIL program. That month, he announced on Instagram that he had signed a NIL contract with WWE. In December 2025, Hanada graduated from Colorado State with a bachelor's degree in interdisciplinary liberal arts.

Since he turned 25 in 2026, Hanada had one last chance to try out for professional sumo in Japan, because professional sumo recruits have until the age of 25 to enlist, which marked the deadline for the September 2026 tournament. Shortly before the tournament, it was confirmed that Hanada had not begun the recruitment process, definitively closing this career opportunity for him. In February 2026, Hanada had already announced that he wanted to try his luck one last time in the NFL and was seriously exploring the idea of becoming a professional wrestler within WWE, without ruling out the option of going into the business world.

== Professional wrestling career ==
On October 27, 2026, PWInsider reported that Hanada was signed by WWE.

== Personal life ==
Hanada has a younger brother, Ryūshin Hanada, who is also successful as an amateur wrestler on the high school scene, having won the National High School Championships and the title of champion at the National High School Athletic Meet (under-100 kg category) in 2025.

Hanada's favourite NFL player is Aaron Donald.

Just like foreign wrestlers who enter professional sumo, Hanada had to get used to a different culture while living in the United States, citing the difficulty of getting used to the rhythm of classes, the language, and the food. Hanada has been friends with Hakuōhō since junior high school. When he returned to Japan in May 2024, he went to cheer him on at the Ryōgoku Kokugikan.

Although Hanada has a similar name and background to Masaru Hanada, a professional sumo wrestler who competed as Wakanohana Masaru and has experience in American football, he is not related to him. However, Hanada revealed that he met Wakanohana in 2022 and received advice.
