= The Last Laugh (2016 film) =

- Theatrical release poster
- Directed by: Ferne Pearlstein
- Written by: Robert Edwards; Ferne Pearlstein
- Cinematography: Anne Etheridge; Ferne Pearlstein
- Edited by: Ferne Pearlstein
- Release dates: April 18, 2016 (Tribeca Film Festival); March 3, 2017 (United States)
- Running time: 88 minutes
- Country: United States
- Language: English

The Last Laugh is a 2016 American documentary film directed by Ferne Pearlstein about whether jokes about the Holocaust can ever be funny.

== Synopsis ==
Is the Holocaust funny? This documentary looks at the taboo topic of humor, delving deep into pop-culture to find out where to draw the line, and whether that is a desirable—or even possible—goal. Much of the film is centered around Auschwitz survivor Renée Firestone who discusses humor in the concentration camps and finding enjoyment in life after the war.

== Cast ==
All appearing as themselves

- Mel Brooks
- Larry Charles
- Robert Clary
- David Cross
- Renée Firestone
- Gilbert Gottfried
- Jake Ehrenreich
- Lisa Lampanelli
- Carl Reiner
- Rob Reiner
- Jeff Ross
- Harry Shearer
- Sarah Silverman

Archive footage

- Jerry Lewis
- Joan Rivers

== Release ==
The Last Laugh premiered at the Tribeca Film Festival on April 18, 2016.

== Critical reception ==
The Last Laugh has earned very high critical praise. The film has a score of 98% on the review aggregator website Rotten Tomatoes, based on 46 reviews. The site's critical consensus reads, "The Last Laugh takes a fresh -- and unexpectedly funny -- approach to sensitive subject matter, uncovering affecting insights about the nature of comedy along the way."
