= Ferne Pearlstein =

American cinematographer and director

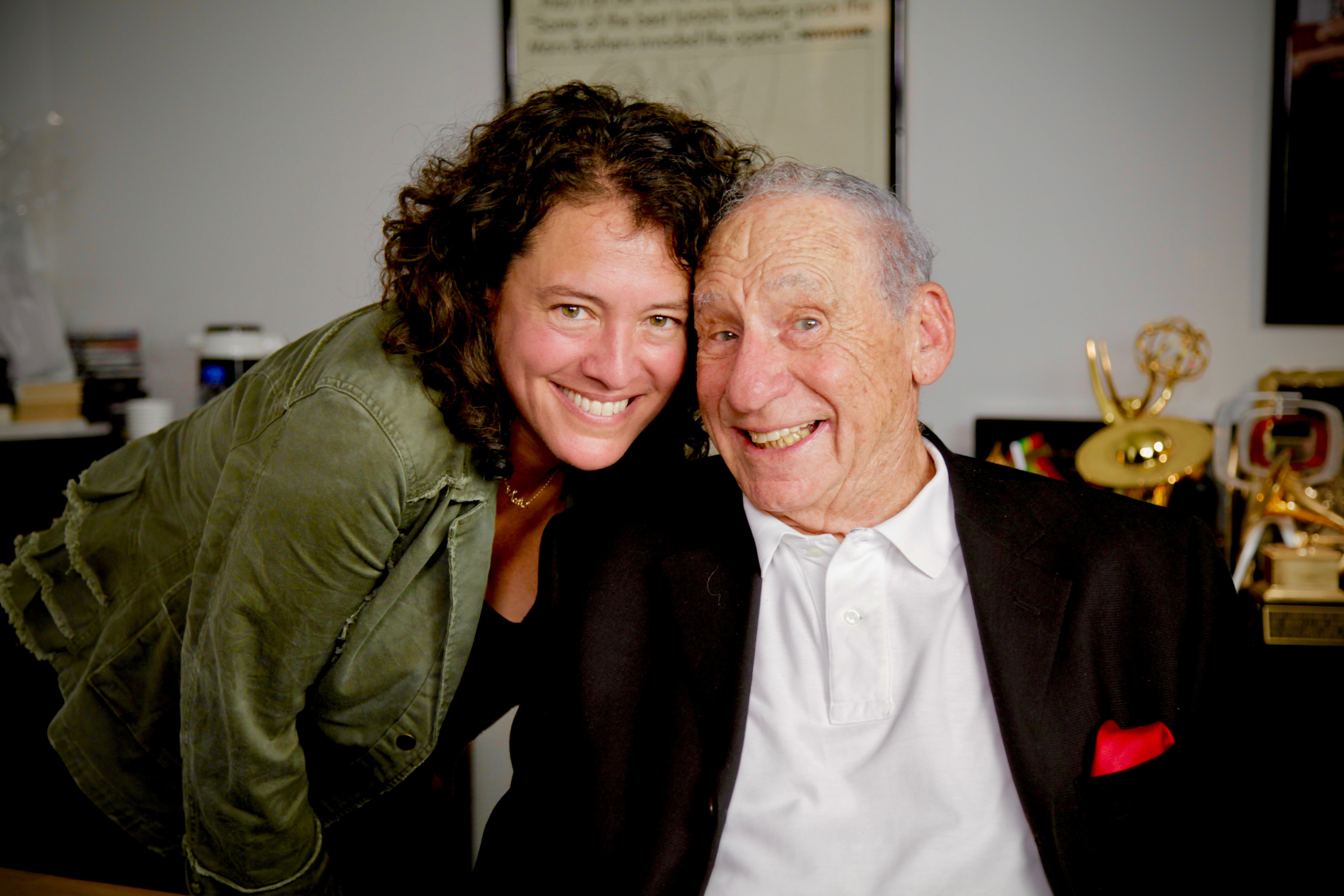
- Ferne Pearlstein with Mel Brooks in 2014, during the making of "The Last Laugh." (Photo by Robert Edwards)
- Occupations: Cinematographer; film director; producer; editor
- Years active: 1993–present

Ferne Pearlstein is an American cinematographer, film director, producer, and editor. She has directed documentary films including Sumo East and West (2003) and The Last Laugh (2016), about humor and the Holocaust. She was a cinematographer documentaries including Imelda (2003) and Freakonomics (2010).

== Education ==
Pearlstein graduated from Stanford University's Master's Program in Documentary Film, and is also a graduate of both the International Center of Photography in New York and the University of Michigan.

== Awards and recognitions ==
At the 2004 Sundance Film Festival, Pearlstein won the Excellence in Cinematography Award (Documentary) for her work on Imelda.

In 2018, Pearlstein was inducted into the Brooklyn Jewish Hall of Fame.
