= List of World Sumo Championships medalists (women) =

This is a list of world championships medalists in amateur sumo.

The International Sumo Federation (ISF) is the governing body of amateur sumo in the world. The first Women's World Championship under the ISF was held in 2001.

== Women's Individual ==
=== Lightweight ===
Meet	Gold	Silver	Bronze
2001 Hirosaki	(Norway) Lene Aanes	(Russia) Elina Novgorodtseva	(Belarus) Sviatlana Latkova
2001 Hirosaki	(Norway) Lene Aanes	(Russia) Elina Novgorodtseva	(Japan) Tamami Iwai
2002 Wroclaw	(Japan) Satomi Ishigaya	(Mongolia) Batbaatar Sainjargal	(Belarus) Sviatlana Latkova
2002 Wroclaw	(Japan) Satomi Ishigaya	(Mongolia) Batbaatar Sainjargal	(Russia) Ekaterina Lukina
2004 Rieza	(Ukraine) Alina Boykova	(Japan) Tamami Iwai	(Russia) Nelli Vorobieva
2004 Rieza	(Ukraine) Alina Boykova	(Japan) Tamami Iwai	(Poland) Ewelina Lasecka
2005 Osaka	(Japan) Satomi Ishigaya	(Germany) Steffi Müller	(Ukraine) Alina Boykova
2005 Osaka	(Japan) Satomi Ishigaya	(Germany) Steffi Müller	(Netherlands) Claudia de Graauw
2006 Osaka	(Ukraine) Alina Boykova	(Poland) Ewelina Lasecka	(Russia) Nelli Vorobyeva
2006 Osaka	(Ukraine) Alina Boykova	(Poland) Ewelina Lasecka	(Mongolia) Enkhzaya Selenge
2007 Chiang Mai	(Russia) Nelli Vorobyeva	(Ukraine) Alina Boykova	(Mongolia) Enkhzaya Selenge
2007 Chiang Mai	(Russia) Nelli Vorobyeva	(Ukraine) Alina Boykova	(Italy) Paola Boz
2008 Rakvere	(Russia) Nelli Vorobyeva	(Italy) Paola Boz	(Japan) Satomi Taira
2008 Rakvere	(Russia) Nelli Vorobyeva	(Italy) Paola Boz	(Ukraine) Alina Boykova
2010 Warsaw	(Ukraine) Alina Boykova	(Japan) Yukina Iwamoto	(Bulgaria) Anna Metodieva
2010 Warsaw	(Ukraine) Alina Boykova	(Japan) Yukina Iwamoto	(Brazil) Luciana Watanabe
2012 Hong Kong	(Ukraine) Alina Boykova	(Russia) Vera Koval	(Brazil) Luciana Watanabe
2012 Hong Kong	(Ukraine) Alina Boykova	(Russia) Vera Koval	(Japan) Miku Yamanaka
2014 Kaohsiung	(Russia) Vera Koval	(Japan) Miku Yamanaka	(Brazil) Luciana Watanabe
2014 Kaohsiung	(Russia) Vera Koval	(Japan) Miku Yamanaka	(Ukraine) Alina Boykova
2015 Osaka	(Russia) Daria Ibragimova	(Ukraine) Alina Boykova	(Poland) Monika Skiba
2015 Osaka	(Russia) Daria Ibragimova	(Ukraine) Alina Boykova	(Japan) Miku Yamanaka
2016 Ulaanbaatar	(Ukraine) Alina Boykova	(Japan) Miku Yamanaka	(Hungary) Fruzsina Forgó
2016 Ulaanbaatar	(Ukraine) Alina Boykova	(Japan) Miku Yamanaka	(Russia) Vera Koval
2018 Taoyuan	(Russia) Vera Koval	(Mongolia) Enkhbuyan Erdenbaatar	(Poland) Magdalena Macios
2018 Taoyuan	(Russia) Vera Koval	(Mongolia) Enkhbuyan Erdenbaatar	(Ukraine) Svitlana Trosiuk
2019 Osaka	(Ukraine) Alina Duzhenko	(Russia) Vera Koval	(Poland) Aleksandra Rozum
2019 Osaka	(Ukraine) Alina Duzhenko	(Russia) Vera Koval	(Japan) Yuka Okutomi
2023 Tokyo	(Hungary) Eniko Elekes	(Chinese Taipei) Sz-Hua Wang	(Japan) Nene Yamashita
2023 Tokyo	(Hungary) Eniko Elekes	(Chinese Taipei) Sz-Hua Wang	(Poland) Aleksandra Rozum
2024 Krotoszyn	(Japan) Nene Yamashita	(Norway) Rikke Juell Bugge	(Poland) Aleksandra Rozum
2024 Krotoszyn	(Japan) Nene Yamashita	(Norway) Rikke Juell Bugge	(Ukraine) Sofia Kushnir
2025 Bangkok	(Japan) Hana Kishimoto	(Ukraine) Sofia Kushnir	(Poland) Natalia Bednarska
2025 Bangkok	(Japan) Hana Kishimoto	(Ukraine) Sofia Kushnir	(Hungary) Elza Kaszás
2026 Baku	(Ukraine) Tetiana Karachenko	(Japan) Nene Yamashita	(Bulgaria) Mihaela Hristova
2026 Baku	(Ukraine) Tetiana Karachenko	(Japan) Nene Yamashita	(Poland) Natalia Bednarska

=== Middleweight ===
Meet	Gold	Silver	Bronze
2001 Hirosaki	(Japan) Satomi Ishigaya	(Russia) Natalia Bobkina	(Norway) Linda Holmeide
2001 Hirosaki	(Japan) Satomi Ishigaya	(Russia) Natalia Bobkina	(Estonia) Victoria Kuznetsova
2002 Wroclaw	(Poland) Edyta Witkowska	(Bulgaria) Galina Ivanova	(Russia) Marina Dvoretskaya
2002 Wroclaw	(Poland) Edyta Witkowska	(Bulgaria) Galina Ivanova	(Japan) Mina Saito
2004 Rieza	(Russia) Svetlana Panteleeva	(Japan) Satomi Ishigaya	(Bulgaria) Galina Ivanova
2004 Rieza	(Russia) Svetlana Panteleeva	(Japan) Satomi Ishigaya	(Netherlands) Hanah Weerkamp
2005 Osaka	(Russia) Svetlana Panteleeva	(Estonia) Erge Nugis	(Thailand) Saguna Chalermthip
2005 Osaka	(Russia) Svetlana Panteleeva	(Estonia) Erge Nugis	(Netherlands) Hanah Weerkamp
2006 Osaka	(Russia) Svetlana Panteleeva	(Netherlands) Hanah Weerkamp	(Brazil) Alexandra Marques
2006 Osaka	(Russia) Svetlana Panteleeva	(Netherlands) Hanah Weerkamp	(Thailand) Saguna Chalermthip
2007 Chiang Mai	(Japan) Asano Matsuura	(Germany) Nicole Hehemann	(Russia) Marina Dvoretskaya
2007 Chiang Mai	(Japan) Asano Matsuura	(Germany) Nicole Hehemann	(Netherlands) Hanah Weerkamp
2008 Rakvere	(Ukraine) Maryna Pryshchepa	(Estonia) Epp Mae	(Russia) Marina Dvoretskaya
2008 Rakvere	(Ukraine) Maryna Pryshchepa	(Estonia) Epp Mae	(Germany) Nicole Hehemann
2010 Warsaw	(Mongolia) Yadmaa Dulmaa	(Bulgaria) Mariya Georgieva	(Russia) Anna Alexandrova
2010 Warsaw	(Mongolia) Yadmaa Dulmaa	(Bulgaria) Mariya Georgieva	(Ukraine) Maryna Maksymenko
2012 Hong Kong	(Russia) Svetlana Panteleeva	(Mongolia) Munkhtsetseg Otgon	(Japan) Asano Matsuura
2012 Hong Kong	(Russia) Svetlana Panteleeva	(Mongolia) Munkhtsetseg Otgon	(Ukraine) Maryna Pryshchepa
2014 Kaohsiung	(Russia) Anna Alexandrova	(Bulgaria) Mariya Oryashkova	(Japan) Asano Matsuura
2014 Kaohsiung	(Russia) Anna Alexandrova	(Bulgaria) Mariya Oryashkova	(Mongolia) Munkhtsetseg Otgon
2015 Osaka	(Ukraine) Maryna Maksymenko	(Bulgaria) Mariya Oryashkova	(Mongolia) Munkhtsetseg Otgon
2015 Osaka	(Ukraine) Maryna Maksymenko	(Bulgaria) Mariya Oryashkova	(Russia) Anna Alexandrova
2016 Ulaanbaatar	(Ukraine) Maryna Maksymenko	(Mongolia) Munkhtsetseg Otgon	(Poland) Olimpia Robakowska
2016 Ulaanbaatar	(Ukraine) Maryna Maksymenko	(Mongolia) Munkhtsetseg Otgon	(Russia) Anna Alexandrova
2018 Taoyuan	(Russia) Anna Alexandrova	(Bulgaria) Mariya Oryashkova	(Japan) Sakura Ishii
2018 Taoyuan	(Russia) Anna Alexandrova	(Bulgaria) Mariya Oryashkova	(Ukraine) Makyna Maksymenko
2019 Osaka	(Poland) Magda Skrajnowska	(Ukraine) Karyna Kolesnik	(Japan) Nagisa Matsumoto
2019 Osaka	(Poland) Magda Skrajnowska	(Ukraine) Karyna Kolesnik	(Germany) Daniela Schidtsdorf
2023 Tokyo	(Ukraine) Karyna Kolesnik	(Brazil) Luciana Watanabe	(Poland) Monika Skiba
2023 Tokyo	(Ukraine) Karyna Kolesnik	(Brazil) Luciana Watanabe	(Japan) Rio Hasegawa
2024 Krotoszyn	(Japan) Rio Hasegawa	(Ukraine) Tetiana Karachenko	(Poland) Monika Skiba
2024 Krotoszyn	(Japan) Rio Hasegawa	(Ukraine) Tetiana Karachenko	(Brazil) Luciana Watanabe
2025 Bangkok	(Ukraine) Tetiana Karachenko	(Japan) Rio Hasegawa	(Poland) Monika Skiba
2025 Bangkok	(Ukraine) Tetiana Karachenko	(Japan) Rio Hasegawa	(Brazil) Luciana Watanabe
2026 Baku	(Japan) Ami Fukuzato	(Poland) Monika Skiba	(Ukraine) Olena Nikitinka
2026 Baku	(Japan) Ami Fukuzato	(Poland) Monika Skiba	(Norway) Rikke Juell Bugge

=== Light Heavyweight ===
Meet	Gold	Silver	Bronze
2019 Osaka	(Ukraine) Maryna Maksymenko	(Japan) Sakura Ishii	(Bulgaria) Mariya Oryashkova
2019 Osaka	(Ukraine) Maryna Maksymenko	(Japan) Sakura Ishii	(Russia) Anna Alexandrova
2023 Tokyo	(Ukraine) Maryna Maksymenko	(Norway) Pernille Oddlien	(Poland) Oliwia Glegolska
2023 Tokyo	(Ukraine) Maryna Maksymenko	(Norway) Pernille Oddlien	(Japan) Mikoto Okuyama
2024 Krotoszyn	(Japan) Sakura Ishii	(Ukraine) Daria Konstantynova	(Chinese Taipei) Ting-Yun Kuo
2024 Krotoszyn	(Japan) Sakura Ishii	(Ukraine) Daria Konstantynova	(Poland) Oliwia Glegolska
2025 Bangkok	(Ukraine) Karyna Kolesnik	(Japan) Sakura Ishii	(Chinese Taipei) Sun-Ching Hsu
2025 Bangkok	(Ukraine) Karyna Kolesnik	(Japan) Sakura Ishii	(Estonia) Merily Vaster
2026 Baku	(Japan) Sakura Ishii	(Chinese Taipei) Sun-Ching Hsu	(Bulgaria) Stanislava Atanasova
2026 Baku	(Japan) Sakura Ishii	(Chinese Taipei) Sun-Ching Hsu	(Ukraine) Daria Konstantynova

=== Heavyweight ===
Meet	Gold	Silver	Bronze
2001 Hirosaki	(Belarus) Veranika Kazlovskaya	(Estonia) Mille Sang	(Germany) Britta Kreth
2001 Hirosaki	(Belarus) Veranika Kazlovskaya	(Estonia) Mille Sang	(Brazil) Fernanda da Costa Pereira
2002 Wroclaw	(Russia) Olessia Kovalenko	(Brazil) Fernanda da Costa Pereira	(Belarus) Veranika Kazlovskaya
2002 Wroclaw	(Russia) Olessia Kovalenko	(Brazil) Fernanda da Costa Pereira	(Bulgaria) Tsvetana Bozhilova
2004 Rieza	(Brazil) Fernanda da Costa Pereira	(Poland) Edyta Witkowska	(Netherlands) Manuela van den Brink
2004 Rieza	(Brazil) Fernanda da Costa Pereira	(Poland) Edyta Witkowska	(Russia) Ekaterina Keyb
2005 Osaka	(Germany) Sandra Köppen	(Poland) Edyta Witkowska	(Mongolia) Sunjidmaa Khishigdorj
2005 Osaka	(Germany) Sandra Köppen	(Poland) Edyta Witkowska	(Russia) Olesya Kovalenko
2006 Osaka	(Russia) Olesya Kovalenko	(Germany) Sandra Köppen	(Brazil) Ana Cláudia Souza
2006 Osaka	(Russia) Olesya Kovalenko	(Germany) Sandra Köppen	(Bulgaria) Tsvetana Bozhilova
2007 Chiang Mai	(Russia) Olesya Kovalenko	(Ukraine) Olga Davydko	(Bulgaria) Tsvetana Bozhilova
2007 Chiang Mai	(Russia) Olesya Kovalenko	(Ukraine) Olga Davydko	(Hungary) Erika Makai
2008 Rakvere	(Ukraine) Olga Davydko	(Russia) Olesya Kovalenko	(Poland) Edyta Witkowska
2008 Rakvere	(Ukraine) Olga Davydko	(Russia) Olesya Kovalenko	(Chinese Taipei) Chiu-Jung Cheng
2010 Warsaw	(Russia) Anna Zhigalova	(Hungary) Erika Makai	(Mongolia) Sunjidmaa Khishigdorj
2010 Warsaw	(Russia) Anna Zhigalova	(Hungary) Erika Makai	(Ukraine) Olga Davydko
2012 Hong Kong	(Russia) Anna Zhigalova	(Mongolia) Sunjidmaa Khishigdorj	(Ukraine) Svitlana Yaromka
2012 Hong Kong	(Russia) Anna Zhigalova	(Mongolia) Sunjidmaa Khishigdorj	(Japan) Asumi Yachi
2014 Kaohsiung	(Ukraine) Mariia Drboian	(Poland) Jagoda Mazurek	(Mongolia) Sunjidmaa Khishigdorj
2014 Kaohsiung	(Ukraine) Mariia Drboian	(Poland) Jagoda Mazurek	(Thailand) Viparat Vituteerasan
2015 Osaka	(Mongolia) Sunjidmaa Khishigdorj	(Ukraine) Mariia Drboian	(Japan) Emi Inaba
2015 Osaka	(Mongolia) Sunjidmaa Khishigdorj	(Ukraine) Mariia Drboian	(Thailand) Viparat Vituteerasan
2016 Ulaanbaatar	(Mongolia) Sunjidmaa Khishigdorj	(Ukraine) Mariia Drboian	(Russia) Olga Davydko
2016 Ulaanbaatar	(Mongolia) Sunjidmaa Khishigdorj	(Ukraine) Mariia Drboian	(Japan) Emi Inaba
2018 Taoyuan	(Russia) Olga Davydko	(Ukraine) Ivanna Berezovska	(Thailand) Viparat Vituteerasan
2018 Taoyuan	(Russia) Olga Davydko	(Ukraine) Ivanna Berezovska	(Japan) Airi Hisano
2019 Osaka	(Russia) Anna Zhigalova	(Ukraine) Ivanna Berezovska	(Mongolia) Tuvshinjargal Bumerdene
2019 Osaka	(Russia) Anna Zhigalova	(Ukraine) Ivanna Berezovska	(Japan) Airi Hisano
2023 Tokyo	(Ukraine) Ivanna Berezovska	(Japan) Hiyori Kon	(Thailand) Kankhanit Choosri
2023 Tokyo	(Ukraine) Ivanna Berezovska	(Japan) Hiyori Kon	not awarded
2024 Krotoszyn	(Ukraine) Ivanna Berezovska	(United States) Kellyann Ball	(Poland) Wioleta Zajac
2024 Krotoszyn	(Ukraine) Ivanna Berezovska	(United States) Kellyann Ball	not awarded
2025 Bangkok	(Ukraine) Ivanna Berezovska	(United States) Eros Armstrong	(Germany) Marie-Luis Zuckschwerd
2025 Bangkok	(Ukraine) Ivanna Berezovska	(United States) Eros Armstrong	not awarded
2026 Baku	(Ukraine) Iryna Pasichnyk	(United States) Kellyann Ball	(Chinese Taipei) En-Sin Chen
2026 Baku	(Ukraine) Iryna Pasichnyk	(United States) Kellyann Ball	(Poland) Zuzanna Krystek

=== Openweight ===
Meet	Gold	Silver	Bronze
2001 Hirosaki	(Germany) Sandra Köppen	(Russia) Ioulia Khekhneva	(Japan) Rie Tsuihiji
2001 Hirosaki	(Germany) Sandra Köppen	(Russia) Ioulia Khekhneva	(Brazil) Érica Sanusa Chagas
2002 Wroclaw	(Japan) Rie Tsuihiji	(Russia) Loulia Khekhneva	(Belarus) Maryna Chuprys
2002 Wroclaw	(Japan) Rie Tsuihiji	(Russia) Loulia Khekhneva	(Hungary) Gyöngyi Kállo
2004 Rieza	(Germany) Sandra Köppen	(Russia) Marina Dvoretskaya	(Hungary) Anna József
2004 Rieza	(Germany) Sandra Köppen	(Russia) Marina Dvoretskaya	(Japan) Rie Tsuihiji
2005 Osaka	(Russia) Ekaterina Keyb	(Netherlands) Manuela van den Brink	(Japan) Rie Tsuihiji
2005 Osaka	(Russia) Ekaterina Keyb	(Netherlands) Manuela van den Brink	(Hungary) Gyöngyi Kállo
2006 Osaka	(Russia) Anna Zhigalova	(United Kingdom) Adele Jones	(Ukraine) Olga Davydko
2006 Osaka	(Russia) Anna Zhigalova	(United Kingdom) Adele Jones	(Hungary) Gyöngyi Kállo
2007 Chiang Mai	(Russia) Ekaterina Keyb	(Netherlands) Françoise Harteveld	(Japan) Yuka Ueta
2007 Chiang Mai	(Russia) Ekaterina Keyb	(Netherlands) Françoise Harteveld	(Hungary) Gyöngyi Kállo
2008 Rakvere	(Russia) Anna Zhigalova	(Netherlands) Françoise Harteveld	(Ukraine) Maryna Maksymenko
2008 Rakvere	(Russia) Anna Zhigalova	(Netherlands) Françoise Harteveld	(Poland) Sylwia Krzemien
2010 Warsaw	(Poland) Sylvia Krzemien	(Netherlands) Françoise Harteveld	(Bulgaria) Tsvetana Bozhilova
2010 Warsaw	(Poland) Sylvia Krzemien	(Netherlands) Françoise Harteveld	(Hungary) Gyöngyi Kállo
2012 Hong Kong	(Japan) Yuka Ueta	(Russia) Olesya Kovalenko	(Netherlands) Françoise Harteveld
2012 Hong Kong	(Japan) Yuka Ueta	(Russia) Olesya Kovalenko	(Hungary) Gyöngyi Kállo
2014 Kaohsiung	(Russia) Anna Zhigalova	(Bulgaria) Mariya Georgieva	(Ukraine) Ivanna Berezovska
2014 Kaohsiung	(Russia) Anna Zhigalova	(Bulgaria) Mariya Georgieva	(Japan) Yuka Ueta
2015 Osaka	(Russia) Anna Zhigalova	(Ukraine) Ivanna Berezovska	(Hungary) Vivien Sarkany
2015 Osaka	(Russia) Anna Zhigalova	(Ukraine) Ivanna Berezovska	(Mongolia) Zoljargal Dagvadorj
2016 Ulaanbaatar	(Russia) Anna Zhigalova	(Thailand) Viparat Vituteerasan	(Ukraine) Ivanna Berezovska
2016 Ulaanbaatar	(Russia) Anna Zhigalova	(Thailand) Viparat Vituteerasan	(Mongolia) Batchimeg Baast
2018 Taoyuan	(Russia) Anna Zhigalova	(Japan) Hiyori Kon	(Ukraine) Viktoriia Tsaruk
2018 Taoyuan	(Russia) Anna Zhigalova	(Japan) Hiyori Kon	(Mongolia) Batchimeg Baast
2019 Osaka	(Ukraine) Svitlana Yaromka	(Japan) Hiyori Kon	(Chinese Taipei) Pei-Yu Sun
2019 Osaka	(Ukraine) Svitlana Yaromka	(Japan) Hiyori Kon	(Mongolia) Zoljargal Dagvadorj
2023 Tokyo	(Japan) Airi Hisano	(Norway) Cathrine Alida Frilset	(Poland) Zuzanna Krystek
2023 Tokyo	(Japan) Airi Hisano	(Norway) Cathrine Alida Frilset	(Ukraine) Viktoriia Tsaruk
2024 Krotoszyn	(Ukraine) Iryna Pasichnyk	(Norway) Cathrine Alida Frilset	(Japan) Airi Hisano
2024 Krotoszyn	(Ukraine) Iryna Pasichnyk	(Norway) Cathrine Alida Frilset	(Uzbekistan) Durdona Abdujabborova
2025 Bangkok	(Ukraine) Iryna Pasichnyk	(Norway) Cathrine Alida Frilset	(Japan) Airi Hisano
2025 Bangkok	(Ukraine) Iryna Pasichnyk	(Norway) Cathrine Alida Frilset	(Uzbekistan) Durdona Abdujabborova
2026 Baku	(Ukraine) Yelyzaveta Morenko	(Uzbekistan) Durdona Abdujabborova	(United States) Etan Perez
2026 Baku	(Ukraine) Yelyzaveta Morenko	(Uzbekistan) Durdona Abdujabborova	(Canada) Nadia Cardin-Ouellette

== Women's Teams ==
Year	1st place	2nd place	3rd	3rd
2001	Germany	Norway	Japan	Russia
2002	Japan	Germany	Mongolia	Brazil
2004	Germany	Russia	Japan	Brazil
2005	Russia	Mongolia	Hungary	Ukraine
2006	Russia	Ukraine	Mongolia	Japan
2007	Russia	Ukraine	Japan	Netherlands
2008	Russia	Ukraine	Poland	Japan
2010	Japan	Mongolia	Brazil	Russia
2012	Russia	Ukraine	Poland	Japan
2014	Russia	Ukraine	Chinese Taipei	Japan
2015	Ukraine	Japan	Russia	Mongolia
2016	Russia	Mongolia	Japan	Ukraine
2018	Russia	Japan	Thailand	Ukraine
2019	Russia	Japan	Thailand	Ukraine
2023	Ukraine	Japan	United States	Poland
2024	Ukraine	Japan	United States	Poland
2025	Japan	United States	Ukraine	Brazil
2026	Ukraine	United States	Chinese Taipei	Japan

== See also ==
- Sumo World Championships
- List of World Sumo Championships medalists (men)
- List of World Sumo Championships medalists (junior men)
- List of World Sumo Championships medalists (junior women)
