= Sumo at the 2022 World Games – Men's heavyweight =

Sumo – Men's heavyweight at the 2022 World Games
- Venue: Boutwell Auditorium, Birmingham, United States
- Dates: 9 July 2022
- Competitors: 16 from 8 nations

Medalists
gold medal	(Japan) Hidetora Hanada
silver medal	(Japan) Daiki Nakamura
bronze medal	(Brazil) Rui Junior

The men's heavyweight competition in sumo at the 2022 World Games took place on 9 July 2022, at the Boutwell Auditorium in Birmingham, Alabama, United States.

== Competition format ==
A total of 16 athletes entered the competition. They fought in the cup system with repechages.

== Results ==
=== Main draw ===
Round of 16
(Brazil) Rui Junior	W
(United States) Angel Delatorre
(Japan) Daiki Nakamura	W
(Egypt) Ibrahim Abdellatif
(Japan) Atsushi Igarashi	W
(Poland) Mateusz Linka
(Venezuela) Moisés Pérez	W
(United States) Roy Sims
(Ukraine) Oleksandr Veresiuk
(Poland) Jacek Piersiak	W
(Japan) Hidetora Hanada	W
(United States) Robert Fuimaono
(Hungary) Robert Kerstner	W
(Brazil) Alysson Salles
(Egypt) Abdelrahman Obaid	W
(United States) Gilberto de la Torre

Quarter-finals
(Brazil) Rui Junior
(Japan) Daiki Nakamura	W
(Japan) Atsushi Igarashi	W
(Venezuela) Moisés Pérez
(Poland) Jacek Piersiak
(Japan) Hidetora Hanada	W
(Hungary) Robert Kerstner
(Egypt) Abdelrahman Obaid	W

Semi-finals
(Japan) Daiki Nakamura	W
(Japan) Atsushi Igarashi
(Japan) Hidetora Hanada	W
(Egypt) Abdelrahman Obaid

Final
(Japan) Daiki Nakamura
(Japan) Hidetora Hanada	W

=== Repechages ===
Round of 16 Repechage
(Brazil) Rui Junior	W
(Egypt) Ibrahim Abdellatif
(Venezuela) Moisés Pérez	W
(Poland) Mateusz Linka
(Poland) Jacek Piersiak	W
(United States) Robert Fuimaono
(Hungary) Robert Kerstner	W
(United States) Gilberto de la Torre

Quarter-finals repechage
(Brazil) Rui Junior	W
(Venezuela) Moisés Pérez
(Poland) Jacek Piersiak	W
(Hungary) Robert Kerstner

Semi-finals reprechage
(Egypt) Abdelrahman Obaid
(Brazil) Rui Junior	W
(Poland) Jacek Piersiak	W
(Japan) Atsushi Igarashi

Bronze medal contest
(Brazil) Rui Junior	W
(Poland) Jacek Piersiak
