= Renée Firestone =

Hungarian-American Holocaust survivor, educator and fashion designer

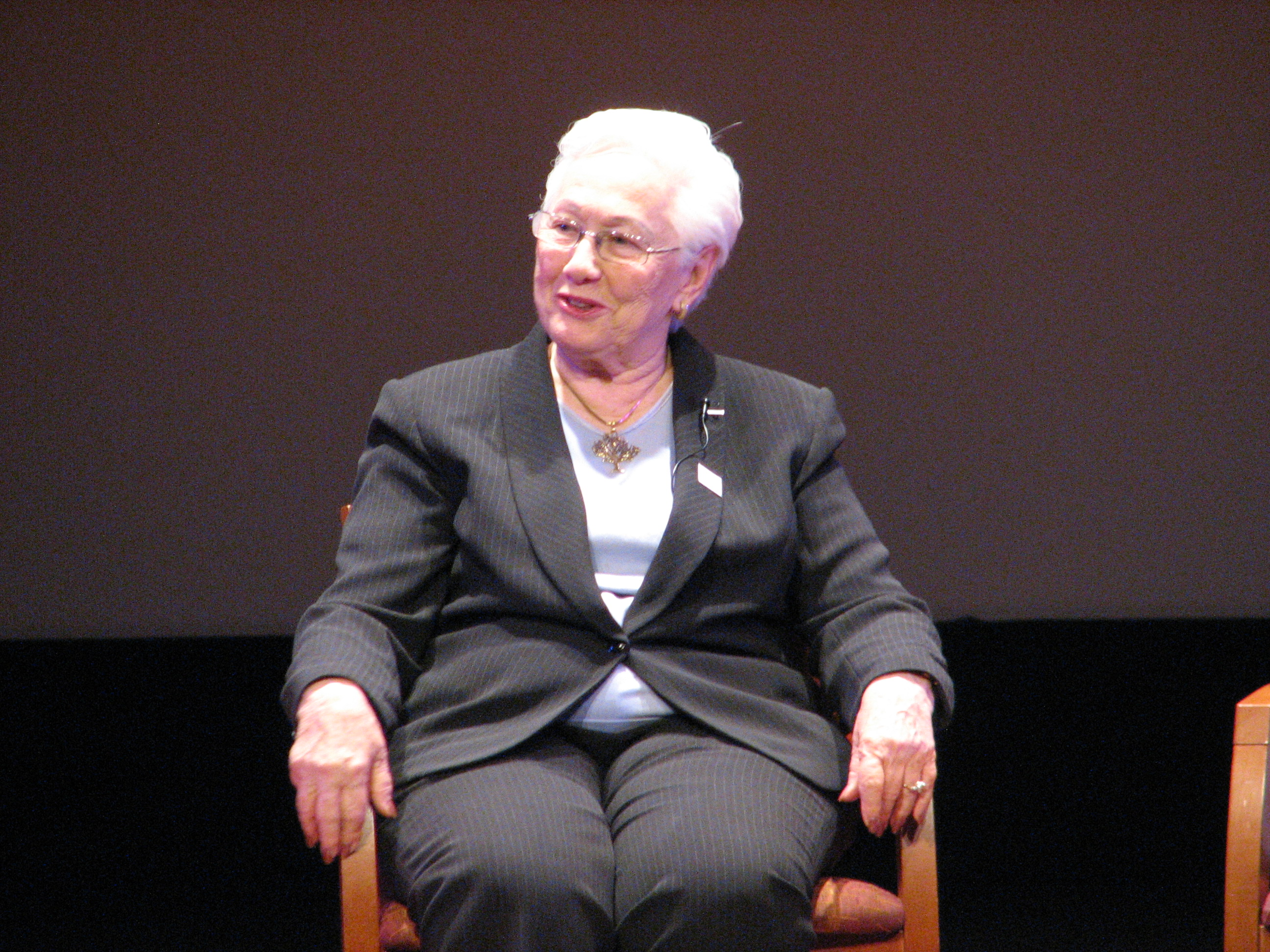
- Born: Renée Weinfeld; April 13, 1924 (age 102); Uzhhorod, Czechoslovakia
- Occupations: Fashion designer; Holocaust educator

Renée Firestone (née Weinfeld; born April 13, 1924) is a Czechoslovak-Jewish survivor of the Holocaust and educator, who became known for her fashion designs in the 1960s after she immigrated to the United States.

== Early life ==
Born Renée Weinfeld in Uzhhorod, Czechoslovakia on April 13, 1924, she lived in an area annexed into Hungary in 1938. She was deported to Auschwitz concentration camp in 1944 along with her family when she was 19. She lost her mother and a sister there, then survived a death march before she was liberated in 1945. Her father also survived, but died of tuberculosis soon after.

She married a man in Prague that had survived a forced labor camp in Hungary and then Mauthausen concentration camp. They immigrated to the United States in 1948 and settled in Los Angeles, California.

== Career ==
Firestone became a successful fashion designer and Holocaust educator. She first collaborated with fashion designer Rudi Gernreich in the 1950s, before starting her own clothing line in 1960. In 2012 she was featured in the Museum of California Design's "California's Designing Women: 1896—1986" exhibit. Some of her fashion designs are in the Los Angeles County Museum of Art's (LACMA) permanent collection.

Starting in 1977, Firestone devoted herself to educating others about the Holocaust, and she has spoken widely. In 2012 she testified for the U.S. Senate Judiciary Committee on Holocaust-Era Claims in the 21st Century. In 2018 she said, "Get to know each other. People don't know each other. You have to understand we are all the same...If you don't know someone, it's just a stranger to you and it's very easy to get rid of a stranger."

== In media ==
Firestone is one of five Hungarian Holocaust survivors whose story was featured in the 1998 Academy Award-winning documentary movie, The Last Days. It was produced by June Beallor, Kenneth Lipper, Steven Spielberg, and the Survivors of the Shoah Visual History Foundation. The film was remastered and scheduled for wider release in 2021 by Netflix.

Firestone is one of the main subjects of the 2016 documentary film The Last Laugh, directed by Ferne Pearlstein. In the film, Firestone made her position clear on using humor about the Holocaust as a means of survival and resistance: "It's OK to make fun of the Nazis, but not about the killing. Making fun of the Nazis is OK with me."

Firestone is also one of six women featured in the 2017 documentary film After Auschwitz, directed by Jon Kean. The film follows the lives of these women survivors after liberation from Auschwitz and immigration to America. Writing for The New York Times, reviewer Ken Jaworowski said the film shows how they faced hope and struggles, and ultimately a measure of peace. He wrote, "The anguish that underlies 'After Auschwitz' is profound. Yet hope still flickers throughout this documentary...Starting with the Allied liberation of the concentration camps, the film traces the women's experiences using interviews and news footage, some of it horribly brutal...This valuable film highlights the women's later successes." Frank Scheck wrote for The Hollywood Reporter, "After Auschwitz proves an inspiring testament to the indomitability of the human spirit."

In 2021, Firestone was featured as an interactive holographic image at the Holocaust Museum LA for the museum's 60th anniversary. Visitors to the Dimensions in Testimony holographic exhibit, created by the USC Shoah Foundation, were able to ask questions that Firestone's image answered in real time.

== Awards ==
Museum of California Design (MOCAD), Los Angeles, 2012
