= Moussa Sall =

Senegalese judoka

Personal information
- Nationality: Senegalese
- Born: 8 September 1966 (age 58)

Sport
- Sport: Judo

Moussa Sall (born 8 September 1966) is a Senegalese former judoka. He competed in the men's half-heavyweight event at the 1992 Summer Olympics.
