= 2024 in American football =

This article lists the American football events for 2024.

== Club competitions ==
=== Professional football ===
==== National Football League ====
- February 4: 2024 Pro Bowl Games in Orlando, Florida
  - National Football Conference defeated American Football Conference, 64-59
- February 11: Super Bowl LVIII in Las Vegas
  - Kansas City Chiefs defeated San Francisco 49ers, 25-22 (OT)
- April 25–27: 2024 NFL draft in Detroit
  - #1 pick: (California) Caleb Williams
- September 5, 2024 – January 5, 2025: 2024 NFL season

==== United Football League ====
- January 1: The UFL forms from the merger of the XFL and USFL
- January 5 – January 15: 2024 UFL dispersal draft
- March 30 – June 8: 2024 UFL season
- June 16: 2024 UFL championship game in St. Louis
  - (Alabama) Birmingham Stallions defeat (Texas) San Antonio Brahmas, 25–0.
- July 17: 2024 UFL draft
  - #1 pick: (Kansas) Jason Bean

==== Indoor American football ====
- Arena Football League
  - April 27 – June 30: 2024 Arena Football League season
  - July 19: ArenaBowl XXXIII in (New Jersey) East Rutherford
    - (Montana) Billings Outlaws defeat (New York (state)) Albany Firebirds, 46–41.
  - September 4: The AFL collapses and its teams form Arena Football One.
- Indoor Football League
  - March 16 – July 21: 2024 Indoor Football League season
  - August 17: 2024 IFL National Championship game in (Nevada) Henderson
    - Arizona Rattlers defeat Massachusetts Pirates, 53–16.
- National Arena League
  - March 15 – June 9: 2024 National Arena League season
  - June 15: 2024 NAL Championship Game in (Nebraska) Ralston
    - (Nebraska) Omaha Beef defeat (Iowa) Sioux City Bandits, 47–46 (2OT).
- American Indoor Football
  - March 24 – June 8: 2024 American Indoor Football season
  - June 14: 2024 AIF Championship Game in (Georgia (U.S. state)) Columbus
    - (Georgia (U.S. state)) Columbus Lions defeat (Texas) Corpus Christi Tritons, 46–20.
- The Arena League
  - June 1 - July 27: 2024 TAL season
  - August 10: ArenaMania I in (Minnesota) Duluth
    - (Minnesota) Duluth Harbor Monsters defeat Iowa Woo, 46–44.

==== European League of Football ====
- May 25 – August 25: 2024 European League of Football season
- September 22: 2024 ELF Championship in (Germany) Gelsenkirchen
  - (Germany) Rhein Fire defeat (Austria) Vienna Vikings, 51–20.

=== College football ===
2023–24 NCAA football bowl games

- January 1: College Football Playoff Semifinals
  - 2024 Rose Bowl in Pasadena, California
    - The Michigan Wolverines defeated the Alabama Crimson Tide, 27–20 in overtime.
  - 2024 Sugar Bowl in New Orleans
    - The Washington Huskies defeated the Texas Longhorns, 37–31.
- January 8: 2024 CFP National Championship in Houston
  - The Michigan Wolverines defeated the Washington Huskies, 34–13

2024–25 NCAA football bowl games

- December 31: College Football Playoff Qyarterfinals
  - 2024 Fiesta Bowl in Glendale, Arizona
    - The Penn State Nittany Lions defeated the Boise State Broncos, 31–14

2024 college football seasons

- 2024 NCAA Division I FBS football season
- 2024 NCAA Division I FCS football season
- 2024 NCAA Division II football season
- 2024 NCAA Division III football season
- 2024 NAIA football season
- 2024 NAIA flag football season
- 2024 junior college football season

== Attendances ==
The teams of the NFL, the most valuable American football league in the world, by average home attendance in 2024:

#	NFL team	Home games	Average attendance
1	Dallas Cowboys	9	80,000¹
2	New York Jets	7	78,789
3	New York Giants	9	78,470
4	Green Bay Packers	9	78,003
5	Denver Broncos	8	73,969
6	Los Angeles Rams	9	73,194
7	San Francisco 49ers	9	71,422
8	Atlanta Falcons	9	71,381
9	Houston Texans	8	71,333
10	Baltimore Ravens	8	71,052
11	Buffalo Bills	8	70,695
12	Carolina Panthers	9	70,612
13	New Orleans Saints	9	70,012
14	Los Angeles Chargers	8	69,966
15	Philadelphia Eagles	8	69,879
16	Seattle Seahawks	9	68,660
17	Cleveland Browns	8	67,726
18	Pittsburgh Steelers	8	66,880
19	Cincinnati Bengals	8	66,294
20	Minnesota Vikings	9	66,286
21	Indianapolis Colts	8	65,767
22	Jacksonville Jaguars	8	65,764
23	Miami Dolphins	8	65,643
24	Detroit Lions	9	64,922
25	Tennessee Titans	8	64,819
26	New England Patriots	8	64,634
27	Arizona Cardinals	9	63,975
28	Tampa Bay Buccaneers	9	63,689
29	Washington Commanders	9	63,428
30	Las Vegas Raiders	8	62,175
31	Chicago Bears	9	58,649
32	Kansas City Chiefs	8	55,194

¹ 92,972 with people watching on screens at the party decks
