= Sumo East and West =

2003 documentary film

- Directed by: Ferne Pearlstein
- Produced by: Ferne Pearlstein; Robert Edwards
- Cinematography: Ferne Pearlstein
- Edited by: Ferne Pearlstein; Robert Edwards
- Music by: Doug Edwards
- Release date: May 2003 (Tribeca Film Festival)
- Running time: 85 minutes
- Country: United States
- Language: English

Sumo East and West is a 2003 American documentary film directed by Ferne Pearlstein, about American participants in the Japanese sport of sumo wrestling. The film had its world premiere at the Tribeca Film Festival in New York City in May 2003 and was broadcast nationally as part of PBS's Independent Lens series on June 8, 2004.

== Synopsis ==
Sumo East and West tells the story of Wayne Vierra of Kahuku, Hawaii, who arrived in Japan in 1990 at the age of 18 to become a professional sumo wrestler alongside another teenaged Hawaiian, Chad Rowan of Waimanalo. The two became fast friends during the arduous apprenticeship as sumo novices but their paths soon diverged, as Wayne suffered a ruptured pancreas that ended his career and sent him back to Hawaii, while Chad—under the name Akebono—went on to become the first non-Japanese yokozuna (grand champion) in the two thousand-year history of sumo. "Sumo East and West" recounts how Wayne recovered from this crushing turn of events to become a star in the burgeoning world of amateur sumo, culminating in winning both the heavyweight and Open categories at the North American Amateur Sumo Championship in Los Angeles in 1999.

Using Wayne's story as its spine, Sumo East and West tells the broader story of the culture clash between East and West seen through the prism of sumo, including sumo's role in Commodore Perry's opening of Japan in 1851; in the influx of Japanese immigrants to Hawaii at the turn of the 19th century; and in the internment of Japanese-Americans during World War II; and in Japan's complex love-hate relationship with American pop culture in the postwar period. A principal focus is the state of sumo today, as the sport fights for relevance in modern Japan, while aficionados in the US are busily transforming it into Westernized form for tournaments in Las Vegas casinos and hoping for its inclusion in the Olympic Games.

In addition to Akebono, the film also features interviews with two other Hawaii-born superstars of pro sumo who were at the forefront of the controversial transformation of the sport: Konishiki and Jesse "Takamiyama" Kuhaulua. Also featured are Emmanuel Yarborough of New Jersey, the 1995 World Amateur Sumo Champion and—at 750 lbs, the largest athlete in the world according to the Guinness Book of World Records; Henry "Sentoryu" Miller of St. Louis, Missouri, the only African-American to reach the top division of pro sumo; and Judge Katsugo Miho of Hawaii, a veteran of the fabled all-nisei 442d Regimental Combat Team who helped liberate the Dachau concentration camp and later negotiated the way for the first Hawaiian wrestlers to enter pro sumo in Japan.

== Cast ==
- Wayne Vierra
- Akebono Tarō
- Jesse Kuhaulua (aka Takamiyama, aka Azumazeki)
- Konishiki Yasokichi
- Emmanuel "Manny" Yarbrough
- Sentoryū Henri
- Katsugo Miho

== Production ==
Sumo East and West was made by the husband-and-wife team Ferne Pearlstein (director/cinematographer/producer/editor) and Robert Edwards (writer/producer/editor). It was filmed in Super 16 mm in Japan, Hawaii, Los Angeles, and Atlantic City, and funded by ITVS, Pacific Islanders in Communications (PIC), the National Asian American Telecommunications Association (NAATA), the Japan-United States Friendship Commission, and the Japan Foundation.

== Release ==
Sumo East and West had its world premiere at the Tribeca Film Festival in New York City in May 2003. It went on to screen at dozens of other film festivals, including the Los Angeles Film Festival, AFI SilverDocs, and the Director's View Film Festival (where it won first prize). In April 2004 it screened for a crowd of 6000 people on Waikiki Beach in Honolulu as part of the Hawaii International Film Festival's "Sunset on the Beach" series.

== Reception ==
- Honolulu Star Bulletin
- Variety
- New York Times
- Austin Chronicle
- The Forward
- Film Threat
- Ka Leo O Hawaii News
- Metroactive
- Adcombat News
