= 1994 World Sambo Championships =

Sambo competitions

In 1993 the world governing body for Sambo(FIAS) split into two organizations, both of which used the same name and logo. The two groups were often referred to as FIAS “East”, under Russian control, and FIAS “West”, under United States and Western European control. This division for control of Sambo created two world championships. The 1994 World Sambo Championships East were held in Novi Sad, Yugoslavia and the 1994 World Sambo Championships West were held in Montreal, Canada.

The Novi Sad championship was the first major international sporting event held in FR Yugoslavia in over two years, following the abolition of the ban of Yugoslavia from the international sporting competitions, imposed by the United Nations in 1992, within the scope of the international sanctions against the Federal Republic of Yugoslavia.

== Medal overview ==
1	Russia	5	1	0	6
2	Ukraine	1	3	2	6
3	Belarus	2	1	1	4
4	Mongolia	1	1	2	4
5	Georgia	0	2	3	2
6	Kazakhstan	0	0	5	2
