= Agvaansamdangiin Sükhbat =

Mongolian wrestler

Agvaansamdangiin Sükhbat Агваансамдангийн Сүхбат
- Born: 30 June 1971 (age 55); Töv, Mongolia
Medal record
Representing Mongolia
Men's Freestyle wrestling
Asian Championships
Silver medal – second place	1995 Manila	82 kg
Bronze medal – third place	1993 Ulaanbaatar	74 kg
Olympic Qualification Tournament
Bronze medal – third place	2000 Tokyo	97 kg
Men's Greco-Roman
East Asian Games
Silver medal – second place	1997 Pusan	85 kg

Agvaansamdangiin Sükhbat (Mongolian: Агваансамдангийн Сүхбат; born 30 June 1971) is a successful Mongolian wrestler with three championship wins (2000, 2001, 2004) and first Mongolian wrestler to officially declare retirement in 2006.

His rank/title, showing respect within the wrestling world, is "Dayar dursagdah, dalai dayan, avraga Sükhbat" literally meaning "Renowned by all, oceanic, titan Sükhbat," essentially the highest rank possible in Mongolian wrestling.

He was also a two times winner (1995, 1997) in the Amateur Sumo World Championships.

== Mongolian wrestling career record ==
Agvaansamdangiin Sükhbat
Year	Level	Participants	Rank	Wins	Earned title	Notes
2014	State	512	State Grand Champion	2	State Grand Champion	Promoted due to legal rule change.
2013	State	512	State Wide Champion			Retired.
2012	State	512	State Wide Champion			Retired.
2011	State	1024	State Wide Champion			Retired.
2010	State	512	State Wide Champion			Retired.
2009	State	512	State Wide Champion			Retired.
2008	State	512	State Wide Champion			Retired.
2007	State	512	State Surge Champion		State Wide Champion	Retroactive promotion in recognition of his performance at the 2001 Naadam festival.
2006	State	1024	State Surge Champion	6	Tsogt Garamgai	
2005	State	512	State Surge Champion	6	Unen Zorigt	
2004	State	512	State Champion	9	State Surge Champion	
2003	State	512	State Champion	7	Ulzii Badrakh	
2002	State	512	State Champion	7	Khuirnan Shuugigch	
2001	State	1024	State Lion	10	State Champion	
2000	State	512	State Elephant	9	State Lion	
1999	State	512	State Elephant	5	Saruul Saijrakh	
1998	State	512	State Elephant	6	Ulemj Badrakh	
1997	State	512	State Falcon	7	State Elephant	
1996	State	512	State Falcon			Sat out.
1995	State	512	State Falcon	3		
1994	State	768	State Falcon	4		
1993	State	512	Lion of Aimag	6	State Falcon	
State Naadam Winner Won at least 5 rounds in State Naadam Aimag/Sum Naadam Promotion
