= Aap Uspenski =

Estonian wrestler and strongman

Aap Uspenski (born 17 July 1966) is an Estonian wrestler and strongman.

He was born in Abja-Paluoja.

He began his wrestling career in 1974, coached by his father. He won medals at World Sumo Championships. He is multiple-times Estonian champion in wrestling and sumo. From 1990 to 1992 he won Estonian strongmen competition (Estonian: Eestimaa Rammumees).
