= Sumo World Championships =

Sumo wrestling championship

The Sumo World Championships is an amateur sumo competition organized by the International Sumo Federation. The men's competition started in 1992 and the women's competition started in 2001, with both competitions having been held together. The competitions are generally held every year, although the 2009 and 2011 events were cancelled due to the 2009 flu pandemic and political unrest over the Arab Spring respectively. The 24th edition, originally scheduled to take place in Russia in 2022, was rescheduled to be held in Tokyo in late 2023.

== Weight classes ==
=== 1992–2018 ===
Weight class	Men	Women	Jr. Men*	Jr. Women*
Open	Unrestricted	Unrestricted	Unrestricted	Unrestricted
Heavyweight	≥115 kg	≥80 kg	≥100 kg	≥75 kg
Middleweight	85−115 kg	65–80 kg	80–100 kg	60–75 kg
Lightweight	<85 kg	<65 kg	<80 kg	<60 kg

* Age restrictions of 13–18 years old apply

=== 2019–present ===
Weight class	Men	Women	Jr. Men*	Jr. Women*
Open	Unrestricted	Unrestricted	Unrestricted	Unrestricted
Heavyweight	≥115 kg	≥80 kg	≥100 kg	≥75 kg
Light Heavyweight	100–115kg	73–80 kg	(Unused)	
Middleweight	85−100 kg	65–73 kg	80–100 kg	60–75 kg
Lightweight	<85 kg	<65 kg	<80 kg	<60 kg

* Age restrictions of 13–18 years old apply

== Lists of medalists ==
=== Men's individual and men's teams ===
SWC Men's all-time medal table (individual & teams)
Country	Gold	Silver	Bronze	Total
Japan	68	18	28	114
Russia	21	15	27	63
Mongolia	17	17	41	75
Ukraine	12	11	23	46
Germany	5	7	9	21
Bulgaria	4	10	16	30
Poland	2	12	22	36
Georgia	2	4	10	16
Hungary	2	4	7	13
United States	1	8	9	18
Brazil	1	6	19	26
Kyrgyzstan	1	2	7	10
Azerbaijan	1	2	3	6
South Africa	1	1	1	3
Finland	0	3	7	10
Egypt	0	3	5	8
Norway	0	2	6	8
Estonia	0	2	5	7
Senegal	0	1	3	4
Canada	0	1	2	3
Argentina	0	1	1	2
Kazakhstan	0	1	1	2
Fiji	0	1	1	2
Chinese Taipei	0	1	1	2
Sweden	0	1	0	1
Thailand	0	1	0	1
New Zealand	0	1	0	1
Czech Republic	0	1	0	1
France	0	0	4	4
United Kingdom	0	0	3	3
Netherlands	0	0	3	3
Australia	0	0	2	2
Cuba	0	0	2	2
Denmark	0	0	1	1
Turkey	0	0	1	1
Colombia	0	0	1	1
Nigeria	0	0	1	1
Uzbekistan	0	0	1	1
Tonga	0	0	1	1

=== Women's individual and women's teams ===
SWC Women's all-time medal table (individual & teams)
Country	Gold	Silver	Bronze	Total
Russia	36	10	17	63
Ukraine	29	17	23	69
Japan	16	17	34	67
Germany	5	4	4	13
Mongolia	3	8	15	26
Poland	3	5	23	31
Norway	1	6	2	9
Brazil	1	2	13	16
Hungary	1	1	12	14
Belarus	1	0	4	5
Bulgaria	0	6	9	15
Netherlands	0	5	7	12
United States	0	5	3	8
Estonia	0	3	2	5
Chinese Taipei	0	2	7	9
Thailand	0	1	8	9
Uzbekistan	0	1	2	3
Italy	0	1	1	2
United Kingdom	0	1	0	1
Canada	0	0	1	1

=== Junior men's individual and junior men's teams ===
SWC Junior Men's all-time medal table (individual & teams)
Country	Gold	Silver	Bronze	Total
Japan	80	13	9	102
Mongolia	4	21	21	46
Poland	4	9	18	31
Russia	4	6	22	32
Georgia	2	10	17	29
Ukraine	1	7	29	37
Egypt	1	5	14	20
Hungary	1	3	4	8
Bulgaria	1	1	4	6
Azerbaijan	1	0	4	5
United States	1	0	1	2
Brazil	0	11	18	29
Estonia	0	5	10	15
Tonga	0	5	7	12
New Zealand	0	2	1	3
Germany	0	1	4	5
Philippines	0	1	0	1
Czech Republic	0	0	5	5
Moldova	0	0	4	4
Kazakhstan	0	0	3	3
Uzbekistan	0	0	2	2
Thailand	0	0	2	2
Chinese Taipei	0	0	2	2
Lithuania	0	0	1	1
Finland	0	0	1	1

== See also ==
- List of World Sumo Championships medalists (men)
- List of World Sumo Championships medalists (women)
- List of World Sumo Championships medalists (junior men)
- List of World Sumo Championships medalists (junior women)
- Sumo at the World Games
- International Sumo Federation
