= Women's sumo =

Form of sumo played by women

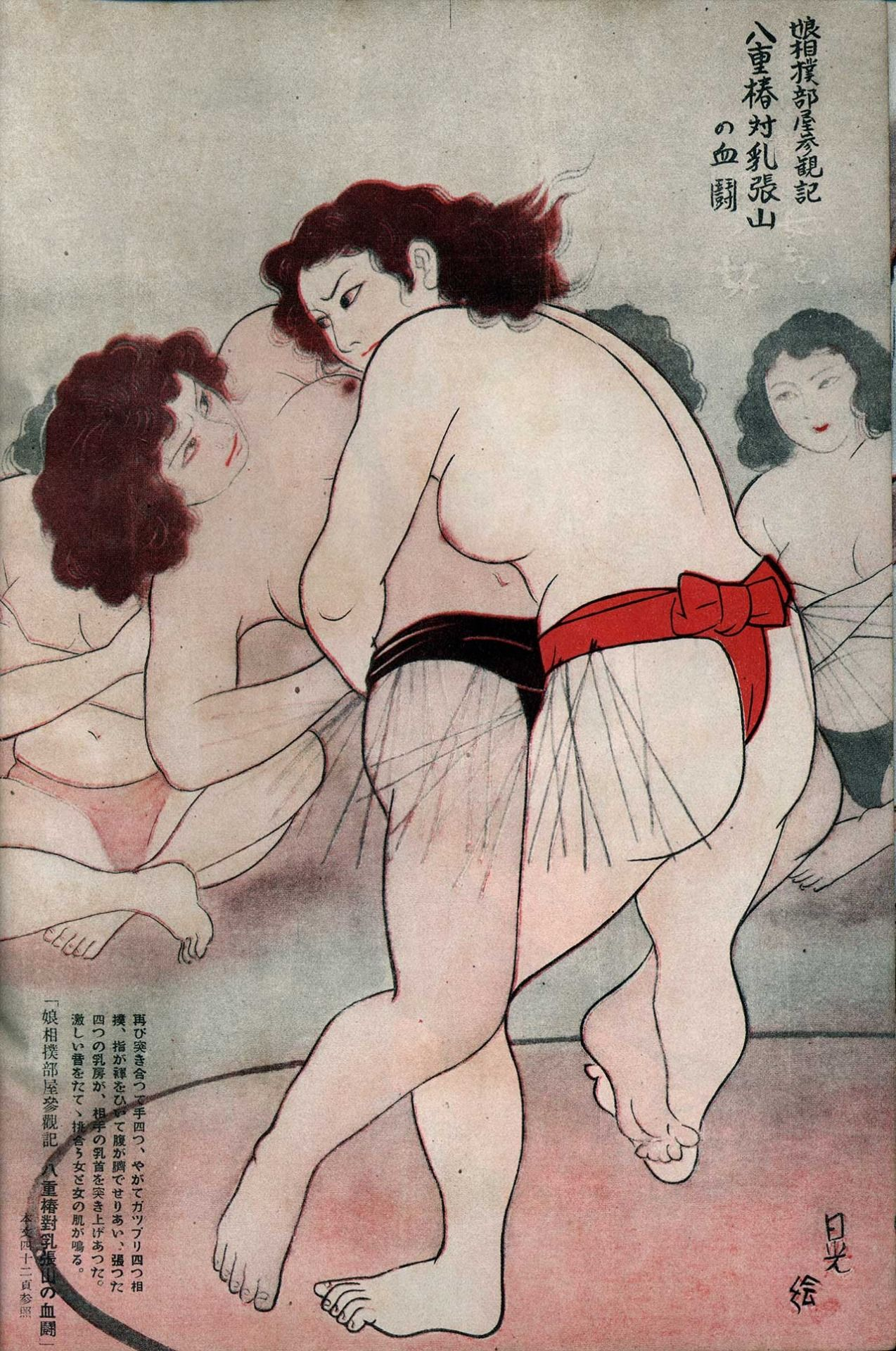
Women sumo wrestling, 1951 work by pseudonymous artist Ko (possibly 須磨利之, Toshiyuki Suma)

Women's sumo (Japanese: 女相撲, Hepburn: onna-zumō) is a form of sumo contested by women.

Professional sumo traditionally forbids women from competition and ceremonies. Women are not allowed to enter or touch the sumo wrestling ring (dohyō), a tradition stemming from Shinto and Buddhist beliefs that women are "impure" because of menstrual blood. Female sumo does exist on an amateur level.

== History ==
The first recorded instance of women performing sumo, according to the Nihon Shoki, is when Emperor Yuryaku (418–479) summoned two courtesans and ordered them to wrestle in only loincloths.

Women's sumo would not become common until the 18th century in the middle of Edo (1603–1868), when a form of onna sumo was performed in some areas of Japan. Women's sumo was mainly a spectacle associated with brothels. Various types of women's sumo existed, including touring "professionals". Women's sumo with blind men were also held. These continued to exist after the Meiji Restoration despite periodic crackdowns by the Tokugawa shogunate and the Meiji government, as they deemed the organizers of it to be corrupting public morals with these spectacles.

Women's sumo continued to exist despite a government ban in 1926. The practice would only die after the end of World War II, with the last group dissolving in 1963.

== Modern times ==
Female sumo is prohibited from taking place in professional settings, but exists on an amateur level.

The first national championship for amateur women's sumo was held in 1997. The rules are the same as men's amateur sumo, except women are permitted to wear a United World Wrestling-style singlet under a mawashi, and their matches last a maximum of three minutes instead of five minutes.

The International Sumo Federation and its events (such as the Sumo World Championships and European Sumo Championships) allow female competitors as of 2001. Women's Sumo is an event at the World Games and was also featured at the 2013 World Combat Games.

The Hakuhō Cup left the Ryōgoku Kokugikan for Toyota Arena Tokyo in Aomi after its leader, Hakuhō, left the Japan Sumo Association and expanded his amateur tournament from boys to having a full amateur tournament for males and females, including adult divisions.

== Notable female sumo wrestlers ==
- Hiyori Kon
- Miki Satoyama
- Sharran Alexander
- Julia Dorny
- Hetal Dave
- Edyta Witkowska
- Seika Izawa
- Epp Mäe
- Anna Zhigalova
- Vera Koval
- Svitlana Iaromka
- Sandra Köppen
- Maryna Pryshchepa
- Yonamine Chiru
- Françoise Harteveld
- Kellyann Ball

== In popular media ==
- The Chrysanthemum and the Guillotine (菊とギロチン, Kiku to girochin) a 2018 Japanese film about women's sumo wrestling in the 1920s.
- On'nazumou (女相撲), a TV drama written by Akira Hayasaka and broadcast in 1991 by TBS Television. It won the 1992 Broadcasting Culture Fund Award Main Award and the 1992 Television ATP Award Excellence Award. Nana Kinomi, who plays the role of Hanamidori Master, won the 18th Broadcasting Culture Fund Award Performance Award.
- Women's Sumo featured as subject of the Season 4 Episode 3 of ''Time Scoop Hunter'', a documentary drama-style historical cultural program broadcast on NHK General TV.
- Women's Sumo is the subject of the manga Rikijo (りきじょ), written and illustrated by Utamaro and published in Gekkan Action between 2013 and 2015.
- In video games, Hinako Shijou from SNK's The King of Fighters series is a female sumo wrestler and one of the limited examples in the medium. She debuted in The King of Fighters 2000 as part of the "Woman Fighters Team".
- In the film Sumo Do, Sumo Don't, a female character pretends to be a male sumo wrestler while another engages with sumo at the end.

== See also ==
- Little Miss Sumo, documentary from 2018.
- Controversies in professional sumo

== Bibliography ==
- Seeing Stars: Sports Celebrity, Identity, and Body Culture in Modern Japan (2010, Dennis J. Frost; ISBN 978-0674056107)
- Japanese Women and Sport: Beyond Baseball and Sumo (2011, Robin Kietlinski; ISBN 978-1849663403)
- Martial Arts of the World: An Encyclopedia of History and Innovation, Volume 2 (2010, Green & Svinth; ISBN 978-1-59884-243-2)
- Women's Sumo Folk Magazine-Cross-border Performing Arts (October 2012, Yoshie Kamei; ISBN 978-4874491423)
- Folk History of Sumo (August 1996, Tomoko Yamada ISBN 978-4487722419)
