= Sumo at the 2009 World Games – Women's openweight =

Sumo – Women's openweight at the 2009 World Games
- Venue: Kaohsiung Senior High School Gymnasium, Kaohsiung, Taiwan
- Dates: 18 July 2009
- Competitors: 47 from 18 nations

Medalists
gold medal	(Russia) Anna Zhigalova
silver medal	(Ukraine) Olga Davydko
bronze medal	(Poland) Edyta Witkowska

The women's openweight competition in sumo at the 2009 World Games took place on 18 July 2009 at the Kaohsiung Senior High School Gymnasium in Kaohsiung, Taiwan.

== Competition format ==
A total of 47 athletes entered the competition. They fought in the cup system with repechages.

== Results ==
=== 1/48 finals ===
	Score	
1/48 Finals
(Russia) Olesya Kovalenko (RUS)		Bye
(Netherlands) Françoise Harteveld (NED)		Bye
(Germany) Nicole Niemeier (GER)		Bye
(Estonia) Epp Mäe (EST)	W-L	(Japan) Asano Matsuura (JPN)
(Hungary) Gyongyi Kallo (HUN)		Bye
(Ukraine) Alina Boykova (UKR)	W-DNS	(Russia) Svetlana Panteleeva (RUS)
(Hong Kong) Mak Ka-po (HKG)		Bye
(Chinese Taipei) Cheng Chiu-jung (TPE)	W-L	(Thailand) Tassama Chalearmthip (THA)
(Estonia) Marta Karpova (EST)		Bye
(Japan) Tamami Iwai (JPN)	W-DNS	(Russia) Anna Alexandrova (RUS)
(Germany) Steffi Muller (GER)		Bye
(Hungary) Erika Makai (HUN)	W-L	(Australia) Stephanie Wong (AUS)
(Russia) Nelli Vorobyeva (RUS)		Bye
(Chinese Taipei) Lien Pei-ju (TPE)	W-L	(Mongolia) Orolzod Bayarsaikhan (MGL)
(Ukraine) Olga Davydko (UKR)		Bye
(Japan) Sayaka Sasaki (JPN)	W-L	(Brazil) Luciana Montgomery Watanabe (BRA)
(Poland) Edyta Witkowska (POL)		Bye
(Thailand) Supawadee Laenglah (THA)	L-W	(Chinese Taipei) Lee Pei-shan (TPE)
(Mongolia) Selengiin Enkhzayaa (MGL)		Bye
(Brazil) Fernanda Rojas Pelegrini (BRA)	L-W	(Japan) Miki Satoyama (JPN)
(Hungary) Viktoria Fabian (HUN)		Bye
(Russia) Marina Dvoretskaya (RUS)	W-L	(Ukraine) Maryna Maksymenko (UKR)
(Japan) Yuka Ueta (JPN)		Bye
(Bulgaria) Anna Metodieva (BUL)	W-L	(Italy) Paola Boz (ITA)
(Russia) Ekaterina Keyb (RUS)		Bye
(Chinese Taipei) Chen Chia-fan (TPE)	W-L	(Australia) Katherine Eber (AUS)
(Estonia) Kairi Kuur (EST)		Bye
(Germany) Nicole Hehemann (GER)	W-DNS	(Ukraine) Maryna Pryshchepa (UKR)
(United States) Lindsay Hood (USA)		Bye
(Japan) Miki Niikawa (JPN)	W-DNS	(India) Hetal Dave (IND)
(Hong Kong) Leung Hoi Man (HKG)		Bye
(Russia) Anna Zhigalova (RUS)	W-L	(Mongolia) Dulmaa Yadmaa (MGL)
1/48 repechages
(Japan) Sayaka Sasaki (JPN)		Bye
(Bulgaria) Anna Metodieva (BUL)		Bye
(Hong Kong) Leung Hoi Man (HKG)	L-W	(Mongolia) Dulmaa Yadmaa (MGL)

=== 1/32 finals ===
	Score	
1/32 Finals
(Russia) Olesya Kovalenko (RUS)	DNS-W	(Netherlands) Françoise Harteveld (NED)
(Germany) Nicole Niemeier (GER)	L-W	(Estonia) Epp Mäe (EST)
(Hungary) Gyongyi Kallo (HUN)	L-W	(Ukraine) Alina Boykova (UKR)
(Hong Kong) Mak Ka-po (HKG)	L-W	(Chinese Taipei) Cheng Chiu-jung (TPE)
(Estonia) Marta Karpova (EST)	L-W	(Japan) Tamami Iwai (JPN)
(Germany) Steffi Muller (GER)	L-W	(Hungary) Erika Makai (HUN)
(Russia) Nelli Vorobyeva (RUS)	W-L	(Chinese Taipei) Lien Pei-ju (TPE)
(Ukraine) Olga Davydko (UKR)	W-L	(Japan) Sayaka Sasaki (JPN)
(Poland) Edyta Witkowska (POL)	W-L	(Chinese Taipei) Lee Pei-shan (TPE)
(Mongolia) Selengiin Enkhzayaa (MGL)	W-L	(Japan) Miki Satoyama (JPN)
(Russia) Marina Dvoretskaya (RUS)	W-DNS	(Hungary) Viktoria Fabian (HUN)
(Japan) Yuka Ueta (JPN)	W-L	(Bulgaria) Anna Metodieva (BUL)
(Russia) Ekaterina Keyb (RUS)	DNS-W	(Chinese Taipei) Chen Chia-fan (TPE)
(Estonia) Kairi Kuur (EST)	DNS-W	(Germany) Nicole Hehemann (GER)
(Japan) Miki Niikawa (JPN)	W-DNS	(United States) Lindsay Hood (USA)
(Hong Kong) Leung Hoi Man (HKG)	L-W	(Russia) Anna Zhigalova (RUS)
1/32 repechages
(Estonia) Epp Mäe (EST)		Bye
(Japan) Miki Niikawa (JPN)	L-W	(Mongolia) Dulmaa Yadmaa (MGL)

=== 1/16 finals ===
	Score	
1/16 Finals
(Netherlands) Françoise Harteveld (NED)	W-L	(Estonia) Epp Mäe (EST)
(Ukraine) Alina Boykova (UKR)	L-W	(Chinese Taipei) Cheng Chiu-jung (TPE)
(Japan) Tamami Iwai (JPN)	L-W	(Hungary) Erika Makai (HUN)
(Russia) Nelli Vorobyeva (RUS)	L-W	(Ukraine) Olga Davydko (UKR)
(Poland) Edyta Witkowska (POL)	W-L	(Mongolia) Selengiin Enkhzayaa (MGL)
(Russia) Marina Dvoretskaya (RUS)	L-W	(Japan) Yuka Ueta (JPN)
(Chinese Taipei) Chen Chia-fan (TPE)	W-L	(Germany) Nicole Hehemann (GER)
(Japan) Miki Niikawa (JPN)	L-W	(Russia) Anna Zhigalova (RUS)
1/16 repechages
(Chinese Taipei) Cheng Chiu-jung (TPE)	W-L	(Estonia) Epp Mäe (EST)
(Hungary) Erika Makai (HUN)	L-W	(Japan) Sayaka Sasaki (JPN)
(Poland) Edyta Witkowska (POL)	W-L	(Russia) Marina Dvoretskaya (RUS)
(Chinese Taipei) Chen Chia-fan (TPE)	L-W	(Mongolia) Dulmaa Yadmaa (MGL)

=== Quarterfinals ===
	Score	
Quarterfinals
(Netherlands) Françoise Harteveld (NED)	W-L	(Chinese Taipei) Cheng Chiu-jung (TPE)
(Hungary) Erika Makai (HUN)	L-W	(Ukraine) Olga Davydko (UKR)
(Poland) Edyta Witkowska (POL)	L-W	(Japan) Yuka Ueta (JPN)
(Chinese Taipei) Chen Chia-fan (TPE)	L-W	(Russia) Anna Zhigalova (RUS)
Quarterfinals repechages
(Chinese Taipei) Cheng Chiu-jung (TPE)	W-L	(Japan) Sayaka Sasaki (JPN)
(Poland) Edyta Witkowska (POL)	W-L	(Mongolia) Dulmaa Yadmaa (MGL)

=== Semifinals ===
	Score	
Semifinals
(Netherlands) Françoise Harteveld (NED)	L-W	(Ukraine) Olga Davydko (UKR)
(Japan) Yuka Ueta (JPN)	L-W	(Russia) Anna Zhigalova (RUS)
Repechages Semifinals
(Chinese Taipei) Cheng Chiu-jung (TPE)	L-W	(Japan) Yuka Ueta (JPN)
(Netherlands) Françoise Harteveld (NED)	L-W	(Poland) Edyta Witkowska (POL)

=== Finals ===
	Score	
Gold medal match
(Ukraine) Olga Davydko (UKR)	L-W	(Russia) Anna Zhigalova (RUS)
Bronze medal match
(Japan) Yuka Ueta (JPN)	L-W	(Poland) Edyta Witkowska (POL)
