= Sumo at the 2009 World Games =

- Venue: Kaohsiung Senior High School Gymnasium
- Dates: 17–18 July 2009
- Competitors: 97 from 21 nations

Sumo was one of the sports at the 2009 World Games in Kaohsiung and was played between 17 and 18 July. 97 athletes, from 21 nations, participated in the tournament. The competition took place at Kaohsiung Senior High School Gymnasium.

== Participating nations ==
- Australia (5)
- Brazil (5)
- Bulgaria (2)
- Chinese Taipei (7)
- Egypt (7)
- Estonia (4)
- Germany (3)
- Hong Kong (2)
- Hungary (4)
- India (1)
- Italy (2)
- Japan (13)
- Mongolia (8)
- Netherlands (2)
- New Zealand (2)
- Norway (1)
- Poland (2)
- Russia (11)
- Thailand (2)
- Ukraine (7)
- United States (7)

== Medal table ==
Rank	Nation	Gold	Silver	Bronze	Total
1	Russia	3	0	3	6
2	Japan	2	2	2	6
3	Ukraine	1	3	1	5
4	Mongolia	1	3	0	4
5	Estonia	1	0	0	1
6	Egypt	0	0	1	1
6	Poland	0	0	1	1
Totals (7 entries)		8	8	8	24

== Events ==
=== Men's events ===
Event	Gold	Silver	Bronze
Lightweight	Nachyn Mongush; Russia	Rentsendorjiin Gantögs; Mongolia	El-Sayed Gabr; Egypt
Middleweight	Ryo Ito; Japan	Katsuo Yoshida; Japan	Kostiantyn Iermakov; Ukraine
Heavyweight	Takashi Himeno; Japan	Gankhuyagiin Naranbat; Mongolia	Alan Karaev; Russia
Openweight	Ulambayaryn Byambajav; Mongolia	Mutoshi Matsunaga; Japan	Takashi Himeno; Japan

=== Women's events ===
Event	Gold	Silver	Bronze
Lightweight	Alina Boykova; Ukraine	Selengiin Enkhzayaa; Mongolia	Nelli Vorobyeva; Russia
Middleweight	Epp Mäe; Estonia	Maryna Pryshchepa; Ukraine	Asano Matsuura; Japan
Heavyweight	Anna Zhigalova; Russia	Olga Davydko; Ukraine	Ekaterina Keyb; Russia
Openweight	Anna Zhigalova; Russia	Olga Davydko; Ukraine	Edyta Witkowska; Poland
