= Mongolia at the 2009 World Games =

- IOC code: MGL
- NOC: Mongolian National Olympic Committee

in Kaohsiung, Taiwan 16 July 2009 – 26 July 2009
- Competitors: 8 in 1 sport
- Medals Ranked 25th: Gold 1 Silver 3 Bronze 0 Total 4

World Games appearances
- 1981; 1985; 1989; 1993; 1997; 2001; 2005; 2009; 2013; 2017; 2022

Mongolia competed at the 2009 World Games in Kaohsiung, Taiwan, from July 16, 2009 to July 26, 2009.

== Medalists ==
Medal	Name	Sport	Event	Date
Gold	Ulambayaryn Byambajav	Sumo	Men's openweight	18 July
Silver	Rentsendorjiin Gantögs	Sumo	Men's lightweight	17 July
Silver	Gankhuyagiin Naranbat	Sumo	Men's heavyweight	17 July
Silver	Selengiin Enkhzayaa	Sumo	Women's lightweight	17 July

== Competitors ==
Sports	Men	Women	Total	Events
Sumo	4	4	8	7
Total	4	4	8	7

== Sumo ==
Mongolia has qualified to the games four man and four woman. Four man and three man entered main competition. Baljinnyam Baterdene, who was in entry list of women's lightweight and openweight events didn't start in the competition.

Athlete	Event	1/48 finals	1/32 finals	1/48 Repechages	1/32 Repechages	1/16 finals	Quarterfinals	1/16 Repechages	Repechages quarterfinals	Semifinals	Repechages semifinals	Final / BM	
Athlete	Event	Opposition Score	Opposition Score	Opposition Score	Opposition Score	Opposition Score	Opposition Score	Opposition Score	Opposition Score	Opposition Score	Opposition Score	Opposition Score	Rank
Rentsendorjiin Gantögs	Men's lightweight	N/A				(Ukraine) Midat Kurbedinov; W	(Norway) Martin Johansen; W	N/A		(Hungary) Sándor Bárdosi; L	(Japan) Takashi Shimako; W	(Egypt) El-Sayed Gabr; W	2nd place, silver medalist(s)
Rentsendorjiin Gantögs	Men's openweight	(New Zealand) Howard Gilbert; W	(Japan) Mutoshi Matsunaga; L	Bye	(United States) Kelly Gneiting; L	did not advance							
Amartuvshin Tumennasan	Men's middleweight	N/A				(Ukraine) Kostiantyn Iermakov; W	(Brazil) Ricardo Tadashi Aoyama; W	N/A		(Japan) Katsuo Yoshida; L	(Egypt) Ramy Ibrahim; L	did not advance	
Amartuvshin Tumennasan	Men's openweight	Bye	(Bulgaria) Petar Stoyanov; L	did not advance									
Ulambayaryn Byambajav	Men's heavyweight	N/A				(Australia) Drew Weeks; W	(Japan) Mutoshi Matsunaga; L	(Egypt) El Sayed El-Azazi; W	(Netherlands) Haitham Al-Sadi; W	N/A	(Russia) Alan Karaev; L	did not advance	
Ulambayaryn Byambajav	Men's openweight	Bye	(Japan) Ginji Kochi; W	N/A		(Chinese Taipei) Tsai Hsien-ming; W	(Japan) Takashi Shimako; W	N/A		(Egypt) El Sayed El-Azazi; W	N/A	(Japan) Mutoshi Matsunaga; W	1st place, gold medalist(s)
Gankhuyagiin Naranbat	Men's heavyweight	N/A				(Egypt) Hany Saleh; W	(Bulgaria) Petar Stoyanov; W	N/A		(Russia) Alan Karaev; W	N/A	(Japan) Takashi Himeno; L	2nd place, silver medalist(s)
Gankhuyagiin Naranbat	Men's openweight	(New Zealand) Andrew Perenara; W	(Ukraine) Midat Kurbedinov; W	N/A		(Japan) Katsuo Yoshida; L	did not advance						
Selengiin Enkhzayaa	Women's lightweight	N/A				(Thailand) Supawadee Laenglah; W	(Australia) Stephanie Wong; W	N/A		(Japan) Tamami Iwai; W	N/A	(Ukraine) Alina Boykova; L	2nd place, silver medalist(s)
Selengiin Enkhzayaa	Women's openweight	Bye	(Japan) Miki Satoyama; W	N/A		(Poland) Edyta Witkowska; L	did not advance						
Orolzod Bayarsaikhan	Women's middleweight	N/A				(Japan) Miki Niikawa; L	did not advance						
Orolzod Bayarsaikhan	Women's openweight	(Chinese Taipei) Lien Pei-ju; L	did not advance										
Dulmaa Yadmaa	Women's middleweight	N/A				(Japan) Asano Matsuura; L	did not advance						
Dulmaa Yadmaa	Women's openweight	(Russia) Anna Zhigalova; L	N/A	(Hong Kong) Leung Hoi Man; W	(Japan) Miki Niikawa; W	N/A		(Chinese Taipei) Chen Chia-fan; W	(Poland) Edyta Witkowska; L	did not advance			
