= Sumo at the 2009 World Games – Men's openweight =

Sumo – Men's openweight at the 2009 World Games
- Venue: Kaohsiung Senior High School Gymnasium, Kaohsiung, Taiwan
- Dates: 18 July 2009
- Competitors: 47 from 16 nations

Medalists
gold medal	(Mongolia) Ulambayaryn Byambajav
silver medal	(Japan) Mutoshi Matsunaga
bronze medal	(Japan) Takashi Himeno

The men's openweight competition in sumo at the 2009 World Games took place on 18 July 2009 at the Kaohsiung Senior High School Gymnasium in Kaohsiung, Taiwan.

== Competition format ==
A total of 47 athletes entered the competition. They fought in the cup system with repechages.

== Results ==
=== 1/48 finals ===
	Score	
1/48 Finals
(Mongolia) Amartuvshin Tumennasan (MGL)		Bye
(Bulgaria) Petar Stoyanov (BUL)		Bye
(Japan) Masaru Tateno (JPN)		Bye
(Ukraine) Vitalii Oliinuk (UKR)	W-L	(Australia) Drew Weeks (AUS)
(United States) Trent Sabo (USA)		Bye
(Japan) Takashi Himeno (JPN)	W-DNS	(Russia) Alan Karaev (RUS)
(Egypt) Hany Saleh (EGY)		Bye
(Chinese Taipei) Wang Huang-wen (TPE)	L-W	(Brazil) Willian Takahiro Higuchi (BRA)
(Japan) Mutoshi Matsunaga (JPN)		Bye
(Mongolia) Rentsendorjiin Gantögs (MGL)	W-L	(New Zealand) Howard Gilbert (NZL)
(Russia) Nachyn Mongush (RUS)		Bye
(United States) Kelly Gneiting (USA)	W-L	(Hungary) Sándor Bárdosi (HUN)
(United States) Dan Kalbfleisch (USA)		Bye
(Australia) John Traill (AUS)	L-W	(Egypt) Hossam Omar (EGY)
(Brazil) Ricardo Tadashi Aoyama (BRA)		Bye
(Chinese Taipei) Chan Chieng-an (TPE)	L-W	(Ukraine) Kostiantyn Iermakov (UKR)
(Brazil) Flavio Tooru Kosaihira (BRA)		Bye
(Egypt) El Sayed El-Azazi (EGY)	W-DNS	(Japan) Ryo Ito (JPN)
(United States) Andrew Freund (USA)		Bye
(Russia) Atsamaz Kaziev (RUS)	W-L	(Estonia) Siim Mäe (EST)
(Japan) Katsuo Yoshida (JPN)		Bye
(United States) Douglas Cochran (USA)	L-W	(Poland) Marcin Rozum (POL)
(Ukraine) Midat Kurbedinov (UKR)		Bye
(Mongolia) Gankhuyagiin Naranbat (MGL)	W-L	(New Zealand) Andrew Perenara (NZL)
(United States) Kena Heffernan (USA)		Bye
(Russia) Alan Bibilov (RUS)	L-W	(Japan) Takashi Shimako (JPN)
(Australia) Blake Stacey (AUS)		Bye
(Norway) Martin Johansen (NOR)	W-DNS	(Egypt) Ramy Ibrahim (EGY)
(Chinese Taipei) Tsai Hsien-ming (TPE)		Bye
(Egypt) El-Sayed Gabr (EGY)	W-L	(Italy) Fausto Gobbi (ITA)
(Mongolia) Ulambayaryn Byambajav (MGL)		Bye
(Japan) Ginji Kochi (JPN)	W-L	(Netherlands) Haitham Al-Sadi (NED)
1/48 repechages
(United States) Trent Sabo (USA)		Bye
(Mongolia) Rentsendorjiin Gantögs (MGL)		Bye
(Brazil) Flavio Tooru Kosaihira (BRA)		Bye
(Japan) Ginji Kochi (JPN)		Bye

=== 1/32 finals ===
	Score	
1/32 Finals
(Mongolia) Amartuvshin Tumennasan (MGL)	L-W	(Bulgaria) Petar Stoyanov (BUL)
(Japan) Masaru Tateno (JPN)	W-L	(Ukraine) Vitalii Oliinuk (UKR)
(United States) Trent Sabo (USA)	L-W	(Japan) Takashi Himeno (JPN)
(Egypt) Hany Saleh (EGY)	W-L	(Brazil) Willian Takahiro Higuchi (BRA)
(Japan) Mutoshi Matsunaga (JPN)	W-L	(Mongolia) Rentsendorjiin Gantögs (MGL)
(Russia) Nachyn Mongush (RUS)	L-W	(United States) Kelly Gneiting (USA)
(United States) Dan Kalbfleisch (USA)	W-L	(Egypt) Hossam Omar (EGY)
(Brazil) Ricardo Tadashi Aoyama (BRA)	L-W	(Ukraine) Kostiantyn Iermakov (UKR)
(Brazil) Flavio Tooru Kosaihira (BRA)	L-W	(Egypt) El Sayed El-Azazi (EGY)
(United States) Andrew Freund (USA)	L-W	(Russia) Atsamaz Kaziev (RUS)
(Japan) Katsuo Yoshida (JPN)	W-L	(Poland) Marcin Rozum (POL)
(Ukraine) Midat Kurbedinov (UKR)	L-W	(Mongolia) Gankhuyagiin Naranbat (MGL)
(United States) Kena Heffernan (USA)	L-W	(Japan) Takashi Shimako (JPN)
(Australia) Blake Stacey (AUS)	L-W	(Norway) Martin Johansen (NOR)
(Chinese Taipei) Tsai Hsien-ming (TPE)	W-L	(Egypt) El-Sayed Gabr (EGY)
(Mongolia) Ulambayaryn Byambajav (MGL)	W-L	(Japan) Ginji Kochi (JPN)
1/32 repechages
(United States) Trent Sabo (USA)		Bye
(United States) Kelly Gneiting (USA)	W-L	(Mongolia) Rentsendorjiin Gantögs (MGL)
(Brazil) Flavio Tooru Kosaihira (BRA)		Bye
(Japan) Ginji Kochi (JPN)	W-L	(Chinese Taipei) Tsai Hsien-ming (TPE)

=== 1/16 finals ===
	Score	
1/16 Finals
(Bulgaria) Petar Stoyanov (BUL)	L-W	(Japan) Masaru Tateno (JPN)
(Japan) Takashi Himeno (JPN)	W-L	(Egypt) Hany Saleh (EGY)
(Japan) Mutoshi Matsunaga (JPN)	W-L	(United States) Kelly Gneiting (USA)
(United States) Dan Kalbfleisch (USA)	L-W	(Ukraine) Kostiantyn Iermakov (UKR)
(Egypt) El Sayed El-Azazi (EGY)	W-L	(Russia) Atsamaz Kaziev (RUS)
(Japan) Katsuo Yoshida (JPN)	W-L	(Mongolia) Gankhuyagiin Naranbat (MGL)
(Japan) Takashi Shimako (JPN)	W-L	(Norway) Martin Johansen (NOR)
(Chinese Taipei) Tsai Hsien-ming (TPE)	L-W	(Mongolia) Ulambayaryn Byambajav (MGL)
1/16 repechages
(Japan) Masaru Tateno (JPN)	W-L	(United States) Trent Sabo (USA)
(Ukraine) Kostiantyn Iermakov (UKR)	W-L	(United States) Kelly Gneiting (USA)
(Japan) Katsuo Yoshida (JPN)	W-L	(Brazil) Flavio Tooru Kosaihira (BRA)
(Japan) Takashi Shimako (JPN)	W-L	(Japan) Ginji Kochi (JPN)

=== Quarterfinals ===
	Score	
Quarterfinals
(Japan) Masaru Tateno (JPN)	L-W	(Japan) Takashi Himeno (JPN)
(Japan) Mutoshi Matsunaga (JPN)	W-L	(Ukraine) Kostiantyn Iermakov (UKR)
(Egypt) El Sayed El-Azazi (EGY)	W-L	(Japan) Katsuo Yoshida (JPN)
(Japan) Takashi Shimako (JPN)	L-W	(Mongolia) Ulambayaryn Byambajav (MGL)
Quarterfinals repechages
(Japan) Masaru Tateno (JPN)	W-L	(Ukraine) Kostiantyn Iermakov (UKR)
(Japan) Katsuo Yoshida (JPN)	W-L	(Japan) Takashi Shimako (JPN)

=== Semifinals ===
	Score	
Semifinals
(Japan) Takashi Himeno (JPN)	L-W	(Japan) Mutoshi Matsunaga (JPN)
(Egypt) El Sayed El-Azazi (EGY)	L-W	(Mongolia) Ulambayaryn Byambajav (MGL)
Repechages Semifinals
(Japan) Masaru Tateno (JPN)	W-L	(Egypt) El Sayed El-Azazi (EGY)
(Japan) Katsuo Yoshida (JPN)	L-W	(Japan) Takashi Himeno (JPN)

=== Finals ===
	Score	
Gold medal match
(Japan) Mutoshi Matsunaga (JPN)	L-W	(Mongolia) Ulambayaryn Byambajav (MGL)
Bronze medal match
(Japan) Masaru Tateno (JPN)	L-W	(Japan) Takashi Himeno (JPN)
