= Sumo at the 2009 World Games – Men's heavyweight =

Sumo – Men's heavyweight at the 2009 World Games
- Venue: Kaohsiung Senior High School Gymnasium, Kaohsiung, Taiwan
- Dates: 17 July 2009
- Competitors: 16 from 11 nations

Medalists
gold medal	(Japan) Takashi Himeno
silver medal	(Mongolia) Gankhuyagiin Naranbat
bronze medal	(Russia) Alan Karaev

The men's heavyweight competition in sumo at the 2009 World Games took place on 17 July 2009 at the Kaohsiung Senior High School Gymnasium in Kaohsiung, Taiwan.

== Competition format ==
A total of 16 athletes entered the competition. They fought in the cup system with repechages.

== Results ==
=== Main draw ===
	Score	
1/16 Finals
(Japan) Masaru Tateno (JPN)	W-L	(United States) Kelly Gneiting (USA)
(Chinese Taipei) Wang Huang-wen (TPE)	L-W	(Russia) Alan Karaev (RUS)
(Mongolia) Gankhuyagiin Naranbat (MGL)	W-L	(Egypt) Hany Saleh (EGY)
(Bulgaria) Petar Stoyanov (BUL)	W-L	(New Zealand) Andrew Perenara (NZL)
(Netherlands) Haitham Al-Sadi (NED)	L-W	(Japan) Takashi Himeno (JPN)
(United States) Dan Kalbfleisch (USA)	L-W	(Brazil) Flavio Tooru Kosaihira (BRA)
(Australia) Drew Weeks (AUS)	L-W	(Mongolia) Ulambayaryn Byambajav (MGL)
(Egypt) El Sayed El-Azazi (EGY)	L-W	(Japan) Mutoshi Matsunaga (JPN)
Quarterfinals
(Japan) Masaru Tateno (JPN)	L-W	(Russia) Alan Karaev (RUS)
(Mongolia) Gankhuyagiin Naranbat (MGL)	W-L	(Bulgaria) Petar Stoyanov (BUL)
(Japan) Takashi Himeno (JPN)	W-L	(Brazil) Flavio Tooru Kosaihira (BRA)
(Mongolia) Ulambayaryn Byambajav (MGL)	L-W	(Japan) Mutoshi Matsunaga (JPN)

=== Repechages ===
	Score	
1/16 Repechages
(Japan) Masaru Tateno (JPN)	W-L	(Chinese Taipei) Wang Huang-wen (TPE)
(Bulgaria) Petar Stoyanov (BUL)	W-L	(Egypt) Hany Saleh (EGY)
(Brazil) Flavio Tooru Kosaihira (BRA)	L-W	(Netherlands) Haitham Al-Sadi (NED)
(Mongolia) Ulambayaryn Byambajav (MGL)	W-L	(Egypt) El Sayed El-Azazi (EGY)
Repechages Quarterfinals
(Japan) Masaru Tateno (JPN)	L-W	(Bulgaria) Petar Stoyanov (BUL)
(Netherlands) Haitham Al-Sadi (NED)	L-W	(Mongolia) Ulambayaryn Byambajav (MGL)

=== Semifinals ===
	Score	
Semifinals
(Russia) Alan Karaev (RUS)	L-W	(Mongolia) Gankhuyagiin Naranbat (MGL)
(Japan) Takashi Himeno (JPN)	W-L	(Japan) Mutoshi Matsunaga (JPN)
Repechages Semifinals
(Russia) Alan Karaev (RUS)	W-L	(Mongolia) Ulambayaryn Byambajav (MGL)
(Japan) Mutoshi Matsunaga (JPN)	L-W	(Bulgaria) Petar Stoyanov (BUL)

=== Finals ===
	Score	
Gold medal match
(Mongolia) Gankhuyagiin Naranbat (MGL)	L-W	(Japan) Takashi Himeno (JPN)
Bronze medal match
(Bulgaria) Petar Stoyanov (BUL)	L-W	(Russia) Alan Karaev (RUS)
