= Sumo at the World Games =

List of Medalists in sumo at the World Games

Sumo was introduced as an official World Games sport at the 2005 World Games in Duisburg. It had previously appeared as an invitational sport at the 2001 World Games in Akita.

Sumo was removed from the World Games program for 2025 due to issues during competition at the 2022 World Games.

== Medal table ==
Rank	Nation	Gold	Silver	Bronze	Total
1	Russia (RUS)	13	10	8	31
2	Japan (JPN)	11	11	10	32
3	Ukraine (UKR)	9	9	6	24
4	Mongolia (MGL)	3	3	4	10
5	Egypt (EGY)	1	2	0	3
6	Germany (GER)	1	0	1	2
7	Estonia (EST)	1	0	0	1
7	Hungary (HUN)	1	0	0	1
9	Brazil (BRA)	0	3	1	4
10	Poland (POL)	0	1	8	9
11	United States (USA)	0	1	0	1
12	Thailand (THA)	0	0	1	1
12	Venezuela (VEN)	0	0	1	1
Totals (13 entries)		40	40	40	120

== Medalists ==
=== Men ===
==== -85 kg (lightweight) ====
Games	Gold	Silver	Bronze
2001 Akita (Demonstration)	Chohei Kimura (JPN)	Peer Schmidt-Düwiger (GER)	Lodoijamtsyn Bat-Erdene (MGL)
2005 Duisburg	Vitaliy Tikhenko (UKR)	Igor Kurinnoy (RUS)	Yuya Hanada (JPN)
2009 Kaohsiung	Sandor Bardosi (HUN)	Nachyn Mongush (RUS)	Gantugs Rentsendorj (MGL)
2013 Cali	Tatsuma Kawaguchi (JPN)	Batyr Altyev (RUS)	Gantugs Rentsendorj (MGL)
2017 Wrocław	Batyr Altyev (RUS)	Trent Sabo (USA)	Pawel Wojda (POL)
2022 Birmingham	Abdelrahman Elsefy (EGY)	Demid Karachenko (UKR)	Sviatoslav Semykras (UKR)

==== -115 kg (middleweight) ====
Games	Gold	Silver	Bronze
2001 Akita (Demonstration)	Seietsu Hikage (JPN)	Altangadasyn Khüchitbaatar (MGL)	David Tsallagov (RUS)
2005 Duisburg	Katsuo Yoshida (JPN)	Seietsu Hikage (JPN)	David Tsallagov (RUS)
2009 Kaohsiung	Ryo Ito (JPN)	Katsuo Yoshida (JPN)	Kostiantyn Iermakov (UKR)
2013 Cali	Oleksandr Gordienko (UKR)	Atsamaz Kaziev (RUS)	Usukhbayar Ochirkhuu (MGL)
2017 Wrocław	Atsamaz Kaziev (RUS)	Misbah Hossam (EGY)	Usukhbayar Ochirkhuu (MGL)
2022 Birmingham	Vazha Daiauri (UKR)	Shion Fujisawa (JPN)	Aron Rozum (POL)

==== +115 kg (heavyweight) ====
Games	Gold	Silver	Bronze
2001 Akita (Demonstration)	Jörg Brümmer (GER)	Jüri Uustalu (EST)	Takahisa Osanai (JPN)
2005 Duisburg	Keisho Shimoda (JPN)	Takayuki Ichihara (JPN)	Robert Paczków (POL)
2009 Kaohsiung	Takashi Himeno (JPN)	Naranbat Gankhuyag (MGL)	Alan Karaev (RUS)
2013 Cali	Alan Karaev (RUS)	Vasiliy Margiev (RUS)	Mutoshi Matsunaga (JPN)
2017 Wrocław	Vasiliy Margiev (RUS)	Ramy Belai (EGY)	Soichiro Kurokawa (JPN)
2022 Birmingham	Hidetora Hanada (JPN)	Daiki Nakamura (JPN)	Rui Junior (BRA)

==== Open ====
Games	Gold	Silver	Bronze
2001 Akita (Demonstration)	Kenichi Yajima (JPN)	Torsten Scheibler (GER)	Jaroslav Poříz (CZE)
2005 Duisburg	Takayuki Ichihara (JPN)	Keisho Shimoda (JPN)	Seietsu Hikage (JPN)
2009 Kaohsiung	Byambajav Ulambayaryn (MGL)	Mutoshi Matsunaga (JPN)	Takashi Himeno (JPN)
2013 Cali	Naranbat Gankhuyag (MGL)	Yevhen Kozliatin (UKR)	Vasiliy Margiev (RUS)
2017 Wrocław	Vasiliy Margiev (RUS)	Batyr Altyev (RUS)	Hayato Miwa (JPN)
2022 Birmingham	Daiki Nakamura (JPN)	Badral Baasandorj (MGL)	Oleksandr Veresiuk (UKR)

=== Women ===
==== -65 kg (lightweight) ====
Games	Gold	Silver	Bronze
2001 Akita (Demonstration)	Astrid Lixenfeld (GER)	Satomi Ishigaya (JPN)	Natalia Bobkina (RUS)
2005 Duisburg	Alina Boykova (UKR)	Yekaterina Salakhova (RUS)	Tamami Iwai (JPN)
2009 Kaohsiung	Alina Boykova (UKR)	Selenge Enkhzaya (MGL)	Nelli Vorobyeva (RUS)
2013 Cali	Yukina Iwamoto (JPN)	Luciana Montgomery Watanabe (BRA)	Vera Koval (RUS)
2017 Wrocław	Svitlana Trosiuk (UKR)	Luciana Montgomery Higuchi (BRA)	Magdalena Macios (POL)
2022 Birmingham	Yuka Okutomi (JPN)	Miku Yamanaka (JPN)	Magdalena Macios (POL)

==== -80 kg (middleweight) ====
Games	Gold	Silver	Bronze
2001 Akita (Demonstration)	Olesya Kovalenko (RUS)	Rie Tsuihiji (JPN)	Sandra Köppen (GER)
2005 Duisburg	Svetlana Panteleyeva (RUS)	Satomi Ishigaya (JPN)	Nicole Hehemann (GER)
2009 Kaohsiung	Epp Mäe (EST)	Maryna Pryshchepa (UKR)	Asano Matsuura (JPN)
2013 Cali	Maryna Pryshchepa (UKR)	Maryna Maksymenko (UKR)	Asano Matsuura (JPN)
2017 Wrocław	Munkhtsetseg Otgon (MGL)	Asano Ota (JPN)	Maryna Maksymenko (UKR)
2022 Birmingham	Sakura Ishii (JPN)	Karyna Kolesnik (UKR)	Monika Skiba (POL)

==== +80 kg (heavyweight) ====
Games	Gold	Silver	Bronze
2001 Akita (Demonstration)	None (Middleweight competed as +65 kg)		
2005 Duisburg	Sandra Köppen (GER)	Olesya Kovalenko (RUS)	Edyta Witkowska (POL)
2009 Kaohsiung	Anna Zhigalova (RUS)	Olga Davydko (UKR)	Yekaterina Keyb (RUS)
2013 Cali	Anna Zhigalova (RUS)	Olesya Kovalenko (RUS)	Maria Alejandra Cedeno Henriquez (VEN)
2017 Wrocław	Anna Poliakova (RUS)	Olga Davydko (RUS)	Viparat Vituteerasan (THA)
2022 Birmingham	Svitlana Yaromka (UKR)	Ivanna Berezovska (UKR)	Airi Hisano (JPN)

==== Open ====
Games	Gold	Silver	Bronze
2001 Akita (Demonstration)	None		
2005 Duisburg	Olesya Kovalenko (RUS)	Edyta Witkowska (POL)	Yekaterina Keyb (RUS)
2009 Kaohsiung	Anna Zhigalova (RUS)	Olga Davydko (UKR)	Edyta Witkowska-Popecka (POL)
2013 Cali	Anna Zhigalova (RUS)	Janaina Fernanda Silva (BRA)	Svitlana Yaromka (UKR)
2017 Wrocław	Anna Poliakova (RUS)	Ivanna Berezovska (UKR)	Olga Davydko (RUS)
2022 Birmingham	Ivanna Berezovska (UKR)	Hiyori Kon (JPN)	Svitlana Yaromka (UKR)
