= Karina Michel Feld =

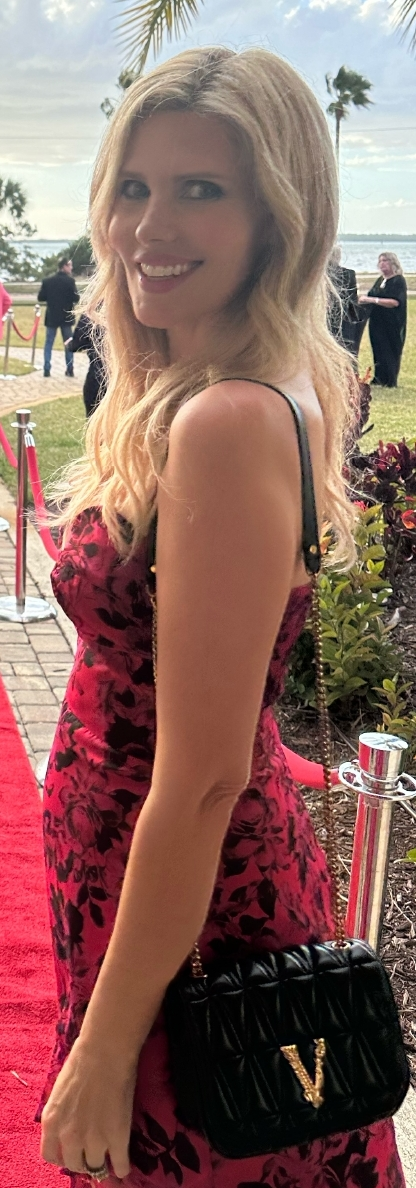
- Born: Bedford, England, United Kingdom
- Occupations: Actress; Film producer; Film director
- Years active: 1999–present
- Organizations: Tallulah Films; Fresh Patch
- Spouse: Andrew Feld (m. 2005)
- Children: 2
- Awards: Suncoast Regional Emmy Award – Heart of Florida: PD (2024)

Karina Michel Feld is a British-American actress, film producer and director. She began her career as a model and actress, with credits including the television series Dexter and the film Transformers: Revenge of the Fallen. In the 2010s, she transitioned to producing and founded the company Tallulah Films. She has produced projects including the documentary short Little Miss Sumo (2018). In 2024, she won a Suncoast Regional Emmy Award for directing the documentary Heart of Florida: PD.

== Early life and education ==
Karina Michel Feld was born in Bedford, England, and moved to the United States at age ten, settling in Ohio. As a teenager, she began a modeling career and at 17 was a finalist in a contest with the Eileen Ford Agency in New York City. After high school, she attended college in Texas for her freshman year. In 1999, she moved to Los Angeles and worked for twelve years as a model and actress. During this period, she became interested in film production.

== Career ==
In 2010, Feld was hired as a producer on The Balancing Act, a morning television show on Lifetime Network. Subsequently, she founded her production company, Tallulah Films. In 2011, she produced a series of short documentary segments for Art Basel and Art Miami TV. She also worked as a casting producer for Demand Media, producing short-form video content.

Feld later moved into independent film production. In 2017, she co-produced the short film Enough, which was selected for the Lady Filmmakers Festival and the California Women’s Film Festival. In the same year, she co-produced the feature documentary The US Festival 1982: The US Generation Documentary, which featured Steve Wozniak, Mick Fleetwood, and Stewart Copeland.

In 2018, Feld was an executive producer on the documentary short Little Miss Sumo. The film won Best UK Film at the 2019 Manchester Film Festival and was featured at the Tribeca Film Festival. She also executive-produced the British short film Queens (2020), which was selected for the Raindance Film Festival, aired on Channel 4, and was nominated for the Iris Prize. In 2021, she was an executive producer for the feature film To the Moon, which won an award for works in progress at the American Film Festival in Poland in 2020.

In 2020, Feld produced two short films addressing mental health: Self-Charm, starring Bukky Bakray, and I Am, directed by Ludovica Musumeci.

In 2020, Feld launched the podcast Coffee with Karina – Entertainment Unfiltered. Additionally, she co-owns the pet products company Fresh Patch with her husband.

== Filmography ==
Feld's producing credits include the documentary Little Miss Sumo (2018) and the short films Enough (2017), Queens (2020), Self-Charm (2022), and I Am (2021). Her documentary work also includes The US Festival 1982: The US Generation (2017) and Heart of Florida: PD (2024). She served as an executive producer on the feature film To the Moon (2021). Her television work includes producing segments for The Balancing Act (2010–2011). Prior to producing, her acting credits included roles in the television series Dexter and the film Transformers: Revenge of the Fallen (2009).

== Personal life ==
Karina married Andrew Feld in 2005 and they have two children.

== Awards and recognition ==
In December 2024, Feld won a Suncoast Regional Emmy Award for Outstanding Production for directing and producing Heart of Florida: PD. The award is administered by the Suncoast Chapter of the National Academy of Television Arts & Sciences.

Other projects she produced have also received honors. Little Miss Sumo won Best UK Film at the Manchester Film Festival in 2019, and To the Moon received an industry prize at a European film festival in 2020. Her podcast has also won multiple awards.
