= Sumo at the 2009 World Games – Men's lightweight =

Sumo – Men's lightweight at the 2009 World Games
- Venue: Kaohsiung Senior High School Gymnasium, Kaohsiung, Taiwan
- Dates: 17 July 2009
- Competitors: 15 from 11 nations

Medalists
gold medal	(Russia) Nachyn Mongush
silver medal	(Mongolia) Rentsendorjiin Gantögs
bronze medal	(Egypt) El-Sayed Gabr

The men's lightweight competition in sumo at the 2009 World Games took place on 17 July 2009 at the Kaohsiung Senior High School Gymnasium in Kaohsiung, Taiwan.

Sándor Bárdosi from Hungary originally won the gold medal, but he was disqualified after he tested positive for drugs. The IWGA has made reallocations of medals in this event.

== Competition format ==
A total of 15 athletes entered the competition. They fought in the cup system with repechages.

== Results ==
=== Main draw ===
	Score	
1/16 Finals
(Egypt) El-Sayed Gabr (EGY)		Bye
(Ukraine) Vitalii Oliinuk (UKR)	W-L	(Chinese Taipei) Chiang Cheng-an (TPE)
(Australia) John Traill (AUS)	L-W	(Russia) Nachyn Mongush (RUS)
(Japan) Takashi Shimako (JPN)	W-L	(United States) Trent Sabo (USA)
(Australia) Blake Stacey (AUS)	L-W	(Norway) Martin Johansen (NOR)
(Mongolia) Rentsendorjiin Gantögs (MGL)	W-L	(Ukraine) Midat Kurbedinov (UKR)
(Japan) Ginji Kochi (JPN)	L-W	~~(Hungary) Sándor Bárdosi (HUN)~~
(United States) Andrew Freund (USA)	L-W	(Estonia) Siim Mäe (EST)
Quarterfinals
(Egypt) El-Sayed Gabr (EGY)	W-L	(Ukraine) Vitalii Oliinuk (UKR)
(Russia) Nachyn Mongush (RUS)	W-L	(Japan) Takashi Shimako (JPN)
(Norway) Martin Johansen (NOR)	L-W	(Mongolia) Rentsendorjiin Gantögs (MGL)
~~(Hungary) Sándor Bárdosi (HUN)~~	W-L	(Estonia) Siim Mäe (EST)

=== Repechages ===
	Score	
1/16 Repechages
(Ukraine) Vitalii Oliinuk (UKR)		Bye
(Japan) Takashi Shimako (JPN)	W-L	(Australia) John Traill (AUS)
(Norway) Martin Johansen (NOR)	L-W	(Ukraine) Midat Kurbedinov (UKR)
(Estonia) Siim Mäe (EST)	L-W	(Japan) Ginji Kochi (JPN)
Repechages Quarterfinals
(Ukraine) Vitalii Oliinuk (UKR)	L-W	(Japan) Takashi Shimako (JPN)
(Ukraine) Midat Kurbedinov (UKR)	L-W	(Japan) Ginji Kochi (JPN)

=== Semifinals ===
	Score	
Semifinals
(Egypt) El-Sayed Gabr (EGY)	L-W	(Russia) Nachyn Mongush (RUS)
(Mongolia) Rentsendorjiin Gantögs (MGL)	L-W	~~(Hungary) Sándor Bárdosi (HUN)~~
Repechages Semifinals
(Egypt) El-Sayed Gabr (EGY)	W-L	(Japan) Ginji Kochi (JPN)
(Mongolia) Rentsendorjiin Gantögs (MGL)	W-L	(Japan) Takashi Shimako (JPN)

=== Finals ===
	Score	
Gold medal match
(Russia) Nachyn Mongush (RUS)	L-W	~~(Hungary) Sándor Bárdosi (HUN)~~
Bronze medal match
(Mongolia) Rentsendorjiin Gantögs (MGL)	W-L	(Egypt) El-Sayed Gabr (EGY)
