= Sumo at the 2009 World Games – Men's middleweight =

Sumo – Men's middleweight at the 2009 World Games
- Venue: Kaohsiung Senior High School Gymnasium, Kaohsiung, Taiwan
- Dates: 17 July 2009
- Competitors: 15 from 11 nations

Medalists
gold medal	(Japan) Ryo Ito
silver medal	(Japan) Katsuo Yoshida
bronze medal	(Ukraine) Kostiantyn Iermakov

The men's middleweight competition in sumo at the 2009 World Games took place on 17 July 2009 at the Kaohsiung Senior High School Gymnasium in Kaohsiung, Taiwan.

== Competition format ==
A total of 15 athletes entered the competition. They fought in the cup system with repechages.

== Results ==
=== Main draw ===
	Score	
1/16 Finals
(Japan) Katsuo Yoshida (JPN)		Bye
(New Zealand) Howard Gilbert (NZL)	L-W	(Egypt) Hossam Omar (EGY)
(Brazil) Ricardo Tadashi Aoyama (BRA)	W-L	(United States) Douglas Cochran (USA)
(Ukraine) Kostiantyn Iermakov (UKR)	L-W	(Mongolia) Amartuvshin Tumennasan (MGL)
(Egypt) Ramy Ibrahim (EGY)	W-L	(Brazil) Willian Takahiro Higuchi (BRA)
(Russia) Atsamaz Kaziev (RUS)	W-L	(Chinese Taipei) Tsai Hsien-ming (TPE)
(Japan) Ryo Ito (JPN)	W-L	(Italy) Fausto Gobbi (ITA)
(United States) Kena Heffernan (USA)	W-L	(Poland) Marcin Rozum (POL)
Quarterfinals
(Japan) Katsuo Yoshida (JPN)	W-L	(Egypt) Hossam Omar (EGY)
(Brazil) Ricardo Tadashi Aoyama (BRA)	L-W	(Mongolia) Amartuvshin Tumennasan (MGL)
(Egypt) Ramy Ibrahim (EGY)	L-W	(Russia) Atsamaz Kaziev (RUS)
(Japan) Ryo Ito (JPN)	W-L	(United States) Kena Heffernan (USA)

=== Repechages ===
	Score	
1/16 Repechages
(Egypt) Hossam Omar (EGY)		Bye
(Brazil) Ricardo Tadashi Aoyama (BRA)	L-W	(Ukraine) Kostiantyn Iermakov (UKR)
(Egypt) Ramy Ibrahim (EGY)	W-L	(Chinese Taipei) Tsai Hsien-ming (TPE)
(United States) Kena Heffernan (USA)	W-L	(Italy) Fausto Gobbi (ITA)
Repechages Quarterfinals
(Egypt) Hossam Omar (EGY)	L-W	(Ukraine) Kostiantyn Iermakov (UKR)
(Egypt) Ramy Ibrahim (EGY)	W-L	(United States) Kena Heffernan (USA)

=== Semifinals ===
	Score	
Semifinals
(Japan) Katsuo Yoshida (JPN)	W-L	(Mongolia) Amartuvshin Tumennasan (MGL)
(Russia) Atsamaz Kaziev (RUS)	L-W	(Japan) Ryo Ito (JPN)
Repechages Semifinals
(Mongolia) Amartuvshin Tumennasan (MGL)	L-W	(Egypt) Ramy Ibrahim (EGY)
(Russia) Atsamaz Kaziev (RUS)	L-W	(Ukraine) Kostiantyn Iermakov (UKR)

=== Finals ===
	Score	
Gold medal match
(Japan) Katsuo Yoshida (JPN)	L-W	(Japan) Ryo Ito (JPN)
Bronze medal match
(Ukraine) Kostiantyn Iermakov (UKR)	W-L	(Egypt) Ramy Ibrahim (EGY)
