= 2000 World Wrestling Championships – Women's freestyle 75 kg =

Women's freestyle 75 kg at the 2000 World Championships
- Venue: Universiada Hall
- Dates: 1–3 September 2000
- Competitors: 15 from 15 nations

Medalists
gold medal	Christine Nordhagen	Canada
silver medal	Edyta Witkowska	Poland
bronze medal	Kyoko Hamaguchi	Japan

The women's freestyle 75 kilograms is a competition featured at the 2000 World Wrestling Championships, and was held at the Universiada Hall in Sofia, Bulgaria from 1 to 3 September 2000.

== Results ==
Legend

- F — Won by fall

=== Preliminary round ===
==== Pool 1 ====
Pos	Athlete	Pld	W	L	CP	TP	POL	USA	TUR
1	Edyta Witkowska (POL)	2	2	0	7	8	—	5–0 Fall	3–1
2	Iris Smith (USA)	2	1	1	4	10	0–4 TO	—	10–0
3	Zarife Yıldırım (TUR)	2	0	2	1	1	1–3 PP	0–4 ST	—

Source: Japan Wrestling

==== Pool 2 ====
Pos	Athlete	Pld	W	L	CP	TP	GER	FIN	ESA
1	Nina Englich (GER)	2	2	0	8	14	—	10–0	4–0 Fall
2	Heidi Martti (FIN)	2	1	1	4	8	0–4 ST	—	8–0 Fall
3	Marcela Carías (ESA)	2	0	2	0	0	0–4 TO	0–4 TO	—

Source: Japan Wrestling

==== Pool 3 ====
Pos	Athlete	Pld	W	L	CP	TP	CZE	BUL	ESP
1	Kateřina Halová (CZE)	2	2	0	6	10	—	6–2	4–0
2	Elisaveta Toleva (BUL)	2	1	1	4	8	1–3 PP	—	6–3
3	Maider Unda (ESP)	2	0	2	1	3	0–3 PO	1–3 PP	—

Source: Japan Wrestling

==== Pool 4 ====
Pos	Athlete	Pld	W	L	CP	TP	CAN	TPE	VEN
1	Christine Nordhagen (CAN)	2	2	0	8	16	—	6–0 Fall	10–0
2	Wang Jo-mei (TPE)	2	1	1	4	6	0–4 TO	—	6–2 Fall
3	Ana Hernández (VEN)	2	0	2	0	2	0–4 ST	0–4 TO	—

Source: Japan Wrestling

==== Pool 5 ====
Pos	Athlete	Pld	W	L	CP	TP	JPN	RUS	UKR
1	Kyoko Hamaguchi (JPN)	2	2	0	7	14	—	5–1	9–0 Fall
2	Zumrud Gurbanhajiyeva (RUS)	2	1	1	4	14	1–3 PP	—	13–7
3	Tetyana Komarnytskaya (UKR)	2	0	2	1	7	0–4 TO	1–3 PP	—

Source: Japan Wrestling

=== Knockout round ===
Quarterfinals
Edyta Witkowska (POL)	3
Nina Englich (GER)	0

Semifinals
Edyta Witkowska (POL)	4^{F}
Kateřina Halová (CZE)	0
Christine Nordhagen (CAN)	9
Kyoko Hamaguchi (JPN)	4

Final
Edyta Witkowska (POL)	2
Christine Nordhagen (CAN)	6
Bronze medal match
Kateřina Halová (CZE)	0
Kyoko Hamaguchi (JPN)	4^{F}
