= Finswimming at the 2009 World Games – Men's 400 m surface =

International sporting event in Kaohsiung, Taiwan

Finswimming – men's 400 m surface at the 2009 World Games
- Venue: Kaohsiung Swimming Pool
- Location: Kaohsiung, Taiwan
- Date: 23 July 2009
- Competitors: 15 from 10 nations

Medalists
gold medal	(Italy) Stefano Figini
silver medal	(Germany) Sven Lutzkendorf
bronze medal	(Hungary) Denes Kanyo

The men's 400 m surface competition in finswimming at the 2009 World Games took place on 23 July 2009 at the Kaohsiung Swimming Pool in Kaohsiung, Taiwan.

== Competition format ==
A total of 15 athletes entered the competition. The best eight athletes from preliminary round qualifies to the final.

== Results ==
=== Preliminary ===
Rank	Athlete	Nation	Time	Note
1	Denys Grubnik	Ukraine	3:05.35	Q
2	Sven Lutzkendorf	Germany	3:06.69	Q
3	Denes Kanyo	Hungary	3:06.80	Q
4	Stefano Figini	Italy	3:06.81	Q
5	Roman Maletin	Russia	3:08.09	Q
6	Yoon Young-joong	South Korea	3:09.33	Q
7	You Gyeong-heon	South Korea	3:10.34	Q
8	Patrik Ščasný	Slovakia	3:12.23	Q
9	Yang Ping-hua	Chinese Taipei	3:12.74	
10	El Hassan Ghonim	Egypt	3:14.28	
11	Florian Ziegler	Germany	3:15.08	
12	Mohsen Abou Mosallem	Egypt	3:22.23	
13	Jian Ka	China	3:26.60	
14	Viktor Panov	Ukraine	3:26.74	
	Andrea Nava	Italy	DNS	

=== Final ===
Rank	Athlete	Nation	Time	Note
1st place, gold medalist(s)	Stefano Figini	Italy	2:58.64	WR
2nd place, silver medalist(s)	Sven Lutzkendorf	Germany	3:01.57	
3rd place, bronze medalist(s)	Denes Kanyo	Hungary	3:01.76	
4	Denys Grubnik	Ukraine	3:04.09	
5	Roman Maletin	Russia	3:05.34	
6	Yoon Young-joong	South Korea	3:07.17	
7	Patrik Ščasný	Slovakia	3:11.81	
8	You Gyeong-heon	South Korea	3:12.54	
