= Sumo at the 2009 World Games – Women's middleweight =

Sumo – Women's middleweight at the 2009 World Games
- Venue: Kaohsiung Senior High School Gymnasium, Kaohsiung, Taiwan
- Dates: 17 July 2009
- Competitors: 16 from 11 nations

Medalists
gold medal	(Estonia) Epp Mäe
silver medal	(Ukraine) Maryna Pryshchepa
bronze medal	(Japan) Asano Matsuura

The women's middleweight competition in sumo at the 2009 World Games took place on 17 July 2009 at the Kaohsiung Senior High School Gymnasium in Kaohsiung, Taiwan.

== Competition format ==
A total of 16 athletes entered the competition. They fought in the cup system with repechages.

== Results ==
=== Main draw ===
	Score	
1/16 Finals
(Russia) Svetlana Panteleeva (RUS)	L-W	(Ukraine) Maryna Maksymenko (UKR)
(Japan) Asano Matsuura (JPN)	W-L	(Mongolia) Dulmaa Yadmaa (MGL)
(Estonia) Epp Mäe (EST)	W-L	(Thailand) Tassama Chalearmthip (THA)
(Hong Kong) Leung Hoi Man (HKG)	W-L	(Russia) Marina Dvoretskaya (RUS)
(Germany) Nicole Hehemann (GER)	L-W	(Russia) Anna Alexandrova (RUS)
(Ukraine) Maryna Pryshchepa (UKR)	W-L	(Brazil) Fernanda Rojas Pelegrini (BRA)
(Chinese Taipei) Chen Chia-fan (TPE)	W-L	(India) Hetal Dave (IND)
(Mongolia) Orolzod Bayarsaikhan (MGL)	L-W	(Japan) Miki Niikawa (JPN)
Quarterfinals
(Ukraine) Maryna Maksymenko (UKR)	W-L	(Japan) Asano Matsuura (JPN)
(Estonia) Epp Mäe (EST)	W-L	(Hong Kong) Leung Hoi Man (HKG)
(Russia) Anna Alexandrova (RUS)	L-W	(Ukraine) Maryna Pryshchepa (UKR)
(Chinese Taipei) Chen Chia-fan (TPE)	W-L	(Japan) Miki Niikawa (JPN)

=== Repechages ===
	Score	
1/16 Repechages
(Russia) Svetlana Panteleeva (RUS)	L-W	(Japan) Asano Matsuura (JPN)
(Thailand) Tassama Chalearmthip (THA)	W-L	(Hong Kong) Leung Hoi Man (HKG)
(Russia) Anna Alexandrova (RUS)	W-L	(Brazil) Fernanda Rojas Pelegrini (BRA)
(India) Hetal Dave (IND)	L-W	(Japan) Miki Niikawa (JPN)
Repechages Quarterfinals
(Japan) Asano Matsuura (JPN)	W-L	(Thailand) Tassama Chalearmthip (THA)
(Russia) Anna Alexandrova (RUS)	W-L	(Japan) Miki Niikawa (JPN)

=== Semifinals ===
	Score	
Semifinals
(Ukraine) Maryna Maksymenko (UKR)	L-W	(Estonia) Epp Mäe (EST)
(Ukraine) Maryna Pryshchepa (UKR)	W-L	(Chinese Taipei) Chen Chia-fan (TPE)
Repechages Semifinals
(Ukraine) Maryna Maksymenko (UKR)	L-W	(Russia) Anna Alexandrova (RUS)
(Chinese Taipei) Chen Chia-fan (TPE)	L-W	(Japan) Asano Matsuura (JPN)

=== Finals ===
	Score	
Gold medal match
(Estonia) Epp Mäe (EST)	W-L	(Ukraine) Maryna Pryshchepa (UKR)
Bronze medal match
(Russia) Anna Alexandrova (RUS)	L-W	(Japan) Asano Matsuura (JPN)
