= 1998 World Wrestling Championships – Women's freestyle 75 kg =

Women's freestyle 75 kg at the 1998 World Championships
- Venue: Hala Arena
- Dates: 8–10 October 1998
- Competitors: 10 from 10 nations

Medalists
gold medal	Kyoko Hamaguchi	Japan
silver medal	Kristie Stenglein	United States
bronze medal	Edyta Witkowska	Poland

The women's freestyle 75 kilograms is a competition featured at the 1998 World Wrestling Championships, and was held in Poznań, Poland from 8 to 10 October 1998.

== Results ==
=== Round 1 ===
	Score	
Round of 16
Kyoko Hamaguchi (JPN)	4–0 Fall	Franziska Lacher (SUI)
Zumrud Gurbanhajiyeva (RUS)	11–0	Zanda Rūtenberga (LAT)
Elvira Barriga (AUT)	3–0	Tamara Medwidsky (CAN)
Věra Bažantová (CZE)	0–10	Kristie Stenglein (USA)
Nina Englich (GER)	4–1	Edyta Witkowska (POL)

=== Round 2 ===
	Score	
Quarterfinals
Kyoko Hamaguchi (JPN)	6–0 Fall	Zumrud Gurbanhajiyeva (RUS)
Elvira Barriga (AUT)		Bye
Kristie Stenglein (USA)		Bye
Nina Englich (GER)		Bye
Repechage
Franziska Lacher (SUI)	5–3 Fall	Zanda Rūtenberga (LAT)
Tamara Medwidsky (CAN)	4–0 Fall	Věra Bažantová (CZE)
Edyta Witkowska (POL)		Bye

=== Round 3 ===
	Score	
Semifinals
Kyoko Hamaguchi (JPN)	4–0 Fall	Elvira Barriga (AUT)
Kristie Stenglein (USA)	5–1	Nina Englich (GER)
Repechage
Edyta Witkowska (POL)	8–0	Franziska Lacher (SUI)
Tamara Medwidsky (CAN)	2–3	Zumrud Gurbanhajiyeva (RUS)

=== Round 4 ===
	Score	
Repechage
Elvira Barriga (AUT)	0–3	Edyta Witkowska (POL)
Zumrud Gurbanhajiyeva (RUS)	3–4	Nina Englich (GER)

=== Finals ===
	Score	
Bronze medal match
Edyta Witkowska (POL)	4–0	Nina Englich (GER)
Final
Kyoko Hamaguchi (JPN)	5–3	Kristie Stenglein (USA)
