= 2001 World Wrestling Championships – Women's freestyle 75 kg =

Women's freestyle 75 kg at the 2001 World Championships
- Venue: Winter Sports Palace
- Dates: 23–25 November 2001
- Competitors: 13 from 13 nations

Medalists
gold medal	Edyta Witkowska	Poland
silver medal	Ma Bailing	China
bronze medal	Nina Englich	Germany

The women's freestyle 75 kilograms is a competition featured at the 2001 World Wrestling Championships, and was held at the Winter Sports Palace in Sofia, Bulgaria from 23 to 25 November 2001.

== Results ==
Legend

- F — Won by fall

=== Preliminary round ===
==== Pool 1 ====
Pos	Athlete	Pld	W	L	CP	TP	CHN	KOR	BUL
1	Ma Bailing (CHN)	2	2	0	7	22	—	10–3	12–2
2	Kang Min-jeong (KOR)	2	1	1	5	8	1–3 PP	—	5–1 Fall
3	Galina Ivanova (BUL)	2	0	2	1	3	1–4 SP	0–4 TO	—

Source: USA Wrestling

==== Pool 2 ====
Pos	Athlete	Pld	W	L	CP	TP	GER	RUS	CAN
1	Nina Englich (GER)	2	2	0	7	7	—	2–2	5–1 Fall
2	Zumrud Gurbanhajiyeva (RUS)	2	1	1	4	8	1–3 PP	—	6–4
3	Ohenewa Akuffo (CAN)	2	0	2	1	5	0–4 TO	1–3 PP	—

Source: USA Wrestling

==== Pool 3 ====
Pos	Athlete	Pld	W	L	CP	TP	JPN	UKR	CZE
1	Kyoko Hamaguchi (JPN)	2	2	0	8	14	—	7–3 Fall	7–0 Fall
2	Tetyana Komarnytskaya (UKR)	2	1	1	4	8	0–4 TO	—	5–2 Fall
3	Kateřina Halová (CZE)	2	0	2	0	2	0–4 TO	0–4 TO	—

Source: USA Wrestling

==== Pool 4 ====
Pos	Athlete	Pld	W	L	CP	TP	POL	USA	VEN	BRA
1	Edyta Witkowska (POL)	3	3	0	11	19	—	5–0	5–0 Fall	9–0 Fall
2	Jenna Pavlik (USA)	3	2	1	8	6	0–3 PO	—	2–2 Fall	4–0 Fall
3	Yasmily Ramos (VEN)	3	1	2	4	7	0–4 TO	0–4 TO	—	5–0 Fall
4	Fátima de Camargo (BRA)	3	0	3	0	0	0–4 TO	0–4 TO	0–4 TO	—

Source: USA Wrestling

=== Knockout round ===
Semifinals
Ma Bailing (CHN)	3
Nina Englich (GER)	2
Kyoko Hamaguchi (JPN)	1
Edyta Witkowska (POL)	3

Final
Ma Bailing (CHN)	0
Edyta Witkowska (POL)	6
Bronze medal match
Nina Englich (GER)	4^{F}
Kyoko Hamaguchi (JPN)	0
