= Sharran Alexander =

Sumo wrestler

Personal information
- Born: 1965 (age 60–61) Maida Vale, London, England, UK
- Height: 1.8288 m (6 ft 0 in)
- Weight: 212.735 kg (469.00 lb)

Sport
- Sport: Sumo
- Updated on 4/27/2018

Sharran Alexander (born 1965 in Maida Vale, London), is a sumo wrestler who is listed in British Sumo Federation as 2nd Kyu grade. She was named as the heaviest sportswoman in the 2013 Guinness World Records at 203.2 kg (448 lb).

== Background ==
Alexander is a child minder by profession. She first joined the British Sumo team for a Channel 4 television show called Strictly Lady Sumo to find four women to compete in the world Championships, signed up by her children. She began competing in Sumo competitions in 2006 at the age of 41.

== Career ==
Alexander is one of the few women recognized by the British Sumo Federation and has won four gold medals in international competitions. In 2006 Alexander competed in 25 different competitions and went to Japan to represent Great Britain in the World Sumo Championship. Since then, she has competed in international tournaments such as the US Sumo Open in 2013, where she was defeated by the 175-pound(kg?) Liz Seward in the final open weight match.

Sharran Alexander also starred in the first series of the TV series Brassic.

== Family ==
Alexander is divorced, and has three children.

== See also ==
- Women's sumo
