= Sumo at the 2009 World Games – Women's lightweight =

Sumo – Women's lightweight at the 2009 World Games
- Venue: Kaohsiung Municipal Kaohsiung Senior High School Gymnasium, Kaohsiung, Taiwan
- Dates: 17 July 2009
- Competitors: 15 from 14 nations

Medalists
gold medal	(Ukraine) Alina Boykova
silver medal	(Mongolia) Selengiin Enkhzayaa
bronze medal	(Russia) Nelli Vorobyeva

The women's lightweight competition in sumo at the 2009 World Games took place on 17 July 2009 at the Kaohsiung Municipal Kaohsiung Senior High School Gymnasium in Kaohsiung, Taiwan.

== Competition format ==
A total of 15 athletes entered the competition. They fought in the cup system with repechages.

== Results ==
=== Main draw ===
	Score	
1/16 Finals
(Ukraine) Alina Boykova (UKR)		Bye
(Germany) Nicole Niemeier (GER)	W-L	(Estonia) Marta Karpova (EST)
(Russia) Nelli Vorobyeva (RUS)	W-L	(Bulgaria) Anna Metodieva (BUL)
(Hungary) Viktoria Fabian (HUN)	L-W	(Chinese Taipei) Lien Pei-ju (TPE)
(Italy) Paola Boz (ITA)	L-W	(Japan) Tamami Iwai (JPN)
(Germany) Steffi Muller (GER)	L-W	(Brazil) Luciana Montgomery Watanabe (BRA)
(Hong Kong) Mak Ka-po (HKG)	L-W	(Australia) Stephanie Wong (AUS)
(Thailand) Supawadee Laenglah (THA)	L-W	(Mongolia) Selengiin Enkhzayaa (MGL)
Quarterfinals
(Ukraine) Alina Boykova (UKR)	W-L	(Germany) Nicole Niemeier (GER)
(Russia) Nelli Vorobyeva (RUS)	W-L	(Chinese Taipei) Lien Pei-ju (TPE)
(Japan) Tamami Iwai (JPN)	W-L	(Brazil) Luciana Montgomery Watanabe (BRA)
(Australia) Stephanie Wong (AUS)	L-W	(Mongolia) Selengiin Enkhzayaa (MGL)

=== Repechages ===
	Score	
1/16 Repechages
(Germany) Nicole Niemeier (GER)		Bye
(Bulgaria) Anna Metodieva (BUL)	W-L	(Chinese Taipei) Lien Pei-ju (TPE)
(Italy) Paola Boz (ITA)	L-W	(Brazil) Luciana Montgomery Watanabe (BRA)
(Australia) Stephanie Wong (AUS)	L-W	(Thailand) Supawadee Laenglah (THA)
Repechages Quarterfinals
(Germany) Nicole Niemeier (GER)	W-L	(Bulgaria) Anna Metodieva (BUL)
(Brazil) Luciana Montgomery Watanabe (BRA)	W-L	(Thailand) Supawadee Laenglah (THA)

=== Semifinals ===
	Score	
Semifinals
(Ukraine) Alina Boykova (UKR)	W-L	(Russia) Nelli Vorobyeva (RUS)
(Japan) Tamami Iwai (JPN)	L-W	(Mongolia) Selengiin Enkhzayaa (MGL)
Repechages Semifinals
(Russia) Nelli Vorobyeva (RUS)	W-L	(Brazil) Luciana Montgomery Watanabe (BRA)
(Japan) Tamami Iwai (JPN)	L-W	(Germany) Nicole Niemeier (GER)

=== Finals ===
	Score	
Gold medal match
(Ukraine) Alina Boykova (UKR)	W-L	(Mongolia) Selengiin Enkhzayaa (MGL)
Bronze medal match
(Germany) Nicole Niemeier (GER)	L-W	(Russia) Nelli Vorobyeva (RUS)
