= Ura Kazuki =

Japanese sumo wrestler (born 1992)

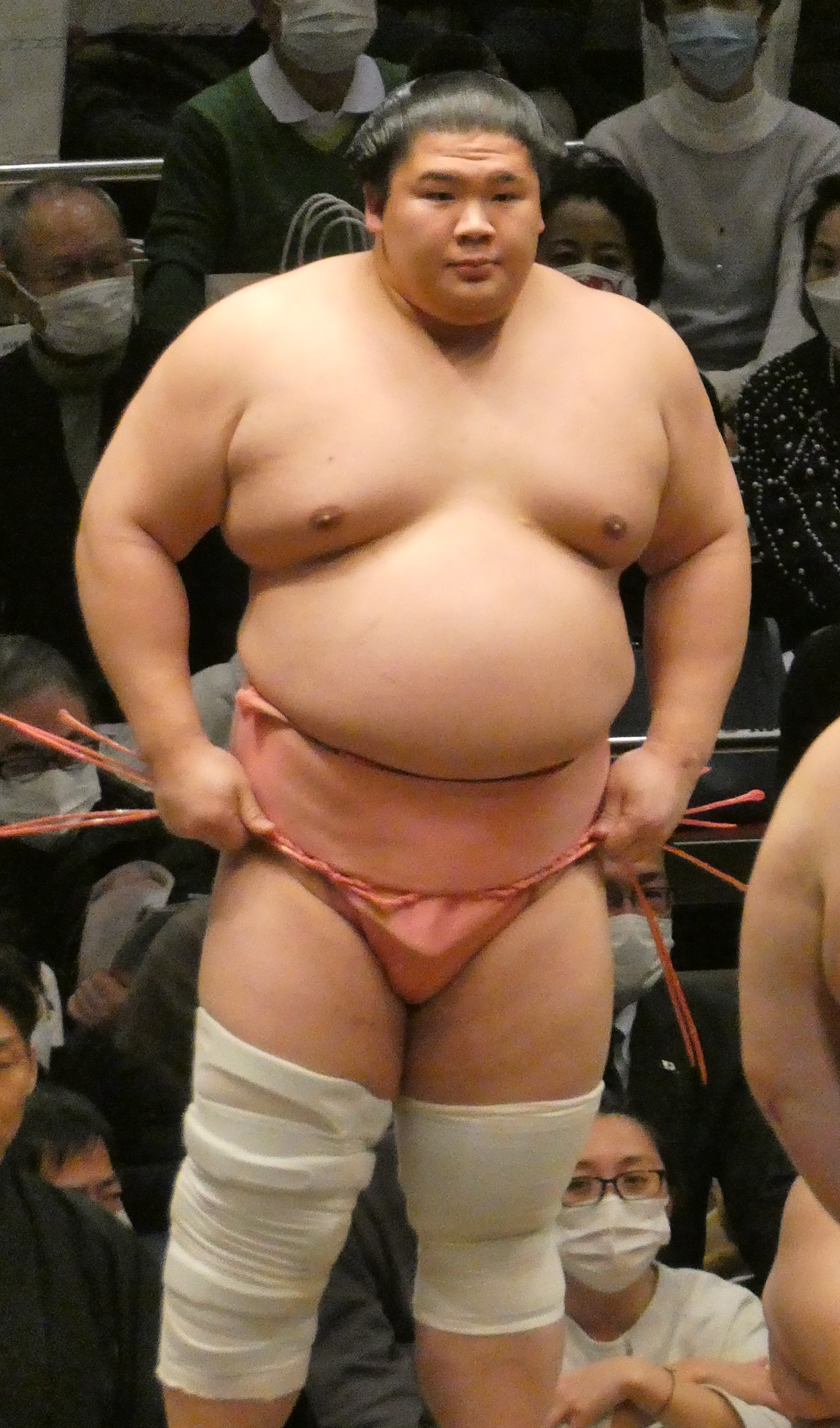

Personal information
- Native name: 宇良 和輝
- Born: Kazuki Ura; 22 June 1992 (age 34) Neyagawa, Osaka, Japan
- Height: 1.73 m (5 ft 8 in)
- Weight: 138 kg (304 lb; 21.7 st)

Sport
- Sport: Sumo
- Rank: see below
- University team: Kwansei Gakuin University
- Heya: Kise
- Debut: March 2015
- Highest rank: Komusubi (January 2024)
- Championships: 1 Juryo; 2 Sandanme; 1 Jonidan; 1 Jonokuchi
- Special Prizes: 1 Technique
- Gold Stars: (3); Harumafuji; Terunofuji; Hōshōryū
- Updated on November 11, 2026

Medal record

Men's Sumo

Representing Japan

World Combat Games
Gold medal – first place	2013 St. Petersburg	Lightweight

Ura Kazuki (Japanese: 宇良 和輝; born 22 June 1992) is a Japanese professional sumo wrestler from Neyagawa, Osaka. After winning a gold medal in sumo at the 2013 World Combat Games, he made his professional debut in 2015, wrestling with the Kise stable and he won the jonokuchi division championship in his first tournament. He reached the top makuuchi division in March 2017, but a pair of serious injuries led to two extended layoffs, and his rank dropped to the lowest since his debut tournament, and it was three and a half years before he returned to top-level competition. He has three kinboshi, or gold stars, for defeating a yokozuna-ranked opponent as a maegashira.

Ura's highest rank has been komusubi, which he achieved in January 2024. His unpredictable style and willingness to use rare kimarite have made him a favourite with tournament crowds.

== Amateur career ==
While attending the School of Education, Kwansei Gakuin University, Ura was a member of the sumo club. He competed in sumo at the 2013 World Combat Games at Saint Petersburg, Russia, winning a gold medal in the lightweight division.

== Professional career ==
=== Debut and early success ===
In February 2015, he announced his intention to enter the Kise stable as a professional sumo wrestler, and after his first bouts in March, made his tournament debut in the May tournament, winning the jonokuchi division. He again performed well in the July tournament, posting a 7–0 record and losing a playoff for the jonidan division championship. After going 5–2 in the sandanme division in September, he finished the year with a 7–0 record as a makushita debutante, again losing a division championship playoff in November.

Ura began 2016 with a 6–1 record and another makushita playoff loss in January. Also going 6–1 in March, he was promoted to jūryō for the next tournament. In recognition of becoming the first among their alumni to achieve sekitori (the two highest divisions in sumo) rank, he was given a keshō-mawashi by Kwansei Gakuin University. He finished the May tournament 10–5 and with a 11–4 finish in the July tournament, he entered the September event as the top-ranked jūryō, but he went 6–9, his first losing record, having fractured a bone in his left wrist that required post-tournament surgery. On his return, he posted a 8–7 record in the November tournament.

His overall 11–4 record in the January 2017 tournament led to his promotion to the top makuuchi division and a rank of maegashira 12. In March 2017, before a home crowd in Osaka, he achieved a winning record (kachi-koshi) of 8–7, and entered the May 2017 tournament at maegashira 10. There he scored eleven wins against four losses in this tournament, but did not receive a special prize for his efforts, despite speculation that he would win the Technique Award. Former yokozuna Kitanofuji, commentating for NHK, expressed his surprise at the omission. Still, his performance earned him a career-high ranking of maegashira 4 for the July 2017 tournament. There he got off to a 5–1 start, but then injuries among those ranked above him shifted him to a more challenging schedule, facing the san'yaku, the foremost wrestlers, for the first time. Though he defeated Harumafuji on Day 9 to earn his first kinboshi or gold star for a win over a yokozuna, he injured his knee in a defeat to ozeki Takayasu on the following day, and he lost four of his remaining five matches to finish with a make-koshi 7–8 record.

=== Injury problems and returns ===
Ura withdrew from the summer regional tour that followed the July 2017 tournament, citing damaged right knee ligaments, and indicated he would need a month's rest to recover. He returned for the September tournament, but exacerbated his injury on the second day and was forced to withdraw, with reports indicating a right knee anterior cruciate ligament injury and a left knee meniscus injury that would require surgery. With the subsequent extended rehabilitation, he only returned to the competition a year later at the September 2018 contest, having dropped three divisions in the rankings to near the bottom of sandanme. In this tournament he went 6–1 to stop his slide, and followed that with an undefeated 7–0 record and sandamne division championship in the November 2018 tournament. This returned him to makushita for the January 2019 contest, but he re-injured his right-knee ligament on a day 10 bout against future top-division man, Hōshōryū, withdrawing from the remainder of the tournament.

He underwent surgery again in late February 2019, requiring another extended recovery period, from which he only returned the following November, having dropped to the bottom of jonidan, his lowest rank since his debut tournament. He achieved a 6–1 record in this first tournament back, and in the following tournament in January 2020, from the rank of jonidan 28, an undefeated 7–0 record and a playoff victory earned Ura the division championship. Fighting at the rank of sandanme 30 at the March tournament, Ura won his second straight division championship with another perfect 7–0 record and a playoff win. This result earned him a return to makushita for the July tournament (the May tournament having been cancelled due to the COVID-19 pandemic), and he extended his winning streak to 18 matches before finishing at 6–1 and earning a spot in the upper ranks of makushita, where another 6–1 in September elevated him back to jūryō after 15 tournaments in lower divisions. He is only the second former top division wrestler after Terunofuji to fall as far as jonidan and make a return to jūryō, earning 9–6 and 10–5 records on his first two tournaments back in November 2020 and January 2021, respectively. In the March 2021 tournament he reached 6–2 on Day 8 after a win over another fan favorite, Enhō, a highly-anticipated first match between the two in professional sumo, but a minor injury Ura suffered in the contest forced his withdrawal from the next two days of the tournament, before returning to gain 4 additional wins.

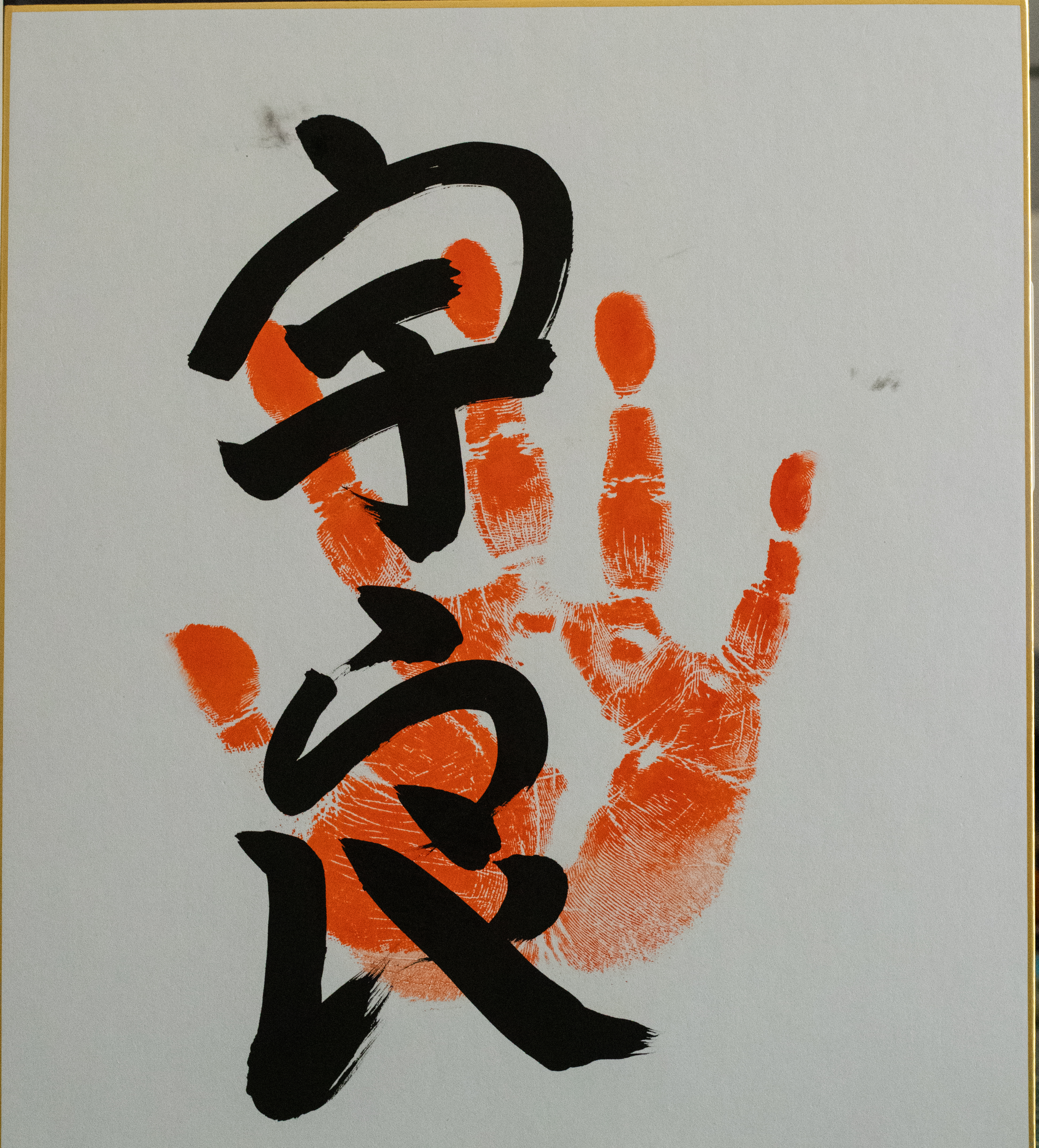
Ura tegata (handprint & signature)

Ura won the jūryō championship in May 2021 with a 12–3 record, ensuring his return to makuuchi after 21 tournaments away. He now holds the record for the lowest rank reached before a successful makuuchi return (jonidan 106 West).

=== Return to top division ===
Ura began the July 2021 tournament ranked at maegashira 13, and after a 10–5 record rose to maegashira 6 for September. In a tournament that included a pairing that matched him against fellow top division returnee and newly-promoted yokozuna Terunofuji, he finished 7-8. He then opened the November tournament one rank lower at maegashira 7. In this tournament he produced a 10–5 record and won his first special prize, for Technique, and as a consequence surpassing his pre-injury highest rank, opening the January 2022 tournament at maegashira 2 and again achieving a winning record of 8–7. At maegashira 1 in March, he finished 4–11, dropping him to maegashira 6. In the May 2022 tournament, Ura's record after the 13th day stood at 9–4, just one win behind three leaders tied on 10–3, but he withdrew from the tournament on Day 14 with a left ankle injury.

In the September 2022 tournament, Ura stood out by winning his fourth day with a rare tsutaezori technique and earned his second kinboshi when he defeated yokozuna Terunofuji on the sixth day. In the November tournament Ura ended with a 4–11 record.

In the January 2023 tournament Ura finished with a 7–8 record. In the March tournament Ura secured a 9–6 record.

=== San'yaku promotion ===
Following an 8-win record at the top maegashira rank in November 2023, Ura was promoted to komusubi, reaching san'yaku for the first time in his career. Ura said after the promotion that he was happy, adding that he thought he would never make it to the komusubi rank. He became the first former top-division competitor in the history of sumo to reach san'yaku after being demoted to jonidan. Ura finished the tournament 6–9, however, beating Ryūden on the final day using the rare winning technique tsutaezori ('underarm forward body drop').

Ura was demoted to maegashira 1 for the March 2024 tournament. Despite finishing that tournament with a losing record, he stood out in the first week by beating three of the then four ōzeki (Hōshōryū, Kirishima and Kotonowaka). Ura took the early lead in the following tournament in May by winning six consecutive matches in the first week of the competition, achieving this series of consecutive victories for the first time in his career. His position as leader came to an end, however, when he lost his seventh and eighth matches to ōzeki Kotozakura (the former Kotonowaka) and Hōshōryū respectively. He lost six more times in a row and finished the tournament with another losing record.

In the first tournament of 2025, Ura won his match against Takayasu by beating him with the rare kimarite (technique) of tsutaezori, drawing a positive reaction from Nishiiwa (formerly Wakanosato), then commentator on NHK. During the May tournament of the same year, Ura repeated the same move against the same opponent to claim a third victory, although he mentioned a jaw injury which he played down to journalists.

Near the end of the July 2025 tournament, Ura—who had already achieved a winning record—injured his knee in a bout against Wakatakakage. He withdrew from the tournament the next day.

On the fourth day of the November 2026 tournament, Ura, then ranked maegashira 2, earned the third kinboshi of his career by defeating yokozuna Hōshōryū.

== Style ==
When he first entered the professional ranks Ura's weight was listed as 113 kg (249 lb), but by May 2017 he had bulked up to 137 kg (302 lb) and by March 2021 to 143 kg (315 lb), heavier than the other 'small' sekitori such as Ishiura, Terutsuyoshi, Tobizaru and Enhō. When he first became a sekitori, he displeased some sumo elders as one of several younger wrestlers bucking tradition by choosing colorful mawashi over the traditional brown or black, in his case opting for deep pink.

Ura is predominantly a pusher. However, observers have noted his tendency to be unpredictable, with former yokozuna Wakanohana even saying that he has "no style", which prevents his opponents from anticipating him. The unpredictability of his improvisational style that responds to opponents' moves has made him popular. Ura has been called "agile as a gymnast" and his bouts acrobatic. His favourite techniques as listed in his Japan Sumo Association profile include oshi pushing/thrusting techniques as well as the rare ashitori (leg grab), and he has also drawn notice for performing other rare winning techniques.

Known for his rare kimarite, Ura won a jūryō bout by koshinage, a hip throw, during the May 2016 tournament. He employed another rare winning technique at the January 2017 tournament, tasukizori ('reverse backward body drop'), against fellow jūryō wrestler, Amakaze, its first instance in sumo's upper divisions since 1955 when winning techniques were first announced. In the November 2020 tournament he deployed two unusual techniques. On the fifth day he used izori to defeat Kyokushūhō, the first time the move had been seen at sekitori-level since Tomonohana used it against Hananokuni in September 1993. Tamagaki (the former Tomonohana) was at the ringside in his role as a judge to see Ura's win. On the fourteenth day of the same tournament Ura defeated Azumaryū with the rare ushiromotare, or "backward lean out," which brought cheers from the crowd when the technique was announced. During the twelfth day of the May 2023 tournament, Ura won his match against Tobizaru using the very rare kimarite winning technique zubuneri. This technique had not been used in makuuchi for 25 years. Since he used the kimarite of tsutaezori a total of three times out of the five times this technique was used in makuuchi during the 2024-2025 period, Ura was asked if he trained precisely to perform complicated kimarite. Ura replied that he didn't apply any specific training.

== Career record ==
Ura Kazuki
Year	January Hatsu basho, Tokyo	March Haru basho, Osaka	May Natsu basho, Tokyo	July Nagoya basho, Nagoya	September Aki basho, Tokyo	November Kyūshū basho, Fukuoka
2015	x	(Maezumō)	West Jonokuchi #9; 7–0; Champion	East Jonidan #10; 7–0–P	West Sandanme #18; 5–2	West Makushita #54; 7–0–P
2016	West Makushita #6; 6–1–P	West Makushita #2; 6–1	West Jūryō #13; 10–5	West Jūryō #8; 11–4	East Jūryō #1; 6–9	East Jūryō #5; 8–7
2017	East Jūryō #3; 11–4	West Maegashira #12; 8–7	West Maegashira #10; 11–4	East Maegashira #4; 7–8 ★	West Maegashira #4; 1–2–12	West Maegashira #16; Sat out due to injury 0–0–15
2018	East Jūryō #11; Sat out due to injury 0–0–15	West Makushita #10; Sat out due to injury 0–0–7	West Makushita #50; Sat out due to injury 0–0–7	West Sandanme #30; Sat out due to injury 0–0–7	East Sandanme #91; 6–1	East Sandanme #33; 7–0; Champion
2019	West Makushita #23; 2–3–2	West Makushita #36; Sat out due to injury 0–0–7	West Sandanme #16; Sat out due to injury 0–0–7	West Sandanme #76; Sat out due to injury 0–0–7	West Jonidan #36; Sat out due to injury 0–0–7	West Jonidan #106; 6–1
2020	East Jonidan #28; 7–0–P; Champion	West Sandanme #30; 7–0–P; Champion	East Makushita #19; Tournament Cancelled; State of Emergency; 0–0–0	East Makushita #19; 6–1	West Makushita #5; 6–1	East Jūryō #13; 9–6
2021	East Jūryō #10; 10–5	East Jūryō #7; 10–4–1	East Jūryō #2; 12–3; Champion	West Maegashira #13; 10–5	East Maegashira #6; 7–8	East Maegashira #7; 10–5; T
2022	East Maegashira #2; 8–7	West Maegashira #1; 4–11	East Maegashira #6; 9–5–1	West Maegashira #3; 7–8	West Maegashira #3; 8–7 ★	East Maegashira #3; 4–11
2023	West Maegashira #7; 7–8	West Maegashira #8; 9–6	East Maegashira #4; 7–8	West Maegashira #4; 7–8	West Maegashira #4; 9–6	West Maegashira #1; 8–7
2024	West Komusubi #1; 6–9	East Maegashira #1; 6–9	West Maegashira #4; 7–8	West Maegashira #4; 6–9	East Maegashira #5; 9–6	West Maegashira #2; 5–10
2025	West Maegashira #4; 7–8	East Maegashira #5; 7–8	East Maegashira #5; 5–10	East Maegashira #9; 8–6–1	East Maegashira #8; 10–5	West Maegashira #3; 8–7
2026	East Maegashira #2; 4–11	East Maegashira #8; 5–10	East Maegashira #11; 10–5	East Maegashira #5; 5–10	East Maegashira #9; 10–5	East Maegashira #2; 6–9 ★
Record given as wins–losses–absences Top division champion Top division runner-up Retired Non-participation Jūryō Lower divisions Sanshō key: F=Fighting spirit; O=Outstanding performance; T=Technique Also shown: ★=Kinboshi; P=Playoff(s); Divisions: Makuuchi — Jūryō — Makushita — Sandanme — Jonidan — Jonokuchi Makuuchi ranks: Yokozuna — Ōzeki — Sekiwake — Komusubi — Maegashira

== See also ==
- Glossary of sumo terms
- List of active sumo wrestlers
- List of active gold star earners
- List of active special prize winners
- List of sumo record holders
- List of sumo tournament second division champions
