= Sumo Didi =

2023 Indian film by Jayant Rohatgi

- Official release poster
- Directed by: Jayant Rohatgi
- Written by: Anish Diddee; Ajay Gahlaut; Nikhil Sachan
- Produced by: Jyoti Deshpande; Akash Chawla; Arunava Sengupta; Amit Chandraa
- Starring: Shriyam Bhagnani; Chaitnya Sharma
- Cinematography: Akash Agrawal
- Edited by: Dev Rao Jadhav
- Music by: Amar Mangrulkar
- Production companies: Fresh Lime Films; Jio Studios; MA+TH Entertainment Network
- Distributed by: ZEE5
- Release dates: 27 October 2023 (Tokyo); 23 October 2026 (India)
- Running time: 118 minutes
- Country: India
- Language: Hindi

Sumo Didi is a 2023 Indian Hindi-language sports biographical film on the life of Hetal Dave, India's only professional female sumo wrestler. The film is the directorial debut of Jayant Rohatgi, and stars Shriyam Bhagnani in title role with Chaitnya Sharma, Anubha Fatehpura, Nitesh Pandey, and Raghav Dheer. The film has been showcased at multiple film festival including 2023 Tokyo International Film Festival, 2024 Palm Springs International Film Festival, and 24th New York Indian Film Festival. It released on ZEE5 on 23 October 2026.

The biopic follows Hetal who sets out for Japan to endure rigorous training and discover a potential she never knew she had. The film premiered at the 36th Tokyo International Film Festival. The film is produced by Fresh Lime Films, Jio Studios, and Japanese advertising giant Hakuhodo’s MA&TH or Marching Ants & Trigger Happy Entertainment.

== Plot ==
The Hindi language film tells the story of Hetal Dave, a middle class girl from a conservative household who discovers Sumo Wrestling by chance and defies all odds to turn her perceived weakness into strength and breaks the glass ceiling. The film is inspired by the life of India's first and only female sumo wrestler Hetal Dave.

== Cast ==
- Shriyam Bhagnani as Hetal Dave
- Chaitanya Sharma
- Anubha Fatehpura as Sudha
- Nitesh Pandey
- Raghav Dheer
- Nilanjan Datta as Footbal Coach Ganguly

== Production ==
=== Development ===
To prepare for the title role of Hetal Dave, actress Shriyam Bhagnani had to undergo several months of rigorous physical training. As the role is of a sumo wrestler, she also put on a lot of weight (14 kilos at least). She also collaborated with celebrity trainer Sahil Rasheed to build muscle mass and enhance her athleticism. She also trained with Hetal Dave to learn sumo wrestling.

=== Filming ===
Sumo Didi has been shot extensively in Japan, where sumo wrestling is the national sport; and in Mumbai, Kolkata of India, where it is not even a recognized sport.

== Reception ==
The Times of India gave the film 3.5/5, describing it as “an engaging, empathetic sports drama that challenges social conventions.” It highlighted Bhagnani’s physical transformation and her portrayal of Hetal’s determination, vulnerability, and quiet defiance, while noting some pacing issues in the middle portion. Scroll.in described the film as “a touching tale of perseverance and self-discovery,” saying that although its narrative arc was familiar, it benefited from a likeable heroine, affable characters, and sensitivity toward women’s ambitions. The review singled out Bhagnani for “movingly” conveying Hetal’s resilience. The Hollywood Reporter India praised the film for resisting broad caricature and for letting its central figure’s context “breathe.” It called Bhagnani’s performance “lived-in and durable,” noting her ability to balance mainstream expressiveness with physical rigour.

The film also received a warm response at international festivals. It premiered at the 36th Tokyo International Film Festival and screened at the 35th Palm Springs International Film Festival; reports said audiences gave it “excellent” ratings, and it was described as the only Indian film screened at both festivals that year.

Some critics felt the screenplay followed familiar sports-biopic conventions. Rediff.com appreciated Bhagnani’s “uninhibited, wholehearted performance” but argued that routine writing and clichés limited the film’s impact. India Today called it “a passable film” with a worthwhile subject, but criticized its predictable screenplay, underdeveloped relationships, and uneven music.
