= Hiyori Kon =

Japanese amateur sumo wrestler (born 1997)

- Born: August 1997 (age 28); Ajigasawa, Aomori, Japan
- Citizenship: Japan
- Occupation: Sumo wrestler

Medal record

Representing Japan

Women's Sumo

World Games
Silver medal – second place	2022 Birmingham	Openweight

Hiyori Kon (Japanese: 今 日和) is a Japanese amateur sumo wrestler, who is known for advocating for equal rights for women to compete professionally in Japan. She has been included in the BBC's list of 100 inspiring and influential women from around the world for 2019.

== Life ==
Born August 1997 in Ajigasawa, Aomori, Kon started wrestling in first grade when she was six, inspired by her siblings' interest, and began competing and winning against boys. When she reached university, studying gender theory at Ritsumeikan University, she became the third woman to join its sumo club. Kon believes sumo wrestling is not just a sport, but a form of expression.

Japan is the only country in the world where sumo is practiced professionally, governed by the Japan Sumo Association. According to sumo's ancient Shinto and Buddhist beliefs, women are not allowed to enter or touch the wrestling ring (dohyō) as they are considered "impure." The JSA follows this tradition that has been firmly maintained through the centuries, believing it would be a dishonor to all of their ancestors to change it. This has been enforced to the point where two women had gotten in trouble with a referee for entering the ring to perform first aid on a man who had collapsed in 2018, although a JSA official later disapproved of the referee's actions as it was a life-threatening situation.

There are several amateur sumo competitions in Japan and around the world where women compete. Kon won the heavyweight division of the Women Junior World Sumo Championships in 2014 and 2015. She also competed in the 2018 and 2019 Sumo World Championships, where she won silver both times. Kon was the subject of Little Miss Sumo, a 2019 Netflix documentary directed by Matt Kay that followed her to the 2018 championship. After graduating from university, Kon joined the sumo works team sponsored by Aisin Seiki as its first female member. In 2022, Kon won a silver medal at the World Games in the women's openweight division.

== See also ==
- Women's sumo
