= Sumo at the 2013 World Combat Games =

Sumo, for the 2013 World Combat Games, took place at the St. Petersburg Sports and Concert Complex Hall 2, in Saint Petersburg, Russia, on the 18 and 19 October 2013.

== Medal table ==
* Host nation (Russia)

Rank	Nation	Gold	Silver	Bronze	Total
1	Russia (RUS)*	4	2	6	12
2	Japan (JPN)	3	1	1	5
3	Mongolia (MGL)	1	2	1	4
4	Ukraine (UKR)	0	3	5	8
5	Bulgaria (BUL)	0	0	1	1
5	New Zealand (NZL)	0	0	1	1
5	Venezuela (VEN)	0	0	1	1
Totals (7 entries)		8	8	16	32

== Medal summary ==
=== Men ===
Event	Gold	Silver	Bronze
Lightweight	Kazuki Ura (JPN)	Tatsuma Kawaguchi (JPN)	Batyr Altyev (RUS)
Lightweight	Kazuki Ura (JPN)	Tatsuma Kawaguchi (JPN)	Markov Stiliyan Georgiev (BUL)
Middleweight	Ryo Ito (JPN)	Usukhbayar Ochirkhuu (MGL)	Kostiantyn Iermakov (UKR)
Middleweight	Ryo Ito (JPN)	Usukhbayar Ochirkhuu (MGL)	Atsamaz Kaziev (RUS)
Heavyweight	Byambajav Ulambayaryn (MGL)	Alan Karaev (RUS)	Oleg Baroev (RUS)
Heavyweight	Byambajav Ulambayaryn (MGL)	Alan Karaev (RUS)	Vasilii Margiev (RUS)
Open division	Vasilii Margiev (RUS)	Naranbat Gankhuyag (MGL)	Byambajav Ulambayaryn (MGL)
Open division	Vasilii Margiev (RUS)	Naranbat Gankhuyag (MGL)	Mark Tanu (NZL)

=== Women ===
Event	Gold	Silver	Bronze
Lightweight	Miku Yamanaka (JPN)	Tatiana Iaroshevich (RUS)	Alina Boykova (UKR)
Lightweight	Miku Yamanaka (JPN)	Tatiana Iaroshevich (RUS)	Vera Koval (RUS)
Middleweight	Svetlana Panteleeva (RUS)	Maryna Maksymenko (UKR)	Maryna Pryshchepa (UKR)
Middleweight	Svetlana Panteleeva (RUS)	Maryna Maksymenko (UKR)	Asano Matsuura (JPN)
Heavyweight	Anna Zhigalova (RUS)	Ivanna Berezovska (UKR)	Svitlana Yaromka (UKR)
Heavyweight	Anna Zhigalova (RUS)	Ivanna Berezovska (UKR)	Olesya Kovalenko (RUS)
Open division	Anna Zhigalova (RUS)	Svitlana Yaromika (UKR)	Alejandra Maria Cedeno Henriquez (VEN)
Open division	Anna Zhigalova (RUS)	Svitlana Yaromika (UKR)	Ivanna Berezovska (UKR)
