= Fresh Patch =

Fresh Patch LLC
- Type: Private
- Industry: Pet products
- Founded: 2010
- Founder: Andrew Feld
- Headquarters: Oxnard, California
- Products: Fresh Patch
- Website: freshpatch.com

Fresh Patch LLC is an American e-commerce company that delivers hydroponically grown grass patches to pet owners within the United States. The ABC television network featured Fresh Patch on its show Shark Tank.

== History ==
On July 6, 2010, the Fresh Patch Company began operating from its headquarters in Florida. Its flagship product is a disposable pet commode consisting of hydroponically grown grass within a cardboard container. On September 3, 2013, the U.S. Patent and Trademark Office issued a patent for the construction and continuous delivery/replacement method of the product (U.S. Patent No. 8,522,719).

On February 3, 2015, the company pitched its product on the ABC television show Shark Tank. President Andrew Feld made the pitch, with the main points being the $1 million in sales, subscription-based business model, and plans to reduce shipping costs by establishing an East Coast distribution facility. On the show, Barbara Corcoran and Mark Cuban made a combined offer of $150,000 for a 20% stake in the company—contingent on expansion of sales into retail stores.
