= Maryna Pryshchepa =

Ukrainian judoka

Personal information
- Full name: Maryna Andriivna Pryshchepa
- Born: 28 July 1983 (age 42) Kiev, Ukrainian SSR, Soviet Union
- Occupation(s): Judoka, Sumo wrestler, Sambist
- Height: 1.70 m (5 ft 7 in)

Sport
- Country: Ukraine
- Sport: Judo, Sumo, Sambo
- Weight class: ‍–‍70 kg, ‍–‍78 kg

Achievements and titles
- Olympic Games: R16 (2012)
- World Champ.: (silver) (2009)
- European Champ.: (silver) (2009)
Medal record
Representing Ukraine
Women's judo
World Championships
Silver medal – second place	2009 Rotterdam	‍–‍78 kg
European Championships
Silver medal – second place	2009 Tbilisi	‍–‍78 kg
Bronze medal – third place	2006 Tampere	‍–‍70 kg
Bronze medal – third place	2007 Belgrade	‍–‍70 kg
Bronze medal – third place	2010 Vienna	‍–‍78 kg
Bronze medal – third place	2012 Chelyabinsk	‍–‍78 kg
IJF Grand Slam
Bronze medal – third place	2009 Paris	‍–‍78 kg
Bronze medal – third place	2009 Moscow	‍–‍78 kg
IJF Grand Prix
Silver medal – second place	2009 Abu Dhabi	‍–‍78 kg
Bronze medal – third place	2010 Abu Dhabi	‍–‍78 kg
European U23 Championships
Gold medal – first place	2004 Ljubljana	‍–‍70 kg
Silver medal – second place	2005 Kyiv	‍–‍70 kg
World Juniors Championships
Silver medal – second place	2002 Jeju	‍–‍70 kg
European Junior Championships
Silver medal – second place	2001 Budapest	‍–‍70 kg
Bronze medal – third place	2000 Nicosia	‍–‍70 kg
Bronze medal – third place	2002 Rotterdam	‍–‍70 kg
Women's Sumo
World Games
Silver medal – second place	2009 Kaohsiung	Middleweight
Gold medal – first place	2013 Cali	Middleweight
World Combat Games
Gold medal – first place	2010 Beijing	Middleweight
Bronze medal – third place	2013 Saint Petersburg	Middleweight
Women's Sambo
World Championships
Gold medal – first place	2005 Astana	‍–‍80 kg
Gold medal – first place	2007 Prague	‍–‍72 kg
Gold medal – first place	2012 Minsk	‍–‍80 kg
Gold medal – first place	2013 Saint Petersburg	‍–‍80 kg
European Championships
Gold medal – first place	2013 Crema	‍–‍80 kg

Profile at external databases
- IJF: 555
- JudoInside.com: 13967
- Updated on 5 September 2023

Maryna Pryshchepa (Ukrainian: Марина Прищепа; born 28 July 1983) is a Ukrainian judoka.

== Career ==
She competed at the 2008 Summer Olympics (Beijing) in the -78 kg event and lost her opening match to Heide Wollert. Four years later in London, she participated in the -78 kg tournament of the 2012 Summer Olympics and was eliminated in her first match by Audrey Tcheuméo of France.

Pryshchepa won a silver medal at the 2009 World Judo Championships. She also has a silver medal (2009) and four bronze medals (2006, 2007, 2010, 2012) at the European Judo Championships.

Pryshchepa is also competing in sambo and sumo. She is a world sambo champion. Since 2008 Pryshchepa has been representing Ukraine in sumo. She won two medals in sumo at the World Games.
