= Little Miss Sumo =

2018 documentary film by Matt Kay

- Film poster
- Directed by: Matt Kay
- Written by: Matt Kay
- Produced by: Andrew Carver Didi Mae Hand Matt Kay
- Starring: Hiyori Kon
- Cinematography: Matt Kay David Woo
- Edited by: Isabel Freeman Rebecca Gin
- Music by: Kwes
- Production company: Walks of Life Films
- Distributed by: Netflix
- Release dates: October 18, 2018 (London); October 28, 2019
- Running time: 19 minutes
- Country: United Kingdom
- Languages: Japanese; English

Little Miss Sumo is a 2018 documentary film directed and written by Matt Kay. The premise revolves around the 20-year-old sumo wrestler Hiyori Kon, one of few women practising the sport.

== Release ==
Little Miss Sumo premiered at the 2018 London Film Festival, and was released on October 28, 2019, on Netflix. The film won the Community and Culture Award at the 2019 Kendal Mountain Festival.
