= Hetal Dave =

Professional female sumo wrestler

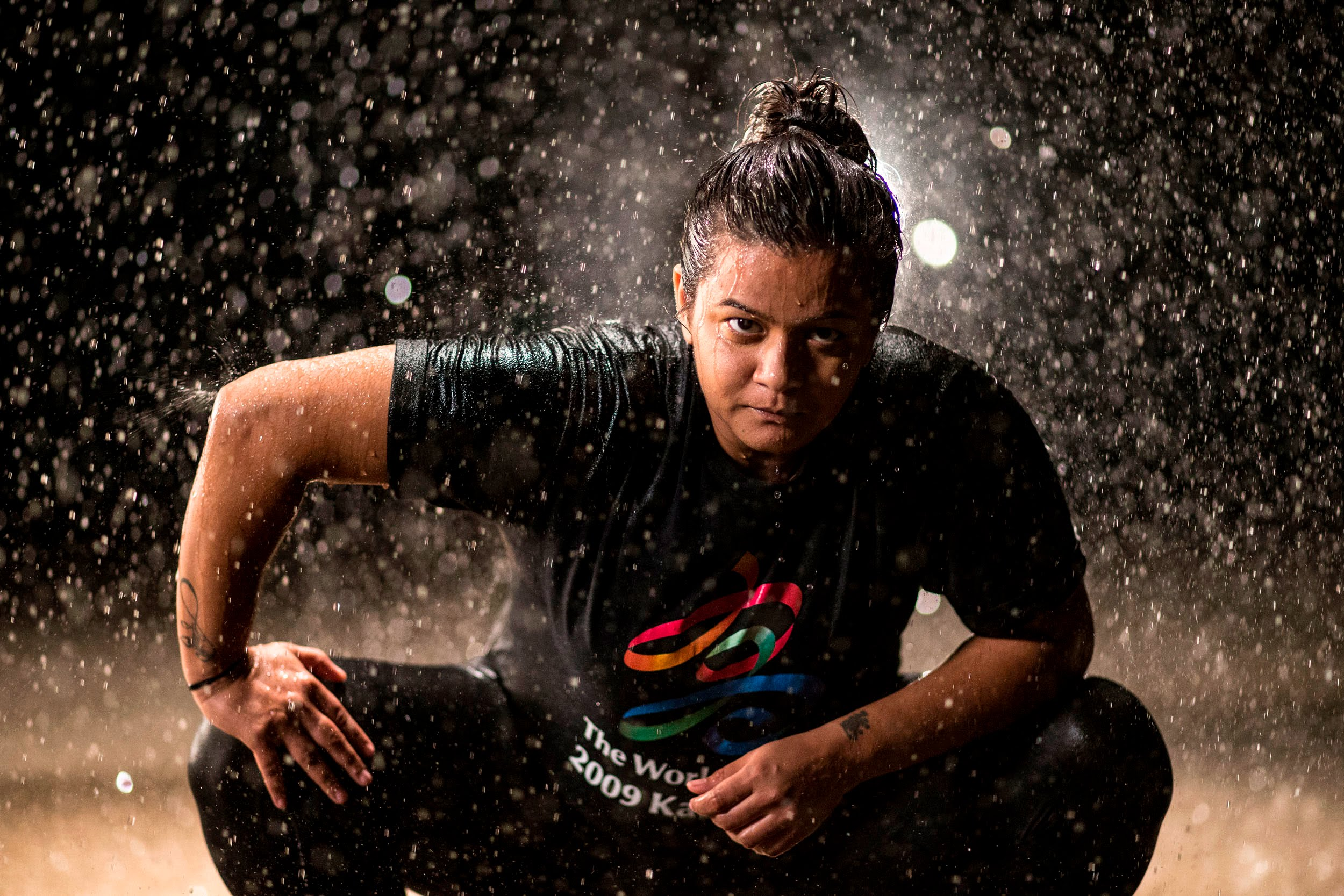

Personal information
- Nationality: Indian
- Citizenship: Indian
- Born: 8 December 1987 (age 38)

Sport
- Country: India
- Sport: Sumo

Hetal Dave (born 8 December 1987) is an Indian sumo wrestler. In 2008, she made it into the Limca Book of Records.

She participated in the 2009 World Games held in Taiwan, but went out in the first round.

== Personal life ==
Hetal hails from Mumbai. Her father and brother were very supportive of her interests in pursuing the sport. She is a commerce graduate and also trains students in wrestling and judo in different schools.

Dave is a judo trainer and she started her judo lessons when she was 6.

== Training ==
Dave has no opponents to train with in India and as such has to practice with male players alongside her brother Akshay. India does not have a sumo ring, so she had to practice in natural terrain, and she chose Oval Maidan in South Mumbai.

Her first international championship took place in Estonia in 2008. She came among the global top 8 and was included in a list of 150 fearless women by Newsweek.

After Estonia, Dave has represented India in tournaments at Poland, Finland and Taiwan. At the 2009 World Games, she stood fifth in the women's middleweight category.

== Recognition ==
Despite sumo wrestling not being amongst the recognized sports in India, Dave has represented India in several competitions.

When she participated in the World Games she was the only female participant from India to represent the country and Sumo out of more than 200 games. She has represented India in competitions in Poland, Finland, Estonia, and Taiwan.

== In popular culture ==
In a season of sports biopics, a biopic on Hetal Dave titled 'Sumo Didi' is being made. The film is directed by Jayant Rohatgi, and stars Shriyam Bhagnani in the title role. The film is produced by Freshlime Films and MA&TH Entertainment and presented by Jio Studios.
