= Alan Karaev =

Sumo wrestler

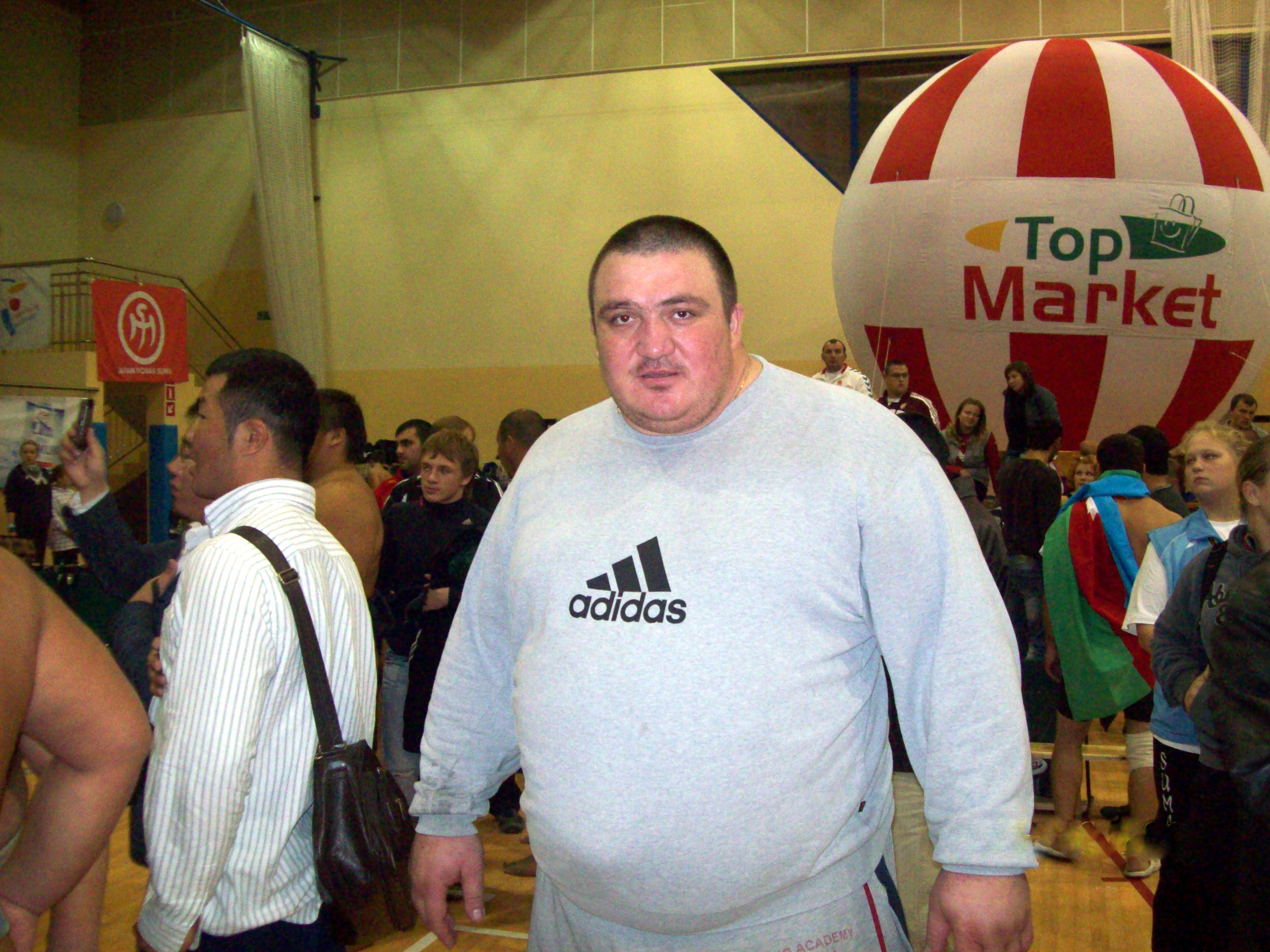
- Born: May 19, 1977 (age 49); Digora, Russian SFSR, Soviet Union
- Native name: Алан Караев
- Nationality: Russian
- Height: 6 ft 7 in (2.01 m)
- Weight: 403 lb (183 kg; 28.8 st)
- Division: Super Heavyweight
- Style: Sumo
- Team: RINGS Russia
- Years active: 2005–2006

Mixed martial arts record
- Total: 5
- Wins: 2
- By knockout: 1
- By submission: 1
- Losses: 3
- By knockout: 2
- By submission: 1
- Draws: 0

Other information
- Mixed martial arts record from Sherdog
- Last updated on: April 23, 2011

Medal record

Men's sumo

Representing Russia

World Games
Gold medal – first place	2013 Cali	Heavyweight
Bronze medal – third place	2009 Kaohsiung	Heavyweight

World Combat Games
Silver medal – second place	2013 St. Petersburg	Heavyweight
Gold medal – first place	2010 Beijing	Open
Gold medal – first place	2010 Beijing	Heavyweight

Alan Taymurazovich Karaev (Russian: Алан Таймуразович Караев; born May 19, 1977) is a Russian sumo wrestler and former mixed martial artist.

== Biography ==
Karaev was born in Digora, North Ossetia and graduated from North Ossetian State University. He became the amateur sumo world champion in 2002 and Russian national champion in 2003. He was also the world arm wrestling champion on seven occasions and Russian national champion multiple times.

He made his debut in mixed martial arts on March 26, 2005 against veteran fighter Gary Goodridge at Hero's 1. Goodridge was able to submit Karaev with a forearm choke in the first round. He returned to face Bob Sapp at Hero's 2 on July 6, 2005 and again lost in the first round, this time via knock out.

On September 17, 2005, he recorded the first win of his career when he knocked out Tomohiko Hashimoto in seven seconds at GCM: D.O.G. 3. This earned his a return to the K-1 Hero's promotion and he took on legendary kickboxer Jérôme Le Banner at K-1 PREMIUM 2005 Dynamite!! on New Year's Eve, 2005. Le Banner defeated Karaev via kicks to the body.

His final fight came on February 4, 2006 when he submitted Koji Kanechika with an americana keylock at a MARS event.

== Mixed martial arts record ==
Professional record breakdown
5 matches	2 wins	3 losses
By knockout	1	2
By submission	1	1
By decision	0	0

Res.	Record	Opponent	Method	Event	Date	Round	Time	Location	Notes
Win	2–3	Koji Kanechika	Submission (keylock)	MARS	February 4, 2006	1	3:09	Tokyo, Japan	
Loss	1–3	Jérôme Le Banner	KO (body kick)	K-1 PREMIUM 2005 Dynamite!!	December 31, 2005	2	1:14	Osaka, Japan	
Win	1–2	Tomohiko Hashimoto	TKO (punches)	GCM: D.O.G. 3	September 17, 2005	1	0:07	Tokyo, Japan	
Loss	0–2	Bob Sapp	KO (punch)	Hero's 2	July 6, 2005	1	3:44	Tokyo, Japan	
Loss	0–1	Gary Goodridge	Submission (forearm choke)	Hero's 1	March 26, 2005	1	2:58	Saitama, Japan	
