= Byamba =

Mongolian sumo wrestler (1984–2020)

Daishōchi Kenta
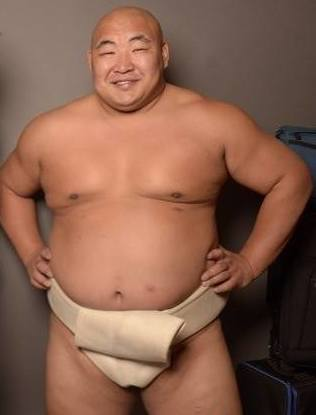
- Byamba in 2010

Personal information
- Native name: 大翔地 健太
- Born: Ulambayar Byambajav; November 24, 1984 Ulaanbaatar, Mongolian People's Republic
- Died: 28 February 2020 (aged 35) Los Angeles, California, U.S.
- Height: 1.84 m (6 ft 1/2 in)
- Weight: 152 kg (335 lb)

Sport
- Sport: Sumo
- Retired: September 2005
- Heya: Shibatayama
- Record: 95-66-14
- Debut: July 2001
- Highest rank: Makushita 15 (March 2005)
- Championships: 1 (Jonokuchi)
- Updated on May 2013

Medal record

Men's Sumo

Representing Mongolia

World Games
Gold medal – first place	2009 Kaohsiung	Open

World Combat Games
Gold medal – first place	2013 St. Petersburg	Heavyweight
Bronze medal – third place	2013 St. Petersburg	Open
Bronze medal – third place	2010 Beijing	Open

Ulambayar Byambajav (Mongolian: Уламбаярын Бямбажав, romanized: Ulambajarín Bjambazsav; 24 November 1984 – 28 February 2020), known professionally as Byamba, was a Mongolian sumo wrestler and entertainer. He began his professional career in Japan in 2001 under the name Daishōchi Kenta (Japanese: 大翔地 健太); tiring of the lifestyle, he retired from professional sumo wrestling in 2005. As an amateur, he won the Sumo World Championships twice in 2006 and 2007 and was a gold medalist at the 2009 World Games and 2013 World Combat Games. He also appeared on the comedy show Impractical Jokers. He died after a protracted illness in a Los Angeles hospital in February 2020.

== Sumo career ==
He was born in Ulaanbaatar, and took up Mongolian wrestling at the age of 9, but he preferred playing basketball. He won junior titles in wrestling, judo and sambo. He was recruited as a professional sumo wrestler (rikishi) by former yokozuna Onokuni who was on a visit to Mongolia. He competed under the shikona of Daishōchi Kenta. In September 2001 just after his debut, he would win out in a six-way playoff to secure the sixth division championship. He was a member of Shibatayama stable from July 2001 until September 2005, reaching a highest rank of makushita 15. However, tiring of the lifestyle, he quit at age 20 and as well as an amateur sumo career he also featured in film and television roles in Hollywood, and many commercials. He won the Sumo World Championships in 2006 and 2007. He won the US Sumo Open Championship held in California for eight consecutive years, from 2007 to 2014. His overall record at the US Sumo Open was 110 wins and 7 losses.

== US film and television appearances ==
Upon retiring from professional sumo, Byambajav moved to Los Angeles. Having limited English, he initially worked in menial jobs and manual labour. However, he was able to gain a role as a sumo wrestler in the film Ocean's Thirteen (2007), through the Californian Sumo Association. In 2010, he spent 1 week in the house of Gran Hermano 12 (Big Brother Spain). In February 2013, he was featured on the American television show King of the Nerds. In April 2014, he appeared as the celebrity special guest on the CW comedy improv series Whose Line Is It Anyway?. In 2014 he was featured in One Direction's video for "Steal My Girl" alongside fellow sumo wrestler Yamamotoyama Ryūta. In May 2015, he appeared alongside Yamamotoyama in an episode of The Bachelorette.

Byamba appeared in the April 16, 2015, episode of the TruTV series Impractical Jokers, titled "Pseudo-Sumo". The loser, Joe, was told he was going to be in a baby commercial, and was then surprised by Byamba. Byamba appeared again on Impractical Jokers, on August 16, 2018, in an episode titled "Bull Shiatsu", in which Joe lost again. This time Joe was dressed inside a home-made massage chair, manually massages people at a mall. The punishment didn't end until he massages his former adversary, Byamba. In 2016, he appeared as a figure skating sumo wrestler in a television advertisement for GEICO. In 2017 he promoted a new variety of mandarin orange called the "Sumo Citrus" in Lindsay, California. He featured as a model for the Subaru car company. He appeared in a video for Vice Media showing the diet of a sumo wrestler.

== Personal life and death ==
Byamba died in a Los Angeles hospital on February 28, 2020, after a protracted illness. He was married, with one child.

== Professional sumo career record ==
Daishōchi Kenta
Year	January Hatsu basho, Tokyo	March Haru basho, Osaka	May Natsu basho, Tokyo	July Nagoya basho, Nagoya	September Aki basho, Tokyo	November Kyūshū basho, Fukuoka
2001	x	x	x	(Maezumo)	West Jonokuchi #46; 6–1–PPP; Champion	East Jonidan #73; 6–1
2002	West Jonidan #3; 5–2	East Sandanme #68; 3–4	East Sandanme #87; 4–3	West Sandanme #69; 5–2	East Sandanme #39; 4–3	West Sandanme #23; 3–4
2003	West Sandanme #39; 3–4	West Sandanme #57; 6–1	East Sandanme #6; 3–4	West Sandanme #16; 6–1	East Makushita #37; 5–2	West Makushita #26; 1–6
2004	West Makushita #48; 6–1	East Makushita #20; 2–5	West Makushita #37; 2–5	East Sandanme #2; 6–1	West Makushita #29; 4–3	East Makushita #24; 4–3
2005	East Makushita #19; 4–3	West Makushita #15; 3–4	West Makushita #20; 4–3	West Makushita #15; Sat out due to injury 0–0–7	West Makushita #55; Retired; 0–0–7	x
Record given as wins–losses–absences Top division champion Top division runner-up Retired Lower divisions Non-participation Sanshō key: F=Fighting spirit; O=Outstanding performance; T=Technique Also shown: ★=Kinboshi; P=Playoff(s); Divisions: Makuuchi — Jūryō — Makushita — Sandanme — Jonidan — Jonokuchi Makuuchi ranks: Yokozuna — Ōzeki — Sekiwake — Komusubi — Maegashira

== See also ==
- Glossary of sumo terms
- List of past sumo wrestlers
- List of Mongolian sumo wrestlers
- List of non-Japanese sumo wrestlers
