= Anna Zhigalova =

Russian sumo wrestler

Anna Poliakova
Personal information
- Full name: Полякова Анна Сергеевна
- Nationality: Russia
- Born: Anna Zhigalova; 10 December 1981 (age 44) (Soviet Union) Izhevsk, Udmurt, USSR
- Years active: 2003–Present
- Height: 186 cm (6 ft 1 in)
- Weight: 165 kg (364 lb)

Sport
- Sport: Sumo
Medal record
Women's Sumo
Representing Russia
Sumo World Championships
| Gold medal – first place | Wan Chai 2012 | Heavyweight |
| Gold medal – first place | Kaohsiung 2014 | Openweight |
| Gold medal – first place | Ulaanbaatar 2013 | Openweight |
| Gold medal – first place | Taoyuan 2018 | Openweight |
| Gold medal – first place | Osaka 2019 | Heavyweight |
World Games
| Gold medal – first place | Kaohsiung 2009 | Heavyweight |
| Gold medal – first place | Kaohsiung 2009 | Openweight |
| Gold medal – first place | Cali 2013 | Heavyweight |
| Gold medal – first place | Cali 2013 | Openweight |
| Gold medal – first place | Wrocław 2017 | Heavyweight |
| Gold medal – first place | Wrocław 2017 | Openweight |
World Combat Games
| Gold medal – first place | St. Petersburg 2013 | Heavyweight |
| Gold medal – first place | St. Petersburg 2013 | Openweight |

Anna Poliakova (maiden name Anna Zhigalova) is a Russian amateur sumo wrestler. She has won gold medals in both the heavyweight and openweight categories in the 2009, 2013 and 2017 World Games. She has also won seven golds at the Sumo World Championships. In 2018 she was nominated for the World Games Athlete of the Year award.

== Biography ==
She was born in Izhevsk, Udmurt Republic.

She played volleyball from the age of six to twelve, and handball between from thirteen to twenty-one. She is a graduate from Udmurt State University. She has experience working as a swimming instructor in kindergarten. She began Sumo training at September 2003.

== Competition ==
- She won the heavyweight class on 28 October 2012, at the 9th World Sumo Championships in Wan Chai.
- In 2013, she won the heavyweight and openweight divisions of the World Games 2013 Women's Sumo held in Cali, Colombia.
- On 18 and 19 October of the same year, he won the heavyweight and openweight divisions at the 2nd World Combat Games Women's Championship held in St. Petersburg, Russia.
- On 31 August 2014, she won the Openweight class at the 10th World Women's Sumo Championships held in Kaohsiung, Taiwan.
- On 30 July 2016, she won the 12th World Women's Sumo Championships in Mongolia in the individual open weight class.
- On 22 and 23 July 2017, she won the women's division of the 10th World Games 2017 in Wroclaw, Poland, in the heavyweight and openweight divisions.
- On 22 July 2018, she won the 13th World Women's Sumo Championships openweight individual competition at the Taoyuan Arena in Taiwan.
- On 13 October 2019, she won the individual heavyweight class at the 14th World Women's Sumo Championships held at Ohama Sumo Stadium in Sakai City, Japan.
