= Egypt at the 2009 World Games =

- IOC code: EGY

in Kaohsiung, Taiwan July 16, 2009 – July 26, 2009
- Medals: Gold 0 Silver 1 Bronze 3 Total 4

World Games appearances
- 1981; 1985; 1989; 1993; 1997; 2001; 2005; 2009; 2013; 2017; 2022; 2025

Egypt participated at the 2009 World Games in Kaohsiung, Taiwan, from July 16, 2009 to July 26, 2009. They placed 43rd overall in the medal table, getting 4 medals total.

== Competitors ==
Sport	Men	Women	Total
Bodybuilding	1	0	1
Cue sports	2	0	2
Finswimming	4	1	5
Karate	3	2	5
Squash	3	2	5
Sumo	7	0	7
Total	20	5	25

== Medal summary ==
=== Medal table ===
Sport	Gold	Silver	Bronze	Total
Karate	0	1	1	2
Bodybuilding	0	0	1	1
Squash	0	0	1	1
Total	0	1	3	4

=== Medalists ===
Medal	Name	Sport	Event
Silver	Kestha Hany	Karate	Men's Kumite Open
Bronze	Mohamed Kotb	Bodybuilding	Men's 85 kg
Bronze	Tamer Morsy	Karate	Men's Kumite 70 kg
Bronze	Omneya Abdel Kawy	Squash	Women's Singles
