= Edyta Witkowska =

Polish wrestler (born 1979)

Personal information
- Full name: Edyta Witkowska-Popecka
- Nationality: Poland
- Born: 24 July 1979 (age 46)
- Height: 1.75 m (5 ft 9 in)
- Weight: 75 kg (165 lb)

Sport
- Sport: Freestyle Wrestling, Sumo
- Club: Sporta klubs "Platan" (Borkovice)
Medal record
Women's freestyle wrestling
Representing Poland
World Wrestling Championships
Bronze medal – third place	1998 Poznań	75kg
Silver medal – second place	2000 Sofia	75 kg
Gold medal – first place	2001 Sofia	75 kg
Bronze medal – third place	2002 Chalcis	72 kg
Women's Sumo
Representing Poland
World Games
Bronze medal – third place	2005 Duisburg	Heavyweight
Silver medal – second place	2005 Duisburg	Open
Bronze medal – third place	2009 Kaohsiung	Open

Edyta Witkowska-Popecka (born 24 July 1979 in Przysucha) is a retired Polish wrestler and sumo wrestler.

== Career ==
Witkowska won a bronze medal in the Sumo heavyweight event at the 2005 World Games in Duisburg and a silver medal in the Sumo-open weight event. At the 2009 World Games in Kaohsiung she won the bronze medal in the Sumo-open weight women's event.
