= Sandra Köppen =

German judoka (born 1975)

Personal information
- Full name: Sandra Köppen-Zuckschwerdt
- Born: 15 May 1975 (age 51)
- Occupation: Judoka
- Height: 1.75 m (5 ft 9 in)
- Weight: 135 kg (298 lb)

Sport
- Country: Germany
- Sport: Judo, Sumo
- Weight class: +78 kg, Open

Achievements and titles
- Olympic Games: 5th (2000)
- World Champ.: (bronze) (2001, 2007)
- European Champ.: (gold) (2001, 2002)
Medal record
World Championships
Bronze medal – third place	2001 Munich	+78 kg
Bronze medal – third place	2007 Rio de Janeiro	+78 kg
European Championships
Gold medal – first place	2001 Paris	Open
Gold medal – first place	2002 Maribor	+78 kg
Bronze medal – third place	1998 Oviedo	+78 kg
Bronze medal – third place	1999 Bratislava	+78 kg
Bronze medal – third place	2003 Düsseldorf	+78 kg
European Junior Championships
Bronze medal – third place	1993 Arnhem	+72 kg
Women's sumo
World Games
Bronze medal – third place	2001 Akita	Heavyweight
Gold medal – first place	2005 Duisburg	Heavyweight

Profile at external databases
- IJF: 52728
- JudoInside.com: 251
- Updated on 4 March 2024

Sandra Köppen-Zuckschwerdt (born 15 May 1975 in Potsdam) is a German judoka.

She also won a gold medal in sumo wrestling at the 2005 World Games.

She has married her trainer Wolfgang Zuckschwerdt. Their daughter Marie-Luis Zuckschwerdt is a sumo wrestler.

== Achievements ==
Year	Tournament	Place	Weight class
2007	World Championships	3rd	Heavyweight (+78 kg)
2005	European Open Championships	5th	Open class
2003	World Championships	5th	Heavyweight (+78 kg)
2003	European Championships	3rd	Heavyweight (+78 kg)
2002	European Championships	1st	Heavyweight (+78 kg)
2001	World Championships	3rd	Heavyweight (+78 kg)
2001	European Championships	1st	Open class
2000	Olympic Games	5th	Heavyweight (+78 kg)
1999	European Championships	3rd	Heavyweight (+78 kg)
1998	European Championships	3rd	Heavyweight (+78 kg)
1997	World Championships	7th	Heavyweight (+72 kg)
1996	European Championships	5th	Open class
1995	World Championships	5th	Open class
1995	European Championships	5th	Open class
