= Sumo at the 2001 World Games – Women's heavyweight =

Sumo women's heavyweight at the 2001 World Games
- Venue: Tenno Town Gymnasium, Tenno, Akita, Japan
- Dates: 25 August 2001
- Competitors: 10 from 4 nations

Medalists
gold medal	(Russia) Olesya Kovalenko
silver medal	(Japan) Rie Tsuihiji
bronze medal	(Germany) Sandra Köppen

The women's heavyweight competition in sumo at the 2001 World Games took place on 25 August 2001 at the Tenno Town Gymnasium in Tenno, Akita, Japan.

== Competition format ==
A total of 10 athletes entered the competition. They fought in stepladder system.

== Results ==
=== Gold medal bracket ===
Round 1
(Japan) Miki Satoyama (JPN)	L
(Germany) Sandra Köppen (GER)	W
(Russia) Olesya Kovalenko (RUS)	W
(Estonia) Lea Meller (EST)	L

Quarterfinals
(Japan) Rie Tsuihiji (JPN)	W
(Estonia) Mille Sang (EST)	L
(Russia) Alina Choidan (RUS)	L
(Germany) Sandra Köppen (GER)	W
(Estonia) Kairi Kuur (EST)	W
(Japan) Eri Tanaka (JPN)	L
(Japan) Emi Asai (JPN)	L
(Russia) Olesya Kovalenko (RUS)	W

Semifinals
(Japan) Rie Tsuihiji (JPN)	W
(Germany) Sandra Köppen (GER)	L
(Estonia) Kairi Kuur (EST)	L
(Russia) Olesya Kovalenko (RUS)	W

Final
(Japan) Rie Tsuihiji (JPN)	L
(Russia) Olesya Kovalenko (RUS)	W

=== Bronze medal bracket ===
Round 1
(Japan) Miki Satoyama (JPN)	L
(Russia) Alina Choidan (RUS)	W
(Estonia) Lea Meller (EST)	W
(Japan) Eri Tanaka (JPN)	L

Round 2
(Estonia) Mille Sang (EST)	W
(Russia) Alina Choidan (RUS)	L
(Estonia) Kairi Kuur (EST)
Bye
(Germany) Sandra Köppen (GER)
Bye
(Japan) Emi Asai (JPN)	L
(Estonia) Lea Meller (EST)	W

Semifinal
(Estonia) Mille Sang (EST)	L
(Estonia) Kairi Kuur (EST)	W
(Germany) Sandra Köppen (GER)	W
(Estonia) Lea Meller (EST)	L

Bronze medal match
(Estonia) Kairi Kuur (EST)	L
(Germany) Sandra Köppen (GER)	W
