= Sumo at the 2005 World Games =

Sumo competition in Duisburg, Germany

- Venue: Landschaftspark Nord - Kraftzentrale
- Dates: 19–20 July 2005
- No. of events: 8
- Competitors: 54 from 15 nations

The sumo competition at the 2005 World Games took place from 19 to 20 July in Duisburg, Germany at the Landschaftspark Duisburg-Nord. This was the first time sumo was chosen to be an official sport at the World Games and as a result the medals were included in the official medal tally.

== Participating nations ==
- Australia (3)
- Brazil (5)
- Bulgaria (1)
- Cuba (1)
- France (3)
- Germany (6)
- Japan (10)
- Mauritius (3)
- Netherlands (1)
- New Zealand (2)
- Poland (2)
- Russia (6)
- South Africa (3)
- Ukraine (2)
- United States (6)

== Medal table ==
Rank	Nation	Gold	Silver	Bronze	Total
1	Japan	3	4	3	10
2	Russia	2	3	2	7
3	Ukraine	2	0	0	2
4	Germany	1	0	1	2
5	Poland	0	1	2	3
Totals (5 entries)		8	8	8	24

=== Men ===
Event	Gold	Silver	Bronze
Lightweight	Vitaliy Tikhenko; Ukraine	Igor Kurinnoy; Russia	Yuya Hanada; Japan
Middleweight	Katsuo Yoshida; Japan	Seietsu Hikage; Japan	David Tsallagov; Russia
Heavyweight	Keisho Shimoda; Japan	Takayuki Ichihara; Japan	Robert Paczków; Poland
Openweight	Takayuki Ichihara; Japan	Keisho Shimoda; Japan	Seietsu Hikage; Japan

=== Women ===
Event	Gold	Silver	Bronze
Lightweight	Alina Boykova; Ukraine	Ekaterina Salakhova; Russia	Tamami Iwai; Japan
Middleweight	Svetlana Panteleeva; Russia	Satomi Ishigaya; Japan	Nicole Hehemann; Germany
Heavyweight	Sandra Köppen; Germany	Olesya Kovalenko; Russia	Edyta Witkowska; Poland
Openweight	Olesya Kovalenko; Russia	Edyta Witkowska; Poland	Ekaterina Keyb; Russia
