= Shini-tai =

Sumo exception to losing rule

Shini-tai (死に体) is a term used in sumo wrestling. In general, the first sumo wrestler to touch any body part outside the ring, or have any part of his body other than the soles of his feet touch the ground loses. There are exceptions to the rule, shini-tai being one of them.

Literally meaning 'dead body' or 'dying body,' the term is used to describe a wrestler who was not first to fall or touch outside the ring, but who had no chance of winning owing to the superior technique of his opponent (and his falling position). Whilst a relatively rare event, it is most often seen after close bouts in which one wrestler clearly had the advantage towards the end.

For example, consider the case where one wrestler overpowered his opponent forcing him to the ground with himself on top. If the overpowering wrestler put his hand down to protect against injury (so-called kabai-te) before the wrestler underneath hit the ground, then the wrestler who was on top will still be judged the winner. This was seen in January 1972 when Kitanofuji was declared the winner over Takanohana despite putting his hand down first. Another example is where a strong wrestler pushes his opponent out of the ring with sufficient force that his opponent is still in the air at the time the winning rikishi steps outside because of his momentum. Alternatively, the wrestler who is on the offensive may lift his opponent and carry him out of the ring by tsuri-dashi, and will still be declared the winner even if he puts his foot out first, as long as his opponent's feet are both in the air and he is moving forward.

The gyōji makes a decision as to the winner, which the judges, or any of the waiting wrestlers around the ring, are entitled to challenge. (It is very rare for a wrestler to intervene.) If there is a challenge, the five judges step into the dohyō and have a mono-ii (talk about things) to discuss the match and the result.

Their options are to declare either a winner or a torinaoshi (replay). If declaring a winner, they can decide who fell out of the ring or touched the ground first, that one wrestler was a shinitai and therefore his opponent won, or declare one wrestler disqualified owing to use of an illegal technique.

Their explanation is usually that the winning wrestler used a specific technique to overpower his opponent and was in clear control of the match. They grant him the victory regardless of whether or not he touched the ground first.

By extension, this term is also a Japanese equivalent of the English idiom "lame duck".
