= Sumo at the 2001 World Games =

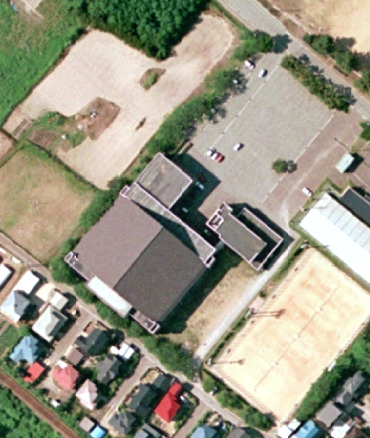
- Tenno Town Gymnasium
- Venue: Tenno Town Gymnasium
- Dates: 25–26 August 2001
- Competitors: 66 from 14 nations

Sumo was one of the invitational sports at the 2001 World Games in Akita and was played between 25 and 26 August. 66 athletes, from 14 nations, participated in the tournament. The sumo competition took place at Tenno Town Gymnasium.

== Participating nations ==
- Brazil (3)
- Chinese Taipei (4)
- Czech Republic (3)
- Estonia (6)
- Germany (6)
- Japan (12)
- Kazakhstan (3)
- Mongolia (4)
- Paraguay (3)
- Russia (6)
- Thailand (6)
- Tonga (4)
- United States (3)
- Uzbekistan (3)

== Medal table ==
Rank	Nation	Gold	Silver	Bronze	Total
1	Japan	4	2	2	8
2	Germany	2	3	1	6
3	Russia	2	0	3	5
4	Estonia	0	2	0	2
5	Mongolia	0	1	1	2
6	Czech Republic	0	0	1	1
Totals (6 entries)		8	8	8	24

== Events ==
=== Men's events ===
Event	Gold	Silver	Bronze
Lightweight	Chohei Kimura; Japan	Peer Schmidt-Düwiger; Germany	Lodoijamtsyn Bat-Erdene; Mongolia
Middleweight	Seietsu Hikage; Japan	Altangadasyn Khüchitbaatar; Mongolia	David Tsallagov; Russia
Heavyweight	Jörg Brümmer; Germany	Jüri Uustalu; Estonia	Takahisa Osanai; Japan
Openweight	Kenichi Yajima; Japan	Torsten Scheibler; Germany	Jaroslav Poříz; Czech Republic
Team	Japan	Germany	Russia

=== Women's events ===
Event	Gold	Silver	Bronze
Lightweight	Astrid Lixenfeld; Germany	Satomi Ishigaya; Japan	Natalia Bobkina; Russia
Heavyweight	Olesya Kovalenko; Russia	Rie Tsuihiji; Japan	Sandra Köppen; Germany
Team	Russia	Estonia	Japan
