= Sumo =

Japanese form of full-contact wrestling

- 相撲
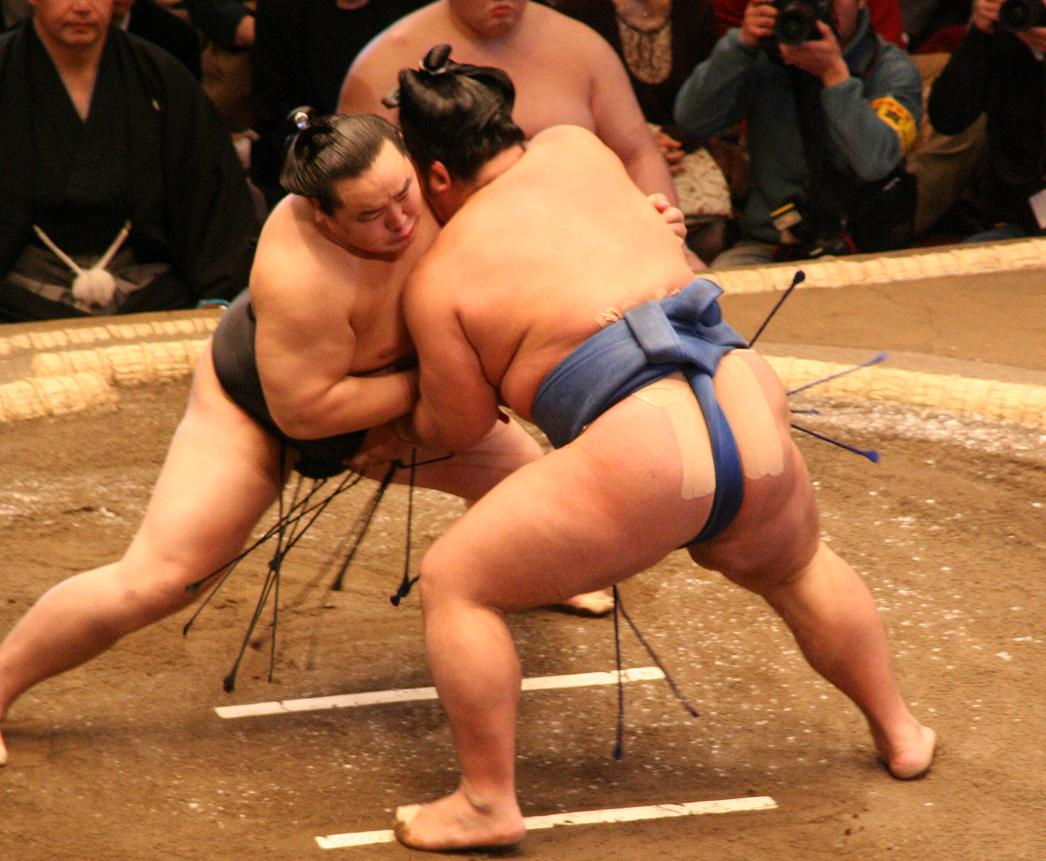
- A sumo match (tori-kumi) between yokozuna Asashōryū (left) and komusubi Kotoshōgiku in January 2008
- Focus: Clinch fighting
- Hardness: Full contact
- Country of origin: Japan
- Ancestor arts: Tegoi
- Olympic sport: No, but IOC recognized
- Official website: www.sumo.or.jp/En/

Sumo
- Highest governing body: International Sumo Federation (Amateur); Japan Sumo Association (Professional)
- First played: Japan, 7th century (antiquity); Japan, mid-17th century (Edo period, modern)

Characteristics
- Contact: Yes
- Team members: No
- Mixed-sex: Yes (Amateur, separate divisions); No (Professional, men only)
- Type: Grappling sport
- Equipment: Mawashi
- Venue: Dohyō
- Glossary: Glossary of sumo terms

Presence
- Country or region: Worldwide (Amateur); Japan (Professional)
- Olympic: No
- Paralympic: No
- World Games: 2001 (invitational); 2005–2022

Sumo
- "Sumo" in kanji

Japanese name
- Kanji: 相撲
- Hiragana: すもう
Transcriptions
- Revised Hepburn: sumō
- Kunrei-shiki: sumô

Sumo (Japanese: 相撲, Hepburn: sumō; pronounced [sɯmoː], lit. 'striking one another') is a form of competitive full-contact wrestling where a rikishi (wrestler) attempts to force his opponent out of a dohyō (circular ring) or into touching the ground with any body part other than the soles of his feet (usually by throwing, shoving or pushing him down).

Sumo originated in Japan, the only country where it is practised professionally and where it is considered the national sport. It is considered a gendai budō, which refers to modern Japanese martial arts, but the sport has a history spanning many centuries. Many ancient traditions have been preserved in sumo, and even today the sport includes many ritual elements, such as the use of salt purification, from Shinto.

Life as a wrestler is highly regimented, with rules regulated by the Japan Sumo Association. Most sumo wrestlers are required to live in communal sumo training stables, known in Japanese as heya, where all aspects of their daily lives – from meals to their manner of dress – are dictated by strict tradition. The lifestyle has a negative effect on their health, with sumo wrestlers having a much lower life expectancy than the average Japanese man.

From 2008 to 2016, a number of high-profile controversies and scandals rocked the sumo world, with an associated effect on its reputation and ticket sales. These have also affected the sport's ability to attract recruits. Despite this setback, sumo's popularity and general attendance has rebounded due to having multiple yokozuna (or grand champions) for the first time in a number of years and other high-profile wrestlers grabbing the public's attention.

== Etymology ==
The spoken word "sumō" goes back to the verb "sumau/sumafu", meaning 'compete' or 'fight' in Japanese. The written word goes back to the expression sumai no sechi (相撲の節), which was a wrestling competition at the imperial court during the Heian period. The characters from sumai, or sumō today, mean 'to strike each other'. There are instances of "sumo" alternatively being written with the kanji "角力", as in the Nihon Shoki. Here, the first character means 'corner', but serves as a phonetic element, as one reading of it is sumi, while the second character means 'power'.

Sumō is also a general term for wrestling in Japanese. For example, udezumō (腕相撲, 'arm sumō') means 'arm wrestling', and yubizumō (指相撲, 'finger sumō') means 'finger wrestling'. The professional sumo observed by the Japan Sumo Association is called ōzumō (大相撲), or 'grand sumo'.

== History ==
=== Antiquity (pre-1185) ===
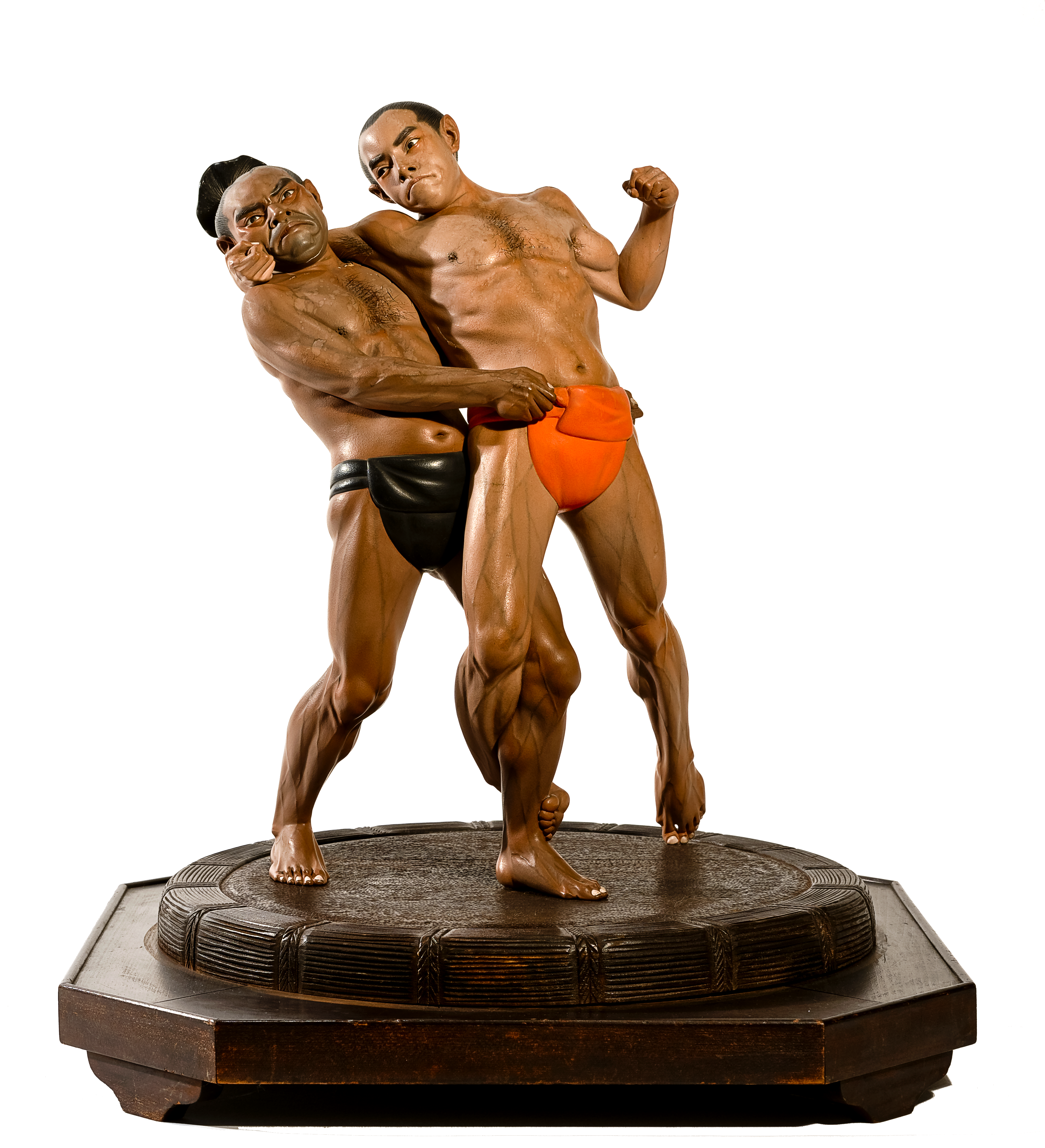
Japanese figure group entitled 'The Wrestlers' or 'Kawatso Saburo Overcoming Matano Goro'. The sculpture depicts Kawatso Saburo wrestling with Matano Goro during a famous sumo match of AD 1176. The pair are shown in the hold 'kawazu-gake' named after Saburo, the victor. This item is possibly a miniature example of Iki-ningyō (living dolls), the Japanese tradition of making life-sized life-like dolls which were popular in misemono (exhibitions) during the Edo period of Japan and showed dramatic historical scenes.

Prehistoric wall paintings indicate that sumo originated from an agricultural ritual dance performed in prayer for a good harvest. The first mention of sumo can be found in a Kojiki manuscript dating back to 712, which describes how possession of the Japanese islands was decided in a wrestling match between the kami known as Takemikazuchi and Takeminakata.

Takemikazuchi was a god of thunder, swordsmanship, and conquest, created from the blood that was shed when Izanagi slew the fire-demon Kagu-tsuchi. Takeminakata was a god of water, wind, agriculture and hunting, and a distant descendant of the storm-god Susanoo. When Takemikazuchi sought to conquer the land of Izumo, Takeminakata challenged him in hand-to-hand combat. In their melee, Takemikazuchi grappled Takeminakata's arm and crushed it "like a reed", defeating Takeminakata and claiming Izumo.

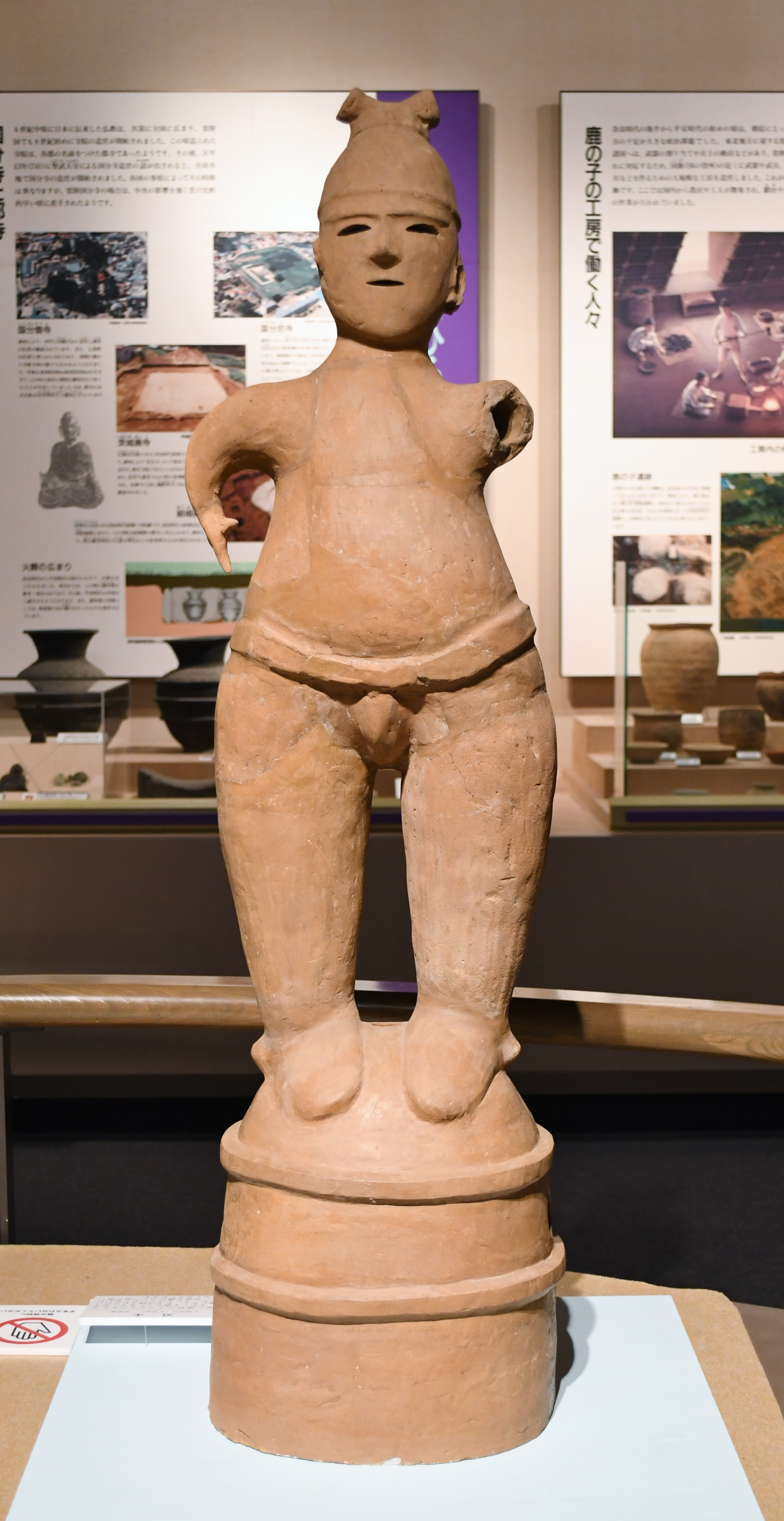
Haniwa sumo wrestler

The Nihon Shoki, published in 720, dates the first sumo match between mortals to the year 23 BC, when a man named Nomi no Sukune fought against Taima no Kuehaya at the request of Emperor Suinin and eventually killed him, making him the mythological ancestor of sumo. According to the Nihon Shoki, Nomi broke a rib of Taima with one kick, and killed him with a kick to the back as well. Until the Japanese Middle Ages, this unregulated form of wrestling was often fought to the death of one of the fighters. In the Kofun period (300–538), Haniwa of sumo wrestlers were made. The first historically attested sumo fights were held in 642 at the court of Empress Kōgyoku to entertain a Korean legation. In the centuries that followed, the popularity of sumo within the court increased its ceremonial and religious significance. Regular events at the Emperor's court, the sumai no sechie, and the establishment of the first set of rules for sumo fall into the cultural heyday of the Heian period.

=== Japanese Middle Ages (1185–1603) ===
With the collapse of the Emperor's central authority, sumo lost its importance in the court; during the Kamakura period, sumo was repurposed from a ceremonial struggle to a form of military combat training among samurai. By the Muromachi period, sumo had fully left the seclusion of the court and became a popular event for the masses, and among the daimyō it became common to sponsor wrestlers. Sumotori who successfully fought for a daimyō's favor were given generous support and samurai status. Oda Nobunaga, a particularly avid fan of the sport, held a tournament of 1,500 wrestlers in February 1578. Because several bouts were to be held simultaneously within Oda Nobunaga's castle, circular arenas were delimited to hasten the proceedings and to maintain the safety of the spectators. This event marks the invention of the dohyō, which would be developed into its current form up until the 18th century. The winner of Nobunaga's tournament was given a bow for being victorious and he began dancing to show the war-lord his gratitude.

=== Edo period (1603–1867) ===
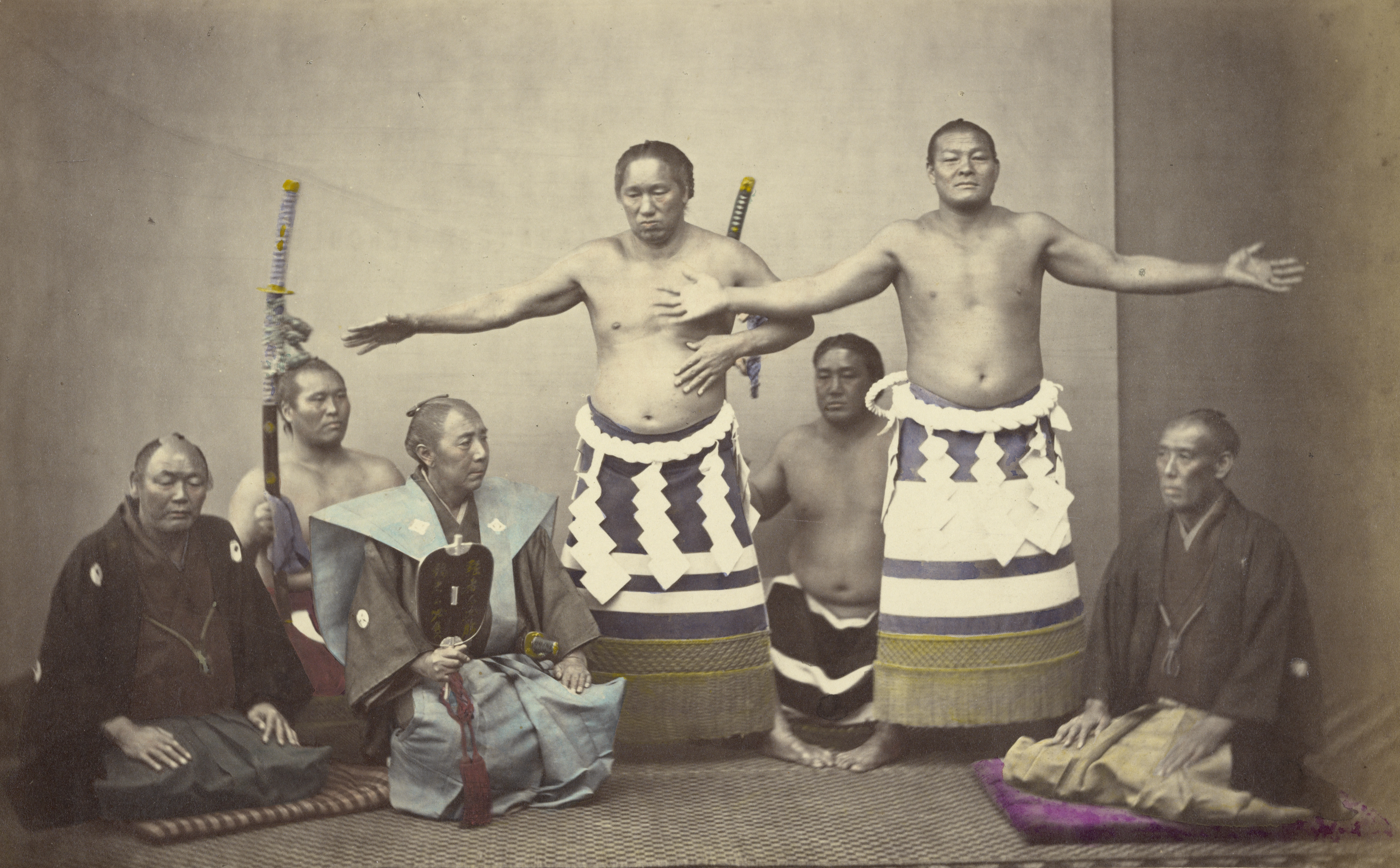
The 11th Yokozuna, Shiranui Kōemon and the 13th Yokozuna, Kimenzan Tanigorō (1866)

Because sumo had become a nuisance due to wild fighting on the streets, particularly in Edo, sumo was temporarily banned in the city during the Edo period. In 1684, sumo was permitted to be held for charity events on the property of Shinto shrines, as was common in Kyoto and Osaka. The first sanctioned tournament took place in the Tomioka Hachiman Shrine at this time. An official sumo organization was developed, consisting of professional wrestlers at the disposal of the Edo administration. Many elements date from this period, such as the dohyō-iri, the heya system, the gyōji and the mawashi. The 18th century brought forth several notable wrestlers such as Raiden Tameemon, Onogawa Kisaburō and Tanikaze Kajinosuke, the first historical yokozuna.

When Matthew C. Perry was shown sumo wrestling during his 1853 expedition to Japan, he found it distasteful and arranged a military showcase to display the merits of Western organization.

=== Since 1868 ===
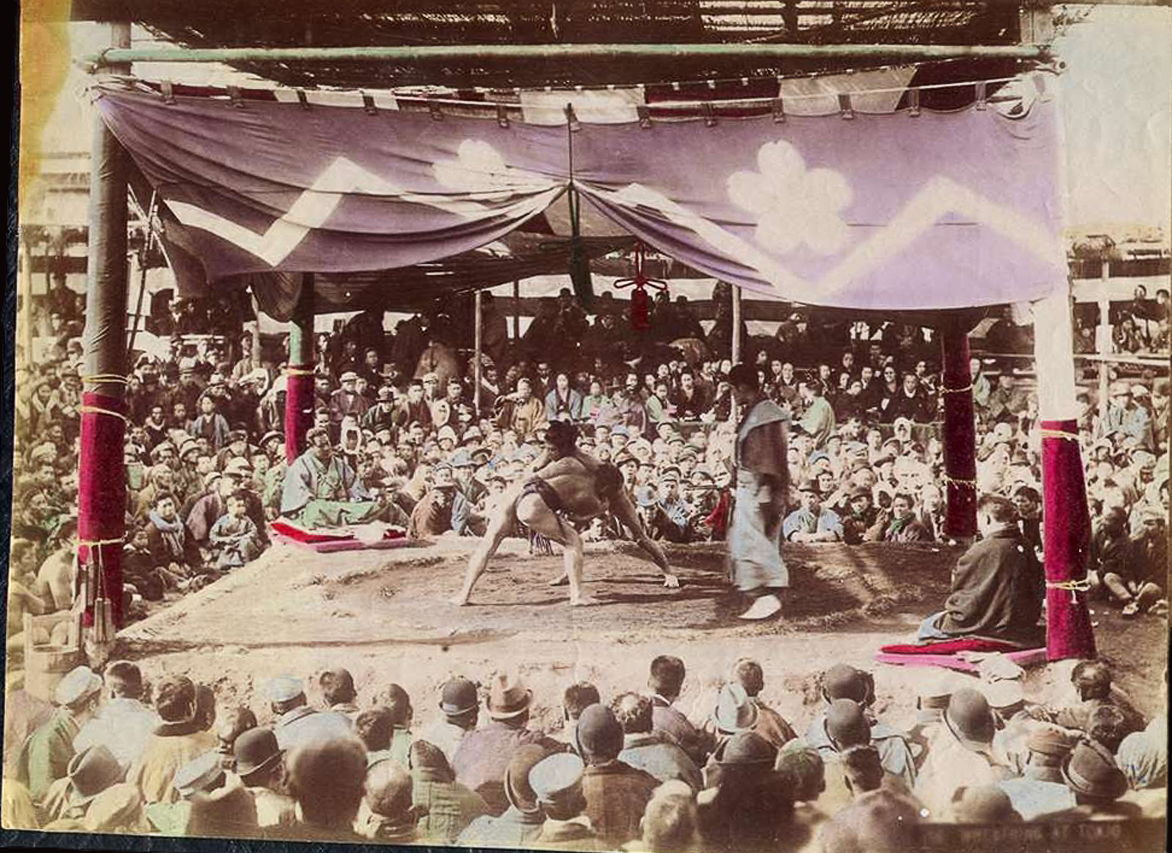
Sumo match in Tokyo c. 1890s

The Meiji Restoration of 1868 brought about the end of the feudal system, and with it the wealthy daimyō as sponsors. Due to a new fixation on Western culture, sumo had come to be seen as an embarrassing and backward relic, and internal disputes split the central association. The popularity of sumo was restored when Emperor Meiji organized a tournament in 1884; his example would make sumo a national symbol and contribute to nationalist sentiment following military successes against Korea and China. The Japan Sumo Association reunited on 28 December 1925 and increased the number of annual tournaments from two to four, and then to six in 1958. The length of tournaments was extended from ten to fifteen days in 1949.

Although exceptionally large wrestlers had long been celebrated – most famously the late-Edo ōzeki Raiden Tameemon (1767–1825), who reportedly stood 197 cm (6 ft 6 in) and weighed 169 kg (373 lb) – such physiques were unusual rather than typical, and woodblock prints from the pre-regulation era depict opponents of comparatively lean build. The institutional expectation that all professional wrestlers should be heavy emerged only in the late Meiji era. Around 1903, the influential Dewanoumi stable – then home to the 19th yokozuna Hitachiyama Taniemon – was inundated with new recruits and replaced individually prepared meals with communal hot pot dishes (chankonabe), both for kitchen efficiency and to support rapid weight gain. The practice spread rapidly to other stables, and over the 20th century the systematic pursuit of bulk became central to sumo training, accelerating particularly after World War II as Japanese diets shifted toward greater protein and caloric density. Reflecting this shift, the average weight of top division wrestlers continued to increase, from 125 kilograms (276 lb) in 1969 to over 150 kilograms (330 lb) by 1991, reaching a record 166 kilograms (366 lb) as of January 2019.

Gallery

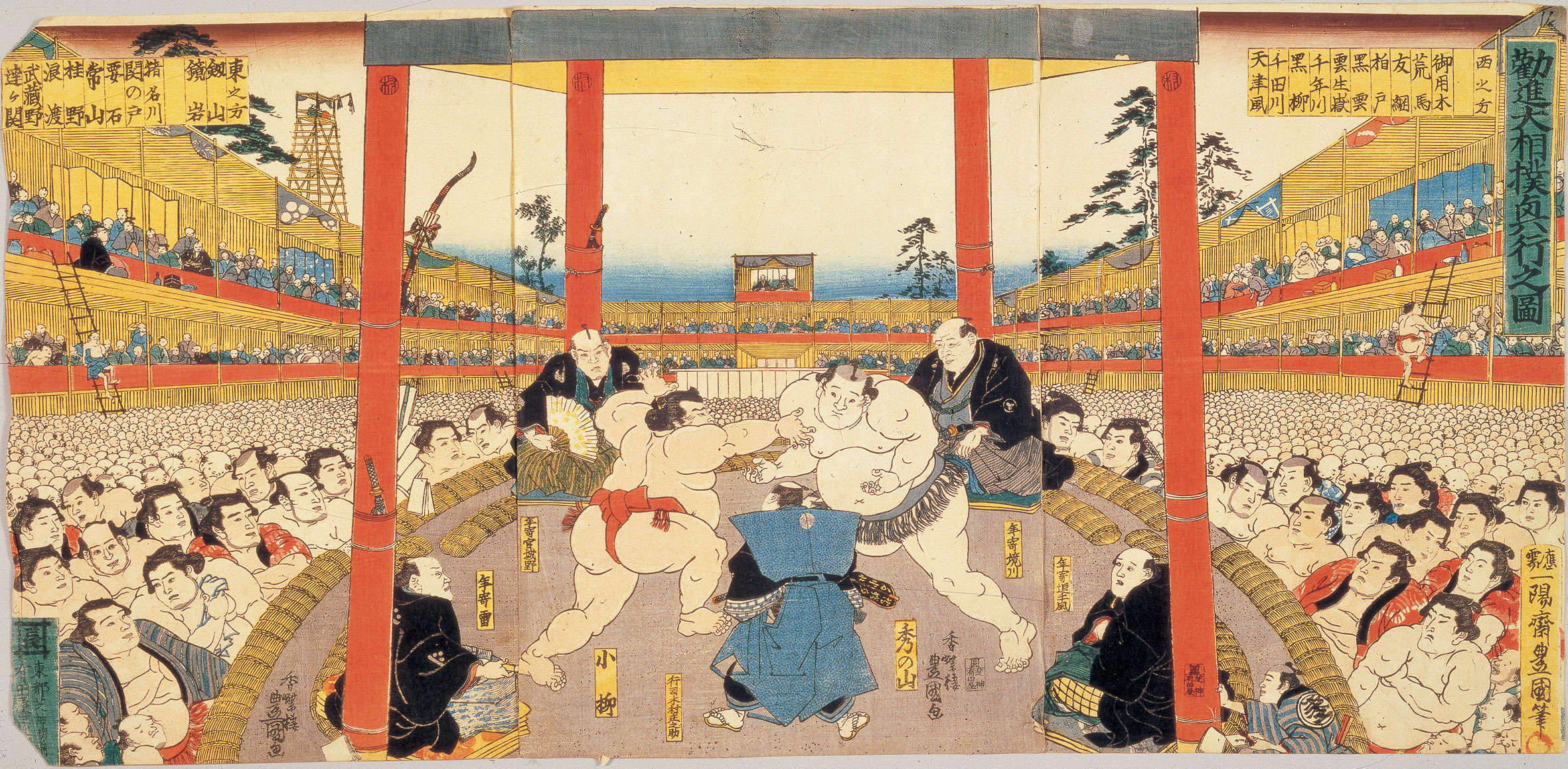
Kanjin Grand Sumo Tournament (c. 1843)

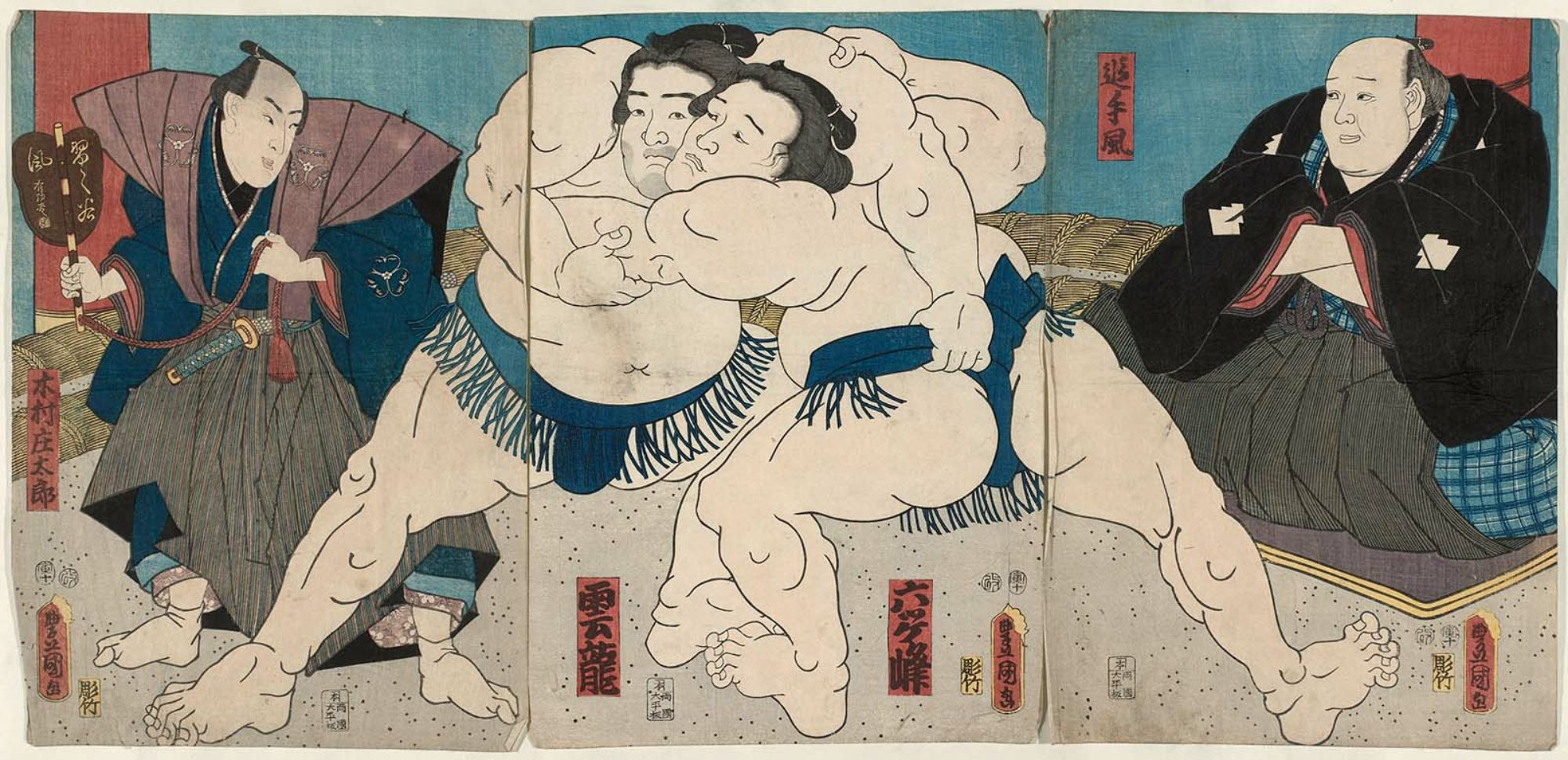
Sumo wrestling scene c. 1851

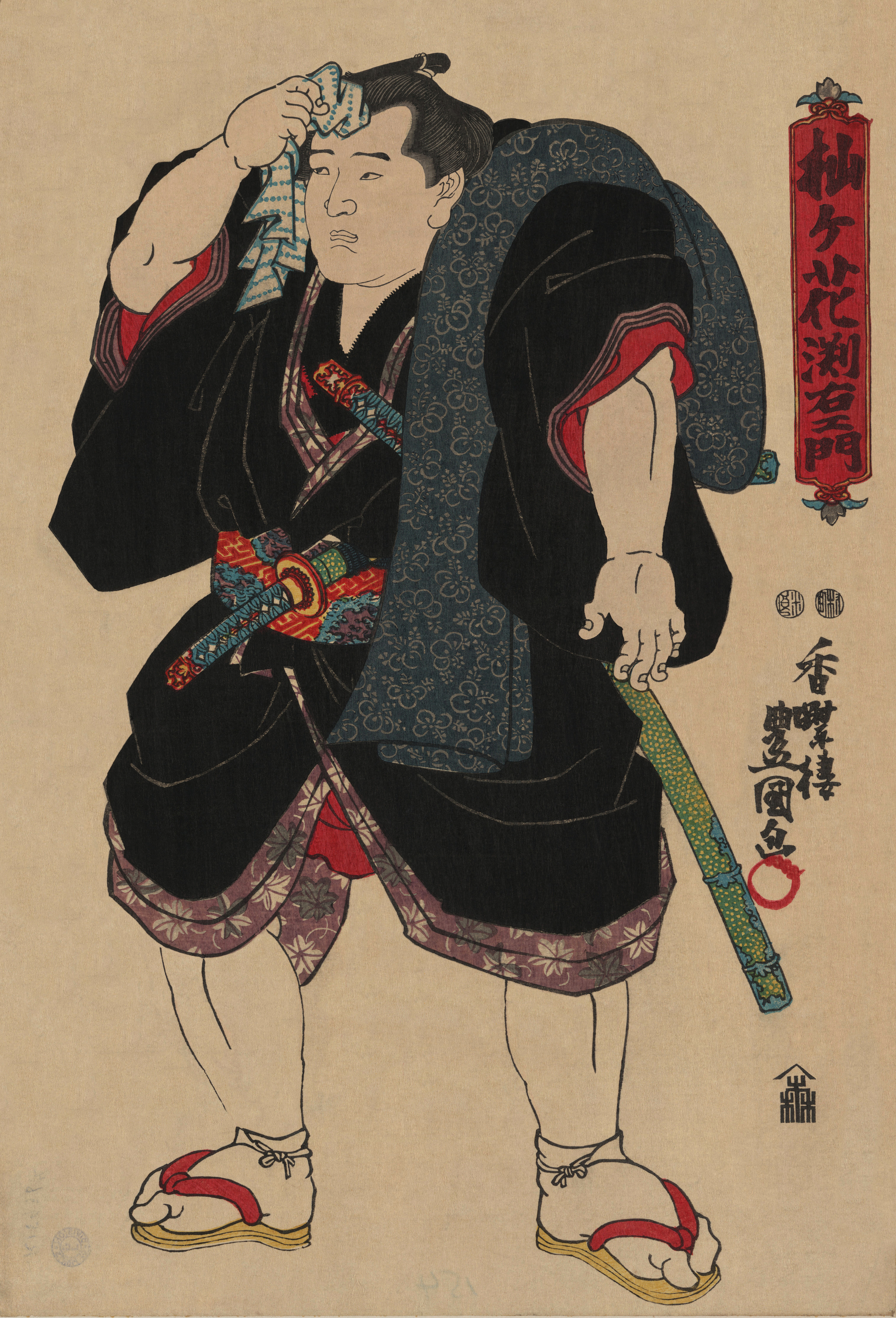
Somagahana Fuchiemon, c. 1850

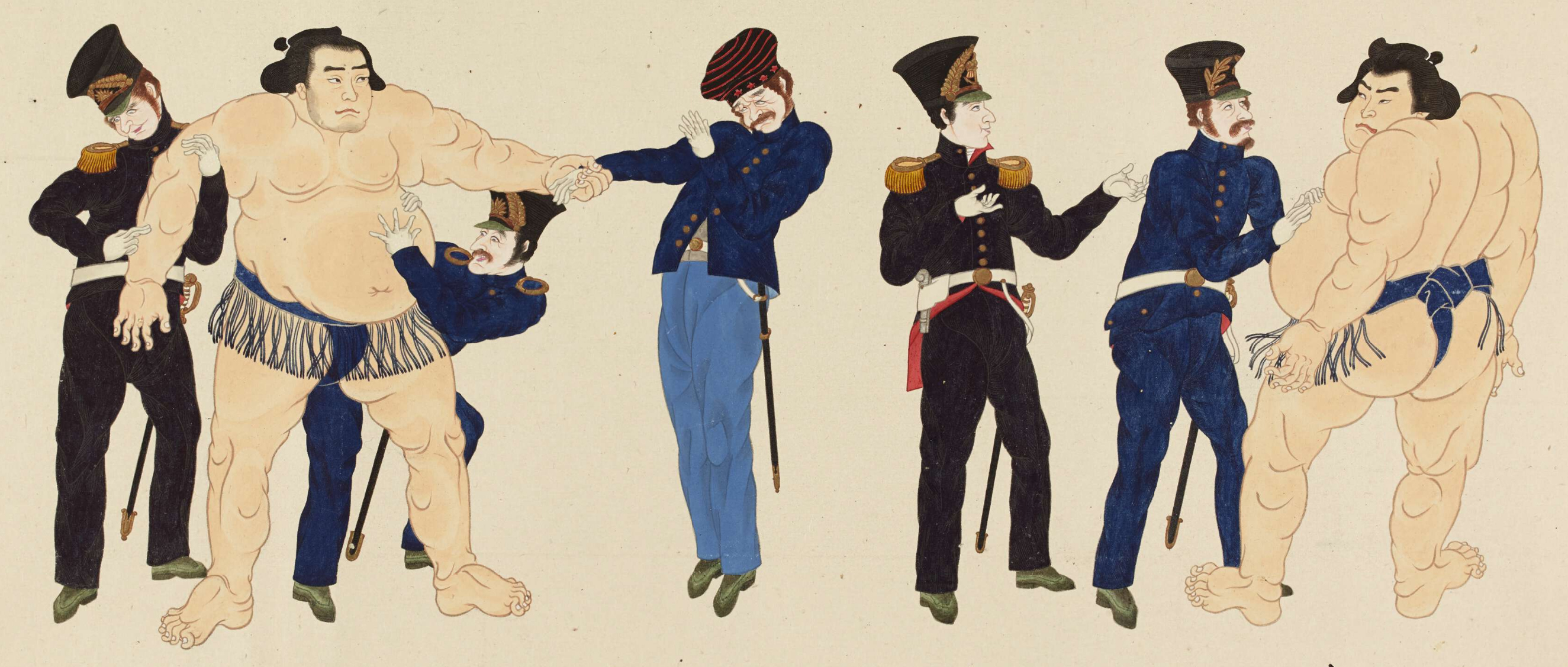
American sailors of the Perry Expedition examining a sumo wrestler (1854)

== Rules and customs ==
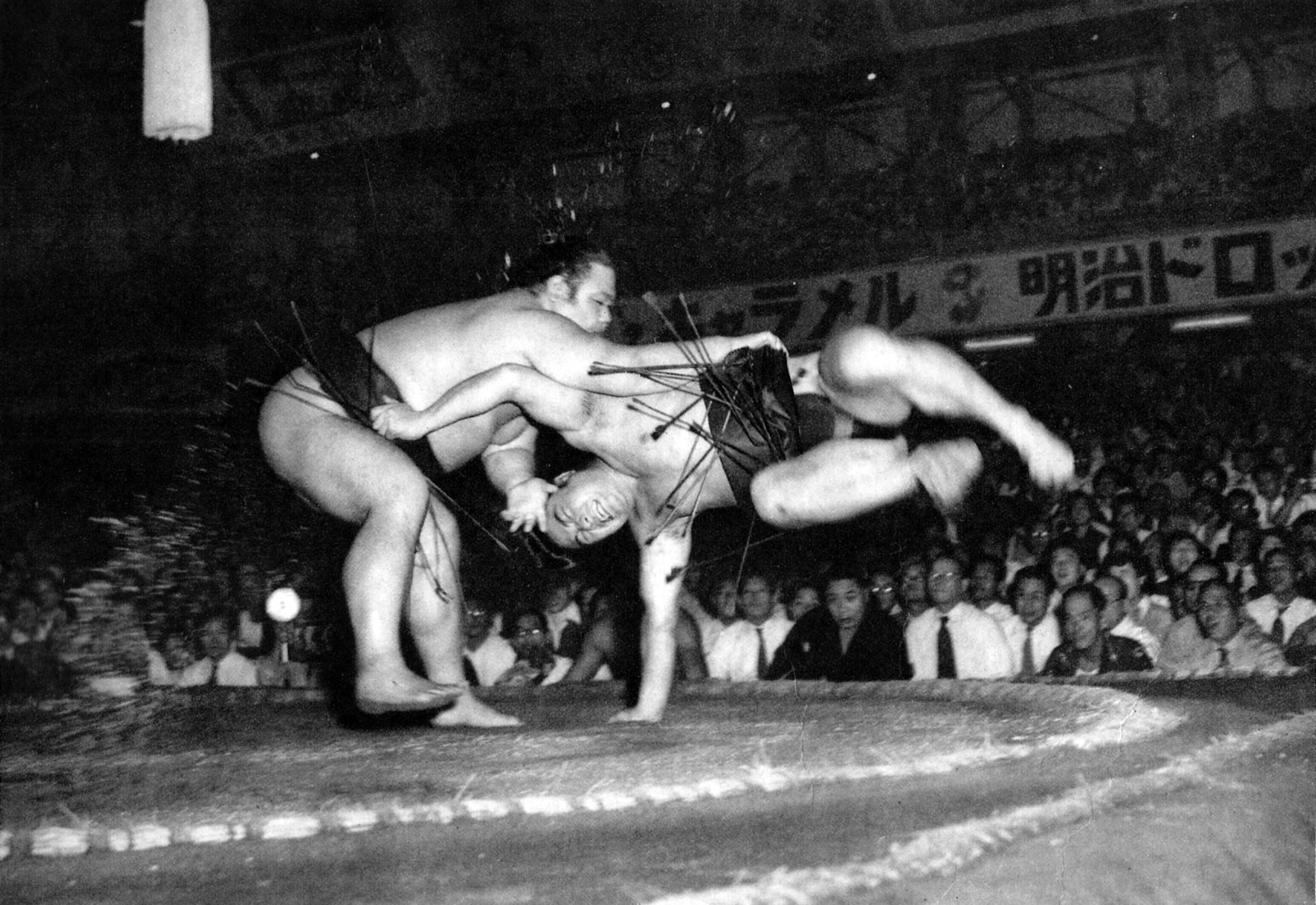
Azumafuji defeating Tochinishiki via the "overarm throw" (uwatenage) technique, 1953

The elementary principle of sumo is that a match is decided by a fighter first either being forced out of the dohyo (circular ring) (not necessarily having to touch the ground outside the ring with any part of the body; see Shini-tai), or touching the ground inside the ring with any part of the body other than the soles of the feet. The wrestlers try to achieve this by pushing, tossing, striking and often by outwitting the opponent. The Japan Sumo Association currently distinguishes 82 kimarite (winning techniques), some of which come from judo. The most common basic forms are grabbing the opponent by the mawashi (belt) and then forcing him out, a style called yotsu-zumō (四つ相撲), or pushing the opponent out of the ring without a firm grip, a style called oshi-zumō (押し相撲). Illegal moves are called kinjite, which include strangulation, hair-pulling, bending fingers, gripping the crotch area, kicking, poking eyes, punching and simultaneously striking both the opponent's ears.

The dohyō, which is constructed and maintained by the yobidashi (ring attendant), consists of a raised pedestal on which a circle 15 shaku (unit of distance equivalent to 4.55 m (14.9 ft) in diameter) is delimited by a series of rice-straw bales. In the middle of the circle there are two starting lines (shikiri-sen), behind which the wrestlers line up for the tachi-ai (the synchronized charge that initiates the match). The direction of the match is incumbent on the gyōji, a referee who is supported by five shimpan (judges). In some situations, a review of the gyōji's decision may be needed. The shimpan may convene a conference in the middle of the ring, called a mono-ii. This is done if the judges decide that the decision over who won the bout needs to be reviewed; for example, if both wrestlers appear to touch the ground or step out of the ring at the same time. In these cases, sometimes video is reviewed to see what happened. Once a decision is made, the chief judge will announce the decision to the spectators and the wrestlers alike. They may order a bout to be restarted, or leave the decision as given by the gyōji. Occasionally the shimpan will overrule the gyōji and give the bout to the other wrestler. On rare occasions the referee or judges may award the win to the wrestler who touched the ground first. This happens if both wrestlers touch the ground at nearly the same time and it is decided that the wrestler who touched the ground second had no chance of winning, his opponent's superior sumo having put him in an irrecoverable position. The losing wrestler is referred to as being shini-tai (dead body) in this case.

The maximum length of a match varies depending on the division. In the top division, the limit is four minutes, although matches usually only last a few seconds. If the match has not yet ended after the allotted time has elapsed, a mizu-iri (water break) is taken, after which the wrestlers continue the fight from their previous positions. If a winner is still not found after another four minutes, the fight restarts from the tachi-ai after another mizu-iri. If this still does not result in a decision, the outcome is considered a hikiwake (draw). This is an extremely rare result, with the last such draw being called in September 1974.

A special attraction of sumo is the variety of observed ceremonies and rituals, some of which have been cultivated in connection with the sport and unchanged for centuries. These include the ring-entering ceremonies (dohyō-iri) at the beginning of each tournament day, in which the wrestlers appear in the ring in elaborate kesho-mawashi (ceremonial dress), but also such details as the tossing of salt into the ring by the wrestlers, which serves as a symbolic cleansing of the ring, and rinsing the mouth with chikara-mizu (力水, power water) before a fight, which is similar to the ritual before entering a Shinto shrine. Additionally, before a match begins the two wrestlers perform and repeat a warm up routine called shikiri. The top division is given four minutes for shikiri, while the second division is given three, after which the timekeeping judge signals to the gyōji that time is up.

Traditionally, sumo wrestlers are renowned for their great girth and body mass, which is often a winning factor in sumo. No weight divisions are used in professional sumo; a wrestler can sometimes face an opponent twice his own weight. However, with superior technique, smaller wrestlers can control and defeat much larger opponents.

== Professional sumo ==
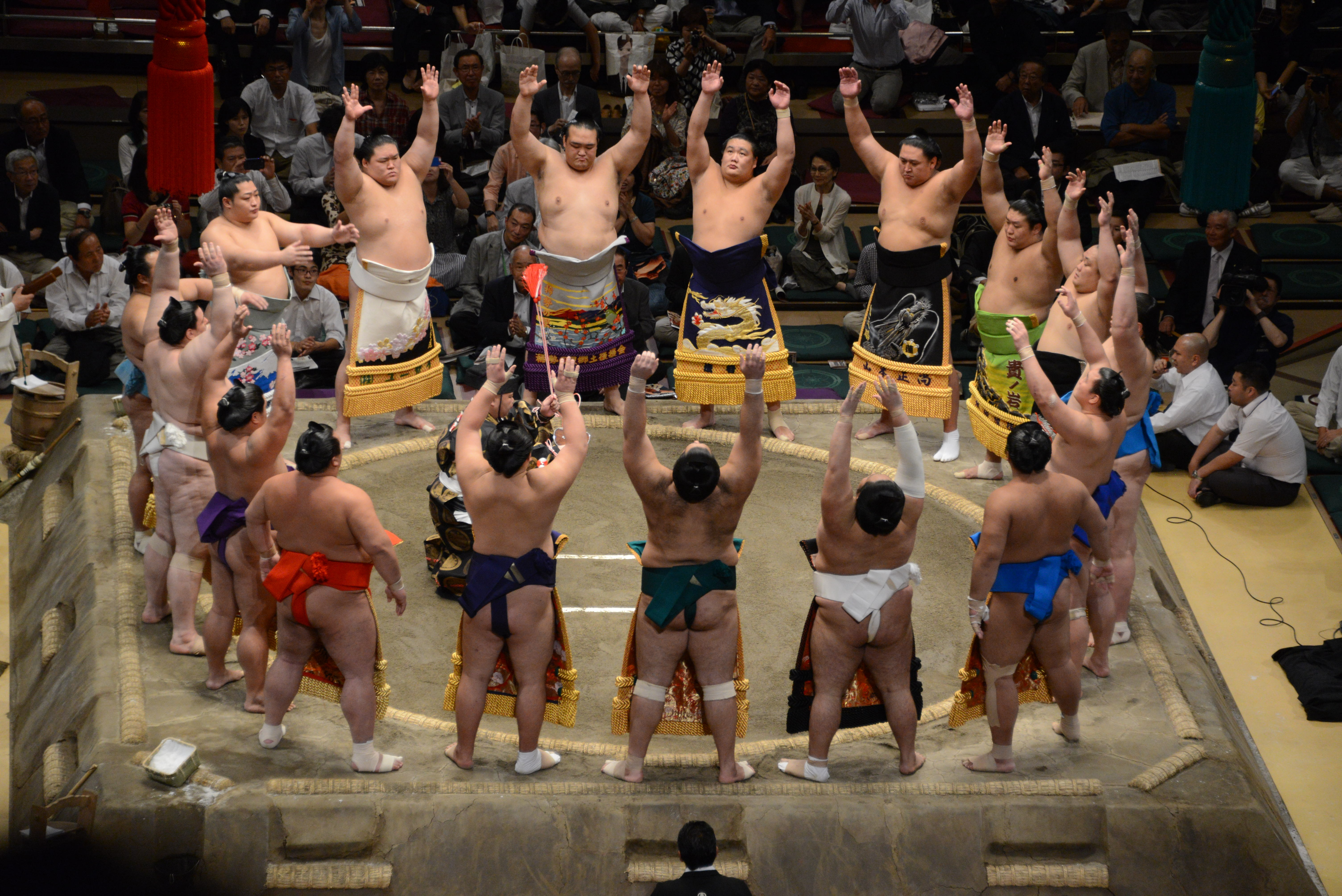
Sumo wrestlers gather in a circle around the gyōji (referee) in the dohyō-iri (ring-entering ceremony) (2014)

Professional sumo is organized by the Japan Sumo Association. It is called Ōzumō (大相撲, Grand Sumo). The members of the association, called oyakata, are all former wrestlers, and are the only people entitled to train new wrestlers. All professional wrestlers must be a member of a training stable, called heya, run by one of the oyakata, who is the stablemaster for the wrestlers under him. In 2007, 43 training stables hosted 660 wrestlers.

To become a professional, wrestlers must have completed at least nine years of compulsory education and meet minimum height and weight requirements. In 1994, the Japanese Sumo Association required that all sumo wrestlers be a minimum 173 cm (5 ft 8 in) in height. This prompted 16-year-old Takeji Harada of Japan (who had failed six previous eligibility tests) to have four separate cosmetic surgeries over a period of 12 months to add an extra 15 cm (6 in) of silicone to his scalp, which created a large, protruding bulge on his head. In response to this, the JSA stated that they would no longer accept aspiring wrestlers who surgically enhanced their height, citing health concerns. In 2019, The Japan Times reported that the height requirement was 167 cm (5 ft 6 in), and the weight requirement was 67 kg (148 lb), although they also claimed that a "blind eye" is turned for those "just shy" of the minimums. In 2023 the Sumo Association loosened the height and weight requirements, announcing that prospective recruits not meeting the minimums could still enter sumo by passing a physical fitness exam.

All sumo wrestlers take wrestling names called shikona (四股名), which may or may not be related to their real names. Often, wrestlers have little choice in their names, which are given to them by their stablemasters, or by a supporter or family member who encouraged them into the sport. This is particularly true of foreign-born wrestlers. A wrestler may change his wrestling name during his career, with some changing theirs several times.

Professional sumo wrestling has a strict hierarchy based on sporting merit. The wrestlers are ranked according to a system that dates back to the Edo period. They are promoted or demoted according to their performance in six official tournaments held throughout the year, called honbasho. A carefully prepared banzuke (ranking document) listing the full hierarchy is published two weeks prior to each sumo tournament.

In addition to the professional tournaments, exhibition competitions are held at regular intervals every year in Japan, and roughly once every two years, the top-ranked wrestlers visit a foreign country for such exhibitions. None of these displays are taken into account in determining a wrestler's future rank. Rank is determined only by performance in grand sumo tournaments.

=== Sumo divisions ===
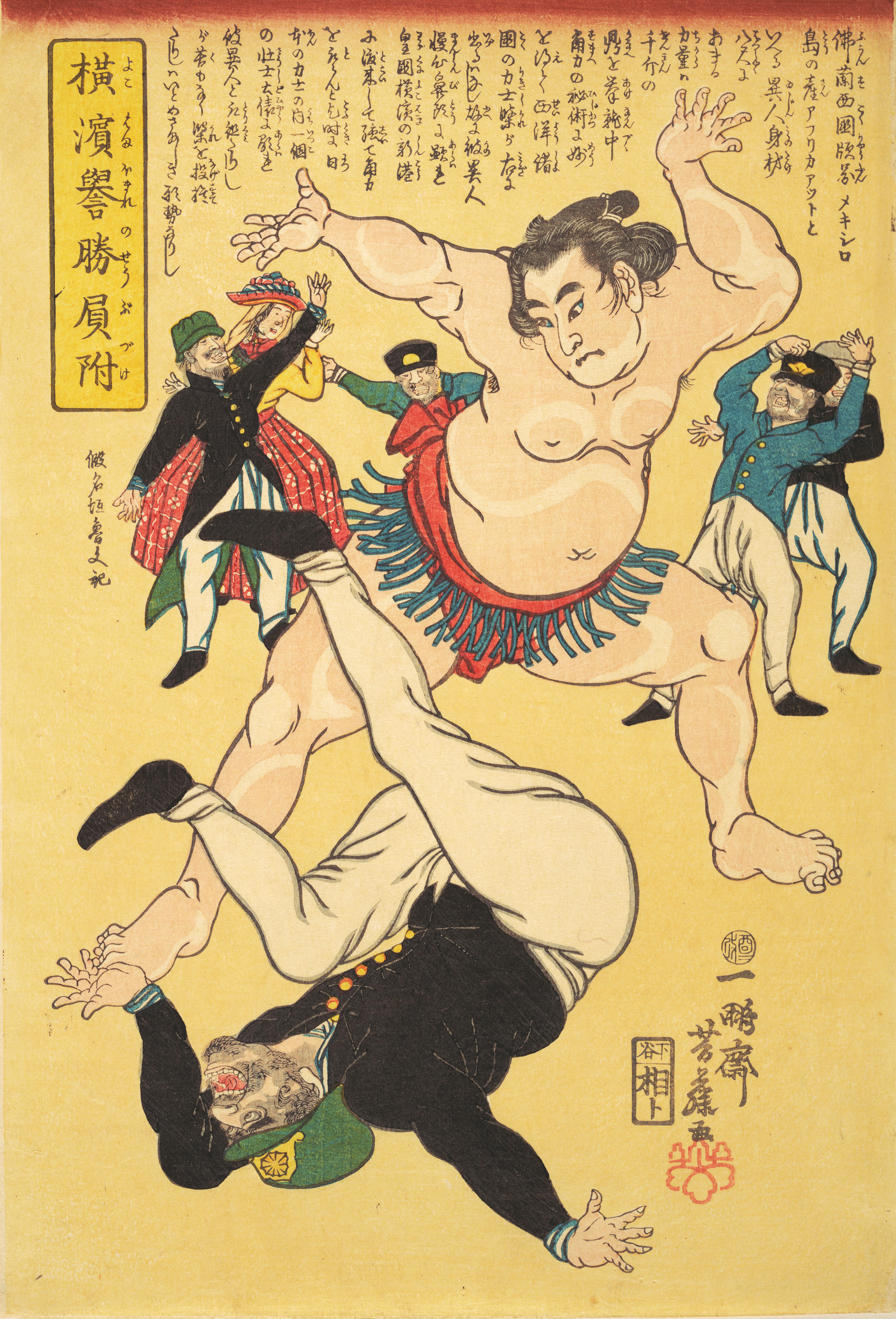
Foreigner and sumo wrestler, 1861

The six divisions in sumo, in descending order of prestige, are:

1. makuuchi (幕内) or makunouchi (幕の内). Maximum 42 wrestlers; Further divided into five ranks
2. jūryō (十両). Fixed at 28 wrestlers
3. makushita (幕下). Fixed at 120 wrestlers
4. sandanme (三段目). Fixed at 180 wrestlers
5. jonidan (序二段). About 200 wrestlers
6. jonokuchi (序ノ口 or 序の口). Around 50 wrestlers

Wrestlers enter sumo in the lowest division called jonokuchi and, ability permitting, work their way up to the top division. A broad demarcation in the sumo world can be seen between the wrestlers in the top two divisions known as sekitori (関取) and those in the four lower divisions, known commonly by the more generic term rikishi (力士). The ranks receive different levels of compensation, privileges, and status.

The topmost makuuchi division receives the most attention from fans and has the most complex hierarchy. The majority of wrestlers in the makuuchi division are maegashira (前頭) and are ranked from the highest level 1 down to about 16 or 17. In each rank are two wrestlers; the higher rank is designated as "east" and the lower as "west", so the list goes #1 east, #1 west, #2 east, #2 west, etc. Above the maegashira are the four champion or titleholder ranks, called the san'yaku, which are only numbered if the number of wrestlers in each rank exceeds two. These are, in descending order of prestige:

1. yokozuna (横綱)
2. ōzeki (大関)
3. sekiwake (関脇)
4. komusubi (小結)

At the pinnacle of the ranking system is the rank of yokozuna, or grand champions. They are generally expected to compete for and to win the top division tournament title on a regular basis, hence the promotion criteria for yokozuna are very strict. In general, an ōzeki must win the championship for two consecutive tournaments or an "equivalent performance" to be considered for promotion to yokozuna. More than one wrestler can hold the rank of yokozuna at the same time.

In antiquity, sumo was solely a Japanese sport. Since the 1900s, however, the number of foreign-born sumo wrestlers has gradually increased. In the beginning of this period, these few foreign wrestlers were listed as Japanese, but particularly since the 1960s, a number of high-profile foreign-born wrestlers became well-known, and in more recent years have even come to dominate in the highest ranks. Since January 2009, five of the nine wrestlers promoted to ōzeki have been foreign-born, and a Japanese had not been named yokozuna since 1998 until the promotion of Kisenosato Yutaka in 2017. This eventually led the Sumo Association to limit the number of foreigners allowed to a maximum of one in each stable.

=== Women and sumo ===
Women are not allowed to compete in professional sumo. They are also not allowed to enter the wrestling ring (dohyō), a tradition stemming from Shinto and Buddhist beliefs that women are "impure" because of menstrual blood.

A form of female sumo (女相撲, onnazumo) existed in some parts of Japan before professional sumo was established. The 2018 film The Chrysanthemum and the Guillotine depicts female sumo wrestlers at the time of civil unrest following the 1923 Great Kantō earthquake.

== Professional sumo tournaments ==
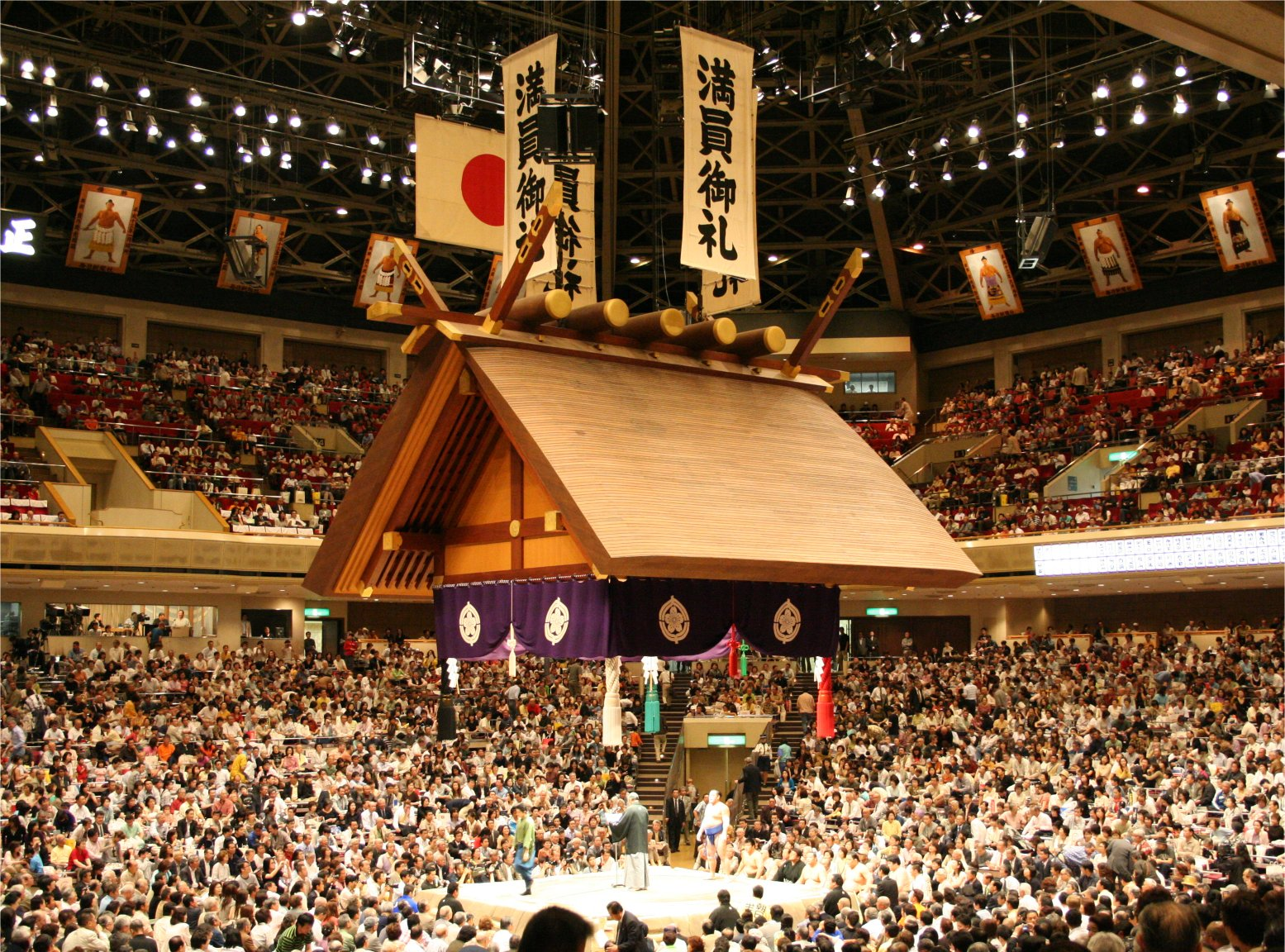
The sumo hall of Ryōgoku in Tokyo during the May 2006 tournament

Since 1958, six Grand Sumo tournaments or honbasho have been held each year: three at the Kokugikan in Tokyo (January, May, and September), and one each in Osaka (March), Nagoya (July), and Fukuoka (November). Until the end of 1984, the Kokugikan was located in Kuramae, Tokyo, but moved in 1985 to the newly built venue at Ryōgoku. Each tournament begins on a Sunday and runs for 15 days, ending also on a Sunday, roughly in the middle of the month. The tournaments are organized in a manner akin to a McMahon system tournament; each wrestler in the top two divisions (sekitori) has one match per day, while the lower-ranked wrestlers compete in seven bouts, about one every two days.

Each day is structured so that the highest-ranked contestants compete at the end of the day. Thus, wrestling starts in the morning with the jonokuchi wrestlers and ends at around six o'clock in the evening with bouts involving the yokozuna. The wrestler who wins the most matches over the 15 days wins the tournament championship (yūshō) for his division. If two wrestlers are tied for the top, they wrestle each other and the winner takes the title. Three-way ties for a championship are rare, at least in the top division. In these cases, the three wrestle each other in pairs with the first to win two in a row taking the tournament. More complex systems for championship playoffs involving four or more wrestlers also exist, but these are usually only seen in determining the winner of one of the lower divisions.

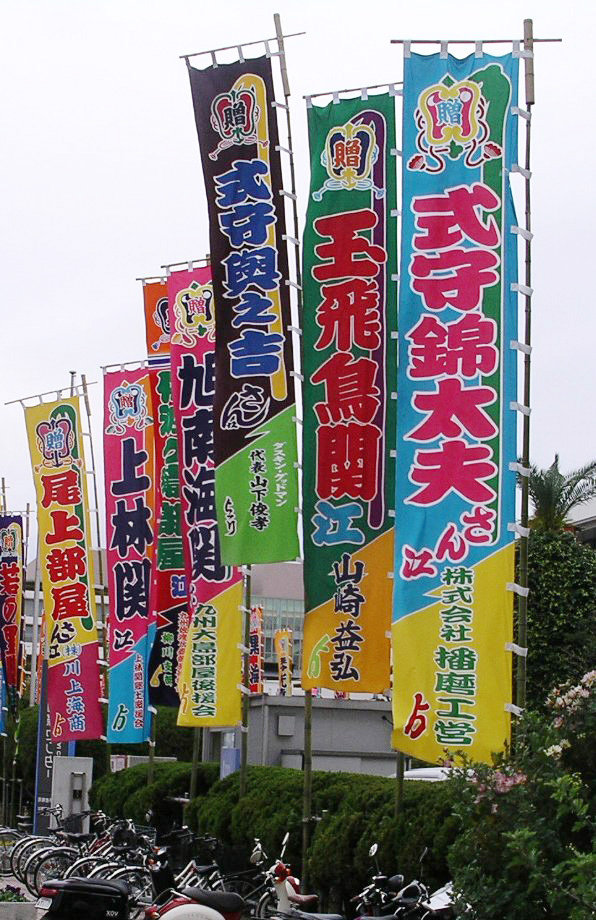
Sumo nobori flags in Fukuoka, 2006

The matchups for each day of the tournament are determined by the sumo elders who are members of the judging division of the Japan Sumo Association. They meet every morning at 11 am and announce the following day's matchups around 12 pm. An exception are the final day 15 matchups, which are announced much later on day 14. Each wrestler only competes against a selection of opponents from the same division, though small overlaps can occur between two divisions. The first bouts of a tournament tend to be between wrestlers who are within a few ranks of each other. Afterwards, the selection of opponents takes into account a wrestler's prior performance. For example, in the lower divisions, wrestlers with the same record in a tournament are generally matched up with each other and the last matchups often involve undefeated wrestlers competing against each other, even if they are from opposite ends of the division. In the top division, in the last few days, wrestlers with exceptional records often have matches against much more highly ranked opponents, including san'yaku wrestlers, especially if they are still in the running for the top division championship. Similarly, more highly ranked wrestlers with very poor records may find themselves fighting wrestlers much further down the division.

For the yokozuna and ōzeki, the first week and a half of the tournament tends to be taken up with bouts against the top maegashira, komusubi, and sekiwake, with the bouts within these ranks being concentrated into the last five days or so of the tournament (depending on the number of top-ranked wrestlers competing). Traditionally, on the final day, the last three bouts of the tournament are between the top six ranked wrestlers, with the top two competing in the final matchup, unless injuries during the tournament prevent this.

Certain match-ups are prohibited in regular tournament play. Wrestlers who are from the same training stable cannot compete against each other, nor can wrestlers who are brothers, even if they join different stables. The one exception to this rule is that training stable partners and brothers can face each other in a championship-deciding playoff match.

The last day of the tournament is called senshūraku, which literally means "the pleasure of a thousand autumns". This colorful name for the culmination of the tournament echoes the words of the playwright Zeami to represent the excitement of the decisive bouts and the celebration of the victor. The Emperor's Cup is presented to the wrestler who wins the top-division makuuchi championship. Numerous other (mostly sponsored) prizes are also awarded to him. These prizes are often rather elaborate, ornate gifts, such as giant cups, decorative plates, and statuettes. Others are quite commercial, such as one trophy shaped like a giant Coca-Cola bottle.

Promotion and relegation for the next tournament are determined by a wrestler's score over the 15 days. In the top division, the term kachi-koshi means a score of 8–7 or better, as opposed to make-koshi, which indicates a score of 7–8 or worse. A wrestler who achieves kachi-koshi almost always is promoted further up the ladder, the level of promotion being higher for better scores. See the makuuchi article for more details on promotion and relegation.

A top-division wrestler who is not an ōzeki or yokozuna and who finishes the tournament with kachi-koshi is also eligible to be considered for one of the three prizes awarded for "technique", "fighting spirit", and defeating the most yokozuna and ōzeki the "outstanding performance" prize. For more information see sanshō.

For the list of upper divisions champions since 1909, refer to the list of top division champions and the list of second division champions.

=== A professional sumo bout ===
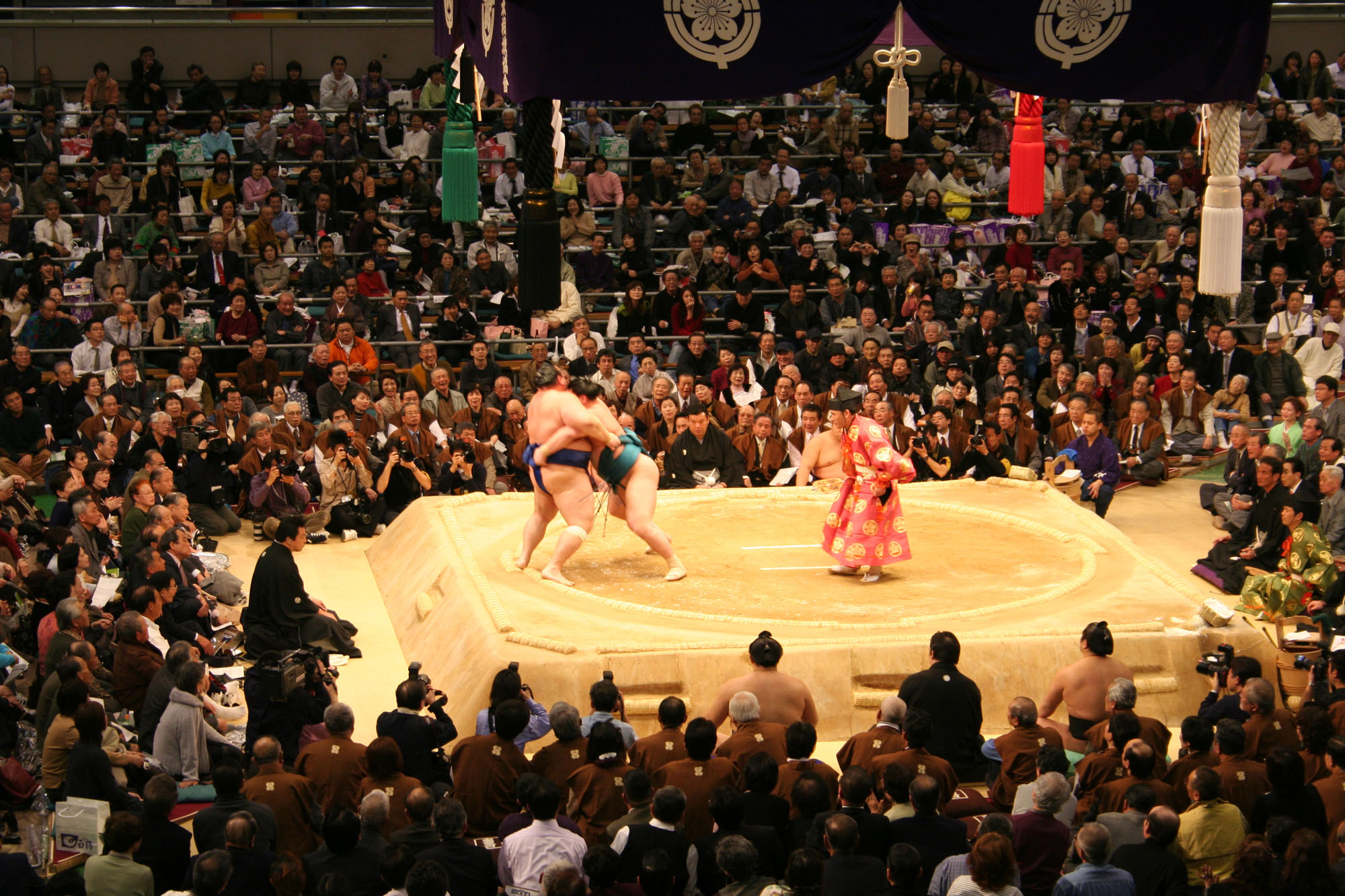
Sumo wrestlers at the Grand Tournament in Osaka, March 2006

At the initial charge, both wrestlers must jump up from the crouch simultaneously after touching the surface of the ring with two fists at the start of the bout. The referee (gyōji) can restart the bout if this simultaneous touch does not occur.

Upon completion of the bout, the referee must immediately designate his decision by pointing his gunbai or war-fan towards the winning side. The winning technique (kimarite) used by the winner would then be announced to the audience. The wrestlers then return to their starting positions and bow to each other before retiring.

Sumo fight at the Kokugikan in Tokyo, Japan, September 2014

The referee's decision is not final and may be disputed by the five judges seated around the ring. If this happens, they meet in the center of the ring to hold a mono-ii (a talk about things). After reaching a consensus, they can uphold or reverse the referee's decision or order a rematch, known as a torinaoshi.

A winning wrestler in the top division may receive additional prize money in envelopes from the referee if the matchup has been sponsored. If a yokozuna is defeated by a lower-ranked wrestler, it is common and expected for audience members to throw their seat cushions into the ring (and onto the wrestlers), though this practice is technically prohibited.

In contrast to the time in bout preparation, bouts are typically very short, usually less than a minute (most of the time only a few seconds). Extremely rarely, a bout can go on for several minutes.

=== Controversies ===
Controversies in professional sumo include match-fixing, gambling and yakuza ties, hazing, and the negative health effects of excessive body weight.

=== Exhibition ===
Exhibition tournaments are occasionally held inside and outside Japan. Such as in 1991 at the Royal Albert Hall in London, which Hokutoumi Nobuyoshi won. A return appearance is currently scheduled for October 17, 2025.

== Life as a professional sumo wrestler ==
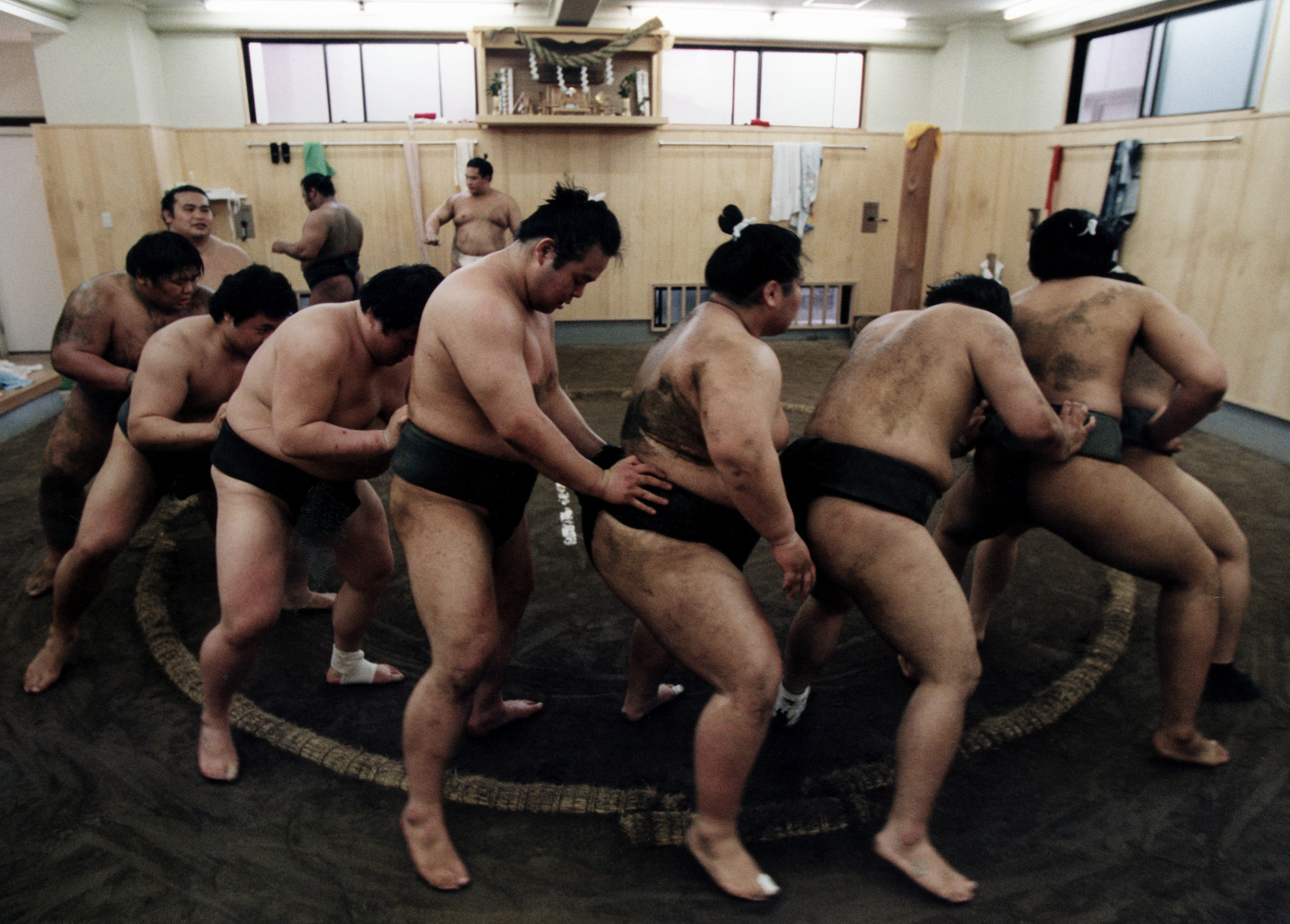
Young low-ranking sumo wrestlers at the Tomozuna Stable in Tokyo end their daily workout routine with a footwork drill (1998)

=== Daily life ===
A professional sumo wrestler leads a highly regimented way of life. The Sumo Association prescribes the behavior of its wrestlers in some detail. For example, the association prohibits wrestlers from driving cars, although this is partly out of necessity as many wrestlers are too big to fit behind a steering wheel. Breaking the rules can result in fines and/or suspension for both the offending wrestler and his stablemaster.

On entering sumo, they are expected to grow their hair long to form a topknot, or chonmage, similar to the samurai hairstyles of the Edo period. Furthermore, they are expected to wear the chonmage and traditional Japanese dress when in public, allowing them to be identified immediately as wrestlers. In recent years, however, this rule has been enforced less strictly than before. The type and quality of the dress depends on the wrestler's rank. Rikishi in jonidan and below are allowed to wear only a thin cotton robe called a yukata, even in winter. Furthermore, when outside, they must wear a form of wooden sandal called geta. Wrestlers in the makushita and sandanme divisions can wear a form of traditional short overcoat over their yukata and are allowed to wear straw sandals, called zōri. The higher-ranked sekitori can wear silk robes of their own choice, and the quality of the garb is significantly improved. They also are expected to wear a more elaborate form of topknot called an ōichō (big ginkgo leaf) on formal occasions.

Similar distinctions are made in stable life. The junior wrestlers must get up earliest, around 5 am, for training, whereas the sekitori may start around 7 am. When the sekitori are training, the junior wrestlers may have chores to do, such as assisting in cooking lunch, cleaning, and preparing baths, holding a sekitori's towel, or wiping the sweat from him. The ranking hierarchy is preserved for the order of precedence in bathing after training, and in eating lunch.

Wrestlers are not normally allowed to eat breakfast and are expected to have a siesta-like nap after a large lunch. The regimen of no breakfast, a very large midday meal, and a long nap afterwards is intended to help wrestlers put on weight so as to compete more effectively. Sumo wrestlers also drink large amounts of beer.

In the afternoon, the junior wrestlers again usually have cleaning or other chores, while their sekitori counterparts may relax, or deal with work issues related to their fan clubs. Younger wrestlers also attend classes, although their education differs from the typical curriculum of their non-sumo peers. In the evening, sekitori may go out with their sponsors, while the junior wrestlers generally stay at home in the stable, unless they are to accompany the stablemaster or a sekitori as his tsukebito (manservant) when he is out. Becoming a tsukebito for a senior member of the stable is a typical duty. A sekitori has a number of tsukebito, depending on the size of the stable or in some cases depending on the size of the sekitori. The junior wrestlers are given the most mundane tasks such as cleaning the stable, running errands, and even washing or massaging the exceptionally large sekitori while only the senior tsukebito accompany the sekitori when he goes out.

The sekitori are given their own room in the stable, or may live in their own apartments, as do married wrestlers; the junior wrestlers sleep in communal dormitories. Thus, the world of the sumo wrestler is split broadly between the junior wrestlers, who serve, and the sekitori, who are served. Life is especially harsh for recruits, to whom the worst jobs tend to be allocated, and the dropout rate at this stage is high.

=== Diet ===
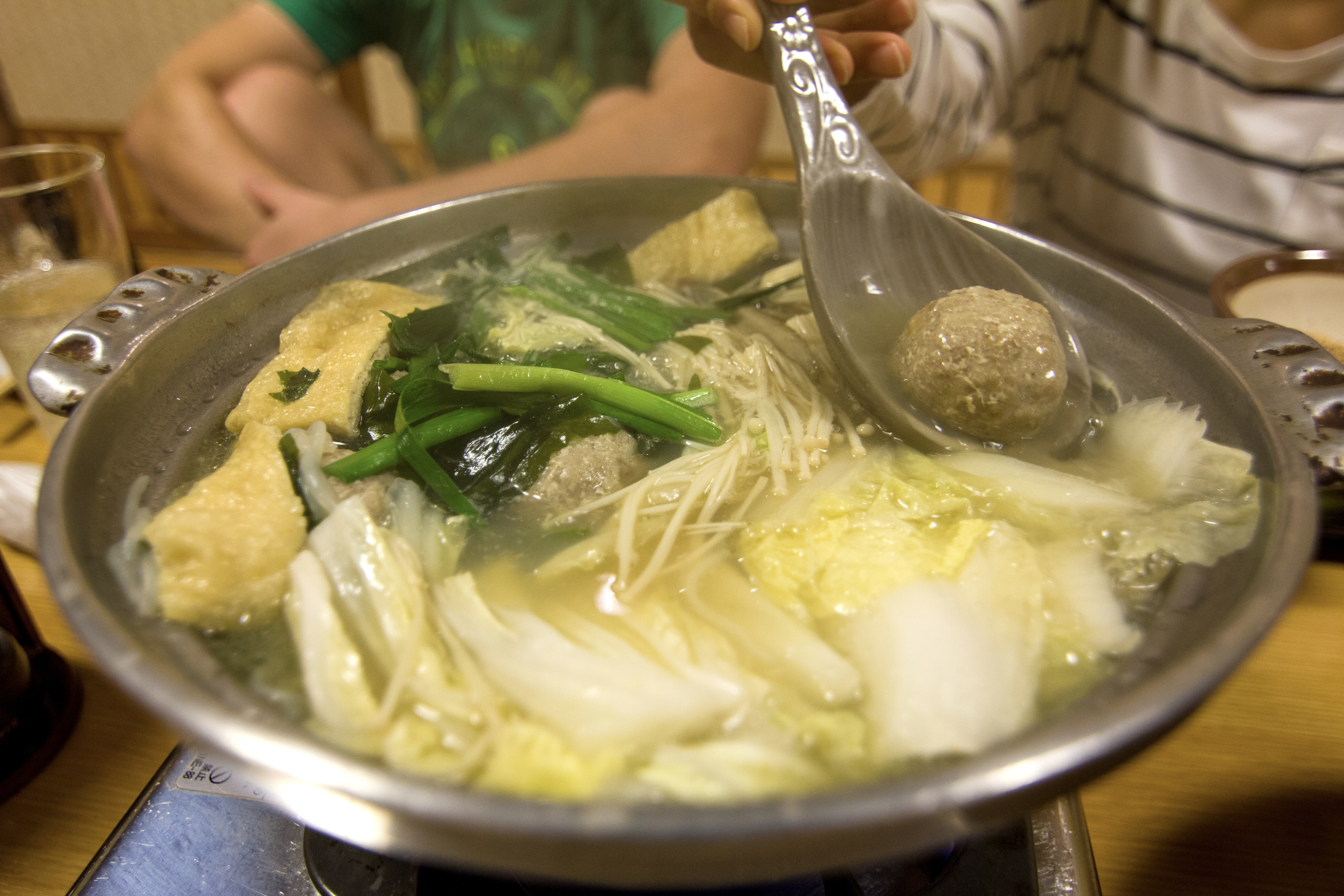
Chankonabe, the traditional stew eaten daily in sumo stables

The most common type of lunch served is the traditional sumo meal of chankonabe, a nabemono (hot pot) stew built on a dashi or chicken broth base flavored with sake or mirin, cooked at the table and usually eaten with rice. The dish is not made according to a fixed recipe and often contains whatever is available to the cook; the bulk is made up of large quantities of protein sources such as chicken, fish (often fried and made into balls), tofu, or sometimes beef, along with vegetables (daikon, bok choy, and others). While considered a reasonably healthy dish in its own right, chankonabe is very protein-rich and is served in massive quantities. Modern wrestlers typically accompany the stew with copious amounts of rice — often five to ten bowls per meal — along with beer, in order to increase caloric intake.

Chankonabe is traditionally served according to seniority, with the senior wrestlers and any guests of the heya receiving first choice and the junior wrestlers getting whatever is left. During honbasho tournaments, chankonabe is made exclusively with chicken, the idea being that a wrestler should always be on two legs like a chicken, and not on all fours.

=== Body composition and health ===
Despite their size, active sumo wrestlers have been found to carry unusually low levels of visceral fat — the metabolically active fat stored around the internal organs — and instead store most of their body fat as subcutaneous fat just beneath the skin. Researchers have attributed this in part to the wrestlers' intense daily training, and to a diet that, despite its caloric load, is relatively low in sugar, processed foods, and added oils; as a result, active wrestlers tend to maintain near-normal blood glucose, triglyceride, and cholesterol levels.

The negative health effects of the sumo lifestyle nevertheless become apparent later in life, particularly after retirement, when training stops but eating habits often persist. Sumo wrestlers have a life expectancy of around 65, some 15 years shorter than that of the average Japanese male, as the diet and sport take a toll on the body, and those who carried higher body mass are at greater risk of death. Many former wrestlers develop type 2 diabetes or high blood pressure, and they are prone to heart attacks owing to the enormous body mass and fat that they accumulate. Excessive intake of alcohol can lead to liver problems, and the stress on joints due to excess weight can cause arthritis. The repeated blows to the head that sumo wrestlers take can also cause long-term cognitive issues, similar to those seen in boxers. In the 21st century, the standards of weight gain became less strict for the sake of the wrestlers' health, and in 2023 the Sumo Association loosened its height and weight requirements for new recruits (see Professional sumo above).

== Salary and payment ==
As of 2018, the monthly salary figures (in Japanese yen) for the top two divisions were:

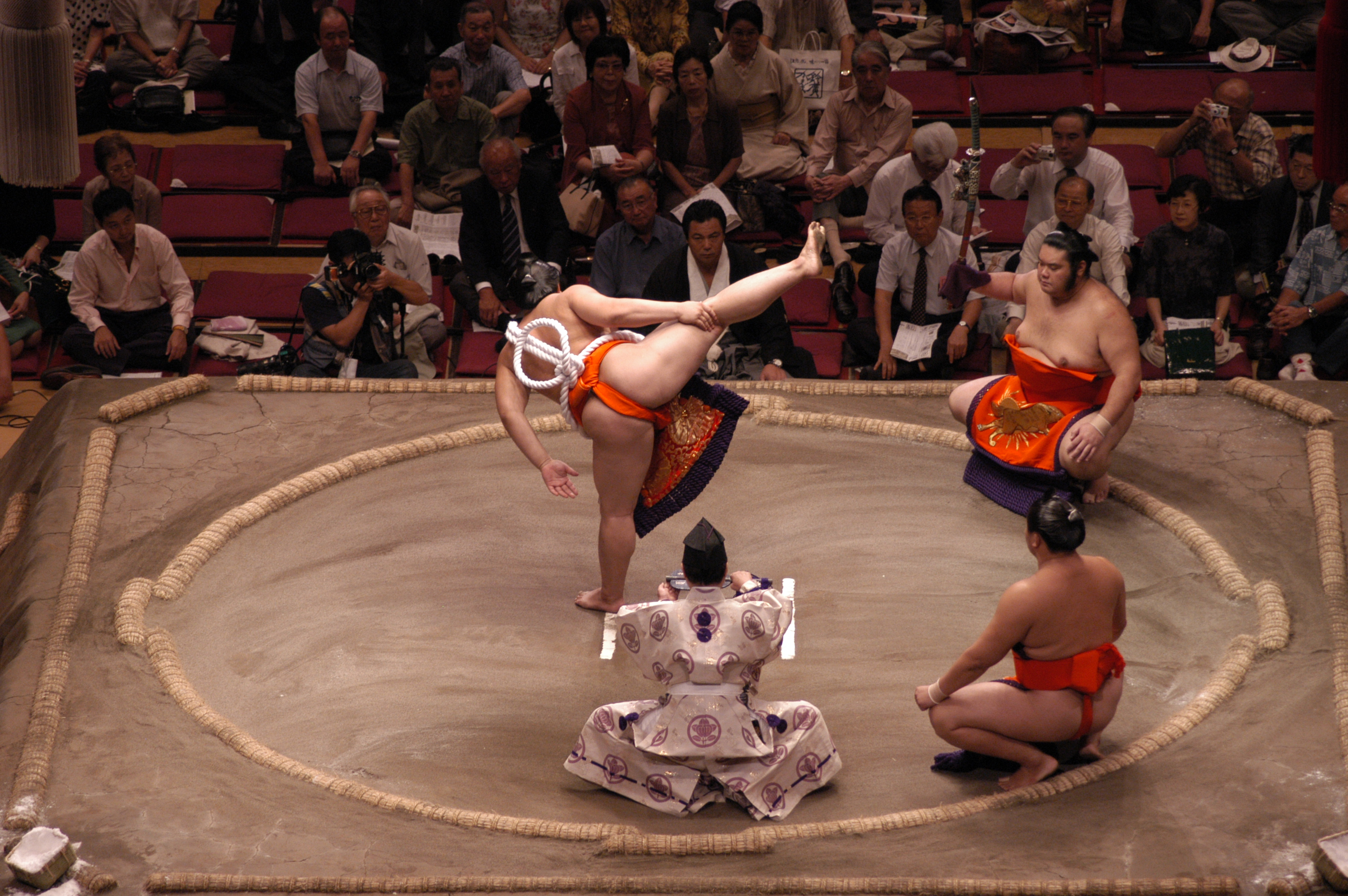
yokozuna Asashōryū performing the distinctive dohyō-iri of his rank (September 2003)

- yokozuna: ¥3 million, about US$19,000
- ōzeki: ¥2.5 million, about US$16,000
- san'yaku: ¥1.8 million, about US$15,000
- maegashira: ¥1.4 million, about US$9,000
- jūryō: ¥1.1 million, about US$7,000

Wrestlers lower than the second-highest division, who are considered trainees, receive only a fairly small allowance instead of a salary.

In addition to the basic salary, sekitori wrestlers also receive additional bonus income, called mochikyūkin, six times a year (once every tournament, or basho) based on the cumulative performance in their career to date. This bonus increases every time the wrestler scores a kachi-koshi (with larger kachi-koshi giving larger raises). Special increases in this bonus are also awarded for winning the top division championship (with an extra large increase for a "perfect" championship victory with no losses or zenshō-yūshō), and also for scoring a gold star or kinboshi (an upset of a yokozuna by a maegashira).

San'yaku wrestlers also receive a relatively small additional tournament allowance, depending on their rank, and yokozuna receive an additional allowance every second tournament, associated with the making of a new tsuna belt worn in their ring entering ceremony.

Also, prize money is given to the winner of each divisional championship, which increases from ¥100,000 for a jonokuchi victory up to ¥10 million for winning the top division. In addition to prizes for a championship, wrestlers in the top division giving an exceptional performance in the eyes of a judging panel can also receive one or more of three special prizes (the sanshō), which are worth ¥2 million each.

Individual top division matches can also be sponsored by companies, with the resulting prize money called kenshōkin. For bouts involving yokozuna and ōzeki, the number of sponsors can be quite large, whereas for lower-ranked matchups, no bout sponsors may be active at all unless one of the wrestlers is particularly popular, or unless a company has a policy of sponsoring all his matchups. As of 2019, a single sponsorship cost ¥70,000, with ¥60,000 going to the winner of the bout and ¥10,000 deducted by the Japan Sumo Association for costs and fees. Immediately after the match, the winner receives an envelope from the referee with half of his share of the sponsorship, while the other half is put in a fund for his retirement. No prize money is awarded for bouts decided by a fusenshō or forfeit victory.

== Amateur sumo ==
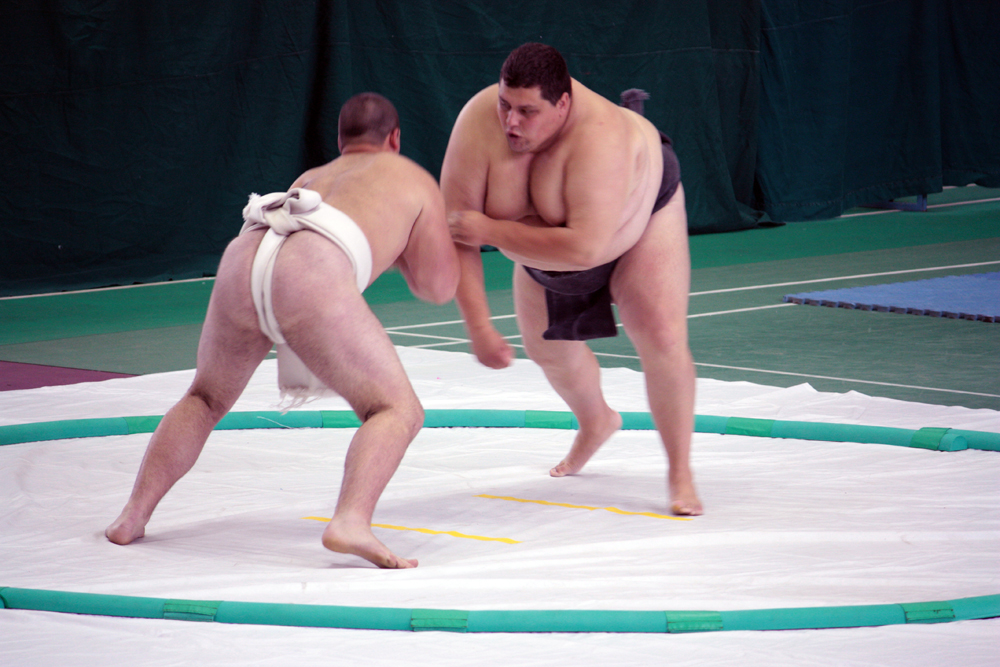
Bulgarian amateurs – on the right is the national coach Hristo Hristov. (2011)

=== Japan ===
Sumo is also practised as an amateur sport in Japan, with participants in college, high school, grade school or company workers on works teams. Open amateur tournaments are also held. The sport at this level is stripped of most of the ceremony. Most new entries into professional sumo are junior high school graduates with little to no previous experience, but the number of wrestlers with a collegiate background in the sport has been increasing over the past few decades. The International Herald Tribune reported on this trend in November 1999, when more than a third of the wrestlers in the top two divisions were university graduates. Nippon Sport Science University and Nihon University are the colleges that have produced the most professional sumo wrestlers. The latter produced Hiroshi Wajima, who in 1973 became the first wrestler with a collegiate background to attain the rank of yokozuna.

The most successful amateur wrestlers (usually college champions) are allowed to enter professional sumo at makushita (third division) or sandanme (fourth division) rather than from the very bottom of the ladder. These ranks are called makushita tsukedashi and sandanme tsukedashi, and are currently equivalent to makushita 10, makushita 15, or sandanme 100 depending on the level of amateur success achieved. All amateur athletes entering the professional ranks must be under 23 to satisfy the entry, except those who qualify for makushita tsukedashi or sandanme tsukedashi, who may be up to 25.

=== International competition ===
The International Sumo Federation (IFS) was established in 1992 to encourage the sport's development worldwide, including holding international championships like the European Sumo Championships and Sumo World Championships.

A key aim of the federation is to have sumo recognized as an Olympic sport. Accordingly, amateur tournaments are divided into weight classes (men: lightweight up to 85 kg (187 lb), middleweight up to 115 kg (254 lb), heavyweight over 115 kg (254 lb), and openweight (unrestricted entry), and include competitions for female wrestlers (lightweight up to 65 kg (143 lb), middleweight up to 80 kg (180 lb), heavyweight over 80 kg (180 lb), and openweight).

Sumo was a feature of the World Games, an Olympics-recognized event for non-Olympic sports, from 2001 until 2022; it was removed from future World Games programs due to poor sportsmanship and organization. It has additionally been a feature of the World Combat Games since their inception in 2010.

The day before the 2025 Sumo World Championship was held in Thailand, International Olympic Committee president Kirsty Coventry shared a message expressing her thanks to the host country and commended sumo for its "cultural roots".

=== United States ===
The sport has long been popular on the United States West Coast and in Hawaii, where it has played a part in the festivals of the Japanese ethnic communities. However the sport has grown beyond the sphere of Japanese diaspora and athletes come from a variety of ethnic, cultural, and sporting backgrounds. Amateur sumo clubs are gaining in popularity throughout the United States, with competitions regularly being held across the country. The US Sumo Open has been held by USA Sumo since 2001, and in 2025 hosted competitors from 9 countries and 4,500 attendees at the Walter Pyramid. The New York Sumo Club held its first annual sumo tournament in Industry City in 2025. Abroad, the United States is represented by the US Sumo Federation, a 501(c)(3) organization that runs the US National Championships as a qualifying event for the Sumo World Championships.

=== Europe ===
Amateur sumo is particularly strong in Europe. Many athletes come to the sport from a background in judo, freestyle wrestling, or other grappling sports such as sambo. Some Eastern European athletes have been successful enough to be scouted into professional sumo in Japan, much like their Japanese amateur counterparts. Europe has so far produced 9 top-division sumo wrestlers, including 4 ōzeki:

- Kotoōshū (Bulgaria) - first European sumo wrestler to reach the rank of ōzeki and first European wrestler to win an Emperor's Cup.
- Baruto Kaito (Estonia) - former basketball player, whose progress was stunted due to injuries. Became the first non-yokozuna since 1986 to defeat five ōzeki in one tournament. Retired at 28.
- Tochinoshin Tsuyoshi (Georgia) - was well known for his strength, and his muscular physique.
- Aonishiki Arata (Ukraine) - refugee from Ukraine, who became the fastest rikishi to progress to Ōzeki (14 tournaments).

=== Brazil ===
Brazil is another center of amateur sumo, introduced by Japanese immigrants who arrived during the first half of the twentieth century. The first Brazilian sumo tournament was held in 1914. Sumo took root in immigrant centers in southern Brazil, especially São Paulo, which is now home to the only purpose-built sumo training facility outside Japan. Beginning in the 1990s, Brazilian sumo organizations made an effort to interest Brazilians without Japanese ancestry in the sport, and by the mid-2000s an estimated 70% of participants came from outside the Japanese-Brazilian community. Brazil is also a center for women's sumo. A small number of Brazilian wrestlers have made the transition to professional sumo in Japan, including Ryūkō Gō and Kaisei Ichirō.

=== United Kingdom ===
In the UK, as early as 1985 a national Sumo Federation existed. Olympic Judoka Syd Hoare was fundamental to initial growth including taking a British team to Japan for first time.

Two national governing bodies existed for a brief time (British Sumo Federation and British Sumo Union), with a new organisation; BritishSumo becoming the recognised national governing body in 2025.

== Clothing ==
Sumo wrestlers wear mawashi, a 30-foot-long belt, that they tie in knots in the back. They have an official thickness and strength requirement. During matches, the wrestler will grab onto the other wrestler's mawashi and use it to help them make moves during a match. The mawashi they wear practicing versus in a tournament is essentially the same except for the material. The different mawashi that the wrestlers wear differentiate their rank. Top rated wrestlers wear different colors of silk mawashi during tournament, while lower rated wrestlers are limited to just black cotton.

Their hair is put in a topknot, and wax is used to get the hair to stay in shape. Wax is applied to sumo wrestlers' hair daily by sumo hairdressers (tokoyama). The topknot is a type of samurai hairstyle which was once popular in Japan during the Edo period. Some foreigners may have trouble wearing a topknot as their hair is not as coarse and straight as Japanese hair. Once a wrestler joins a stable, he is required to grow out his hair in order to form a topknot.

Outside of tournaments and practices, in daily life, sumo wrestlers are required to wear traditional Japanese clothes. They must wear these traditional clothes all the time in public. What they can wear in public is also determined by rank. Lower rated wrestlers must wear a yukata at all times, even in winter, where higher rated wrestlers have more choice in what they wear.

== Gallery ==
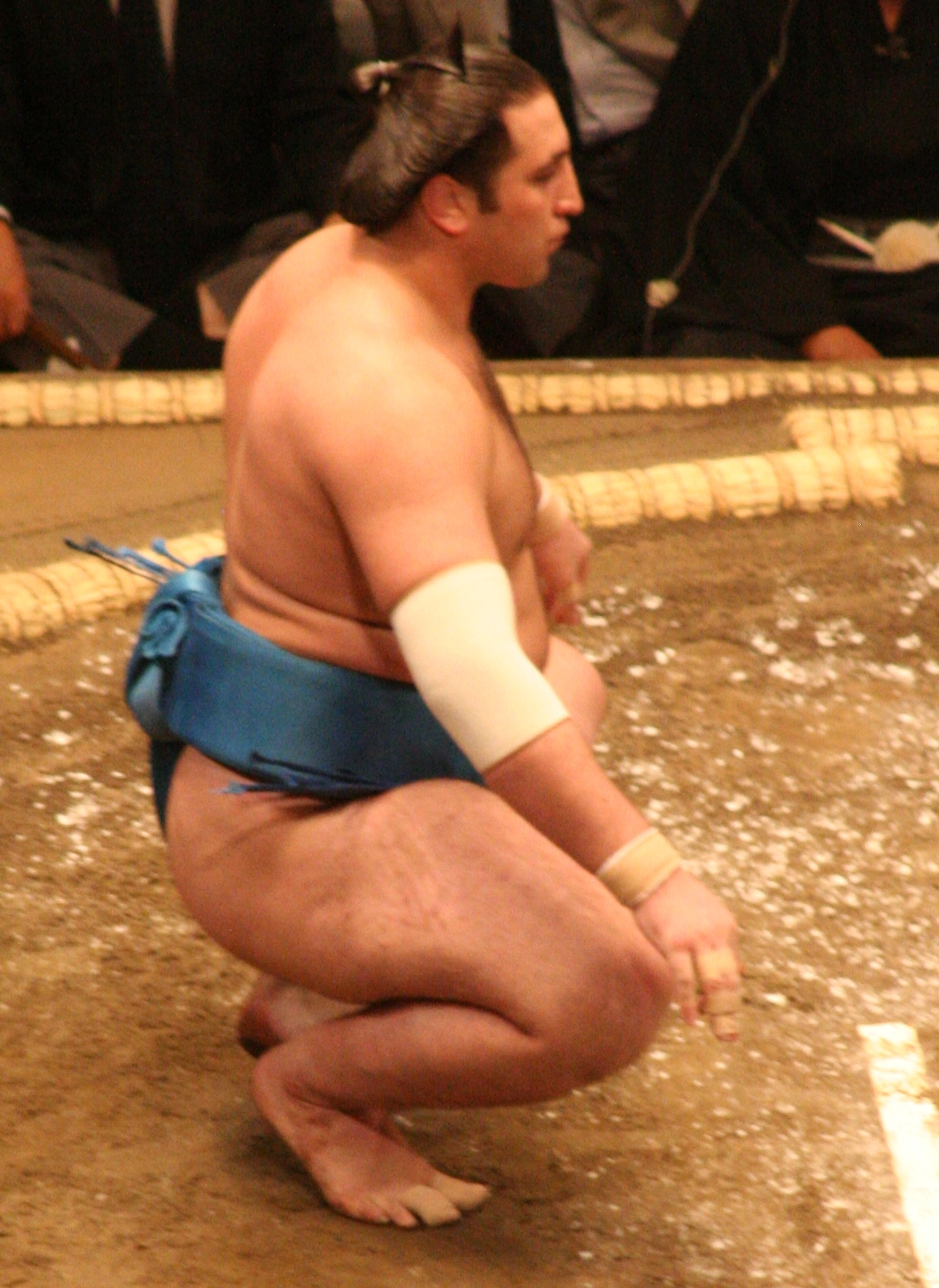
Initial full squat with heels up, Sonkyo (蹲踞) in Japanese

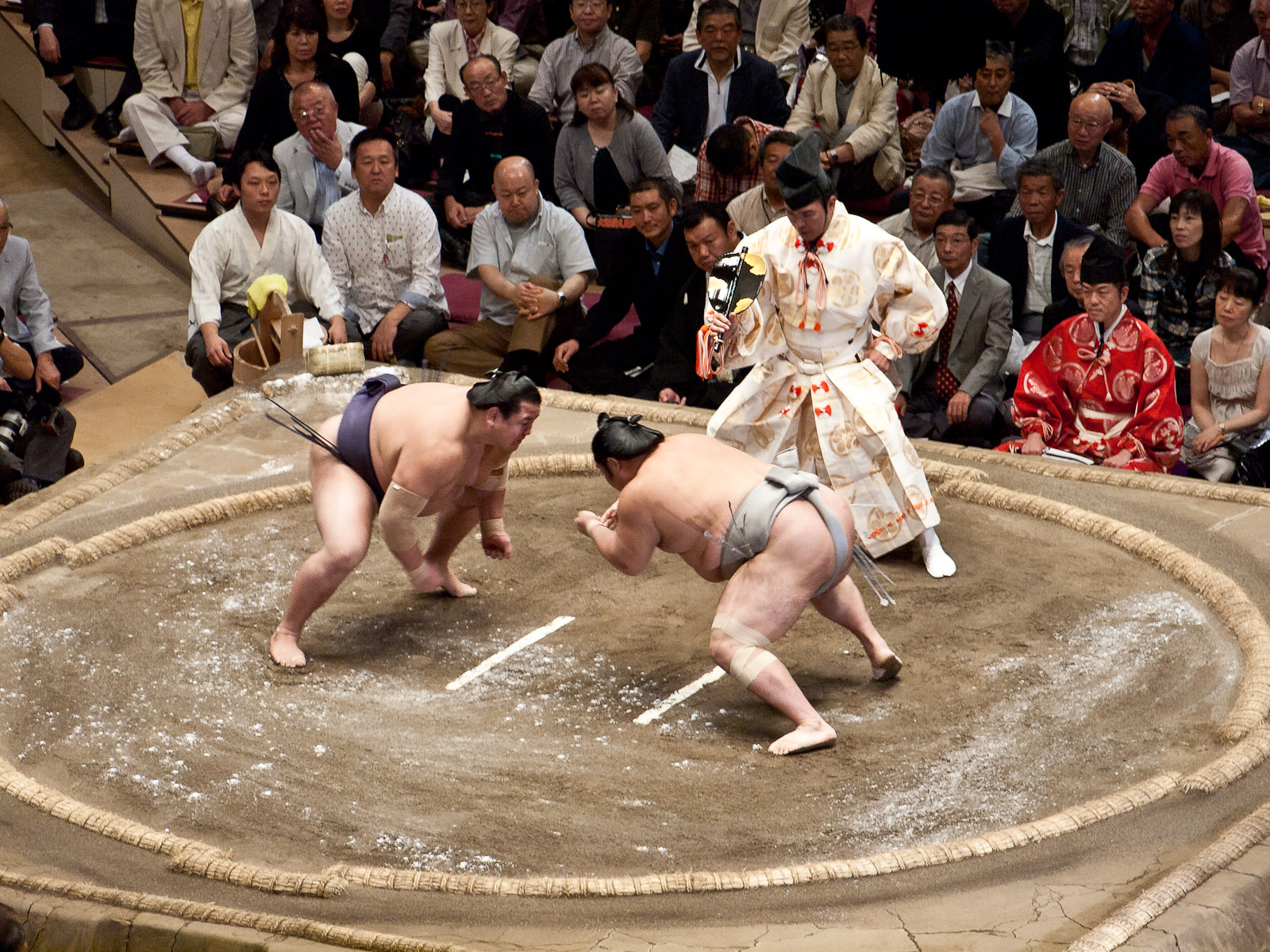
Partial squat before engaging

Yumitori-shiki

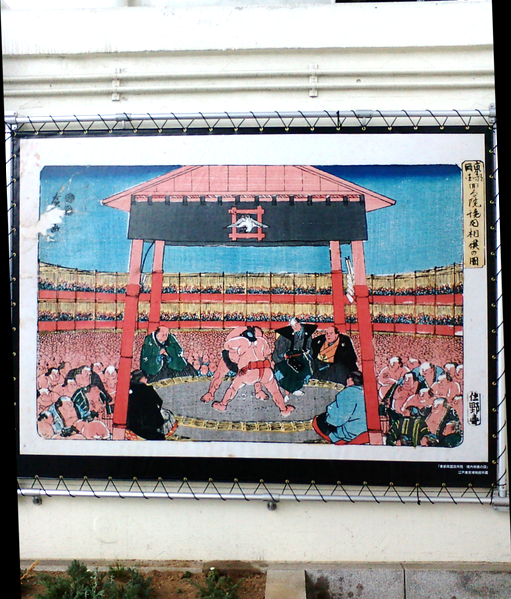
Reproduced, Utagawa Hiroshige's Sumo at Sumida River esplanade

== See also ==
- Controversies in professional sumo
- Culture of Japan
- Glossary of sumo terms
- Kimarite, list of winning moves in sumo
- Kinjite, list of fouls in sumo
- List of active sumo wrestlers
- List of past sumo wrestlers
- List of sumo stables
- List of sumo record holders
- List of sumo tournament second division champions
- List of sumo tournament top division champions
- List of sumo trophies
- List of sumo video games
- List of years in sumo
- List of yokozuna
- Lists of sumo wrestlers
- Naki Sumo Crying Baby Festival
- Robot-sumo, robot competition inspired by sumo
- Ssireum
- Sumo jinku
