= Thailand at the World Games =

- IOC code: THA
- NOC: Thailand Olympic Committee
- Website: www.olympicthai.or.th
- Medals Ranked 31st: Gold 12 Silver 17 Bronze 15 Total 44

World Games appearances (overview)
- 1981; 1985; 1989; 1993; 1997; 2001; 2005; 2009; 2013; 2017; 2022; 2025

Thailand first participated in the World Games in 1981, and has sent athletes to compete in every World Games since then.

== Medal tables ==
=== Medals by Games ===
Games	Gold	Silver	Bronze	Total	Rank
(United States) Santa Clara 1981	0	1	0	1	29
(United Kingdom) London 1985	0	0	0	0	−
(West Germany) Karlsruhe 1989	0	0	0	0	−
(Netherlands) The Hague 1993	0	0	0	0	−
(Finland) Lahti 1997	0	0	0	0	−
(Japan) Akita 2001	0	0	0	0	−
(Germany) Duisburg 2005	0	1	0	1	53
(Chinese Taipei) Kaohsiung 2009	1	0	2	3	32
(Colombia) Cali 2013	0	3	2	5	42
(Poland) Wrocław 2017	3	5	2	10	20
(United States) Birmingham 2022	4	3	2	9	18
(China) Chengdu 2025	4	4	7	15	19
Total	12	17	15	44	31

=== Medals by sport ===
Games	Gold	Silver	Bronze	Total
Air sports	0	2	1	3
Boules sports	2	7	5	14
Bowling	0	1	0	1
Cue sports	0	1	2	3
Dragon boat	1	1	2	4
Ju-jitsu	5	2	1	8
Muaythai	4	3	2	9
Sumo	0	0	1	1
Water skiing	0	0	1	1
Total	12	17	15	44

== List of medalists ==
Medal	Name	Games	Sport	Event
Silver	Porntip Singha	(United States) Santa Clara 1981	Bowling	Women's ten-pin singles
Silver	Noknoi Youngcham; Phantipha Wongchuvej; Thongsri Thamakord	(West Germany) Duisburg 2005	Boules sports	Women's pétanque triples
Gold	Kannika Limwanich; Suphannee Wongsut	(Chinese Taipei) Kaohsiung 2009	Boules sports	Women's pétanque doubles
Bronze	Pakin Phukram; Supan Thongphoo	(Chinese Taipei) Kaohsiung 2009	Boules sports	Men's pétanque doubles
Bronze	Padiwat Jaemjan	(Chinese Taipei) Kaohsiung 2009	Water skiing	Men's wakeboard freestyle
Silver	Nunnapat Phuchong	(Colombia) Cali 2013	Air sports	Women's paragliding accuracy
Silver	Lacsukan Piachan; Thaloengkiat Phusa-at	(Colombia) Cali 2013	Boules sports	Men's pétanque doubles
Silver	Phantipha Wongchuvej; Thongsri Thamakord	(Colombia) Cali 2013	Boules sports	Women's pétanque doubles
Bronze	Tanapat Luangiam	(Colombia) Cali 2013	Air sports	Men's paragliding accuracy
Bronze	Dechawat Poomjaeng	(Colombia) Cali 2013	Cue sports	Men's snooker singles
Gold	Nantawan Fueangsanit; Phantipha Wongchuvej	(Poland) Wrocław 2017	Boules sports	Women's pétanque doubles
Gold	Wiwat Khamtha	(Poland) Wrocław 2017	Muay Thai	Men's 57 kg
Gold	Suppachai Muensang	(Poland) Wrocław 2017	Muay Thai	Men's 71 kg
Silver	Kittiphob Phrommat	(Poland) Wrocław 2017	Air sports	Mixed paramotor slalom
Silver	Thanakorn Sangkaew	(Poland) Wrocław 2017	Boules sports	Men's pétanque precision shooting
Silver	Sarawut Sriboompeng; Thanakorn Sangkaew	(Poland) Wrocław 2017	Boules sports	Men's pétanque doubles
Silver	Nantawan Fueangsanit	(Poland) Wrocław 2017	Boules sports	Women's pétanque precision shooting
Silver	Apasara Koson	(Poland) Wrocław 2017	Muay Thai	Women's 51 kg
Bronze	Anueng Khatthamarasri	(Poland) Wrocław 2017	Muay Thai	Men's 67 kg
Bronze	Viparat Vituteerasan	(Poland) Wrocław 2017	Sumo	Women's heavyweight
Gold	Kanjutha Phattaraboonsorn	(United States) Birmingham 2022	Ju-jitsu	Women's fighting 48 kg
Gold	Lalita Yuennan; Warawut Saengsriruang	(United States) Birmingham 2022	Ju-jitsu	Mixed duo
Gold	Anueng Khatthamarasri	(United States) Birmingham 2022	Muaythai	Men's 67 kg
Gold	Thanet Nitutorn	(United States) Birmingham 2022	Muaythai	Men's 71 kg
Silver	Orapa Senatham	(United States) Birmingham 2022	Ju-jitsu	Women's fighting 63 kg
Silver	Kanjutha Phattaraboonsorn	(United States) Birmingham 2022	Ju-jitsu	Women's ne-waza 48 kg
Silver	Weerasak Tharakhajad	(United States) Birmingham 2022	Muaythai	Men's 63.5 kg
Bronze	Phantipha Wongchuvej	(United States) Birmingham 2022	Boules sports	Women's Petanque Precision Shooting
Bronze	Phantipha Wongchuvej; Nantawan Fueangsanit	(United States) Birmingham 2022	Boules sports	Women's Petanque Doubles
Gold	Mixed Team	(China) Chengdu 2025	Dragon boat	Mixed 10-seater 200 m
Gold	Warawut Saengsriruang; Lalita Yuennan	(China) Chengdu 2025	Ju-jitsu	Mixed Duo Team Open
Gold	Warut Netpong; Charatchai Kitpongsri	(China) Chengdu 2025	Ju-jitsu	Mixed Duo Show Open
Gold	Orapa Senatham	(China) Chengdu 2025	Ju-jitsu	Women's 63 kg Fighting
Silver	Ratchata Khamdee; Nantawan Fueangsanit	(China) Chengdu 2025	Boules sports	Mixed Petanque Classic Doubles
Silver	Narucha Phoemphul	(China) Chengdu 2025	Cue sports	Snooker Women's 6-reds
Silver	Mixed Team	(China) Chengdu 2025	Dragon boat	Open 8-seater 200 m
Silver	Kullanat Aonok	(China) Chengdu 2025	Muaythai	Women's 48 kg
Bronze	Ratchata Khamdee	(China) Chengdu 2025	Boules sports	Men's Petanque Precision Shooting
Bronze	Nantawan Fueangsanit	(China) Chengdu 2025	Boules sports	Women's Petanque Precision Shooting
Bronze	Ploychompoo Laokiatphong	(China) Chengdu 2025	Cue sports	Snooker Women's 6-reds
Bronze	Mixed Team	(China) Chengdu 2025	Dragon boat	Mixed 10-seater 500 m
Bronze	Mixed Team	(China) Chengdu 2025	Dragon boat	Open 8-seater 500 m
Bronze	Nuchanat Singchalad	(China) Chengdu 2025	Ju-jitsu	Women's 52 kg Fighting
Bronze	Kaewrudee Kamtakrapoom	(China) Chengdu 2025	Muaythai	Women's 60 kg

== See also ==
- Olympics
  - Thailand at the Olympics
  - Thailand at the Youth Olympics
- Paralympic
  - Thailand at the Paralympics
- Asian Games
  - Thailand at the Asian Games
  - Thailand at the Asian Para Games
- Other
  - Thailand at the Universiade
