= Boules sports at the 2009 World Games – Men's lyonnaise progressive =

Men's lyonnaise progressive event in boules sports

Boules - men's lyonnaise progressive at the World Games
- Venue: 228 Memorial Park
- Date: 20-22 July 2009
- Competitors: 6 from 6 nations

Medalists
1st place, gold medalist(s)		Aleš Borčnik
2nd place, silver medalist(s)		Alessandro Longo
3rd place, bronze medalist(s)		Sébastien Mourgues

The men's lyonnaise progressive event in boules sports at the 2009 World Games took place from 20 to 22 July 2009 at the 228 Memorial Park in Kaohsiung, Taiwan.

== Competition format ==
A total of 6 athletes entered the competition. Best four athletes from preliminary round qualifies to the semifinals. Best two athletes from this stage advances to gold medal match.

== Results ==
=== Preliminary ===
Rank	Athlete	Nation	Score	Note
1	Alessandro Longo	Italy	39/48	Q
1	Aleš Borčnik	Slovenia	39/48	Q
3	Sébastien Mourgues	France	34/46	Q
4	Tomislav Kolobarić	Croatia	32/47	Q
5	Li Chunfeng	China	30/44	
6	Wei Hai-lun	Chinese Taipei	17/47	

=== Semifinal ===
Rank	Athlete	Nation	Score	Note
1	Alessandro Longo	Italy	43/47	Q
2	Aleš Borčnik	Slovenia	42/49	Q
3	Sébastien Mourgues	France	38/48	
4	Tomislav Kolobarić	Croatia	35/48	

=== Finals ===
	Score	
Gold medal match
Aleš Borčnik (SLO)	44/50-39/48	Alessandro Longo (ITA)
Bronze medal match
Sébastien Mourgues (FRA)	43/48-33/46	Tomislav Kolobarić (CRO)
