= Boules sports at the 2009 World Games – Men's raffa doubles =

Boules - men's raffa doubles at the 2009 World Games
- Venue: 228 Memorial Park, Kaohsiung, Taiwan
- Date: 20-22 July 2009
- Competitors: 12 from 6 nations

Medalists
1st place, gold medalist(s)		Pasquale D'Alterio; Gianluca Formicone	Italy
2nd place, silver medalist(s)		Raúl Basualdo; Francisco Spessot	Argentina
3rd place, bronze medalist(s)		Milton Schmitz; Rafael Vanz Borges	Brazil

The men's raffa doubles event in boules sports at the 2009 World Games took place from 20 to 22 July 2009 at the 228 Memorial Park in Kaohsiung, Taiwan.

== Competition format ==
A total of 6 teams entered the competition. In preliminary round they divided into two groups and played round-robin tournament. From this stage the best two pairs in each group advanced to the semifinals.

== Results ==
=== Preliminary ===
Group A

Rank	Team	Country	M	W	L	Pts	+/–
1	Pasquale D'Alterio; Gianluca Formicone	Italy	2	2	0	30-2	+28
2	Aldo Bavestrello; Rodolfo Galvez	Chile	2	1	1	15-27	-12
3	Han Liqiang; Li Wei	China	2	0	2	14-30	-16

Team	Score	Team
Italy	15-2	China
China	12–15	Chile
Italy	15-0	Chile

Group B

Rank	Team	Country	M	W	L	Pts	+/–
1	Raúl Basualdo; Francisco Spessot	Argentina	2	2	0	30-2	+28
2	Milton Schmitz; Rafael Vanz Borges	Brazil	2	1	1	15-17	-2
3	Chen Hung-ting; Huang Wei-hsiang	Chinese Taipei	2	0	2	5-30	-25

Team	Score	Team
Brazil	2-15	Argentina
Argentina	15-5	Chinese Taipei
Brazil	15-0	Chinese Taipei

=== Finals ===
Semifinals
Italy	15
Brazil	14
Argentina	15
Chile	9

Final
Italy	13
Argentina	0
Third place
Brazil	15
Chile	14
