= Boules sports at the 2009 World Games – Men's lyonnaise precision =

Boules - men's lyonnaise precision at the World Games
- Venue: 228 Memorial Park
- Date: 21–22 July 2009
- Competitors: 6 from 6 nations

Medalists
1st place, gold medalist(s)		(Croatia) Gianfranco Santoro
2nd place, silver medalist(s)		(Italy) Emanuele Ferrero
3rd place, bronze medalist(s)		(Bosnia and Herzegovina) Markica Dodig

The men's lyonnaise precision event in boules sports at the 2009 World Games took place from 21 to 22 July 2009 at the 228 Memorial Park in Kaohsiung, Taiwan.

== Competition format ==
A total of 6 athletes entered the competition. Best four athletes from preliminary round qualifies to the final.

== Results ==
=== Preliminary ===
Rank	Athlete	Nation	Round 1	Round 2	Score	Note
1	Gianfranco Santoro	Croatia	3	27	27	Q
2	Emanuele Ferrero	Italy	24	18	24	Q
3	Zhang Yixin	China	6	22	22	Q
4	Markica Dodig	Bosnia and Herzegovina	6	18	18	Q
5	Huang Hsien-chang	Chinese Taipei	5	16	16	
6	Davor Skanata	Montenegro	4	0	4	

=== Final ===
Rank	Athlete	Nation	Score
1st place, gold medalist(s)	Gianfranco Santoro	Croatia	21
2nd place, silver medalist(s)	Emanuele Ferrero	Italy	18
3rd place, bronze medalist(s)	Markica Dodig	Bosnia and Herzegovina	12
4	Zhang Yixin	China	10
