= Boules sports at the 2009 World Games – Men's pétanque doubles =

Boules - men's pétanque doubles at the World Games
- Venue: 228 Memorial Park
- Date: 20-22 July 2009
- Competitors: 12 from 6 nations

Medalists
1st place, gold medalist(s)		Damien Hureau; Julien Lamour	France
2nd place, silver medalist(s)		Fabrice Uytterhoeven; William Van der Biest	Belgium
3rd place, bronze medalist(s)		Pakin Phukram; Supan Thongphoo	Thailand

The men's pétanque doubles event in boules sports at the 2009 World Games took place from 20 to 22 July 2009 at the 228 Memorial Park in Kaohsiung, Taiwan.

== Competition format ==
A total of 6 teams entered the competition. In preliminary round they played round-robin tournament. From this stage the best four pairs advanced to the semifinals.

== Results ==
=== Preliminary ===
Rank	Team	Country	M	W	L	Pts	+/–
1	Pakin Phukram; Supan Thongphoo	Thailand	4	4	0	49–17	+32
2	Damien Hureau; Julien Lamour	France	4	2	2	34–30	+4
3	Chen Hung-wen; Sun Chia-yi	Chinese Taipei	4	2	2	33–35	-2
4	Fabrice Uytterhoeven; William Van der Biest	Belgium	4	2	2	26-34	-8
5	Eliyahu Ochana; Noam Seifer	Israel	4	0	4	11-52	–41
6	Irenee Rajaonarison; Hary Tania Relevason	Madagascar	0	0	0–0	0	

Team	Score	Team
France	10–7	Chinese Taipei
Israel	5–13	Belgium
Thailand	13–6	Belgium
France	13–0	Israel
France	3–13	Belgium
Chinese Taipei	0–13	Thailand
Chinese Taipei	13–6	Israel
France	8–10	Thailand
Israel	3–13	Thailand
Chinese Taipei	13-6	Belgium

=== Finals ===
Semifinals
Belgium	13
Chinese Taipei	4
Thailand	4
France	13

Final
Belgium	5
France	13
Third place
Chinese Taipei	2
Thailand	13
