= Boules sports at the 2009 World Games – Women's lyonnaise progressive =

Boules - women's lyonnaise progressive at the World Games
- Venue: 228 Memorial Park
- Date: 20-22 July 2009
- Competitors: 6 from 6 nations

Medalists
1st place, gold medalist(s)		Cheng Xiping
2nd place, silver medalist(s)		Laurence Essertel
3rd place, bronze medalist(s)		Chiara Soligon

The women's lyonnaise progressive event in boules sports at the 2009 World Games took place from 20 to 22 July 2009 at the 228 Memorial Park in Kaohsiung, Taiwan.

== Competition Format ==
A total of 6 athletes enter the competition, and the best four athletes from the preliminary round qualify for the semifinals. The best two athletes from this stage advance to the finals.

== Results ==
=== Preliminary ===
Rank	Athlete	Nation	Score	Note
1	Cheng Xiping	China	40/47	Q
2	Chiara Soligon	Italy	35/42	Q
3	Huang Yu-ju	Chinese Taipei	32/46	Q
3	Laurence Essertel	France	32/44	Q
5	Nina Sodec	Slovenia	26/38	
6	Sevda Keklik	Turkey	25/43	

=== Semifinal ===
Rank	Athlete	Nation	Score	Note
1	Cheng Xiping	China	40/47	Q
2	Laurence Essertel	France	37/44	Q
3	Chiara Soligon	Italy	28/42	
4	Huang Yu-ju	Chinese Taipei	19/45	

=== Finals ===
	Score	
Gold medal match
Laurence Essertel (FRA)	31/45-32/48	Cheng Xiping (CHN)
Bronze medal match
Chiara Soligon (ITA)	33/41-27/45	Huang Yu-ju (TPE)
