= Boules sports at the 2009 World Games – Women's lyonnaise precision =

Boules - women's lyonnaise precision at the World Games
- Venue: 228 Memorial Park
- Date: 21-22 July 2009
- Competitors: 6 from 6 nations

Medalists
1st place, gold medalist(s)		Yang Ying
2nd place, silver medalist(s)		Magali Jouve
3rd place, bronze medalist(s)		Paola Mandola

The women's lyonnaise precision event in boules sports at the 2009 World Games took place from 21 to 22 July 2009 at the 228 Memorial Park in Kaohsiung, Taiwan.

== Competition format ==
A total of 6 athletes entered the competition. Best four athletes from preliminary round qualifies to the final.

== Results ==
=== Preliminary ===
Rank	Athlete	Nation	Round 1	Round 2	Score	Note
1	Magali Jouve	France	26	21	26	Q
2	Paola Mandola	Italy	5	17	17	Q
2	Yang Ying	China	11	17	17	Q
4	Tsao Chia-hui	Chinese Taipei	4	12	12	Q
5	Ingrid Angulo	Venezuela	9	12	12	
6	Mariolina Saletti	Peru	4	10	10	

=== Final ===
Rank	Athlete	Nation	Score
1st place, gold medalist(s)	Yang Ying	China	20
2nd place, silver medalist(s)	Magali Jouve	France	19
3rd place, bronze medalist(s)	Paola Mandola	Italy	5
4	Tsao Chia-hui	Chinese Taipei	3
