= Boules sports at the 2009 World Games =

- Venue: 228 Memorial Park
- Dates: 20–22 July 2009
- Competitors: 68 from 18 nations

The boules sports events at the 2009 World Games in Kaohsiung was played between 20 and 22 July. 68 competitors, from 18 nations, participated in the tournament. The boules sports competition took place at 228 Memorial Park.

== Participating nations ==
- Argentina (4)
- Belgium (2)
- Bosnia and Herzegovina (1)
- Brazil (4)
- Canada (2)
- Chile (2)
- China (8)
- Chinese Taipei (12)
- France (7)
- Israel (4)
- Italy (8)
- Montenegro (1)
- Peru (1)
- Slovenia (2)
- Spain (2)
- Thailand (4)
- Turkey (3)
- Venezuela (1)

== Medal table ==
Rank	Nation	Gold	Silver	Bronze	Total
1	Italy	2	2	2	6
2	China	2	0	0	2
3	France	1	3	1	5
4	Thailand	1	0	1	2
5	Croatia	1	0	0	1
5	Slovenia	1	0	0	1
7	Brazil	0	1	1	2
8	Argentina	0	1	0	1
8	Belgium	0	1	0	1
10	Bosnia and Herzegovina	0	0	1	1
10	Israel	0	0	1	1
10	Turkey	0	0	1	1
Totals (12 entries)		8	8	8	24

== Events ==
=== Men's events ===
Event	Gold	Silver	Bronze
Lyonnaise precision	Gianfranco Santoro; Croatia	Emanuele Ferrero; Italy	Markica Dodig; Bosnia and Herzegovina
Lyonnaise progressive	Aleš Borčnik; Slovenia	Alessandro Longo; Italy	Sébastien Mourgues; France
Pétanque doubles	France; Damien Hureau; Julien Lamour	Belgium; Fabrice Uytterhoeven; William Van der Biest	Thailand; Pakin Phukram; Supan Thongphoo
Raffa doubles	Italy; Pasquale D'Alterio; Gianluca Formicone	Argentina; Raúl Basualdo; Francisco Spessot	Brazil; Milton Schmitz; Rafael Vanz Borges

=== Women's events ===
Event	Gold	Silver	Bronze
Lyonnaise precision	Yang Ying; China	Magali Jouve; France	Paola Mandola; Italy
Lyonnaise progressive	Cheng Xiping; China	Laurence Essertel; France	Chiara Soligon; Italy
Pétanque doubles	Thailand; Kannika Limwanich; Suphannee Wongsut	France; Nadège Baussian; Ranya Kouadri	Israel; Margalit Ossi; Gali Shriki
Raffa doubles	Italy; Loana Capelli; Elisa Luccarini	Brazil; Noeli Dalla Corte; Ingrid Schulz	Turkey; Deniz Demir; Rukiye Yüksel
