= Ju-jitsu at the 2009 World Games – Men's fighting −69 kg =

Ju-jitsu men's fighting −69 kg at the 2009 World Games
- Venue: National Sun Yat-Sen University Gymnasium, Kaohsiung, Taiwan
- Dates: 21 July 2009
- Competitors: 8 from 8 nations

Medalists
gold medal	(France) Julien Boussuge
silver medal	(Denmark) Mathias Willard
bronze medal	(Russia) Fedor Serov

The men's fighting −69 kg competition in ju-jitsu at the 2009 World Games took place on 21 July 2009 at the National Sun Yat-Sen University Gymnasium in Kaohsiung, Taiwan.

== Competition format ==
A total of 8 athletes entered the competition. They fought in stepladder system.

== Results ==
=== Gold medal bracket ===
Quarterfinals
(Chinese Taipei) Liu Chieng-hung (TPE)	L
(France) Julien Boussuge (FRA)	W
(Italy) Marco Baratti (ITA)	L
(Russia) Fedor Serov (RUS)	W
(Germany) Andrej Tierbach (GER)	W
(Kazakhstan) Yerlan Tleumbetov (KAZ)	L
(Netherlands) Godefridus Hendriks (NED)	L
(Denmark) Mathias Willard (DEN)	W

Semifinals
(France) Julien Boussuge (FRA)	W
(Russia) Fedor Serov (RUS)	L
(Germany) Andrej Tierbach (GER)	L
(Denmark) Mathias Willard (DEN)	W

Final
(France) Julien Boussuge (FRA)	W
(Denmark) Mathias Willard (DEN)	L

=== Bronze medal bracket ===
Quarterfinals
(Chinese Taipei) Liu Chieng-hung (TPE)	W
(Italy) Marco Baratti (ITA)	L
(Kazakhstan) Yerlan Tleumbetov (KAZ)	W
(Netherlands) Godefridus Hendriks (NED)	L

Semifinals
(Chinese Taipei) Liu Chieng-hung (TPE)	L
(Germany) Andrej Tierbach (GER)	W
(Kazakhstan) Yerlan Tleumbetov (KAZ)	L
(Russia) Fedor Serov (RUS)	W

Final
(Germany) Andrej Tierbach (GER)	L
(Russia) Fedor Serov (RUS)	W
