= Boules sports at the 2009 World Games – Women's pétanque doubles =

Boules - women's pétanque doubles at the 2009 World Games
- Venue: 228 Memorial Park
- Date: 20–22 July 2009
- Competitors: 12 from 6 nations

Medalists
1st place, gold medalist(s)		Kannika Limwanich; Suphannee Wongsut	Thailand
2nd place, silver medalist(s)		Nadège Baussian; Ranya Kouadri	France
3rd place, bronze medalist(s)		Margalit Ossi; Gali Shriki	Israel

The women's pétanque doubles event in boules sports at the 2009 World Games took place from 20 to 22 July 2009 at the 228 Memorial Park in Kaohsiung, Taiwan.

== Competition format ==
A total of 6 teams entered the competition. In preliminary round they played round-robin tournament. From this stage the best four pairs advanced to the semifinals.

== Results ==
=== Preliminary ===
Rank	Team	Country	M	W	D	L	Pts	+/–
1	Nadège Baussian; Ranya Kouadri	France	5	5	0	0	65-13	+52
2	Kannika Limwanich; Suphannee Wongsut	Thailand	5	4	0	1	56-20	+36
3	Reyes Dorado; Silvia Garces	Spain	5	3	0	2	40-50	-10
4	Margalit Ossi; Gali Shriki	Israel	5	2	0	3	27-50	-23
5	Sonia Coulombe; Julie Fradette	Canada	5	0	1	4	34-62	–28
6	Chen Tzu-An; Yang Tai-Hua	Chinese Taipei	5	0	1	4	22-35	-13

Team	Score	Team
Canada	5-13	Spain
Israel	0–13	France
Chinese Taipei	1-13	Thailand
France	13–3	Chinese Taipei
Israel	9–11	Canada
Spain	1–13	Thailand
Spain	11–9	Israel
Spain	13–2	Chinese Taipei
Israel	1-13	Thailand
Spain	11-9	Israel
Canada	12–12	Chinese Taipei
France	13-4	Thailand
Israel	6-4	Chinese Taipei
Spain	2-13	France
Canada	4-13	Thailand

=== Finals ===
Semifinals
Thailand	13
Spain	2
France	13
Israel	2

Final
Thailand	13
France	9
Third place
Israel	13
Spain	11
