= Ju-jitsu at the 2009 World Games – Women's fighting −62 kg =

Ju-jitsu women's fighting −62 kg at the 2009 World Games
- Venue: National Sun Yat-Sen University Gymnasium, Kaohsiung, Taiwan
- Dates: 21 July 2009
- Competitors: 8 from 8 nations

Medalists
gold medal	(Germany) Sabrina Hatzky
silver medal	(Chinese Taipei) Yang Hsien-tzu
bronze medal	(Netherlands) Irene Baars

The women's fighting −62 kg competition in ju-jitsu at the 2009 World Games took place on 21 July 2009 at the National Sun Yat-Sen University Gymnasium in Kaohsiung, Taiwan.

== Competition format ==
A total of 8 athletes entered the competition. They fought in stepladder system.

== Results ==
=== Gold medal bracket ===
Quarterfinals
(Russia) Yulia Berezikova (RUS)	L
(Netherlands) Irene Baars (NED)	W
(France) Laure Campagne (FRA)	L
(Germany) Sabrina Hatzky (GER)	W
(Montenegro) Tanja Jubacanin (MNE)	L
(Chinese Taipei) Yang Hsien-tzu (TPE)	W
(Belgium) Nadia Bertrand (BEL)	W
(Israel) Darya Rilsky (ISR)	L

Semifinals
(Netherlands) Irene Baars (NED)	L
(Germany) Sabrina Hatzky (GER)	W
(Chinese Taipei) Yang Hsien-tzu (TPE)	W
(Belgium) Nadia Bertrand (BEL)	L

Final
(Germany) Sabrina Hatzky (GER)	W
(Chinese Taipei) Yang Hsien-tzu (TPE)	L

=== Bronze medal bracket ===
Quarterfinals
(Russia) Yulia Berezikova (RUS)	W
(France) Laure Campagne (FRA)	L
(Montenegro) Tanja Jubacanin (MNE)	W
(Israel) Darya Rilsky (ISR)	L

Semifinals
(Russia) Yulia Berezikova (RUS)	W
(Belgium) Nadia Bertrand (BEL)	L
(Montenegro) Tanja Jubacanin (MNE)	L
(Netherlands) Irene Baars (NED)	W

Final
(Russia) Yulia Berezikova (RUS)	L
(Netherlands) Irene Baars (NED)	W
