= Sport climbing at the 2009 World Games =

Competition climbing event

Sport climbing at the 2005 World Games
- Venue: Shoushan Junior High School
- Dates: 18–19 July 2009
- Competitors: 43 from 17 nations

Competition climbing at the 2009 World Games in Kaohsiung was played between 18 and 19 July. 43 athletes, from 17 nations, participated in the tournament in competition lead climbing and competition speed climbing events. The competition took place in Shoushan Junior High School.

== Participating nations ==
- Australia (2)
- Austria (2)
- China (4)
- Chinese Taipei (4)
- France (2)
- Indonesia (1)
- Japan (3)
- Mexico (1)
- New Zealand (1)
- Poland (2)
- Russia (4)
- Slovenia (2)
- South Korea (2)
- Spain (2)
- Ukraine (4)
- United States (2)
- Venezuela (5)

== Medal table ==
Rank	Nation	Gold	Silver	Bronze	Total
1	China	2	1	0	3
2	Japan	1	0	0	1
2	Slovenia	1	0	0	1
4	Russia	0	1	1	2
5	South Korea	0	1	0	1
5	Spain	0	1	0	1
7	France	0	0	2	2
8	Ukraine	0	0	1	1
Totals (8 entries)		4	4	4	12

== Medals summary ==
=== Men ===
Event	Gold	Silver	Bronze
Speed	Zhong Qixin (CHN)	Yevgeniy Vaitsekhovskiy (RUS)	Maksym Styenkoviy (UKR)
Lead	Sachi Amma (JPN)	Patxi Usobiaga (ESP)	Romain Desgranges (FRA)

=== Women ===
Event	Gold	Silver	Bronze
Speed	He Cuilian (CHN)	He Cuifang (CHN)	Olga Morozkina (RUS)
Lead	Maja Vidmar (SLO)	Kim Ja-In (KOR)	Caroline Ciavaldini (FRA)
