= Dragon boat at the 2009 World Games =

- Venue: Lotus Pond, Kaohsiung
- Dates: 17–18 July 2009
- Competitors: 258 from 10 nations

The Dragon boat events at the 2009 World Games in Kaohsiung was played between 17 and 18 July. 258 athletes, from 10 nations, participated in the tournament. The dragon boat competition took place at Lotus Pond, Kaohsiung.

== Participating nations ==
- Canada (25)
- China (25)
- Germany (25)
- Hungary (23)
- Japan (23)
- Russia (38)
- Sweden (23)
- Chinese Taipei (28)
- Ukraine (21)
- United States (27)

== Medal table ==
* Host nation (Chinese Taipei)

Rank	Nation	Gold	Silver	Bronze	Total
1	Russia	4	0	0	4
2	Hungary	0	2	1	3
3	Chinese Taipei*	0	1	1	2
3	Germany	0	1	1	2
5	Canada	0	0	1	1
Totals (5 entries)		4	4	4	12

== Events ==
Event	Gold	Silver	Bronze
200 m	Russia	Hungary	Chinese Taipei
500 m	Russia	Hungary	Germany
1000 m	Russia	Germany	Hungary
2000 m	Russia	Chinese Taipei	Canada
