= Dante D'Alessandro =

Personal information
- Nationality: Italian
- Born: 3 September 1950 (age 76) Roseto degli Abruzzi, Italy

Sport
- Country: Italy
- Sport: Bocce
- Event: Raffa
Medal record
World Championships
Gold medal – first place	Chiasso 1983	Singles
Gold medal – first place	Chiasso 1983	Triples
Gold medal – first place	Chiasso 1983	Team
Gold medal – first place	1985	Team
Gold medal – first place	1987	Singles
Gold medal – first place	1987	Triples
Gold medal – first place	1987	Team
Gold medal – first place	Lugano 1988	Singles
Gold medal – first place	1989	Team
Gold medal – first place	Lugano 1991	Team
Gold medal – first place	Montreal 1993	Singles
Gold medal – first place	Nuoro 1995	Team
Gold medal – first place	San Marino 1997	Singles
World Club Championships
Gold medal – first place	1994	De Merolis
Gold medal – first place	1996	De Merolis
European Championships
Gold medal – first place	1988	Team
Gold medal – first place	Budapest 1992	Team

Dante D'Alessandro (born 3 September 1950) is an Italian bocce player specialising in raffa, who won fifteen world titles, including two World Club Championships, and two European titles.

== Biography ==
Considered the strongest raffa player of the 1980s and 1990s, D'Alessandro began playing bocce at the age of fifteen, joining the Circolo Bocce Teramano in 1969. Initially employed as a puntista, a player specialising in placing bowls close to the jack, he achieved his first provincial-level victory at the age of twenty-four and his first national-level success the following year. After finding employment with the Italian National Firefighters Corps, the shift-work schedule enabled him to devote more time to training. In 1978, he began combining technical preparation with physical conditioning, taking inspiration from the training methods of Roseto's basketball team. Within a few months, this change allowed him to move from the role of puntista to that of bocciatore, specialising in shooting.

During his career, D'Alessandro played for twenty-one seasons with De Merolis, a club based in San Nicolò a Tordino, where he also played alongside Renato Scacchioli. Much of his competitive success was associated with this club.

At international level, D'Alessandro's career developed alongside the international reorganisation of raffa. In 1983, the Confederazione Boccistica Internazionale (CBI) was established and organised the first World Championships that same year, with thirteen nations participating. The competition was dominated by Italian players, including Bruno Suardi and D'Alessandro himself. At the championships held in Chiasso, D'Alessandro won three gold medals in the singles, triples and team competitions. He shared the team title with Afro Molinari, Angelo Papandrea and Suardi.

The following year, in Pesaro, D'Alessandro won his first Italian singles championship, before becoming world team champion again in 1985. Overall, 1985 was one of the most successful periods of the athlete's career, as he achieved 86 consecutive victories before being defeated in a doubles match played alongside Scacchioli.

In 1987, D'Alessandro won three further world titles, taking gold in the singles, triples and team competitions. The following year, at Lugano, he won the world singles championship again, defeating fellow Italian Riccardo Odorico in the final. In the same year, he also became European team champion and Italian singles champion.

In 1989, he retained the Italian singles title and won another world team championship alongside Renato Scacchioli, Andrea Bagnoli and Maurizio Mussini. In 1991, he won his fourth Italian singles championship and another world team gold medal, competing alongside Odorico, Bagnoli and Pietro Zovadelli.

In 1992, he won his second European team title in Budapest, alongside Odorico, Claudio Ricci and Cherubino Bertolatti. The following year, at Montreal, D'Alessandro faced Odorico in the world singles championship, losing their first encounter but winning the next two matches to claim the world title once again.

In 1994, D'Alessandro won the World Club Championship with De Merolis, while in 1995 he was part of the Italian national team that won the World Team Championship in Nuoro. In 1996, he won another World Club Championship with De Merolis, and that same year he was awarded the Collare d'oro al merito sportivo (Golden Collar for Sporting Merit) by the Italian National Olympic Committee (CONI) in recognition of his career.

At the 1997 World Championships held in the Republic of San Marino, he once again won the singles title.

In 2002, D'Alessandro decided to leave the Italian national team, although he continued competing at club level until 2008, when he ended his playing career with Monastier Treviso.

From 2009 to 2016, he worked within the Federazione Italiana Bocce as the official responsible for the national teams, overseeing the activities of raffa, volo and pétanque. During his career, he had also coached several players from Abruzzo at De Merolis who would later achieve international success, including Gianluca Formicone, Marco Di Nicola, Alfonso Nanni and Sebastiano Barbieri.

After leaving his position with the federation, D'Alessandro resumed competitive play despite his earlier retirement. In 2017, he was registered as a category A player with A.P.E.R. Capocavallo of Perugia, combining his playing activities with work on the federation's technical commission.

In 2025, at the age of 74, D'Alessandro was still competing in Serie A with Capriotti Mosciano, while in the following year he was still listed as a category A player with Moscianese.

== Honours ==
The following is a list of the main international titles won by Dante D'Alessandro.

=== World Championships ===
- Chiasso 1983 – Gold medal, singles raffa.
- Chiasso 1983 – Gold medal, triples raffa.
- Chiasso 1983 – Gold medal, team raffa.
- 1985 – Gold medal, team raffa.
- 1987 – Gold medal, singles raffa.
- 1987 – Gold medal, triples raffa.
- 1987 – Gold medal, team raffa.
- Lugano 1988 – Gold medal, singles raffa.
- 1989 – Gold medal, team raffa.
- Lugano 1991 – Gold medal, team raffa.
- Montreal 1993 – Gold medal, singles raffa.
- Nuoro 1995 – Gold medal, team raffa.
- San Marino 1997 – Gold medal, singles raffa.

=== World Club Championships ===
- 1994 – Gold medal, raffa, with De Merolis.
- 1996 – Gold medal, raffa, with De Merolis.

=== European Championships ===
- 1988 – Gold medal, team raffa.
- Budapest 1992 – Gold medal, team raffa.

== CONI honours ==
During his career, D'Alessandro received the following distinctions from the Italian National Olympic Committee (CONI):

- 1983 – Gold Medal for Athletic Valour (Medaglia d'oro al valore atletico), for winning the World Team Raffa Championship.
- 1989 – Bronze Medal for Athletic Valour (Medaglia di bronzo al valore atletico), for winning the Italian Singles Raffa Championship.
- 1989 – Gold Medal for Athletic Valour, for winning the World Team Raffa Championship.
- 1991 – Bronze Medal for Athletic Valour, for winning the Italian Singles Raffa Championship.
- 1991 – Gold Medal for Athletic Valour, for winning the World Team Raffa Championship.
- 1992 – Silver Medal for Athletic Valour (Medaglia d'argento al valore atletico), for winning the European Team Raffa Championship.
- 1993 – Gold Medal for Athletic Valour, for winning the World Singles Raffa Championship.
- 1995 – Gold Medal for Athletic Valour, for winning the World Team Raffa Championship.
- 1996 – Golden Collar for Sporting Merit (Collare d'oro al merito sportivo), in recognition of his sporting career.

== Bibliography ==
- Impiglia, Marco (2004). "Bocce". Enciclopedia dello Sport (in Italian). Istituto dell'Enciclopedia Italiana.
