= Fistball at the 2009 World Games =

Fistball competition at the World Games 2009 were held from July 17 to July 20 at the Chung Cheng Martial Arts Stadium in Kaohsiung, Taiwan.

== Schedule ==
July	16	17	18	19	20	21	22	23	24	25	26	Gold medals
Fistball					1							1

== Medal table ==
Rank	Nation	Gold	Silver	Bronze	Total
1	Brazil (BRA)	1	0	0	1
2	Switzerland (SUI)	0	1	0	1
3	Austria (AUT)	0	0	1	1
Totals (3 entries)		1	1	1	3

== Results ==
=== Preliminaries ===
Pos.	Team	SW
1	Brazil	15
2	Germany	12
3	Switzerland	12
4	Austria	10
5	Chile	5
6	Chinese Taipei	0

Hour	Game		
1st Rotation - Jul 17
10:45	Brazil	3 - 0	Chinese Taipei
11:45	Germany	3 - 0	Chile
12:45	Austria	1 - 3	Switzerland
2nd Rotation - Jul 17
14:30	Germany	3 - 0	Chinese Taipei
15:30	Austria	3 - 2	Chile
16:30	Brazil	3 - 2	Switzerland
3rd Rotation - Jul 18
10:45	Switzerland	3 - 0	Chile
11:45	Austria	3 - 0	Chinese Taipei
12:45	Brazil	3 - 1	Germany

Hour	Game		
4th Rotation - Jul 18
14:30	Chile	3 - 0	Chinese Taipei
15:30	Germany	3 - 1	Switzerland
16:30	Brazil	3 - 0	Austria
5th Rotation - Jul 19
10:45	Brazil	3 - 0	Chile
11:45	Germany	2 - 3	Austria
12:45	Switzerland	3 - 0	Chinese Taipei

=== Second phase ===
Hour	Game			
Jul 19
14:30	Intermediare Round	Austria	3 -0	Chile
15:45	Semifinal	Germany	3 - 4	Switzerland
Jul 20
11:30	Place 5	Chile	3 - 0	Chinese Taipei
13:00	Bronze medal Match	Germany	1 - 4	Austria
15:00	Final	Switzerland	1 - 4	Brazil

== Rankings ==
Rank	Team
Gold medal	Brazil
Silver medal	Switzerland
Bronze medal	Austria
4.	Germany
5.	Chile
6.	Chinese Taipei
