= Parachuting at the 2009 World Games =

Air sports at the 2009 World Games
- Venue: Kaohsiung Metropolitan Park
- Dates: 17–21 July 2009
- Competitors: 109 from 22 nations

The parachuting tournaments in air sports at the 2009 World Games in Kaohsiung was played between 17 and 21 July. 109 parachuters, from 22 nations, participated in the tournament. The parachuting competition took place in Kaohsiung Metropolitan Park.

== Participating nations ==
- Australia (7)
- Belgium (6)
- Brazil (1)
- Canada (7)
- Chinese Taipei (2)
- Czech Republic (1)
- Finland (1)
- France (14)
- Germany (5)
- Great Britain (6)
- Hungary (1)
- Italy (1)
- Malaysia (1)
- Norway (10)
- Poland (1)
- Russia (16)
- Slovakia (1)
- South Africa (1)
- South Korea (1)
- Spain (1)
- Sweden (9)
- United States (16)

== Medal table ==
Rank	Nation	Gold	Silver	Bronze	Total
1	United States	2	1	0	3
2	France	1	0	1	2
3	Canada	1	0	0	1
3	Germany	1	0	0	1
5	Russia	0	2	1	3
6	Norway	0	1	0	1
6	Slovenia	0	1	0	1
8	Australia	0	0	1	1
8	Brazil	0	0	1	1
8	Great Britain	0	0	1	1
Totals (10 entries)		5	5	5	15

== Events ==
Event	Gold	Silver	Bronze
Parachuting accuracy landing	Stefan Wiesner; Germany	Róbert Juriš; Slovakia	Liubov Ekshikeeva; Russia
Canopy piloting	Jay Moledzki; Canada	Nick Batsch; United States	Marat Leiras; Brazil
Canopy formation	United States; Chris Gay; Liz Godwin; Mark Gregory	Russia; Sergey Kulakov; Igor Pugachev; Sergey Vibe	Australia; Craig Bennett; Julia McConnel; Michael Vaughan
Freeflying	France; Cathy Bouette; Frédéric Fugen; Vincent Reffet	Norway; Håvard Flaat; Mathias Holtz; Kristian Moxnes	Great Britain; Mikey Carpenter; Alberto Fuertes; Adam Mattacola
Formation skydiving	United States; Andy Delk; Craig Girard; Mark Kirkby; Steve Nowak; Eliana Rodriguez	Russia; Michael Kuznetsov; Vladimir Pavlenko; Andrey Seliverstov; Oleg Shalamykhin; Sergey Shenin	France; Guillaume Bernier; Mathieu Bernier; Julien Degen; Fabrice Rieu; Jérémie Rollett
