= Artistic roller skating at the 2009 World Games =

- Venue: I-Shou University Gymnasium
- Dates: 21–22 July 2009
- Competitors: 34 from 13 nations

The artistic roller skating events at the 2009 World Games in Kaohsiung was played between 21 and 22 July. 34 roller skaters, from 13 nations, participated in the tournament. The artistic roller skating competition took place at I-Shou University Gymnasium.

== Participating nations ==
- Brazil (1)
- Chinese Taipei (6)
- Colombia (2)
- France (1)
- Germany (3)
- Great Britain (2)
- Italy (6)
- Japan (1)
- New Zealand (1)
- Slovenia (1)
- Spain (3)
- Switzerland (1)
- United States (6)

== Medal table ==
Rank	Nation	Gold	Silver	Bronze	Total
1	Italy	3	1	0	4
2	Spain	1	1	0	2
3	United States	0	1	1	2
4	Slovenia	0	1	0	1
5	Germany	0	0	2	2
6	Brazil	0	0	1	1
Totals (6 entries)		4	4	4	12

== Events ==
Event	Gold	Silver	Bronze
Men's singles	Carles Gasset; Spain	Roberto Riva; Italy	Marcel Stürmer; Brazil
Women's singles	Tanja Romano; Italy	Nika Arčon; Slovenia	Monika Lis; Germany
Dance	Italy; Gabriele Gasparini; Enrica Gasparini	Spain; Oscar Molins; Ayelén Morales	United States; Jonathan Cross; Erin Ovens
Pairs	Italy; Matteo Guarise; Sara Venerucci	United States; Robert Hines; Audrey Orcutt	Germany; Hannes Muschol; Christiane Reich
