= Squash at the 2009 World Games =

The Squash competition at the World Games 2009 took place from July 21 to July 24 at the Chung Cheng Martial Arts Stadium in Kaohsiung, Taiwan.

== Participating nations ==
- Australia (8)
- Austria (1)
- (British Virgin Islands) British Virgin Island (1)
- Canada (2)
- Chinese Taipei (2)
- Egypt (4)
- France (4)
- Germany (3)
- (United Kingdom) Great Britain (4)
- Guatemala (1)
- Hong Kong (4)
- Hungary (2)
- India (3)
- (Republic of Ireland) Ireland (1)
- Japan (2)
- Malaysia (7)
- Mexico (1)
- Netherlands (2)
- New Zealand (2)
- Russia (1)
- South Africa (2)
- South Korea (2)
- United States (1)

== Medals table ==
| Rank | Nation | Gold | Silver | Bronze | Total |
|---|---|---|---|---|---|
| 1 | Great Britain (GBR) | 1 | 1 | 0 | 2 |
| 2 | Malaysia (MAS) | 1 | 0 | 1 | 2 |
| 3 | Netherlands (NED) | 0 | 1 | 0 | 1 |
| 4 | Egypt (EGY) | 0 | 0 | 1 | 1 |
| Totals (4 entries) | | 2 | 2 | 2 | 6 |

== Medals summary ==
| Event | Gold | Silver | Bronze |
|---|---|---|---|
| Men's singles | (United Kingdom) Nick Matthew | (United Kingdom) James Willstrop | (Malaysia) Mohd Azlan Iskandar |
| Women's singles | (Malaysia) Nicol David | (Netherlands) Natalie Grinham | (Egypt) Omneya Abdel Kawy |
