= Water skiing at the 2009 World Games =

- Venue: Lotus Pond
- Dates: 22–26 July 2009
- Competitors: 81 from 29 nations

The water skiing events at the 2009 World Games in Kaohsiung was played between 22 and 26 July. 81 athletes, from 29 nations, participated in the tournament. The water skiing competition took place at Lotus Pond.

== Participating nations ==
- Australia (5)
- Belgium (3)
- Canada (6)
- Chile (1)
- China (4)
- Chinese Taipei (4)
- Colombia (1)
- Spain (1)
- Finland (1)
- France (4)
- Great Britain (3)
- Georgia (1)
- Germany (5)
- Greece (1)
- Hong Kong (2)
- Indonesia (2)
- Israel (1)
- Italy (3)
- Japan (4)
- Kuwait (2)
- Mexico (1)
- New Zealand (3)
- South Africa (4)
- Singapore (1)
- Slovakia (2)
- South Korea (4)
- Thailand (1)
- Ukraine (1)
- United States (10)

== Medal table ==
Rank	Nation	Gold	Silver	Bronze	Total
1	United States	4	2	2	8
2	Belgium	1	0	0	1
2	Chile	1	0	0	1
4	Australia	0	1	0	1
4	Canada	0	1	0	1
4	France	0	1	0	1
4	South Africa	0	1	0	1
8	Great Britain	0	0	1	1
8	Japan	0	0	1	1
8	Slovakia	0	0	1	1
8	Thailand	0	0	1	1
Totals (11 entries)		6	6	6	18

== Events ==
=== Men's events ===
Event	Gold	Silver	Bronze
Three event	Rodrigo Miranda; Chile	Storm Selsor; United States	Martin Bartalský; Slovakia
Barefoot three event	Keith St. Onge; United States	Heinrich Sam; South Africa	David Small; Great Britain
Wakeboard	Andrew Adkison; United States	Kyle Rattray; Canada	Padiwat Jaemjan; Thailand

=== Women's events ===
Event	Gold	Silver	Bronze
Three event	Kate Adriaensen; Belgium	Manon Costard; France	Caroline Hensley; United States
Barefoot three event	Elaine Heller; United States	Ashleigh Stebbeings; Australia	Shannon Heller; United States
Wakeboard	Dallas Friday; United States	Raimi Merritt; United States	Miku Asai; Japan
