= Cue sports at the 2009 World Games =

The cue sports competition at the 2009 World Games, including three-cushion billiards, nine-ball (a pool discipline) and snooker, took place from 22 to 26 July, at the Chung Cheng Martial Arts Stadium in Kaohsiung, Taiwan.

== Medal table ==
* Host nation (Chinese Taipei)

Rank	Nation	Gold	Silver	Bronze	Total
1	Great Britain (GBR)	2	1	0	3
2	Germany (GER)	1	0	0	1
2	Netherlands (NED)	1	0	0	1
4	Chinese Taipei (TPE)*	0	1	1	2
5	Austria (AUT)	0	1	0	1
5	Sweden (SWE)	0	1	0	1
7	France (FRA)	0	0	1	1
7	Italy (ITA)	0	0	1	1
7	United Arab Emirates (UAE)	0	0	1	1
Totals (9 entries)		4	4	4	12

== Medals summary ==
Event	Gold	Silver	Bronze
Three-cushion billiards – men's singles	Dick Jaspers (NED)	Torbjörn Blomdahl (SWE)	Marco Zanetti (ITA)
Nine-ball – men's singles	Ralf Souquet (GER)	Yang Ching-shun (TPE)	Stephan Cohen (FRA)
Nine-ball – women's singles	Allison Fisher (GBR)	Jasmin Ouschan (AUT)	Lin Yuan-chun (TPE)
Snooker – men's singles	Nigel Bond (GBR)	David Grace (GBR)	Mohammed Shehab (UAE)
