= Inline speed skating at the 2009 World Games =

- Venue: Yangming Skating Rink
- Dates: 17–19 July 2009
- Competitors: 60 from 18 nations

The inline speed skating events at the 2009 World Games in Kaohsiung was played between 17 and 19 July. Sixty roller skaters, from 18 nations, participated in the tournament. The competition took place at Yangming Skating Rink.

== Participating nations ==
- Australia (1)
- Belgium (3)
- Chile (2)
- Chinese Taipei (6)
- Colombia (9)
- Denmark (1)
- Ecuador (1)
- France (4)
- Germany (4)
- Italy (7)
- Japan (1)
- Netherlands (3)
- New Zealand (3)
- South Korea (7)
- Spain (3)
- Switzerland (2)
- United States (1)
- Venezuela (2)

== Medal table ==
Rank	Nation	Gold	Silver	Bronze	Total
1	Chinese Taipei	4	3	1	8
2	Colombia	3	4	3	10
3	South Korea	2	1	2	5
4	France	1	2	0	3
5	New Zealand	0	0	2	2
6	Italy	0	0	1	1
6	Venezuela	0	0	1	1
Totals (7 entries)		10	10	10	30

== Events ==
=== Men ===
Event	Gold	Silver	Bronze
300 m time trial	Lo Wei-lin; Chinese Taipei	Andrés Felipe Muñoz; Colombia	Pedro Causil; Colombia
500 m sprint	Andrés Felipe Muñoz; Colombia	Lo Wei-lin; Chinese Taipei	Lee Myung-kyu; South Korea
1000 m sprint	Pedro Causil; Colombia	Alexis Contin; France	Claudio Naselli; Italy
10,000 m points elimination race	Yann Guyader; France	Nelson Garzón; Colombia	Daniel Álvarez; Venezuela
15,000 m elimination race	Jorge Luis Cifuentes; Colombia	Yann Guyader; France	Andrés Felipe Muñoz; Colombia

=== Women ===
Event	Gold	Silver	Bronze
300 m time trial	Huang Yu-ting; Chinese Taipei	Hsu Chiao-jen; Chinese Taipei	Lim Jin-seon; South Korea
500 m sprint	Huang Yu-ting; Chinese Taipei	Lim Jin-seon; South Korea	Jercy Puello; Colombia
1000 m sprint	Huang Yu-ting; Chinese Taipei	Hsu Chiao-jen; Chinese Taipei	Nicole Begg; New Zealand
10,000 m points elimination race	Woo Hyo-sook; South Korea	Marta Ramírez; Colombia	Nicole Begg; New Zealand
15,000 m elimination race	Woo Hyo-sook; South Korea	Marta Ramírez; Colombia	Pan Yi-chin; Chinese Taipei
