= Tchoukball at the 2009 World Games =

The tchoukball competition at the 2009 World Games took place from July 24 to July 26, at the National Kaohsiung Normal University Gymnasium in Kaohsiung, Taiwan.

== Men ==
=== Preliminary round ===
Rank	Team	Pld	W	L	GF	GA	Pts	(Chinese Taipei)	(Switzerland)	(Singapore)	(United Kingdom)	(Canada)	(Macau)
1	Chinese Taipei	5	5	0	351	196	10	~	76:50	71:36	78:53	62:29	64:28
2	Switzerland	5	4	1	284	235	8	50:76	~	63:52	55:52	55:33	61:22
3	Singapore	5	3	2	261	256	6	36:71	52:63	~	53:48	50:47	70:27
4	Great Britain	5	2	3	271	242	4	53:78	52:55	48:53	~	48:40	70:16
5	Canada	5	1	4	198	243	2	29:62	33:55	47:50	40:48	~	49:28
6	Macau	5	0	5	121	314	0	28:64	22:61	27:70	16:70	28:49	~

=== Play Offs ===
==== 5th place match ====
July 26	Canada	53:26	Macau

==== Bronze medal match ====
July 26	Singapore	46:42	Great Britain

==== Gold medal match ====
July 26	Chinese Taipei	67:39	Switzerland

== Women ==
=== Preliminary round ===
Rank	Team	Pld	W	L	GF	GA	Pts	(Chinese Taipei)	(Switzerland)	(United Kingdom)	(Canada)	(Singapore)
1	Chinese Taipei	5	4	0	245	111	8	~	48:38	65:29	57:22	75:22
2	Switzerland	5	3	1	193	147	6	38:48	~	48:37	44:31	63:31
3	Great Britain	5	2	2	148	183	4	29:65	37:48	~	35:30	47:40
4	Canada	5	1	3	124	169	2	22:57	31:44	30:35	~	41:33
5	Singapore	5	0	4	126	226	0	22:75	31:63	40:47	33:41	~

=== Play Offs ===
==== Bronze medal match ====
July 26	Great Britain	33:45	Canada

==== Gold medal match ====
July 26	Chinese Taipei	50:37	Switzerland
