= Ju-jitsu at the 2009 World Games =

- Venue: National Sun Yat-Sen University Gymnasium
- Dates: 21–22 July 2009
- Competitors: 115 from 19 nations

The ju-jitsu events at the 2009 World Games in Kaohsiung was played between 21 and 22 July. 115 athletes, from 19 nations, participated in the tournament. The ju-jitsu competition took place at National Sun Yat-Sen University Gymnasium.

== Participating nations ==
- Austria (11)
- Belgium (6)
- Bulgaria (2)
- Chinese Taipei (4)
- Denmark (3)
- France (17)
- Germany (17)
- Iraq (1)
- Israel (3)
- Italy (8)
- Kazakhstan (4)
- Montenegro (2)
- Netherlands (14)
- Poland (3)
- Russia (7)
- Singapore (1)
- Sweden (1)
- Switzerland (9)
- Ukraine (2)

== Medal table ==
| Rank | Nation | Gold | Silver | Bronze | Total |
|---|---|---|---|---|---|
| 1 | France | 4 | 0 | 4 | 8 |
| 2 | Germany | 2 | 2 | 1 | 5 |
| 3 | Russia | 1 | 2 | 1 | 4 |
| 4 | Netherlands | 1 | 1 | 1 | 3 |
| 5 | Switzerland | 1 | 1 | 0 | 2 |
| 6 | Austria | 1 | 0 | 1 | 2 |
| 7 | Chinese Taipei | 0 | 2 | 0 | 2 |
| 8 | Denmark | 0 | 1 | 0 | 1 |
| 8 | Italy | 0 | 1 | 0 | 1 |
| 10 | Belgium | 0 | 0 | 1 | 1 |
| 10 | Kazakhstan | 0 | 0 | 1 | 1 |
| Totals (11 entries) | | 10 | 10 | 10 | 30 |

== Events ==
=== Duo ===
| Event | Gold | Silver | Bronze |
|---|---|---|---|
| Men | Switzerland; Remo Müller; Pascal Müller | Germany; Richard Hohenacker; Juri Hatzenbühler | France; Aurélien Dubois; Jordane Dubois |
| Women | Austria; Maria Schreil; Marion Tremel | Italy; Sara Paganini; Linda Ragazzi | France; Patricia Floquet; Isabelle Bacon |
| Mixed | France; Nicolas Péréa; Aurore Péréa | Switzerland; David Wernli; Joëlle Kempf | Belgium; Yazid Dalaa; Wendy Driesen |

=== Men's fighting ===
| Event | Gold | Silver | Bronze |
|---|---|---|---|
| −69 kg | Julien Boussuge; France | Mathias Willard; Denmark | Fedor Serov; Russia |
| −77 kg | Igor Rudnev; Russia | Mario Staller; Germany | Percy Kunsa; France |
| −85 kg | Andreas Kuhl; Germany | Dmitry Nebolsin; Russia | Matthias Gastgeb; Austria |
| −94 kg | Rob Haans; Netherlands | Sergey Kunashov; Russia | Vincent Parisi; France |

=== Women's fighting ===
| Event | Gold | Silver | Bronze |
|---|---|---|---|
| −55 kg | Annabelle Reydy; France | Li Ching-yi; Chinese Taipei | Aizhan Kukuzova; Kazakhstan |
| −62 kg | Sabrina Hatzky; Germany | Yang Hsien-tzu; Chinese Taipei | Irene Baars; Netherlands |
| −70 kg | Mélanie Lavis; France | Lindsay Wyatt; Netherlands | Sonja Kinz; Germany |
