= Air sports at the World Games =

Air sports with the discipline parachuting were introduced as World Games sports at the 1997 World Games in Lahti. At the 2013 World Games in Cali, paragliding was staged for the only time. At the 2017 World Games in Wrocław, paramotoring and gliding were contested for the only time. At the 2022 World Games in Birmingham, drone racing was introduced and will also be held in 2025.

== Parachuting ==
=== Men ===
==== Accuracy Landing ====
Games	Gold	Silver	Bronze
1997 Lahti	Ivan Hovorka (CZE)	Chen Junbo (CHN)	Oleg Fomin (BLR)

==== Freestyle ====
Games	Gold	Silver	Bronze
1997 Lahti	Saudi Arabia (KSA)	United States (USA)	France (FRA)
2001 Akita	United States (USA)	France (FRA)	United States (USA)

=== Women ===
==== Accuracy Landing ====
Games	Gold	Silver	Bronze
1997 Lahti	Irena Avbelj (SLO)	Lai Xiaoli (CHN)	Monika Filipowska (POL)

==== Freestyle ====
Games	Gold	Silver	Bronze
1997 Lahti	United States (USA)	Japan (JPN)	Switzerland (SUI)
2001 Akita	Italy (ITA)	Japan (JPN)	Italy (ITA)

=== Mixed ===
==== Accuracy Landing ====
Games	Gold	Silver	Bronze
2001 Akita	Marco Pflüger (GER)	Wang Jianming (CHN)	Wei Ning (CHN)
2005 Duisburg	István Asztalos (HUN)	Stefan Wiesner (GER)	Savas Kocyigit (TUR)
2009 Kaohsiung	Stefan Wiesner (GER)	Robert Juris (SVK)	Liubov Ekshikeeva (RUS)

==== Canopy Formation, 2-way ====
Games	Gold	Silver	Bronze
2009 Kaohsiung	United States (USA)	Russia (RUS)	Australia (AUS)

==== Canopy Piloting ====
Games	Gold	Silver	Bronze
2005 Duisburg	Jason Moledzki (CAN)	Shannon Pilcher (USA)	Clint Clawson (USA)
2009 Kaohsiung	Jason Moledzki (CAN)	Nicholas Batsch (USA)	Marat Leiras (BRA)
2013 Cali	Curtis Bartholomew (USA)	Thomas Dellibac (USA)	Pablo Hernández (ESP)
2017 Wrocław	Nicolas Batsch (USA)	Curtis Bartholomew (USA)	Cornelia Mihai (UAE)
2022 Birmingham	Cedric Veiga Rios (FRA)	Nicholas Batsch (USA)	Abdulbari Qubaisi (UAE)

==== Formation Skydiving, 4-way ====
Games	Gold	Silver	Bronze
1997 Lahti	United States (USA)	France (FRA)	South Africa (RSA)
2001 Akita	United States (USA)	Norway (NOR)	France (FRA)
2005 Duisburg	United States (USA)	Russia (RUS)	Italy (ITA)
2009 Kaohsiung	United States (USA)	Russia (RUS)	France (FRA)

==== Freeflying ====
Games	Gold	Silver	Bronze
2005 Duisburg	France (FRA)	Germany (GER)	United States (USA)
2009 Kaohsiung	France (FRA)	Norway (NOR)	Great Britain (GBR)

==== Freestyle ====
Games	Gold	Silver	Bronze
2005 Duisburg	Denmark (DEN)	France (FRA)	Japan (JPN)

== Paragliding ==
=== Men ===
==== Accuracy Landing ====
Games	Gold	Silver	Bronze
2013 Cali	Matjaž Ferarič (SLO)	Tomáš Lednik (CZE)	Tanapat Luangiam (THA)

=== Women ===
==== Accuracy Landing ====
Games	Gold	Silver	Bronze
2013 Cali	Jolanta Romanenko (LTU)	Nunnapat Phuchong (THA)	Milica Marinkovic (SRB)

== Paramotoring ==
=== Mixed ===
==== Paramotor Slalom ====
Games	Gold	Silver	Bronze
2017 Wrocław	Wojciech Bógdał (POL)	Kittiphob Phrommat (THA)	Marcin Bernat (POL)

== Gliding ==
=== Mixed ===
==== Glider Aerobatics ====
Games	Gold	Silver	Bronze
2017 Wrocław	Ferenc Tóth (HUN)	Luca Bertossio (ITA)	Eugen Schaal (GER)

== Drone racing ==
=== Mixed ===
==== First Person View ====
Games	Gold	Silver	Bronze
2022 Birmingham	Killian Rousseau; France	Paweł Laszczak; Poland	Alejandro Zamora; Spain
2025 Chengdu	Yuki Hashimoto; Japan	Kwan Chun Yan; Hong Kong	Kim Min-jae; South Korea
