= Jolanta Romanenko =

Lithuanian paraglider pilot

Medal record

Women's paragliding

Representing Lithuania

World Games
Gold medal – first place	2013 Cali	Accuracy

European Championships
Silver medal – second place	2012 Ohrid	Accuracy

Jolanta Romanenko (born 6 June 1971) is a Lithuanian female paraglider pilot.

In 2013, Romanenko won first ever paragliding accuracy precision landing title in World Games.
