= Aerobic gymnastics at the 2009 World Games =

The aerobic gymnastics competition at the 2009 World Games were held from July 24 to July 25.

== Medals table ==
Rank	Nation	Gold	Silver	Bronze	Total
1	China (CHN)	1	1	2	4
2	France (FRA)	1	1	1	3
3	Romania (ROU)	1	1	0	2
3	Spain (ESP)	1	1	0	2
5	Brazil (BRA)	1	0	0	1
6	New Zealand (NZL)	0	1	0	1
7	Russia (RUS)	0	0	2	2
Totals (7 entries)		5	5	5	15

== Medals summary ==
Event	Gold	Silver	Bronze
Individual men	(Spain) Ivan Parejo	(France) Morgan Jacquemin	(Russia) Alexander Kondratichev
Pairs mixed	(France) Julien Chaninet; Aurelie Joly	(Spain) Vicente Lli; Sara Moreno	(China) Shijian He; Jinxuan Huang
Individual women	(Brazil) Marcela Lopez	(New Zealand) Angela Mcmillan	(China) Huang Jinxuan
Trio men	(Romania) Mircea Brinzea; Tudorel-Valentin Mavrodineanu; Mircea Zamfir	(China) Tao Le; Che Lei; Zhang Peng	(France) Benjamin Garavel; Nicolas Garavel; Morgan Jacquemin
Group men	China	Romania	Russia
