= Tug of war at the 2009 World Games =

Tournament in Sizihwan, Kaohsiung, Taiwan

A tug of war tournament was held on July 18–19 during the 2009 World Games at the Gymnasium of the Guo-Guang Laboratory School in National Sun Yat-sen University. The outdoor tournament took place during both days, while the indoor tournament was held only on July 19.

== Medals table ==
Rank	Nation	Gold	Silver	Bronze	Total
1	Netherlands (NED)	1	1	1	3
2	Switzerland (SUI)	1	1	0	2
3	Chinese Taipei (TPE)	1	0	0	1
4	United Kingdom (UKB)	0	1	2	3
Totals (4 entries)		3	3	3	9

== Medal summary ==
items	First	Second	Third
Indoor Female 520 kg level（Detail）	Chinese Taipei (TPE)	Netherlands (NED)	United Kingdom (GBR)
Outdoor Male 640 kg level（Detail）	Switzerland (SUI)	United Kingdom (GBR)	Netherlands (NED)
Outdoor Male 680 kg level（Detail）	Netherlands (NED)	Switzerland (SUI)	United Kingdom (GBR)
