= Air sports at the 2013 World Games =

- Dates: 3–4 August 2013

The air sports competition at the 2013 World Games was held from August 3 to August 4 in Cali, Colombia.

== Medal summary ==
=== Medal table ===
| Rank | Nation | Gold | Silver | Bronze | Total |
|---|---|---|---|---|---|
| 1 | United States (USA) | 1 | 1 | 0 | 2 |
| 2 | Lithuania (LTU) | 1 | 0 | 0 | 1 |
| 2 | Slovenia (SLO) | 1 | 0 | 0 | 1 |
| 4 | Thailand (THA) | 0 | 1 | 1 | 2 |
| 5 | Czech Republic (CZE) | 0 | 1 | 0 | 1 |
| 6 | Serbia (SER) | 0 | 0 | 1 | 1 |
| 6 | Spain (ESP) | 0 | 0 | 1 | 1 |
| Totals (7 entries) | | 3 | 3 | 3 | 9 |

=== Events ===
| Event | Gold | Silver | Bronze |
|---|---|---|---|
| Men's paragliding accuracy | Matjaž Ferarič; Slovenia | Tomáš Lednik; Czech Republic | Tanapat Luangiam; Thailand |
| Women's paragliding accuracy | Jolanta Romanenko; Lithuania | Nunnapat Phuchong; Thailand | Milica Marinković; Serbia |
| Open parachuting canopy piloting | Curt Bartholomew; United States | Tommy Dellibac; United States | Pablo Hernández; Spain |
