= Tchoukball =

Indoor team sport

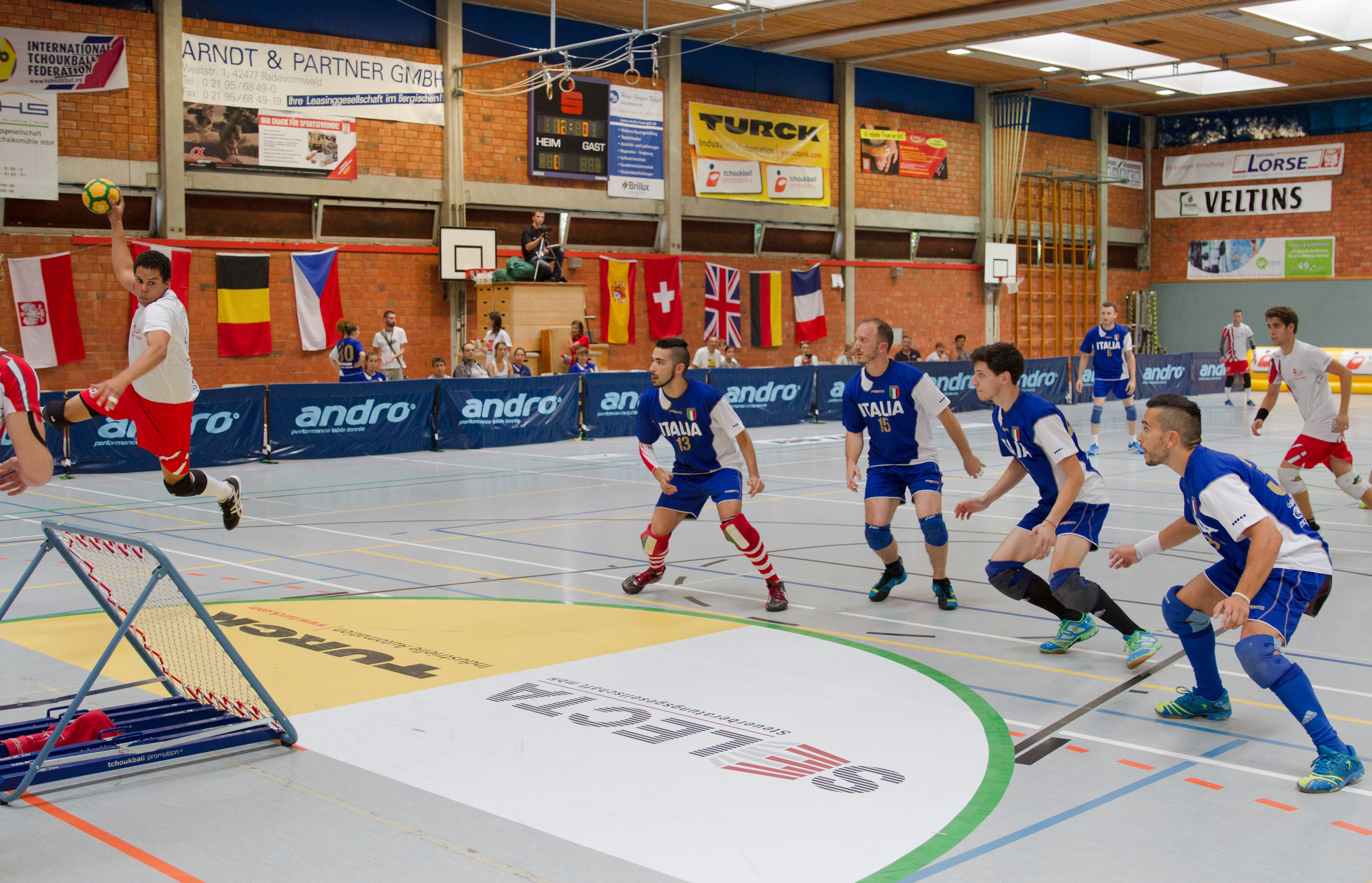
- A tchoukball match in progress.
- Highest governing body: International Tchoukball Federation (1971)
- First played: 1970

Characteristics
- Contact: No
- Team members: 7
- Mixed-sex: Not in international championships, but very common in some national championships
- Type: Ball sport, team sport
- Equipment: Tchoukball, rebounder

Presence
- Country or region: Worldwide
- Olympic: No
- World Games: Invitational sport at 2009 World Games

Tchoukball (/ˈtʃuːkbɔːl/ CHOOK-ball) is an indoor team sport, played by teams of 7 players. It was developed in Switzerland in the 1970s, and is most popular in Singapore, Switzerland and Taiwan, but has become an international sport with national federations in over 60 countries. It is governed by the International Tchoukball Federation (FITB), which was founded in 1971.

It is usually played with a ball on an indoor court with a small elastic rebounder on each end. Teams score by bouncing the ball against the rebounder and getting it to bounce on the floor of the court without being intercepted by the defending team. The sport was designed to limit injuries, and physical contact between players is prohibited.

== History ==
Tchoukball was created in Switzerland by Hermann Brandt, who was concerned by the numerous serious injuries among athletes resulting from sports prone to aggression and physical contact. He believed that sports should be not only for champions, but also contribute to the creation of a better and more humane society. He designed tchoukball to contain elements of handball (it is played with hands, and the balls used are similar), volleyball (as the defending team must prevent the ball from falling) and squash (since there is a rebound).

== Etymology ==
The name of tchoukball (pronounced as "choukball", with a silent "t") comes from the onomatopoeic "tchouk" sound the ball makes when it bounces off a frame.

== Basic rules ==
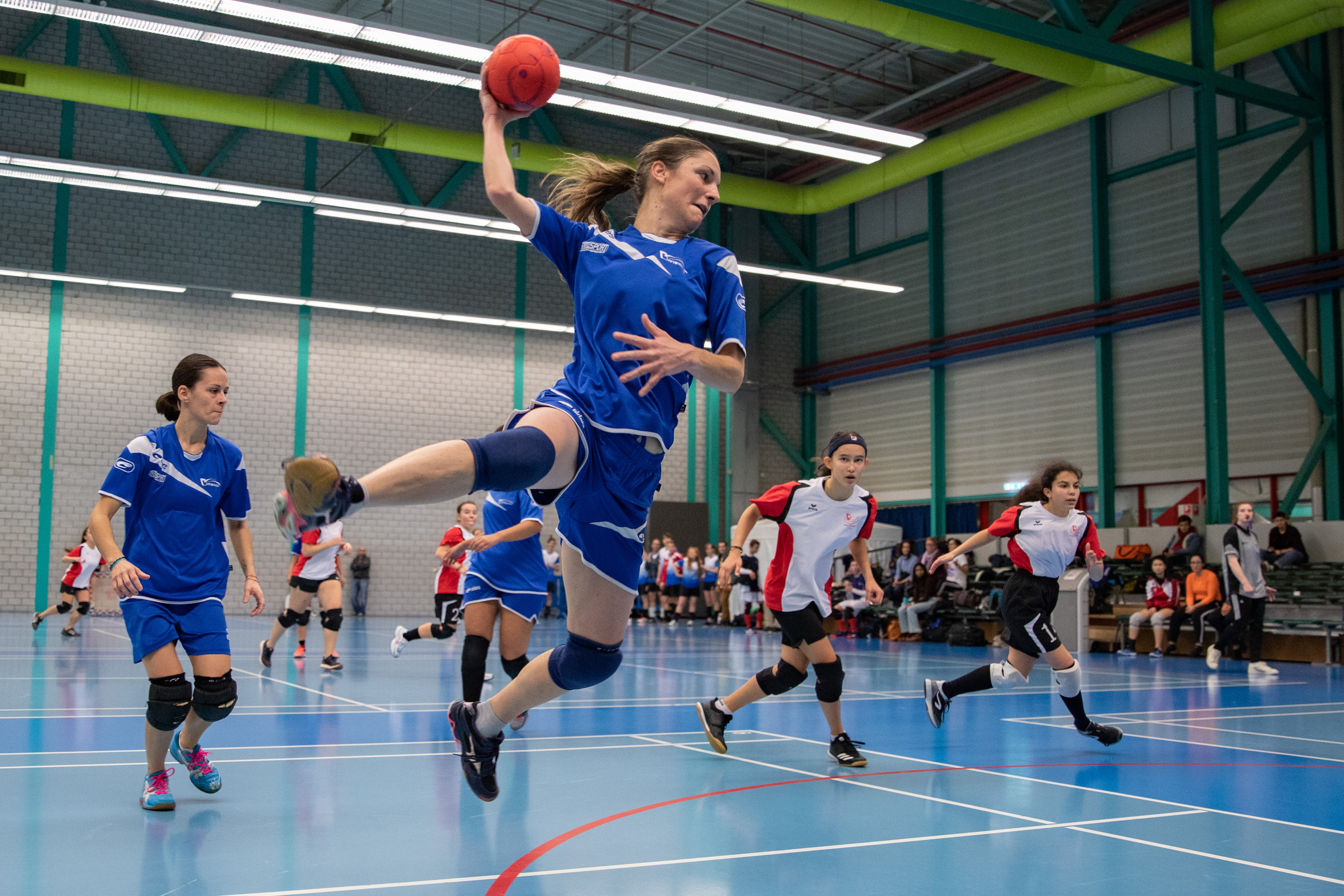
Match in progress in Geneva Nations Cup: 5th place women semi-final Switzerland M18-France.

Teams may comprise 12 players, however only 7 may be on the court at any one time.

Physical contact between players is prohibited, and defenders may not attempt to intercept the attacking team's passes. Players may take at most three steps with the ball, and hold the ball for at most three seconds. Teams may not pass the ball more than three times before shooting at the rebounder.

Court

- The court size that is generally used is 27 m × 16 m. However, there are variations to this such as in beach tchoukball where a court size of 21 m × 12 m is used.
- One rebounder is placed at each end of the field of play, one square meter in area.
- In front of each rebounder, a D-shaped semi-circle measuring 3 m in radius is drawn; this defines the limits of a 'forbidden zone' where defenders cannot stand.
- The lines around zones are considered part of the zone: the line marking the semicircle forbidden zone is considered part of the forbidden zone, and the line around the entire court is considered a part of the court.

Ball

Depending on the category of players (Men, Women, Youth), different sizes of balls are used. These range from a circumference of 54 – 60 cm and weights from 325 – 475 grams.

Scoring

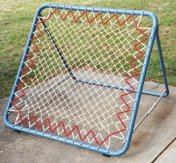
Rebounder

Two teams of 7 players each (men or women) compete to score points with the team with the most points at the end winning the game. When a team gains a point, control of the ball is transferred to the other team.

- In tchoukball either team can score at either end of the court.
- A point is scored when the ball rebounds after hitting either of the 2 rebounders and touches the ground outside the forbidden zone, any part of the defending player's body below the knees, or touches the defending player while he is still in the forbidden zone.
- A point is given to the non-attacking team when the attacking team shoots and misses the rebounder, or the ball rebounds outside the playing area (either out of the court or in the forbidden zone).
- If a shot is caught by the defending team, the defending team can proceed to attack immediately.

== Positions ==
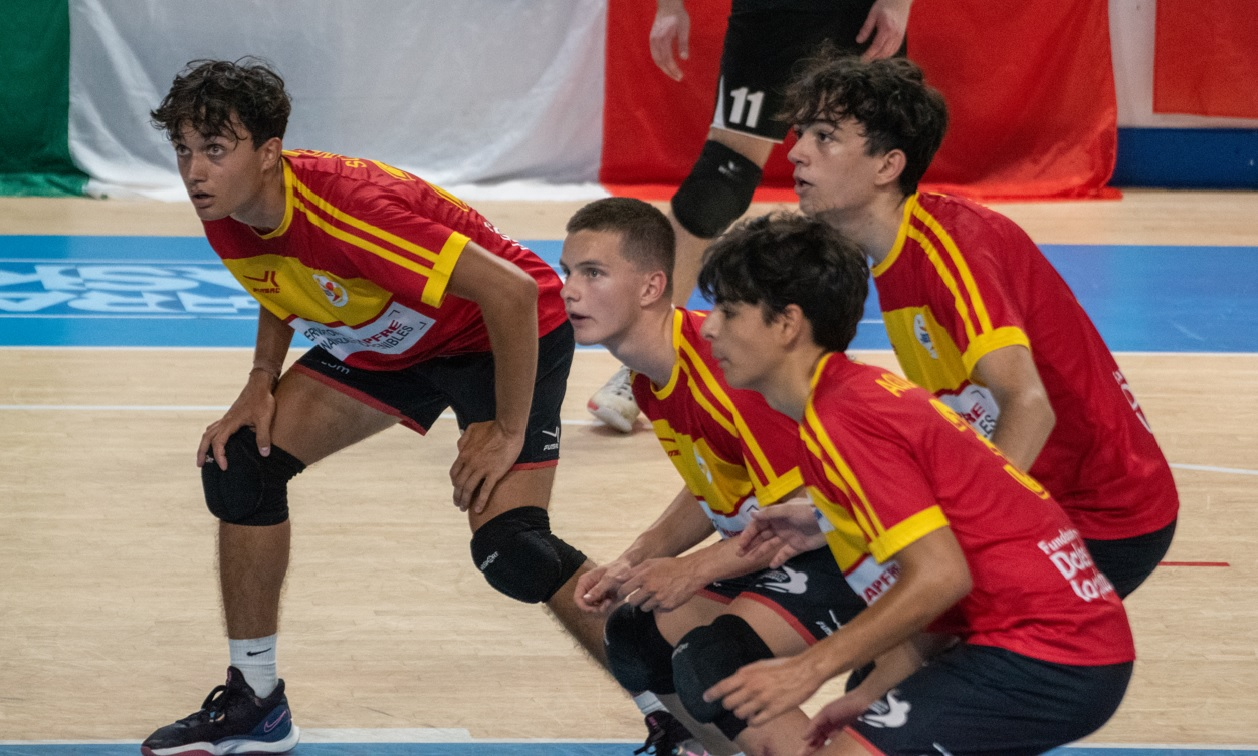
Defence prepared for the Germany-Spain match for third and fourth place at the Ferrara 2024 European Championship.

Each team comprises the following positions: 2 Right Shooters or Right Wings; 2 Left Shooters or Left Wings; 2 or 3 defenders or Forward Pivot; 1 Centre or Centre Pivot (or none if 3 defenders are used).

Each side of the court comprises a left shooter, right shooter and 1 or 2 defenders, while the centre usually stays near the middle of the court if this formation is used. The shooters are generally in charge of shooting although in some cases the defender can also take the shot. The defenders are in charge of coordinating the first line of defence while the centre pivot takes charge of the second line of defence. However other formations include not using a centre pivot, the team would bypass the centre and throw full length court passes directly to the shooters/inners. This gives an extra first line defender or a dedicated second line defender.

== Playing the game ==
Players with the ball can take a maximum of 3 steps, and hold the ball for a maximum of 3 seconds. Bouncing the ball is not allowed.

When a pass is not completed (the ball touches the ground or goes out of bounds), the other team gets possession.

The defending team cannot obstruct the attacking one during passing.

For the scoring team, stepping into the forbidden zone with the ball is not allowed. The ball must be released before the player lands in the forbidden zone.

In addition to classic indoor tchoukball, there is also beach tchoukball and wheelchair tchoukball, with slightly different rules. There are also Youth and University leagues, separate from the open league.

== International Tchoukball Federation (FITB) ==
Symbol of Tchoukball

The FITB, founded in 1971, is based in Geneva, Switzerland. As of 2021, it includes 50 member associations and 22 (15+7) countries with a designated FITB Representative. It supports and advises national associations and individuals willing to spread tchoukball in new areas. For instance, tchoukball was recently integrated in the school program of some regions of Senegal. The FITB was a demonstration sport in the 2009 World Games, which took place in Kaohsiung, Taiwan.

At the world championship level, tchoukball has been dominated by Taiwanese teams since 1980. Their only losses since then were in 2004 when they were defeated by Switzerland in the men's final, and in 2023, when Italy defeated them in the women's semi-final.

=== Membership ===
1. Argentina
2. Austria
3. Bangladesh
4. Benin
5. Brazil
6. Burkina Faso
7. Cameroon
8. Canada
9. Chinese Taipei
10. Colombia
11. Ivory Coast
12. Czech Republic
13. Democratic Republic of the Congo
14. France
15. Germany
16. Ghana
17. Guinea
18. Haiti
19. Hong Kong
20. Hungary
21. India
22. Indonesia
23. Italy
24. Japan
25. Kenya
26. Macau
27. Malaysia
28. Mauritius
29. Mexico
30. Morocco
31. Nepal
32. Pakistan
33. Philippines
34. Poland
35. Rwanda
36. Senegal
37. Singapore
38. South Korea
39. Spain
40. Sri Lanka
41. Switzerland
42. Tanzania
43. Thailand
44. Togo
45. Uganda
46. United Arab Emirates
47. United Kingdom
48. United States
49. Uruguay
50. Vietnam

=== Events ===
- World Federation
1. World Championship
2. European Championship
3. Asia - Pacific Championship
4. African Championship
5. Pan American Championship
6. FITB World Youth Tchoukball Championships in 6 Categories: B18,B15,B12 and G18,G15,G12. 6th FITB World Youth Tchoukball Championships 2023

== World events ==
=== World Tchoukball Championships ===
| Year | Host | Men's winners | Women's winners |
|---|---|---|---|
| 1971 | Switzerland | France | - |
| 1976 | | | |
| 1980 | Switzerland | Chinese Taipei | Chinese Taipei |
| 1982 | France | Chinese Taipei | Chinese Taipei |
| 1984 | Taiwan | Chinese Taipei | Chinese Taipei |
| 1987 | Switzerland | Chinese Taipei | Chinese Taipei |
| 2000 | Geneva, Switzerland | Chinese Taipei | Chinese Taipei |
| 2004 | Taiwan | Switzerland | Chinese Taipei |
| 2011 | Italy | Chinese Taipei | Chinese Taipei |
| 2015 | Taiwan | Chinese Taipei | Chinese Taipei |
| 2019 | Malaysia | Chinese Taipei | Chinese Taipei |
| 2023 | Czech Republic | Chinese Taipei | Switzerland |

=== World Beach Tchoukball Championships ===
| Year | Host | Men's winners | Women's winners |
|---|---|---|---|
| 2005 | Switzerland | Chinese Taipei | Chinese Taipei |
| 2017 | Taiwan | Chinese Taipei | Chinese Taipei |
| 2025 | Indonesia | Chinese Taipei | Chinese Taipei |

=== Tchoukball at the World Games ===
| Year | Host | Men's winners | Women's winners |
|---|---|---|---|
| 1989 | Germany | Chinese Taipei | Chinese Taipei |
| 2009 | Taiwan | Chinese Taipei | Chinese Taipei |

=== World Youth Tchoukball Championships ===
6th FITB World Youth Tchoukball Championships 2023

| Year | Host | M-18 Boys winner | M-15 Boys winner | M-12 Boys winner | M-18 Girls winner | M-15 Girls winner | M-12 Girls winner |
|---|---|---|---|---|---|---|---|
| 2004 | Taiwan | Chinese Taipei | - | - | Chinese Taipei | - | - |
| 2011 | Austria | Italy | Singapore | Chinese Taipei | Chinese Taipei | Italy | - |
| 2013 | Taiwan | Chinese Taipei | Chinese Taipei | Chinese Taipei | Chinese Taipei | Chinese Taipei | Chinese Taipei |
| 2015 | Singapore | Singapore | Chinese Taipei | Chinese Taipei | Singapore | Chinese Taipei | Singapore |
| 2019 | Singapore | Chinese Taipei | Chinese Taipei | Chinese Taipei | Singapore | Chinese Taipei | Chinese Taipei |
| 2023 | Singapore | Chinese Taipei | Singapore | Chinese Taipei | Singapore | Chinese Taipei | Chinese Taipei |

=== World University Tchoukball Championships ===
| Year | Host | Men's winners | Women's winners |
|---|---|---|---|
| 2017 | Malaysia | Chinese Taipei | Chinese Taipei |

=== World Youth Beach Tchoukball Championships ===
| Year | Host | Men's winners | Women's winners |
|---|---|---|---|
| 2017 | Indonesia | Chinese Taipei | Chinese Taipei |
| 2023 | Taiwan | Chinese Taipei | Chinese Taipei |
| 2025 | Thailand | Chinese Taipei | Thailand |

== Regional events ==
=== Asia Pacific Tchoukball Championships ===
| Year | Host | Men's winners | Women's winners |
|---|---|---|---|
| 2003 | India | Chinese Taipei | Chinese Taipei |
| 2006 | Taiwan | Chinese Taipei | Chinese Taipei |
| 2008 | Taiwan | Chinese Taipei | Chinese Taipei |
| 2010 | Singapore | Chinese Taipei | Chinese Taipei |
| 2012 | Philippines | Chinese Taipei | Chinese Taipei |
| 2014 | Taiwan | Chinese Taipei | Chinese Taipei |
| 2016 | China | Chinese Taipei | Chinese Taipei |
| 2022 | Malaysia | Chinese Taipei | Singapore |
| 2024 | Hong Kong | Chinese Taipei | Hong Kong |
| 2026 | Taiwan | Singapore | Hong Kong |

=== Asia Pacific University Tchoukball Championships ===
| Year | Host | Men's winners | Women's winners |
|---|---|---|---|
| 2009 | Hong Kong | Chinese Taipei | Chinese Taipei |
| 2011 | Taiwan | Chinese Taipei | Chinese Taipei |
| 2013 | South Korea | Philippines | Chinese Taipei |
| 2015 | Malaysia | Chinese Taipei | Chinese Taipei |
| 2019 | Taiwan | Chinese Taipei | Chinese Taipei |

=== Asia Pacific Beach Tchoukball Championships ===
| Year | Host | Men's winners | Women's winners |
|---|---|---|---|
| 2013 | Thailand | Chinese Taipei | Singapore |

=== Asia Pacific Youth Tchoukball Championships ===
| Year | Host | M-19 Boys Winner | M-16 Boys Winner | M-13 Boys Winner | M-19 Girls Winner | M-16 Girls Winner | M-13 Girls Winner |
|---|---|---|---|---|---|---|---|
| 2010 | Singapore | Chinese Taipei | - | Hong Kong | Chinese Taipei | - | Chinese Taipei |
| 2012 | Malaysia | Chinese Taipei | Chinese Taipei | Chinese Taipei | Singapore | Chinese Taipei | Chinese Taipei |
| 2014 | Singapore | Chinese Taipei | Chinese Taipei | Chinese Taipei | Chinese Taipei | Chinese Taipei | Chinese Taipei |
| 2016 | Taiwan | Chinese Taipei | Chinese Taipei | Chinese Taipei | Chinese Taipei | Chinese Taipei | Chinese Taipei |

=== Southeast Asia Tchoukball Championships ===
| Year | Host Nation | Men's winners | Women's winners |
|---|---|---|---|
| 2009 | Thailand | Singapore | - |
| 2011 | Vietnam | Philippines | Singapore |
| 2013 | Thailand | Singapore | Singapore |
| 2015 | Malaysia | Singapore | Singapore |
| 2017 | Thailand | Singapore | Singapore |

=== South Asian Tchoukball Championships ===
| Year | Host | Men's winners | Women's winners |
|---|---|---|---|
| 2012 | Nepal | India | - |
| 2014 | Nepal | India | - |
| 2016 | India | India | - |

=== East Asian Tchoukball Championships ===
| Year | Host | Men's winners | Women's winners |
|---|---|---|---|
| 2016 | China | Chinese Taipei | - |
| 2017 | South Korea | | |

=== European Tchoukball Championships ===
| Year | Host | Men's winners | Women's winners |
|---|---|---|---|
| 2003 | Italy | Switzerland | Switzerland |
| 2006 | Switzerland | United Kingdom | Switzerland |
| 2008 | Czech Republic | Switzerland | Switzerland |
| 2010 | United Kingdom | Switzerland | Switzerland |
| 2014 | Germany | Austria | Switzerland |
| 2016 | Czech Republic | Austria | Switzerland |
| 2018 | Italy | Italy | Italy |
| 2022 | United Kingdom | Italy | Switzerland |
| 2024 | Italy | Italy | Italy |
| 2026 | Switzerland | Italy | Switzerland |

=== European Youth Tchoukball Championships ===
| Year | Host | M-18 Boys Winner | M-15 Boys Winner | M-12 Boys Winner | M-18 Girls Winner | M-15 Girls Winner | M-12 Girls Winner |
|---|---|---|---|---|---|---|---|
| 2016 | Czech Republic | Italy | Italy | Czech Republic | - | Austria | - |
| 2022 Championships | United Kingdom | Switzerland | | | | | |

=== African Tchoukball Championships ===
| Year | Host | Men's winners | Women's winners |
|---|---|---|---|
| 2010 | Ghana | Togo | Senegal |
| 2012 | Togo | Togo | |
| 2014 | Benin | Togo | |
| 2016 | Kenya | Cameroon | |

=== East African Tchoukball Championships ===
| Year | Host | Men's winners | Women's winners |
|---|---|---|---|
| 2014 | Uganda | Uganda | |

=== Pan American Tchoukball Championships ===
| Year | Host | Men's winners | Women's winners |
|---|---|---|---|
| 2010 | Brazil | Brazil | Brazil |
| 2012 | Uruguay | Brazil | Brazil |
| 2014 | Colombia | Brazil | Colombia |
| 2016 | Mexico | Brazil | Uruguay |
| 2018 | Argentina | Brazil | Uruguay |
| 2022 | Brazil | Brazil | Argentina |
| 2024 | Argentina | Uruguay | Uruguay |
| 2026 | Colombia | Colombia | Uruguay |

== FITB presidents ==
| Name | Nationality | Years | FITB headquarters |
|---|---|---|---|
| Hermann Brandt | Switzerland | 1971–1972 | Geneva, Switzerland |
| Théodore Werey | France | 1972–1984 | France |
| Liu Zhengfeng | Taiwan | 1984–1996 | Taoyuan, Taiwan |
| John Andrews | United Kingdom | 1996–2000 | United Kingdom |
| Michel Farve | Switzerland | 2000–2004 | Switzerland |
| Daniel Bushbeck | Switzerland | 2004–2009 | Geneva, Switzerland |
| Huang Chin Cheng | Taiwan | 2009–2017 | Kaohsiung, Taiwan |
| Fang Shen Szu | Taiwan | 2017–2021 | New Taipei, Taiwan |
| Huang Chin Cheng | Taiwan | 2021–2025 | Kaohsiung, Taiwan |
| Lim Zi Xuan, Delane | Singapore | 2025-present | Singapore, Singapore |

== See also ==
- Tchoukball at the 2009 World Games
