= All-time World Games medal table =

This is the all-time medal table of the World Games as of the 2025 edition. In the history of the games, Russia (2001, 2005, 2009 and 2017) has led the total medal count four times and Italy (1985, 1989 and 2013) three times. The United States (1981 and 1997) and Germany (1993 and 2022) have led the overall count twice each. China has led once in 2025. Ranked by gold, then silver and then bronze:

Rank	Nation	Gold	Silver	Bronze	Total
1	Italy (Note: The results from the 2001 World Games are from the archived website of the Akita, Japan, organizing committee.) (Note: Italy was stripped of a gold medal in women's muaythai and a bronze medal in women's powerlifting for doping at the 2022 World Games. This table reflects the reallocation of medals for those events.)	179	196	172	547
2	Germany (Note: In 2017, Germany was stripped of a gold medal in women's bowling for doping. This table reflects the reallocation of medals for that event.)	179	132	170	481
3	United States (Note: The 1997 bronze medalists in aerobics mixed pair were from Great Britain, not United States as stated in IWGA source.)	172	157	122	451
4	Russia (Note: The Soviet Union, which amassed 36 total medals in 1989, is counted separately from its successor states, including Russia. This is consistent with the separate counting of medals for other states that sub-divided into their constituent successor states following their initial participation in the World Games. These include Czechoslovakia (Czech Republic and Slovakia) and FR Yugoslavia (2001)/SUSM (2005) (Serbia and Montenegro).)	137	110	72	319
5	France	125	127	137	389
6	China	114	76	40	230
7	Ukraine (Note: In 2009, Ukraine was stripped of two gold medals in bodybuilding for doping, and Qatar and Brazil were each stripped of a silver medal. This table does not include those stripped medals, and neither does it include possible reallocation of those medals, as the results at the World Games website do not reflect a reallocation.)	74	73	68	215
8	Japan	72	61	70	203
9	Great Britain (Note: The 1981 mixed badminton title was won by a pair of players from Sweden and Great Britain. Both nations are counted as having won a gold medal.)	69	67	99	235
10	Spain	55	51	62	168
11	Sweden	50	47	59	156
12	Netherlands	47	50	60	157
13	Belgium	47	47	52	146
14	South Korea	47	26	37	110
15	Colombia	45	58	38	141
16	Hungary (Note: In 2009 and 2013, Hungary was stripped of a gold medal and a silver medal, respectively, in sumo for doping. This table reflects the reallocation of medals for these two events.)	38	29	37	104
17	Australia	37	56	53	146
18	Chinese Taipei	36	45	41	122
19	Switzerland	32	39	22	93
20	Canada	29	33	49	111
21	Denmark	28	14	18	60
22	Poland	24	26	32	82
23	Brazil	19	13	20	52
24	Austria	18	25	22	65
25	Norway	17	20	36	73
26	Mexico	16	14	21	51
27	Soviet Union	15	13	8	36
28	Bulgaria	15	6	13	34
29	Czech Republic	14	21	24	59
30	New Zealand	14	17	14	45
31	Belarus	14	8	27	49
32	Israel	13	8	15	36
33	Finland (Note: The 1993 bronze medalist in men's 75kg karate kumite was from Iran, not Finland as stated in IWGA source.)	12	25	24	61
34	Thailand	12	17	15	44
35	Egypt	9	16	23	48
36	Portugal	9	11	16	36
37	Indonesia	9	8	8	25
38	Kazakhstan	8	9	10	27
39	South Africa	7	14	18	39
40	Slovenia	7	14	14	35
41	Argentina	7	11	19	37
42	Slovakia	7	11	13	31
43	Croatia	6	11	11	28
44	Greece	6	11	9	26
45	Venezuela	5	10	13	28
46	Iran	5	10	7	22
47	Romania	5	10	5	20
–	Individual Neutral Athletes (Note: Athletes from Russia and Belarus competed at the 2025 World Games as independents.)	5	6	5	16
48	Malaysia	5	3	7	15
49	Vietnam	5	3	1	9
50	Moldova	5	0	0	5
51	Mongolia (Note: In 2013, Hungary was stripped of a silver medal in men's middleweight sumo due to doping. Mongolia was elevated to bronze due to medal reallocation. This table reflects the reallocation which is not counted in IWGA source.)	4	8	3	15
52	Turkey	4	7	12	23
53	Chile	4	7	7	18
54	Lithuania	4	5	9	18
55	Uzbekistan	4	5	7	16
56	Hong Kong	4	5	6	15
57	United Arab Emirates	4	4	8	16
58	Serbia	4	2	3	9
59	Azerbaijan	3	7	3	13
60	Estonia	3	5	2	10
61	Morocco	3	4	6	13
62	Ireland	3	4	5	12
63	Fiji	3	0	0	3
64	Philippines	2	7	7	16
65	Ecuador	2	4	6	12
66	Singapore	2	3	5	10
67	Bosnia and Herzegovina	2	1	3	6
68	Algeria	2	1	0	3
69	El Salvador	2	0	1	3
69	Tunisia	2	0	1	3
71	Cambodia	2	0	0	2
72	Jordan	1	3	3	7
72	Luxembourg	1	3	3	7
74	U.S. Virgin Islands	1	3	1	5
75	India (Note: IWGA source mistakenly attributed Liem Swie King who won a bronze medal from 1981 World Games as an athlete from India instead of Indonesia. This medal table reflects the correct count.)	1	2	6	9
76	Peru	1	2	4	7
77	Guatemala	1	2	2	5
78	Qatar	1	2	1	4
79	Brunei	1	2	0	3
80	Paraguay	1	1	0	2
81	Bolivia	1	0	1	2
81	Georgia	1	0	1	2
81	Saudi Arabia	1	0	1	2
84	Armenia	1	0	0	1
84	Benin	1	0	0	1
84	Costa Rica	1	0	0	1
87	Czechoslovakia	0	3	0	3
88	Bahrain	0	2	1	3
89	Kyrgyzstan	0	1	4	5
90	Ivory Coast	0	1	3	4
91	Dominican Republic	0	1	1	2
91	Latvia	0	1	1	2
91	Madagascar	0	1	1	2
94	Cuba	0	1	0	1
94	Cyprus	0	1	0	1
94	Lebanon	0	1	0	1
94	Liechtenstein	0	1	0	1
94	San Marino	0	1	0	1
99	Montenegro	0	0	4	4
100	Jamaica	0	0	2	2
101	Bahamas	0	0	1	1
101	Cameroon	0	0	1	1
101	FR Yugoslavia	0	0	1	1
101	Kuwait	0	0	1	1
101	Monaco	0	0	1	1
101	Namibia	0	0	1	1
101	Nigeria	0	0	1	1
101	Pakistan	0	0	1	1
101	Panama	0	0	1	1
Totals (109 entries)		2,003	1,979	2,071	6,053
