= Gianluca Formicone =

Italian raffa player

Personal information
- Nationality: Italian
- Born: 15 October 1971 (age 55) Atri, Italy

Sport
- Sport: Bocce
- Event: Raffa
Medal record
Representing Italy
World Championships
| Gold medal – first place | 2000 | Team |
| Gold medal – first place | 2003 Chiasso | Team |
| Gold medal – first place | 2007 | Team |
| Gold medal – first place | 2019 San Miguel de Tucumán | Individual |
| Silver medal – second place | 2005 Detroit | Individual |
| Bronze medal – third place | 2010 Rome | Individual |
World Club Championships
| Gold medal – first place | 1994 | De Merolis |
| Gold medal – first place | 1996 | De Merolis |
| Gold medal – first place | 2001 | Mediolanum |
| Gold medal – first place | 2002 | Mediolanum |
European Championships
| Gold medal – first place | 1996 Quéven | Team |
| Gold medal – first place | 2000 Spoleto | Team |
| Gold medal – first place | 2002 Terni | Team |
| Gold medal – first place | 2004 Livorno | Team |
| Gold medal – first place | 2006 Stuttgart | Team |
| Gold medal – first place | 2009 Ankara | Team |
| Gold medal – first place | 2016 Crema | Team |
| Gold medal – first place | 2016 Crema | Individual |
World Games
| Gold medal – first place | 2009 Kaohsiung | Pairs |
| Gold medal – first place | 2017 Wrocław | Pairs |
Mediterranean Games
| Gold medal – first place | 1997 Bari | Pairs |

Gianluca Formicone (born 15 October 1971) is an Italian bocce player specialising in raffa. He won the individual world championship in 2019, eight European titles and two gold medals at the World Games.

== Career ==
Formicone began playing bocce at the age of seven, initially using wooden balls near his home and later practising at the bocce facility in Notaresco, where his father would take him. His first significant competitive achievement came in 1989, when he won his first Italian championship, taking the national title in the category C raffa triples competition.

In 1994, while representing De Merolis of Teramo, he won the Italian category A pairs championship and his first World Club Championship. Two years later, he won another world club title with the same team from Abruzzo. That year, he also represented Italy at the European Team Championships held in Quéven, France.

Formicone represented Italy at the 1997 Mediterranean Games in Bari, where he partnered with Emiliano Benedetti to win the gold medal in raffa pairs, defeating the San Marino team of Corrado Bollini and Giuseppe Frisoni in the final.

In 2000, he won two international team titles, becoming European champion in Spoleto and world champion. He subsequently won consecutive World Club Championships with Mediolanum of Milan in 2001 and 2002. In 2002, he also won the European team title at the championships held in Terni, as well as two Italian category A titles, in the individual and pairs events. The following year, Formicone won another world team championship in Chiasso. This was followed by another European team title in Livorno in 2004, when he also won the Italian pairs championship.

In 2005, in addition to winning the Italian category A triples championship, Formicone competed in the individual World Championship in Detroit, where he reached the final but was defeated by Switzerland's Davide Bianchi, earning the silver medal. He subsequently won the European team championship in Stuttgart in 2006 and the world team championship in 2007. In 2008, Formicone added two more Italian category A titles to his record, in the individual and pairs competitions.

In 2009, partnering with Pasquale D'Alterio, he won the gold medal in raffa pairs at the 2009 World Games in Kaohsiung. That same year, at the European Championships in Ankara, he secured his sixth European team title. In 2010, he won the Italian category A1 individual championship and returned to the individual World Championships in Rome, where he earned the bronze medal, finishing behind Austria's Nicola Natale and Chile's Rodolfo Galvez.

At the 2016 European Championships in Crema, Formicone won two gold medals. He claimed the individual title by defeating Switzerland's Maurizio Dalle Fratte and also won the team competition alongside Giuseppe D'Alterio, Mirko Savoretti and Luca Viscusi.

In 2017, Formicone competed at the 2017 World Games in Wrocław, where he partnered with Giuliano Di Nicola to win his second gold medal at the event, defeating the San Marino pair of Enrico Dall'Olmo and Jacopo Frisoni in the final. In March 2019, he competed at the individual World Championship in San Miguel de Tucumán, Argentina, where he won the title by defeating Peru's Oswaldo Palomino 12–2 in the final. His victory brought the individual raffa world title back to Italy for the first time in eighteen years, following Emiliano Benedetti's triumph in 2001. Including the four World Club Championships he had won between 1994 and 2002, the title in Argentina was the eighth world title of his career.

Alongside his appearances for the Italian national team, Formicone continued competing at club level. In January 2026, he was registered with Bocciofila Vigasio, representing the club when he won his third Pallino d'Oro, an international invitational singles competition held in Budrione. He defeated Giuseppe D'Alterio 12–7 in the final.

== Honours ==
The following is a list of Formicone's major titles and medals.

=== World Championships ===
- 2000 – Gold medal, team raffa.
- Chiasso 2003 – Gold medal, team raffa.
- Detroit 2005 – Silver medal, individual raffa.
- 2007 – Gold medal, team raffa.
- Rome 2010 – Bronze medal, individual raffa.
- San Miguel de Tucumán 2019 – Gold medal, individual raffa.

=== World Club Championships ===
- 1994 – Gold medal, with De Merolis.
- 1996 – Gold medal, with De Merolis.
- 2001 – Gold medal, with Mediolanum.
- 2002 – Gold medal, with Mediolanum.

=== European Championships ===
- Quéven 1996 – Gold medal, team raffa.
- Spoleto 2000 – Gold medal, team raffa.
- Terni 2002 – Gold medal, team raffa.
- Livorno 2004 – Gold medal, team raffa.
- Stuttgart 2006 – Gold medal, team raffa.
- Ankara 2009 – Gold medal, team raffa.
- Crema 2016 – Gold medal, team raffa.
- Crema 2016 – Gold medal, individual raffa.

=== World Games ===
- Kaohsiung 2009 – Gold medal, pairs raffa.
- Wrocław 2017 – Gold medal, pairs raffa.

=== Mediterranean Games ===
- Bari 1997 – Gold medal, pairs raffa.

=== Italian Championships ===
- 1989 – Gold medal, triples raffa, category C.
- 1994 – Gold medal, pairs raffa, category A.
- 2002 – Gold medal, individual raffa, category A.
- 2002 – Gold medal, pairs raffa, category A.
- 2004 – Gold medal, pairs raffa, category A.
- 2005 – Gold medal, triples raffa, category A.
- 2008 – Gold medal, individual raffa, category A.
- 2008 – Gold medal, pairs raffa, category A.
- 2010 – Gold medal, individual raffa, category A1.

== CONI honours ==
During his career, Formicone received the following Medals for Athletic Valour from the Italian National Olympic Committee (CONI):

- 1994 – Bronze Medal for Athletic Valour, for winning the Italian pairs raffa championship.
- 1996 – Silver Medal for Athletic Valour, for winning the European team raffa championship.
- 1997 – Bronze Medal for Athletic Valour, for winning the Italian team raffa championship.
- 2000 – Gold Medal for Athletic Valour, for winning the world team raffa championship.
- 2000 – Silver Medal for Athletic Valour, for winning the European team raffa championship.
- 2002 – Bronze Medal for Athletic Valour, for winning the Italian individual, pairs and team raffa championships.
- 2002 – Silver Medal for Athletic Valour, for winning the European team raffa championship.
- 2003 – Gold Medal for Athletic Valour, for winning the world team raffa championship.
- 2004 – Bronze Medal for Athletic Valour, for winning the Italian pairs raffa championship.
- 2004 – Silver Medal for Athletic Valour, for winning the European team raffa championship.
- 2019 – Gold Medal for Athletic Valour, for winning the individual raffa world championship.
