= Kaohsiung City Lingya Sports Center =

Sports center in Lingya, Kaohsiung, Taiwan

- 高雄市苓雅運動中心
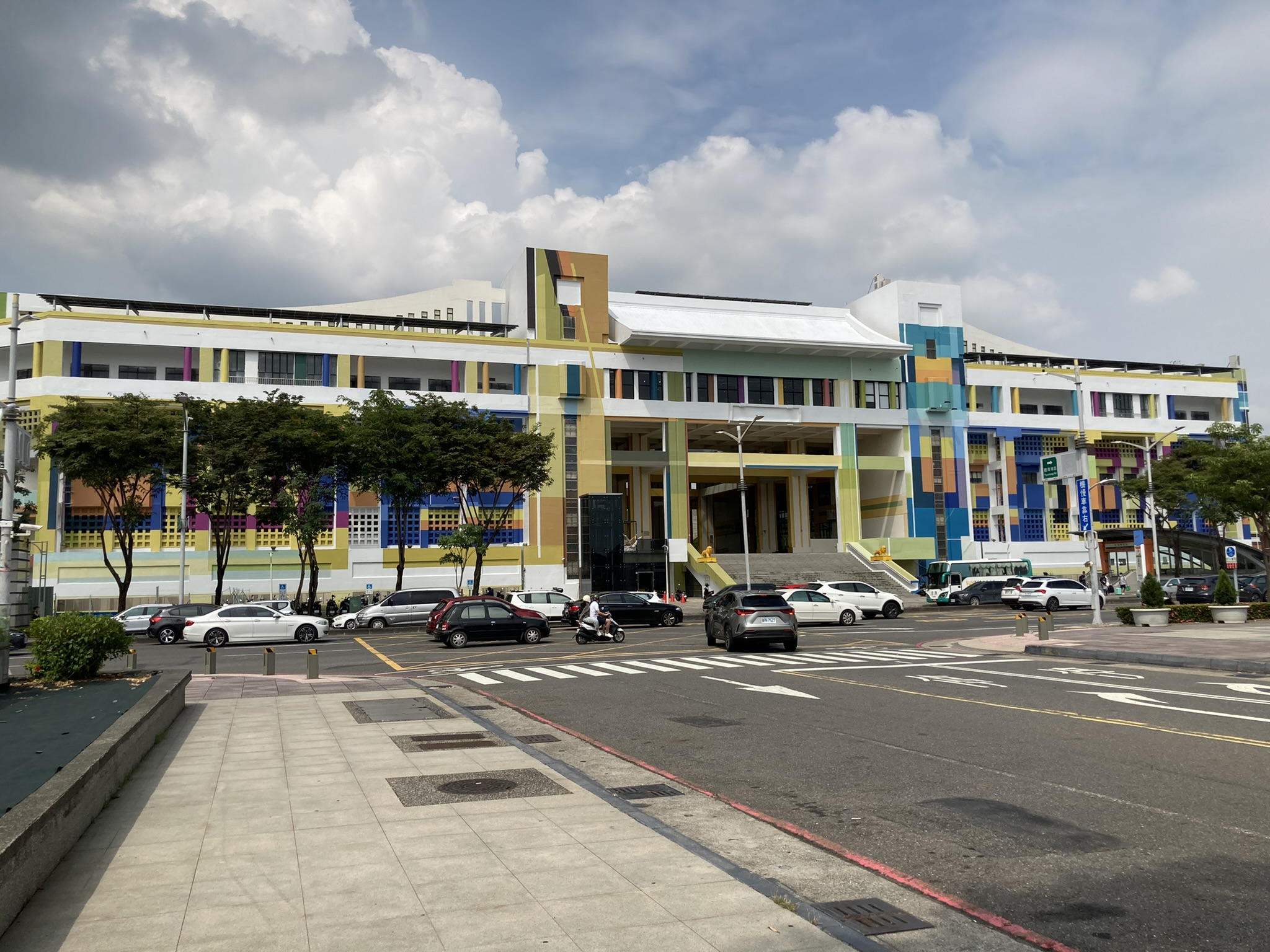
- Interactive map of Kaohsiung City Lingya Sports Center
- Location: Lingya, Kaohsiung, Taiwan
- Coordinates: 22°37′39.5″N 120°20′05.4″E
- Type: sports center

Website
- Official website (in Chinese)

The Kaohsiung City Lingya Sports Center (Chinese: 高雄市苓雅運動中心; pinyin: Gāoxióng Shì Língyǎ Yùndòng Zhōngxīn), originally the Chung Cheng Martial Arts Stadium (Chinese: 中正技擊館; pinyin: Zhōngzhèng Jìjīguǎn), is a sports center in Lingya District, Kaohsiung, Taiwan. The stadium was one of the venues for the World Games 2009.

== History ==
The stadium was originally constructed for the 1986 National Games as the Chung Cheng Martial Arts Stadium. It was later renamed to Kaohsiung City Lingya Sports Center.

== Structure ==
The stadium is separated into the Eastern and Western Zone with three halls in each of them of an area 620 m^{2} each. The audience stage can accommodate 1,400 people each with a total capacity of 7,000 seats.

== Transportation ==
The sports center is accessible from exit 4 of the Lingya Sports Park Station of the Kaohsiung MRT.

== See also ==
- List of stadiums in Taiwan
