= 228 Peace Memorial Park =

Park in Taipei, Taiwan

Coordinates: 25°2′30″N 121°30′53″E

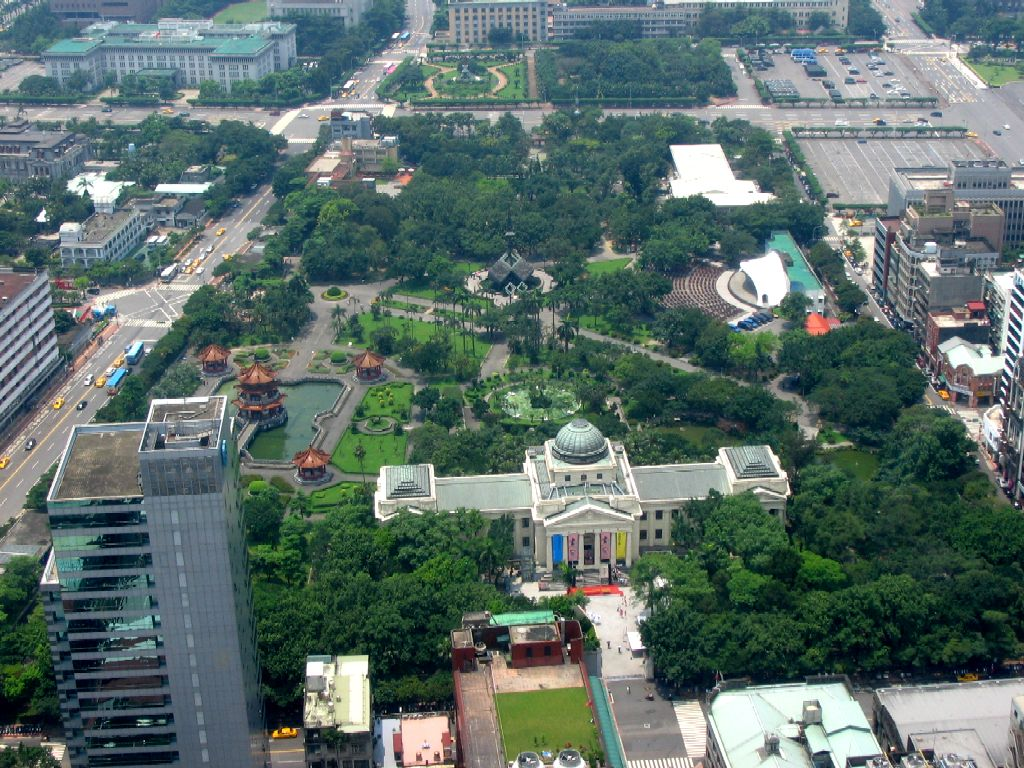
- Interactive map of 228 Peace Memorial Park
- Type: Municipal
- Location: Zhongzheng, Taipei, Taiwan
- Area: 71,520 m^{2} (769,800 sq ft)
- Created: 1900
- Open: All year

228 Peace Memorial Park
- Traditional Chinese: 二二八和平紀念公園
- Simplified Chinese: 二二八和平纪念公园
Transcriptions
Standard Mandarin
- Hanyu Pinyin: Èrèrbā Hépíng Jìniàn Gōngyuán
- Gwoyeu Romatzyh: Ellellba Herpyng Jihniann Gongyuan
Southern Min
- Hokkien POJ: Jī-jī-pat Hô-pêng Kì-liām Kong-hn̂g

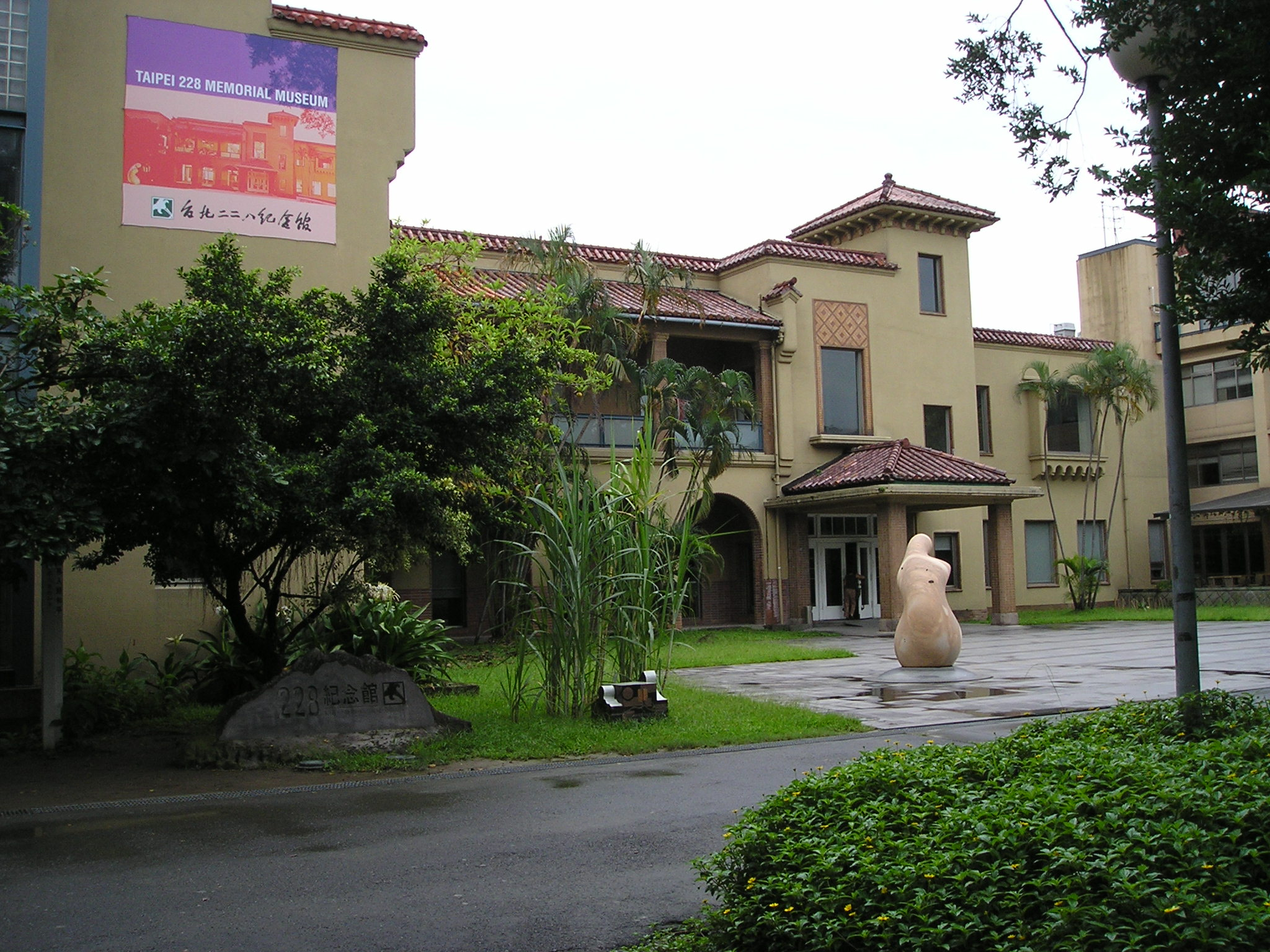
Taipei 228 Memorial Museum

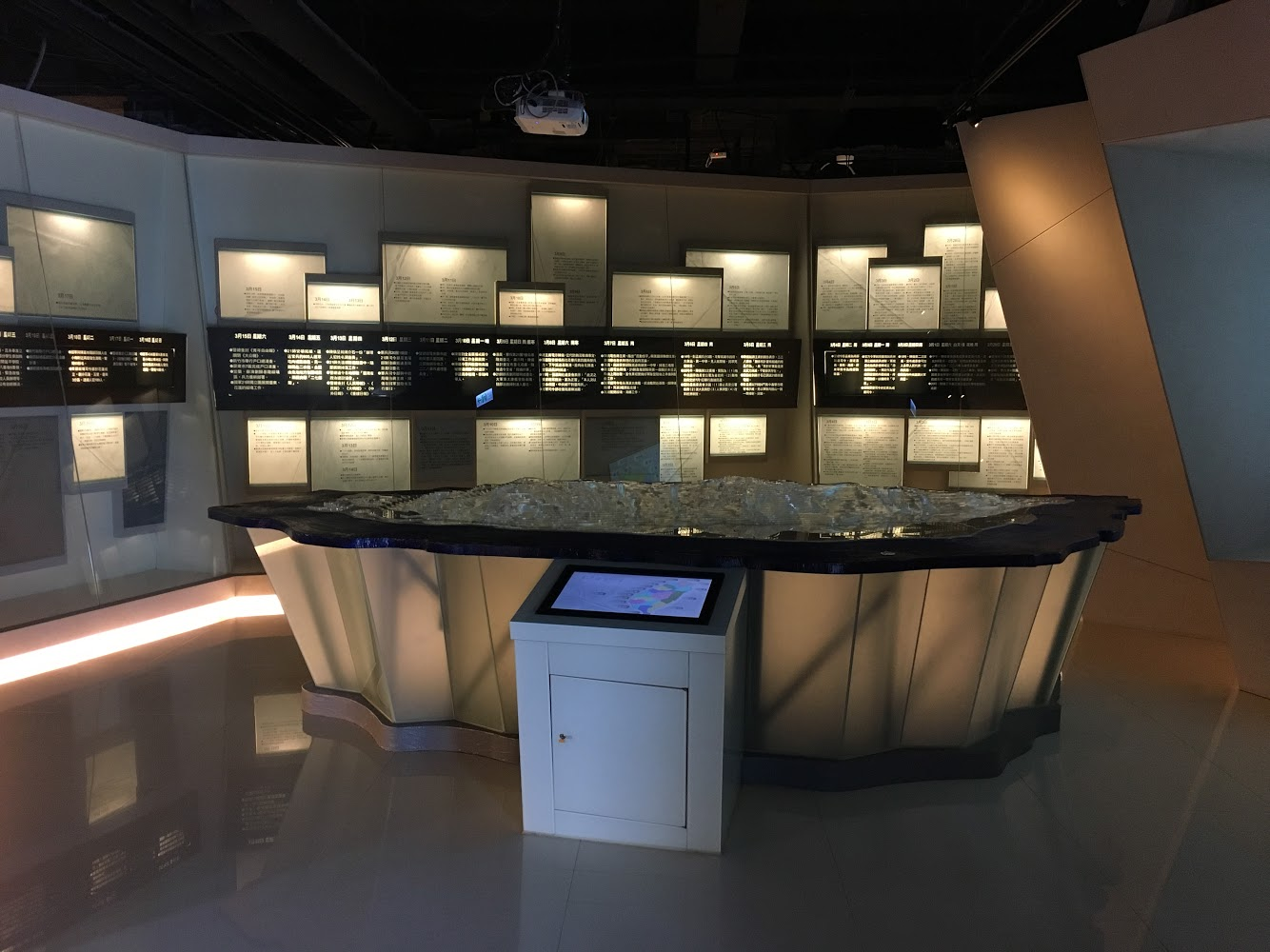
Interior of the Taipei 228 Memorial Museum

The 228 Peace Memorial Park (Chinese: 二二八和平紀念公園; Pe̍h-ōe-jī: Jī-jī-pat Hô-pêng Kì-liām Kong-hn̂g) is a historic site and municipal park located at 3 Ketagalan Boulevard, Zhongzheng District, Taipei, Taiwan. The park contains memorials to victims of the February 28 Incident of 1947, including the 228 Memorial Monument that stands at the center of the park and the Taipei 228 Memorial Museum, housed at the site of a former radio station that operated under Japanese and Kuomintang rule. The National Taiwan Museum stands at the park's north entrance. The park also has a bandshell and exercise areas.

== History ==
The park was originally established in 1900 as Taihoku New Park (臺北新公園; Pe̍h-ōe-jī: Tâi-oân Sin-kong-hn̂g) during the Japanese colonial period, on former temple grounds. It was the first European-style urban park in Taiwan, placed on the grounds of the Governor-General's Office.

In 1930, Taiwan's Japanese authorities established a radio station at the site designed by Kuriyama Shunichi (栗山俊一). The station initially housed the Taihoku Broadcasting Bureau, an arm of the Government-General Propaganda Bureau's Information Office. The following year, the Taiwan Broadcast Association was formed to handle island-wide broadcasts. The Taihoku Park radio station became the center of broadcast activity for the Association.

In 1935, it was one of the sites used for The Taiwan Exposition: In Commemoration of the First Forty Years of Colonial Rule.

After the handover of Taiwan from Japan to the Republic of China in 1945, the park was subsequently renamed Taipei New Park by the government. They renamed the broadcasting agency the Taiwan Broadcasting Company. The station became the primary broadcast organ of the Kuomintang government and military.

In 1947, a group of protesters, angry over a brutal police action against Taiwanese civilians, took over the station and used it to broadcast accusations against the Kuomintang government. The action formed part of a chain of events now referred to as the February 28 Incident. A subsequent, more severe crackdown by the Nationalist government restored the station to Kuomintang control and ushered in Taiwan's period of white terror. Two years later, the Kuomintang lost ground in the Chinese Civil War and its leaders retreated to Taiwan. Trying to establish themselves as China's true national government in exile, they renamed the bureau the Broadcasting Corporation of China (BCC).

The Taipei City government took over operation of the radio station building when the BCC moved in 1972. City officials made it the site of the Taipei City Government Parks and Street Lights Office.

As Taiwan entered its modern democracy period in the 1990s, President Lee Teng-hui offered an official apology in 1995 and invited free discussion of Taiwan's past. For the first time the February 28 Incident of 1947 was officially acknowledged and its significance openly debated. In 1996, the Taipei City Government designated the former radio station building a historical site. Two years later, the building was made the home of the Taipei 228 Memorial Museum and the park was rededicated as 228 Peace Memorial Park.

The 228 Memorial Monument was designed by Taiwanese architect Cheng Tzu-tsai, who was convicted of attempted murder in 1971 following a 1970 assassination attempt on Chiang Ching-kuo. After serving his sentence, he was imprisoned for illegal entry to Taiwan in 1991 and filed his design entry from prison. The Monument is inscribed with an exhortation for peace and unity.

Mistrust between Taiwanese and Mainlanders, and the argument on whether Taiwan should declare independence or be united with China, have become hot issues with potentially worrisome implications. [...] the task of healing a serious trauma in a society must depend on the whole-hearted collaborative effort by all its people. [...] It is also hoped that these words will serve as a warning and a lesson to all Taiwanese compatriots. Henceforward, we must be one, no matter which communal group we belong; we must help each other with compassion and treat each other with sincerity; we must dissolve hatred and resentment, and bring about long lasting peace. May Heaven bless Taiwan and keep it evergreen.

— Trustees of the 228 Memorial Foundation, Translation of the Inscription on the 228 Massacre Monument

On 25 November 2019, the museum was declared as a cultural asset by the Bureau of Cultural Heritage.

== Cultural references ==
The park is the primary setting for Pai Hsien-yung's novel Crystal Boys, which describes its reputation as a location for gay cruising in the 1970s.

== Access ==
The nearest Taipei Metro station is National Taiwan University Hospital Station.

== See also ==
- List of parks in Taiwan
