= 2009 World Games =

Multi-sport event in Kaohsiung, Taiwan

World Games VIII 第八屆世界運動會
- Motto Top Sports – High Spirits
- Host city: Kaohsiung, Taiwan under the IWGA Designation: Chinese Taipei
- Motto: Top Sports – High Spirits
- Nations: 84
- Athletes: 2908 (official number)
- Events: 146 (in 26 sports)
- Opening: 16 July 2009
- Closing: 26 July 2009
- Opened by: President Ma Ying-jeou
- Main venue: Kaohsiung National Stadium
- Website: theworldgames.org

The 2009 World Games (2009年世界運動會), also known as Kaohsiung 2009, the eighth edition of the World Games, were an international multi-sport event held in Kaohsiung, Taiwan (under the name Chinese Taipei) from 16 July 2009 to 26 July 2009. The games featured sports that are not contested in the Olympic Games.

2908 athletes and over 4400 volunteers and others from over 100 countries participated in the 2009 Kaohsiung World Games, setting a record high for the multi-sport competition. The International World Games Association (IWGA) President Ron Froehlich praised the July 16–26 games as the "best games ever."

== Emblem ==
The design of the emblem for The World Games 2009 is based on the first Chinese character in the city's name. The character "gāo" (高) means high or superior in English. The toponym stylized as a multicolored ribbon aims to create an atmosphere of festivity and celebration. The warm colors, orange and magenta, at the top and green and blue at the bottom symbolize the sun rising over the ocean and mirror Kaohsiung well: a passionate city with plenty of sunshine – a vibrant metropolis by the sea.

== Mascots ==

Gao Mei (高妹) and Syong Ge (雄哥) are named after the host city, Kaohsiung (according to Tongyong Pinyin). They are intended to personify it as "a city of the sea and the sun", to emphasize "ecology and environmental protection", and to symbolize the "friendliness and hospitality" of the city's residents.

== Opening ceremony ==
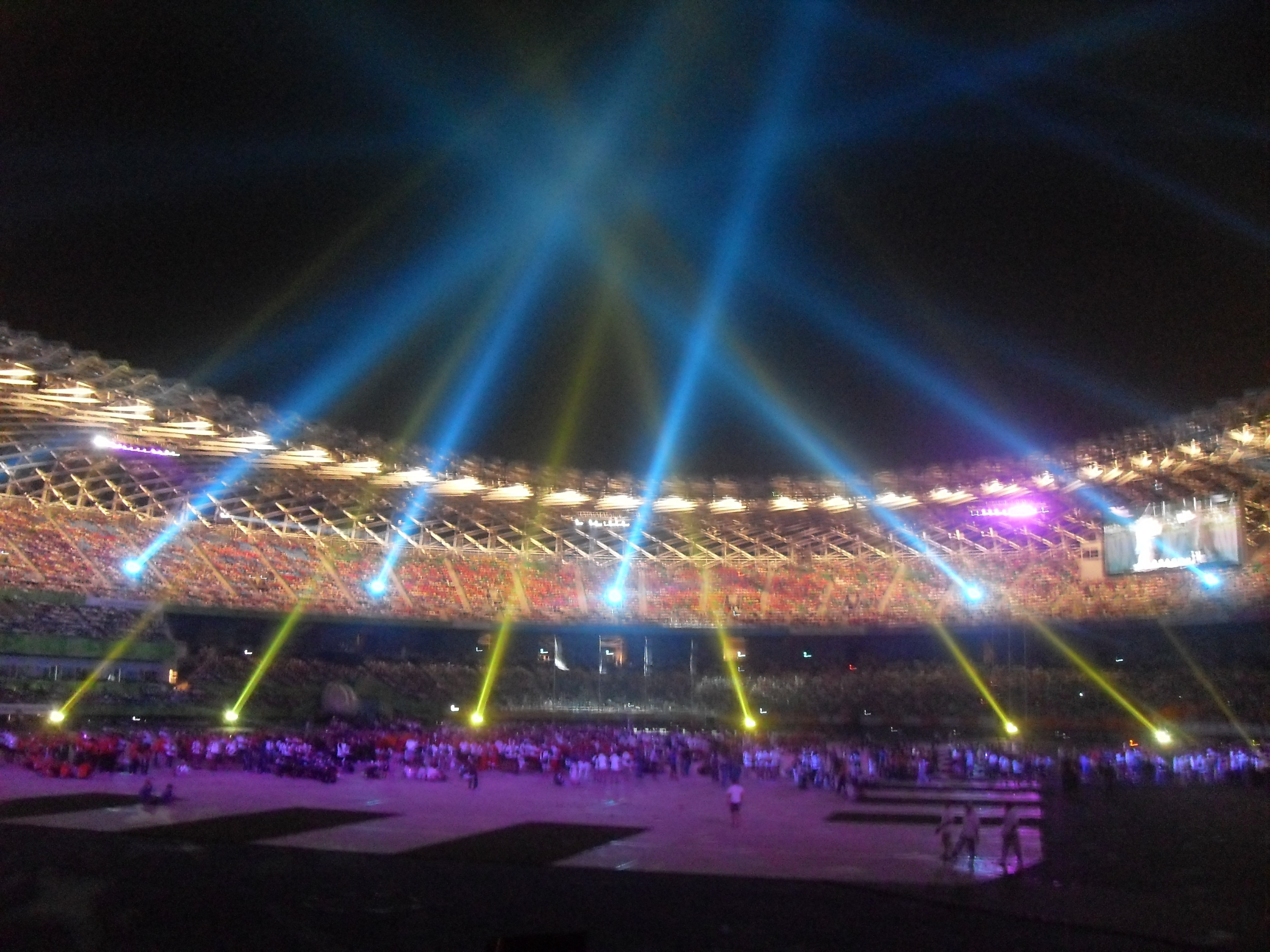
World Games 2009 opening ceremony.

The opening ceremony, on July 16, was held in the Main Stadium, and involved 4,000 performers. It was designed to provide "a platform for the world to understand Taiwan better", and focused on music, dancing and depictions of Taiwanese culture, including its aboriginal culture. The ceremony was watched by an estimated 100 million people worldwide.

Among the foreign dignitaries in attendance was the President of Nauru, Marcus Stephen, one of Taiwan's diplomatic allies and himself a former athlete, having won seven gold medals in weightlifting at the Commonwealth Games.

Although China had sent athletes to compete, they were absent from the opening ceremony, reportedly due to Ma Ying-jeou inaugurating the Games in his capacity as the head of state.

== News Conference ==
Kaohsiung Mayor Chen Chu said the city has shown "soft" power in staging The World Games that concluded and praised Kaohsiung residents for their passion in participating in the event. The mayor spoke at a news conference held after the closing ceremony during which International World Games Association (IWGA) President Ron Froehlich praised the July 16–26 games as the "best games ever."

Chen noted that after the city was awarded the right to host the Games in 2005, it was determined to make it a success, and she said the city showed "confidence and competence" in staging the first international sports event held in Taiwan after "numerous daunting coordination challenges." She also praised the maturity of Kaohsiung residents, saying that their enthusiastic participation and passionate cheering for athletes from every country was "touching." Revenues from ticket sales at The World Games have been initially estimated at NT$65 million. Chen noted Froehlich's praise of Kaohsiung, which she said has displayed friendship, cooperation and community participation, and offered her best wishes to Cali, Colombia, which will host the next World Games in 2013.

She said Kaohsiung is an open, rich and pluralistic city that respects human rights and tolerates different views and political stances as long as they are expressed in a peaceful manners. Concerning the absence of the athletes from China, which was reported to be a boycott, from the opening and closing ceremonies of The World Games, she said that as a big country, she expected it to show more grace and tolerance.

== Participants ==
- Angola (1)
- Argentina (28)
- Armenia (1)
- Australia (168)
- Austria (51)
- Azerbaijan (11)
- Bahamas (1)
- Belarus (25)
- Belgium (73)
- Bolivia (6)
- Bosnia and Herzegovina (5)
- Brazil (77)
- British Virgin Islands (2)
- Bulgaria (23)
- Canada (141)
- Chile (27)
- China (148)
- Colombia (30)
- Costa Rica (3)
- Croatia (45)
- Cuba (2)
- Cyprus (1)
- Czech Republic (51)
- Denmark (25)
- Dominican Republic (8)
- Ecuador (10)
- Egypt (46)
- El Salvador (4)
- Estonia (16)
- Fiji (16)
- Finland (32)
- France (220)
- Georgia (1)
- Germany (230)
- Greece (15)
- Guatemala (7)
- Hong Kong (51)
- Hungary (92)
- India (10)
- Indonesia (12)
- Iran (11)
- Iraq (1)
- Ireland (17)
- Israel (14)
- Italy (189)
- Japan (282)
- Kazakhstan (19)
- Kenya (1)
- South Korea (79)
- Kuwait (6)
- Latvia (21)
- Lithuania (11)
- Luxembourg (1)
- Macau (10)
- Macedonia (15)
- Madagascar (3)
- Malaysia (29)
- Mexico (15)
- Moldova (2)
- Mongolia (8)
- Montenegro (8)
- Myanmar (2)
- Nepal (1)
- Netherlands (112)
- Netherlands Antilles (1)
- New Zealand (62)
- Norway (35)
- Oman (13)
- Pakistan (16)
- Peru (5)
- Philippines (16)
- Poland (24)
- Portugal (68)
- Puerto Rico (3)
- Qatar (2)
- Romania (13)
- Russia (225)
- Senegal (2)
- Serbia (4)
- Singapore (64)
- Slovakia (25)
- Slovenia (24)
- South Africa (86)
- Spain (52)
- Sri Lanka (1)
- Sweden (87)
- Switzerland (115)
- Chinese Taipei (459) – Host
- Tanzania (1)
- Thailand (52)
- Tunisia (6)
- Turkey (22)
- Ukraine (155)
- United Arab Emirates (3)
- United Kingdom (204)
- United States (211)
- United States Virgin Islands (1)
- Uruguay (3)
- Uzbekistan (7)
- Venezuela (36)
- Vietnam (23)

== Sports ==
=== Official sports ===
The 2009 World Games programme featured 31 official sports, and 5 invitational sports. The numbers in parentheses indicate the number of medal events, which were contested in each sports discipline.

- Acrobatic gymnastics (5)
- Aerobic gymnastics (5)
- Air sports (5)
- Artistic roller skating (4)
- Bodybuilding (7)
- Boules sports (8)
- Bowling (3)
- Canoe polo (2)
- Cue sports (4)
- Dancesport (3)
- Field archery (6)
- Finswimming (10)
- Fistball (1)
- Flying disc (1)
- Inline hockey (1)
- Inline speed skating (10)
- Ju-jitsu (10)
- Karate (13)
- Korfball (1)
- Lifesaving (16)
- Orienteering (5)
- Powerlifting (8)
- Racquetball (2)
- Rhythmic gymnastics (4)
- Rugby sevens (1)
- Sport climbing (4)
- Squash (2)
- Sumo (8)
- Trampoline gymnastics (6)
- Tug of war (3)
- Water skiing (6)

=== Invitational sports ===
- Beach handball (2)
- Dragon boat (4)
- Softball (1)
- Tchoukball (2)
- Wushu (13)

== Doping ==
On 16 September 2009, the IWGA announced that there had been several doping violations at the recently completed 2009 Games. On 26 October 2009, the IWGA Anti-Doping Panel decided on punitive measures against five medal-winners (four bodybuilders and a sumo athlete). The measures included the stripping of three gold and two silver medals, as well as lifetime bans from The World Games for three bodybuilders. The IWGA has made no announcement of reallocation of the forfeited bodybuilding medals. The International Sumo Federation reallocated the medals for the affected sumo event. In 2010, all medals in the sport of bodybuilding were removed from the medal table at the host organizer's website (worldgames2009.tw, "The World Games 2009 Kaohsiung"), which is now archived. However, all medals as first bestowed still appear at The World Games website (theworldgames.org) in both look-up and full result reports. The sport of bodybuilding has not appeared at a subsequent edition of The World Games.

== Medal table ==
=== Official sports ===
The medal tally during the eighth World Games is as follows. Russia finished at the top of the final medal table. Excluded are four bodybuilding medals forfeited for doping and not reallocated. In two events there were two bronze medals awarded because of ties for third-place: women's 100m finswimming and women's life saving combined relay.

* Host nation (Chinese Taipei)

Rank	Nation	Gold	Silver	Bronze	Total
1	Russia (RUS)	19	13	15	47
2	Italy (ITA)	16	12	13	41
3	China (CHN)	14	10	5	29
4	United States (USA)	13	8	5	26
5	France (FRA)	11	14	13	38
6	Ukraine (UKR) (Note: In 2009, Ukraine was stripped of two gold medals in bodybuilding for doping, and Qatar and Brazil were each stripped of a silver medal. This table does not include those stripped medals, and neither does it include possible reallocation of those medals, as the results at the World Games website do not reflect a reallocation.)	9	12	10	31
7	Chinese Taipei (TPE)*	8	9	7	24
8	Germany (GER)	6	6	10	22
9	South Korea (KOR)	6	3	5	14
10	Australia (AUS)	5	10	5	20
11	Great Britain (GBR)	4	6	9	19
12	Japan (JPN)	4	5	6	15
13	Colombia (COL)	4	5	3	12
14	Netherlands (NED)	4	5	2	11
15	Switzerland (SUI)	3	4	0	7
16	Brazil (BRA)	3	2	3	8
17	New Zealand (NZL)	2	4	5	11
18	Belgium (BEL)	2	4	1	7
19	Slovakia (SVK)	2	3	3	8
20	Finland (FIN)	2	3	1	6
21	Spain (ESP)	2	3	0	5
22	Slovenia (SLO)	2	2	0	4
23	Austria (AUT)	2	1	2	5
24	Croatia (CRO)	2	0	3	5
25	Mongolia (MGL)	1	3	0	4
26	Canada (CAN)	1	1	2	4
26	Poland (POL)	1	1	2	4
28	Greece (GRE)	1	1	1	3
29	Romania (ROU)	1	1	0	2
30	Malaysia (MAS)	1	0	3	4
31	Thailand (THA)	1	0	2	3
31	Venezuela (VEN)	1	0	2	3
33	Bosnia and Herzegovina (BIH)	1	0	1	2
33	Chile (CHI)	1	0	1	2
33	Hungary (HUN) (Note: Hungary was stripped of a gold medal in sumo for doping. This table reflects the reallocation of medals specified by the International Sumo Federation.)	1	0	1	2
33	Indonesia (INA)	1	0	1	2
33	Kazakhstan (KAZ)	1	0	1	2
38	Estonia (EST)	1	0	0	1
38	Fiji (FIJ)	1	0	0	1
38	Mexico (MEX)	1	0	0	1
38	Vietnam (VIE)	1	0	0	1
42	Portugal (POR)	0	2	0	2
43	Egypt (EGY)	0	1	4	5
44	Norway (NOR)	0	1	2	3
44	South Africa (RSA)	0	1	2	3
46	Azerbaijan (AZE)	0	1	1	2
46	Sweden (SWE)	0	1	1	2
48	Argentina (ARG)	0	1	0	1
48	Denmark (DEN)	0	1	0	1
48	Dominican Republic (DOM)	0	1	0	1
48	Hong Kong (HKG)	0	1	0	1
48	Lithuania (LTU)	0	1	0	1
53	Turkey (TUR)	0	0	3	3
54	Montenegro (MNE)	0	0	2	2
55	Belarus (BLR)	0	0	1	1
55	Bulgaria (BUL)	0	0	1	1
55	Czech Republic (CZE)	0	0	1	1
55	Israel (ISR)	0	0	1	1
55	Luxembourg (LUX)	0	0	1	1
55	Philippines (PHI)	0	0	1	1
55	United Arab Emirates (UAE)	0	0	1	1
Totals (61 entries)		162	163	165	490

=== Invitational sports ===
* Host nation (Chinese Taipei)

Rank	Nation	Gold	Silver	Bronze	Total
1	China (CHN)	8	0	0	8
2	Russia (RUS)	6	2	1	9
3	Chinese Taipei (TPE)*	3	5	2	10
4	Iran (IRI)	2	1	1	4
5	Japan (JPN)	1	2	1	4
6	Brazil (BRA)	1	0	1	2
7	Italy (ITA)	1	0	0	1
8	Hungary (HUN)	0	3	1	4
9	Vietnam (VIE)	0	2	2	4
10	Hong Kong (HKG)	0	2	1	3
11	Switzerland (SUI)	0	2	0	2
12	Croatia (CRO)	0	1	1	2
12	Germany (GER)	0	1	1	2
14	Philippines (PHI)	0	1	0	1
15	Canada (CAN)	0	0	2	2
15	Malaysia (MAS)	0	0	2	2
15	South Korea (KOR)	0	0	2	2
18	Indonesia (INA)	0	0	1	1
18	Singapore (SIN)	0	0	1	1
Totals (19 entries)		22	22	20	64

== Calendar ==
In the following calendar for The World Games 2009, each blue box represents an event competition, such as a qualification round, on that day. The yellow boxes represent days during which medal-awarding finals for a sport were held. Each bullet in these boxes is an event final, the number of bullets per box representing the number of finals that were contested on that day. On the left the calendar lists each sport with events held during the Games, and at the right how many gold medals were won in that sport. There is a key at the top of the calendar to aid the reader.

As Invitational sport

●	Opening ceremony	Event competitions	●	Event finals	●	Closing ceremony

July 2009	16 Thu	17 Fri	18 Sat	19 Sun	20 Mon	21 Tue	22 Wed	23 Thu	24 Fri	25 Sat	26 Sun	Gold medals
Ceremonies	●										●	—
Air sports parachuting						●●●●●						5
Field archery											●●●● ●●	6
Beach handball					●●							2
Billiards											●●●●	4
Bodybuilding				●●●● ●●●								7
Boules sports Lyonnaise							●●●●					4
Boules sports Petangue							●●					2
Boules sports Raffa							●●					2
Bowling ten pin					●		●●					3
Canoe polo			●●									2
Dance sport									●	●●		3
Dragon boat		●●	●●									4
Fin swimming								●●●● ●	●●●● ●			10
Fistball					●							1
Flying disc						●						1
Acrobatic gymnastics					●●	●●	●					5
Aerobic gymnastics									●●	●●●		5
Rhythmic gymnastics		●●	●●									4
Trampoline gymnastics					●	●●	●●●					6
Ju-Jitsu						●●●● ●	●●●● ●					10
Karate										●●●● ●●	●●●● ●●●	13
Korfball						●						1
Life saving								●●●●	●●●●	●●●● ●●		14
Orienteering		●●	●●	●								5
Powerlifting										●●●● ●	●●●	8
Racquetball								●●				2
Roller sports–Artistic							●●●●					4
Roller sports–Inline Hockey											●	1
Roller Sports–Speed		●●●●	●●●●	●●								10
Rugby sevens										●		1
Softball					●							1
Sport climbing			●●	●●								4
Squash									●●			2
Sumo		●●●● ●●	●●									8
Tchoukball											●●	2
Tug of War Indoor				●								1
Tug of War Outdoor			●	●								2
Water skiing									●●	●●●●		6
Wushu								●●	●●●● ●●●● ●●●			13
July 2009	16 Thu	17 Fri	18 Sat	19 Sun	20 Mon	21 Tue	22 Wed	23 Thu	24 Fri	25 Sat	26 Sun	Gold medals

== Venues ==
Venue	Sports
Chengcing Lake	Archery, Orienteering
Chung Cheng Martial Arts Stadium	Billiards, Racquetball, Squash
Chungcheng Stadium	Fistball
Cultural Center Jhihde Hall	Bodybuilding, Aerobic gymnastics
Gymnasium of the National Sun Yat-sen University	Ju-jitsu, Karate
Gymnasium of the Guo-Guang Laboratory School, National Sun Yat-sen University	Tug of war
Gymnasium of the Kaohsiung Municipal Kaohsiung Senior High School	Sumo
Gymnasium of the National Kaohsiung Normal University	Korfball, Tchoukball
Happy Bowling Center	Bowling
I-Shou University	Roller sports
Ren-ai Park	Boules
Kaohsiung Arena	Acrobatic gymnastics, DanceSport, Rhythmic gymnastics, Trampoline, Tumbling
Kaohsiung Li De Baseball Stadium	Softball
Kaohsiung County Stadium	Wushu
Kaohsiung Metropolitan Park	Parachuting
Kaohsiung Museum of Fine Arts	Orienteering
Kaohsiung Swimming Pool	Finswimming, Lifesaving
Lotus Lake	Canoe polo, Water skiing, Dragon Boat race
Shou-shan Junior High School	Climbing
Sizihwan Bay	Lifesaving, Beach handball
Sun Yat-sen Hall of the National Sun Yat-sen University	Powerlifting
World Games Stadium	Flying disc, Rugby sevens
Yangming Skating Rink	Roller sports

== See also ==
- List of sporting events in Taiwan
