= Chinese Taipei at the 2009 World Games =

- IOC code: TPE
- NOC: Chinese Taipei Olympic Committee

in Kaohsiung, Taiwan 16 July 2009 – 26 July 2009
- Competitors: 459 in 28 sports
- Medals Ranked 7th: Gold 9 Silver 8 Bronze 9 Total 26

World Games appearances
- 1981; 1985; 1989; 1993; 1997; 2001; 2005; 2009; 2013; 2017; 2022; 2025

Taiwan competed under the designated name "Chinese Taipei" at the 2009 World Games held in Kaohsiung, Taiwan from 16 to 26 July 2009."Chinese Taipei" is the designated name used by Taiwan to participate in some international organizations and almost all sporting events. As the host nation, it was the largest team in this event. Athletes representing Taiwan won nine gold medals, eight silver medals and nine bronze medals. The country finished in 7th place in the medal table.

== Medalists ==
| Medal | Name | Sport | Event | Date |
|---|---|---|---|---|
| Gold | Wang Chia-chi; Ko Chia-wen; Lee Tzu-yi; Chen Li-hui; Yang Shih-yu; Cheng Shu-fang; Wang Tzu-jung; Kanlin Yi-ching; Hsu Yu-ling | Tug of war | Women's Indoor 520 kg | 19 July |
| Gold | Lo Wei-lin | Inline speed skating | Men's 300 m time trial | 17 July |
| Gold | Huang Yu-ting | Inline speed skating | Women's 300 m time trial | 17 July |
| Gold | Huang Yu-ting | Inline speed skating | Women's 500 m sprint | 19 July |
| Gold | Huang Yu-ting | Inline speed skating | Women's 1000 m sprint | 18 July |
| Gold | Hsieh Tsung-ting | Powerlifting | Men's Lightweight | 25 July |
| Gold | Chen Wei-ling | Powerlifting | Women's Lightweight | 25 July |
| Gold | Huang Hao-yun | Karate | Men's equipped super heavyweight | 25 July |
| Silver | Lo Wei-lin | Inline speed skating | Men's 500 m sprint | 17 July |
| Silver | Hsu Chiao-jen | Inline speed skating | Women's 300 m time trial | 17 July |
| Silver | Hsu Chiao-jen | Inline speed skating | Women's 1000 m sprint | 18 July |
| Silver | Li Ching-yi | Ju-jitsu | Women's 55 kg | 17 July |
| Silver | Yang Hsien-tzu | Ju-jitsu | Women's 62 kg | 17 July |
| Silver | Yang Ching-shun | Cue sports | Men's 9-ball | 14 July |
| Silver | Hsia Wen-haung | Karate | Men's kumite 60kg | 14 July |
| Silver | Chen Yen-hui | Karate | Women's kumite 53kg | 14 July |
| Bronze | Pan Yi-chen | Inline speed skating | Women's 15000 m elimination | 19 July |
| Bronze | Yang Chin-kuei | Inline speed skating | Women's 200 m obstacle swim | 19 July |
| Bronze | Lin Yuan-chun | Cue sports | Women's 9-ball | 14 July |
| Bronze | Huang Chien-chih | Bodybuilding | Men's 75kg | 14 July |
| Bronze | Chang Ting | Karate | Women's kumite 60kg | 14 July |
| Bronze | Wu Wei Ting; Lin Sheng-ru; Chuang Ying-chieh; Chen Tzu-hsien; Chen Ie-en; Chou Chih-wei; Iya Lahok; Chien Cheng Yen; Lee Chun-lin; Yin Wan-ting | Korfball | Mixed team | 10 July |
| Bronze | Chang Ya-wen | Powerlifting | Women's Super heavyweight | 12 July |
