= List of 2005 World Games medal winners =

The 2005 World Games were held in Duisburg, Germany, from July 14 to July 24, 2005.

== Acrobatic gymnastics ==
Event	Gold	Silver	Bronze
Men's pair	Russia; Ervin Mednikov; Alexey Moshechkin	Ukraine; Mykola Shcherbak; Serhiy Popov	Great Britain; Mark Fyson; Chris Jones
Men's group	Ukraine; Vladyslav Glushchenko; Oleksandr Bondarenko; Andriy Bondarenko; Andriy Perunov	Great Britain; Barrie Hindson; Scott Patterson; Stuart McKenzie; David Scott	Russia; Sergey Shetinin; Igor Zarudny; Alexander Chemodanov; Artem Trifonov
Women's pair	Russia; Yanna Cholaeva; Anna Melnikova	Great Britain; Yvonne Welsh; Julie Cameron	Portugal; Cátia Messias; Inês Valada
Women's group	Russia; Tatiana Alexeeva; Elena Moiseeva; Elena Kirilova	Belarus; Halina Starevich; Maria Girut; Tatsiana Motuz	Kazakhstan; Gaukhar Akhmetova; Alexandra Yenina; Aigul Dukenbayeva
Mixed pair	Russia; Revaz Gurgenidze; Anna Kachalova	Belgium; Yves Vander Donckt; Tiffany Cuyt	Ukraine; Serhiy Pelepets; Maryna Chevchuk

== Aerobic gymnastics ==
Event	Gold	Silver	Bronze
Men's individual	Vito Iaia; Italy	Adrien Galo; France	Sergey Konstantinov; Russia
Women's individual	Elmira Dassaeva; Spain	Giovanna Lecis; Italy	Izabela Lăcătuș; Romania
Mixed pair	Spain; Jonatan Cañada; Alba de las Heras	Romania; Remus Nicolai; Izabela Lăcătuș	Italy; Wilkie Satti; Giovanna Lecis
Trio	Romania; Raluca Băbăligea; Mădălina Cioveie; Cristina Nedelcu	France; Grégory Alcan; Christelle Alcan; Xavier Julien	Russia; Lyubov Bogdanova; Danila Shokhin; Pavel Grishin
Group	China; Ao Jinping; He Shijian; Qin Yong; Xiong Deliang; Yan Song; Yu Wei	Romania; Mihaela Pohoață; Cristina Marin; Raluca Băbăligea; Cristina Antonescu; Mădălina Cioveie; Cristina Nedelcu	France; Xavier Julien; Julien Chaninet; Adrien Galo; Harold Lorenzi; Gaylord Oubrier; Vivien Peralta

== Artistic roller skating ==
Event	Gold	Silver	Bronze
Men's free skating	François Cattoire; France	Albert Trilla; Spain	Neil Emms; Great Britain
Women's free skating	Laura Sánchez; Spain	Lucija Mlinarič; Slovenia	Diana Ribeiro; Portugal
Pairs	Italy; Federico Degli Esposti; Marika Zanforlin	Germany; Patrick Friede; Tanja Baensch	United States; Robert Hines; Audrey Orcutt
Dance	Italy; Marco Bornati; Monica Coffele	Italy; Gabriele Gasparini; Enrica Gasparini	United States; Logan Boggs; Julie Locke

== Bodybuilding ==
Event	Gold	Silver	Bronze
Men's 70 kg	José Carlos Santos; Brazil	Kamil Majek; Poland	Anwar El-Amawy; Egypt
Men's 75 kg	Werner Zenk; Germany	Igor Kočiš; Slovakia	Corrado Maggiore; Italy
Men's 80 kg	Juraj Vrábel; Slovakia	Andreas Becker; Germany	Luiz Carlos Sarmento; Brazil
Men's 85 kg	Kamal El-Gargni; Qatar	Tareq Al-Farsani; Bahrain	Frank Schramm; Germany
Men's +85 kg	El-Shahat Mabrouk; Egypt	Ali Tabrizi; Qatar	Thomas Scheu; Germany
Women's 52 kg	Iryna Petrenko; Ukraine	Lo Kit Ming; Hong Kong	Cao Xinli; China
Women's +52 kg	Agnieszka Ryk; Poland	Aurélia Grožajová; Slovakia	Simone Linay; Germany

== Boules sports ==
Event	Gold	Silver	Bronze
Men's lyonnaise precision	Markica Dodig; Bosnia and Herzegovina	Sandro Gulja; Croatia	Frédéric Ascensi; France
Men's lyonnaise progressive	Mauro Bunino; Italy	Fabien Jarnet; France	Jasmin Čaušević; Slovenia
Men's pétanque triples	France; Simon Cortès; Sylvain Dubreuil; Sylvain Pilewski	Madagascar; Sylvain Rakotoarivelo; Michel Rakotomalala; Jean Randrianandrasana	Belgium; André Lozano; Michel Van Campenhout; Claudy Weibel
Women's lyonnaise precision	Fatiha Targhaoui; Morocco	Corine Maugiron; France	Tanja Gobo; Croatia
Women's lyonnaise progressive	Ilenia Pasin; Italy	Wang Mei; China	Magali Billeaud; France
Women's pétanque triples	France; Ingrid D'Introno; Cynthia Quennehen; Chantal Solaris	Thailand; Thongsri Thamakord; Phantipha Wongchuvej; Noknoi Youngcham	Germany; Gudrun Deterding; Lara Eble; Daniela Thelen

== Bowling ==
Event	Gold	Silver	Bronze
Men's nine-pin singles	Steve Blasen; Luxembourg	Guus Maes; Netherlands	Bernardo Ramalho; Brazil
Men's ten-pin singles	Kai Virtanen; Finland	Gery Verbruggen; Belgium	Andrew Cain; United States
Women's nine-pin singles	Elgin Justen; Germany	Petra Comoth; Belgium	Marceline Della Modesta; Luxembourg
Women's ten-pin singles	Kim Soo-kyung; South Korea	Zara Glover; Great Britain	Caroline Lagrange; Canada
Mixed nine-pin doubles	Germany; Holger Mayer; Elgin Justen	Luxembourg; Steve Blasen; Marceline Della Modesta	Netherlands; Guus Maes; Marjon Berends
Mixed ten-pin doubles	France; François Sacco; Isabelle Saldjian	Malaysia; Zulmazran Zulkifli; Shalin Zulkifli	South Korea; Kang Hee-won; Kim Soo-kyung

== Canoe polo ==
Event	Gold	Silver	Bronze
Men	Netherlands; Robert Aitken; Jeroen Dieperink; Jurjen Hallegraeff; Hagen Oligmüller; Wouter Ottjes; Erwin Roos; Michiel Schreurs; Bart Verkissen	Germany; Kai Berner; Matthias Berner; Tim Flohr; Robin Pechuel-Loesche; Richard Radloff; Niklas Reimers; Björn Zirotzki	Great Britain; Nick Archer; Danny Bowles; Neil Edmunds; Paul Hammond; Peter Meakin; Stuart Moffit; Alan Vessey; Martyn Williamson
Women	Germany; Ina Bauer; Diane Kempin; Katja Kraus; Tonie Lenz; Margret Neher; Cornelia Sommer-Niehus; Lena Weinberger; Regina Weinberger	Great Britain; Zoe Anthony; Ginny Coyles; Sharon Derrick; Lianne Grayson; Pip Grayson; Kathryn Grieves; Kirsty Sutcliffe	Japan; Yoko Itoda; Yuki Itoda; Naomi Kabaya; Ritsuko Kitagawa; Maya Mori; Nagisa Otsuki; Aya Ueda; Megumi Watanabe

== Casting ==
Event	Gold	Silver	Bronze
Men's fly accuracy	Patrik Lexa; Czech Republic	Iwana Inukai; Japan	Janusz Paprzycki; Poland
Men's fly distance single handed	Włodzimierz Targosz; Poland	Steve Rajeff; United States	Henry Mittel; Germany
Men's spinning accuracy arenberg target	Marko Popović; Croatia	Klaus-Jürgen Bruder; Germany	Jan Luxa; Czech Republic
Women's fly accuracy	Jana Maisel; Germany	Alena Zinner; Austria	Monika Talar; Poland
Women's fly distance single handed	Alena Zinner; Austria	Zuzana Kočířová; Czech Republic	Kathrin Ernst; Germany
Women's spinning accuracy arenberg target	Jana Maisel; Germany	Jana Brončková; Czech Republic	Zuzana Kočířová; Czech Republic

== Cue sports ==
Event	Gold	Silver	Bronze
Men's three-cushion carom	Dani Sánchez; Spain	Dick Jaspers; Netherlands	Semih Saygıner; Turkey
Men's nine-ball pool	Chang Pei-wei; Chinese Taipei	Thorsten Hohmann; Germany	Rodney Morris; United States
Men's snooker	Gerard Greene; Great Britain	Ding Junhui; China	Bjorn Haneveer; Belgium
Women's nine-ball pool	Jasmin Ouschan; Austria	Jennifer Chen; Chinese Taipei	Line Kjørsvik; Norway

== Dancesport ==
Event	Gold	Silver	Bronze
Standard	Lithuania; Arūnas Bižokas; Edita Daniūtė	Germany; Sascha Karabey; Natascha Karabey	Italy; Paolo Bosco; Silvia Pitton
Latin	United States; Eugene Katsevman; Maria Manusova	Denmark; Peter Stokkebroe; Kristina Juel Stokkebroe	Italy; Stefano Di Filippo; Annalisa Di Filippo
Rock 'n' Roll	France; Christophe Payan; Diane Eonin	Russia; Ivan Yudin; Olga Sbitneva	France; Alexis Chardenoux; Fanny Delebecque

== Field archery ==
Event	Gold	Silver	Bronze
Men's recurve	Michele Frangilli; Italy	Alan Wills; Great Britain	Alvise Bertolini; Italy
Men's compound	Morgan Lundin; Sweden	Dejan Sitar; Slovenia	Dave Cousins; United States
Men's barebow	Erik Jonsson; Sweden	Mario Orlandi; Italy	Mattias Larsson; Sweden
Women's recurve	Petra Ericsson; Sweden	Laure Barczynski; France	Laurence Pecqueux; France
Women's compound	Martina Schacht; Germany	Jamie Van Natta; United States	Petra Friedl; Austria
Women's barebow	Monika Jentges; Germany	Reingild Linhart; Austria	Luciana Pennacchi; Italy

== Finswimming ==
Event	Gold	Silver	Bronze
Men's 100 m surface	Andrey Burakov; Russia	Yuan Haifeng; China	Aleksandr Panyutin; Russia
Men's 200 m surface	Pavel Kabanov; Russia	Nikolay Reznikov; Russia	Viktor Panov; Ukraine
Men's 400 m surface	Nikolay Reznikov; Russia	Ioannis Tsourounakis; Greece	Lorenzo Minisola; Italy
Men's 50 m apnoea	Evgeny Skorzhenko; Russia	Nikolai Tover; Estonia	Igor Soroka; Ukraine
Men's 4 × 100 m surface relay	Russia; Andrey Burakov; Evgeny Skorzhenko; Aleksandr Panyutin; Pavel Kabanov	Ukraine; Dmytro Sydorenko; Viktor Panov; Dmitriy Artemchuk; Igor Soroka	Italy; Riccardo Galli; Lorenzo Minisola; Cesare Fumarola; Andrea Nava
Women's 100 m surface	Zhu Baozhen; China	Vasilisa Kravchuk; Russia	Liu Qi; China
Women's 200 m surface	Vasilisa Kravchuk; Russia	Valentina Artemyeva; Russia	Liu Qi; China
Women's 400 m surface	Chen Xiaoping; China	Ekaterina Politko; Russia	Carolin Stut; Germany
Women's 50 m apnoea	Anastassia Glukhikh; Russia	Zhu Baozhen; China	Galija Sattarova; Estonia
Women's 4 × 100 m surface relay	Russia; Valentina Artemyeva; Svetlana Dedyukh; Anastassia Glukhikh; Vasilisa Kravchuk	China; Zhu Baozhen; Zhong Jiexia; Chen Xiaoping; Liu Qi	South Korea; Bae So-hyun; Hong Hye-sun; Jeon Ah-ram; Kim Hyeon-jin

== Fistball ==
Event	Gold	Silver	Bronze
Men	Austria; Stefan Einsiedler; Markus Fels; Klemens Kronsteiner; Christian Leitner; Dietmar Weiß; Martin Weiß; Norbert Zauner; Christian Zöttl	Brazil; Jean Andrioli; Fernando Eisele; Fabian Fialla; Cristian Kohlmann; George Schuch; Gerson Süffert; Jorge Süffert; Paulo Süffert	Germany; Sascha Ball; Ole Hermanns; Jan Hoffrichter; Christian Kläner; Michael Krauß; Philip Meiners; Lutz Meyer; Niels Pannewig

== Flying disc ==
Event	Gold	Silver	Bronze
Mixed ultimate	United States; Deb Cussen; Will Deaver; Jeff Eastham; Dominique Fontenette; Kati Halmos; Mike Namkung; Miranda Roth; Chase Sparling-Beckley; Bart Watson; Jessi Witt; Josh Ziperstein	Australia; Anthony Dowle; Matthew Dowle; Liz Edye; Jonno Holmes; Jane Irving; Lisa McGinnigle; Jonathan Potts; Tom Rogacki; Owen Shepherd; Sarah Wentworth; Diana Worman	Canada; Derek Alexander; Anne-Marie Carey; Victoria Chow; Jeff Cruickshank; Valérie Dion; Erin Huck; Andrew Lugsdin; Oscar Pottinger; Kirk Savage; Su-Ning Strube; Evan Wood

== Inline hockey ==
Event	Gold	Silver	Bronze
Men	United States; J. P. Beilstein; Mike Ciolli; Dan Costanza; Oliver David; Travis Fudge; Rob Laurie; Ziggy Marszalek; Taj Melson; Greg Thompson; Ron Tracy; Ryan Viamontes; Eric Weichselbaumer; C. J. Yoder; Jami Yoder	Canada; Hugo Bélanger; Brendan Brooks; Jamie Cooke; Kirk French; Brian Goudie; Derek Hahn; Michael Hunt; Humphrey Scott; Chris Skoryna; Gerry St. Cyr; Kevin St. Pierre; Steve Wilson	Switzerland; Michael Diener; Carlo Fäh; Maik Geng; Walter Gerber; Remo Hirt; Marc Imhof; Pascal Lamprecht; Patrick Mäder; Mathias Müller; Patrick Rothen; Bernhard Ryser; Stephan Schild; Roland Stähli; Stefan Tschannen

== Inline speed skating ==
Event	Gold	Silver	Bronze
Men's 300 m time trial	Gregorio Duggento; Italy	Kalon Dobbin; New Zealand	Javier McCargo; Argentina
Men's 500 m sprint	Kalon Dobbin; New Zealand	Anderson Ariza; Colombia	Camilo Orozco; Colombia
Men's 1000 m sprint	Kalon Dobbin; New Zealand	Baptiste Grandgirard; France	José Guzmán; Chile
Men's 3000 m elimination	Thomas Boucher; France	Alexis Contin; France	Fabio Francolini; Italy
Men's 5000 m points elimination	Alexis Contin; France	Shane Dobbin; New Zealand	Matteo Amabili; Italy
Men's 10000 m elimination	Baptiste Grandgirard; France	Kalon Dobbin; New Zealand	Fabio Francolini; Italy
Women's 300 m time trial	Laura Orrù; Italy	Andrea González; Argentina	Jennifer Caicedo; Colombia
Women's 500 m sprint	Jennifer Caicedo; Colombia	Laura Orrù; Italy	Cecilia Baena; Colombia
Women's 1000 m sprint	Andrea González; Argentina	Jennifer Caicedo; Colombia	Jana Gegner; Germany
Women's 3000 m elimination	Cecilia Baena; Colombia	Jennifer Caicedo; Colombia	Pan Yi-chin; Chinese Taipei
Women's 5000 m points elimination	Kim Hye-mi; South Korea	Woo Hyo-sook; South Korea	Silvia Niño; Colombia
Women's 10000 m elimination	Silvia Niño; Colombia	Cecilia Baena; Colombia	Kim Hye-mi; South Korea

== Ju-jitsu ==
Event	Gold	Silver	Bronze
Men's duo	Switzerland; Remo Müller; Pascal Müller	Spain; Gil García; Àlex Barrero	France; Laurent Beard; Julien Hellouin
Men's fighting 69 kg	Christian Mattle; Denmark	Ferry Hendriks; Netherlands	Marco Dünzel; Germany
Men's fighting 77 kg	Kenneth Thiim Johansson; Denmark	Mario Staller; Germany	Julien Boussuge; France
Men's fighting 85 kg	Guillaume Piquet; France	Markus Buchholz; Germany	David Amores; Spain
Men's fighting 94 kg	Fernando Segovia; Spain	Aleksey Veselovzorov; Russia	Vincent Parisi; France
Women's duo	Germany; Stephanie Satory; Nadine Altmüller	Austria; Katharina Beisteiner; Eva Ehrlich	Belgium; Sandy Van Landeghem; Vanessa Van de Vijver
Women's fighting 55 kg	Jeanne Rasmussen; Denmark	Minerva Montero; Spain	Annabelle Reydy; France
Women's fighting 62 kg	Nicole Sydbøge; Denmark	Judith de Weerd; Netherlands	Marisol Harms; Germany
Women's fighting 70 kg	Sabine Felser; Germany	Aurora Fajardo; Spain	Lindsay Wyatt; Netherlands
Mixed duo	Germany; Matthias Huber; Corina Endele	Netherlands; Barry van Bommel; Silvia Alvarez	Switzerland; Andreas Zürcher; Marianne Schilliger

== Karate ==
Event	Gold	Silver	Bronze
Men's kata	Antonio Díaz; Venezuela	Luca Valdesi; Italy	Akio Tamashiro; Peru
Men's kumite 60 kg	Michele Giuliani; Italy	Yury Kalashnikov; Russia	Miguel Yépez; Venezuela
Men's kumite 65 kg	Dimitrios Triantafyllis; Greece	Luis Plumacher; Venezuela	Christian Grüner; Germany
Men's kumite 70 kg	Giuseppe Di Domenico; Italy	Emilio Oviedo; Mexico	Sayguidmagomed Shakhrudinov; Russia
Men's kumite 75 kg	Köksal Çakır; Germany	Konstantinos Papadopoulos; Greece	Klaudio Farmadín; Slovakia
Men's kumite 80 kg	Islamutdin Eldaruchev; Russia	Salvatore Loria; Italy	Philippe Poirier; Canada
Men's kumite +80 kg	Alexander Gerunov; Russia	Felix Kühnle; Germany	Alen Zamlić; Croatia
Men's kumite openweight	Alexander Gerunov; Russia	Shinji Nagaki; Japan	Mohamed El-Shemy; Egypt
Women's kata	Atsuko Wakai; Japan	Myriam Szkudlarek; France	Ana Martínez; Venezuela
Women's kumite 53 kg	Heba El-Sayed; Egypt	Tomoko Araga; Japan	Kora Knühmann; Germany
Women's kumite 60 kg	Snežana Pantić; Serbia and Montenegro	Maria Musall; Germany	Lejla Ferhatbegović; Bosnia and Herzegovina
Women's kumite +60 kg	Nadine Ziemer; Germany	Elisa Au; United States	Tania Weekes; Great Britain
Women's kumite openweight	Yıldız Aras; Turkey	Natasha Hardy; Australia	Nadine Ziemer; Germany

== Korfball ==
Event	Gold	Silver	Bronze
Mixed	Netherlands; Mady Tims; Sabrina Bijvank; Bregtje van Drongelen; Mirjam de Kleijn; Heleen van der Wilt; Marian de Jong; Bianca Joustra; Michiel Gerritsen; Joost Preuninger; Barry Schep; Wim Scholtmeijer; André Kuipers; Steven de Graaf; Leon Simons	Belgium; Annick Dekeyser; Annelies Vandenberghe; Bia Bouly; Britt Logisse; Sofie Goossens; Ann Vorsselmans; Debby Everaert; Mitch Lenaerts; Bart Cleyman; Gert Degenaers; Kristof Storms; Andy Gilles; Detlef Elewaut; Kevin De Waele	Czech Republic; Markéta Ježková; Martin Vaculík; Petr Malačka; Petra Škrobová; Ivo Kracík; Jan Malačka; Radka Prokůpková; Petr Pomahač; Martin Žák; Vlastimil Krejčí; Klára Zábojová; Zuzana Spěšná; Veronika Candrová; Martina Tauchmanová

== Lifesaving ==
Event	Gold	Silver	Bronze
Men's 200 m obstacle	Pierre-Yves Romanini; Belgium	Lutz Heimann; Germany	Guillem Riand; France
Men's 50 m manikin carry	Hagen Leditschke; Germany	Mauro Locchi; Italy	Fernando del Villar; Spain
Men's 100 m manikin carry fins	Nicola Ferrua; Italy	Carsten Schlepphorst; Germany	Graeme Willcox; South Africa
Men's 100 m rescue medley	Guillem Riand; France	Fernando del Villar; Spain	Sören Borch; Germany
Men's surf race	Nathan Smith; Australia	Massimiliano Eroli; Italy	Pierre-Yves Romanini; Belgium
Men's board race	Nathan Smith; Australia	Zane Holmes; Australia	Ryan Brennan; South Africa
Men's ocean	Zane Holmes; Australia	Nathan Smith; Australia	Paul Dias; South Africa
Men's team overall	Germany; Nyk Bahro; Sören Borch; Martin Bürger; Lutz Heimann; Hagen Leditschke; Carsten Schlepphorst	Spain; Carlos Alonso; Fernando del Villar; Arnau Elías; Oliver Fernández; Michael Rodríguez; Rafael Tamaral	Italy; Andrea De Stefani; Massimiliano Eroli; Nicola Ferrua; Mauro Locchi; Marco Mosconi; Germano Proietti
Women's 200 m obstacle	Erica Buratto; Italy	Sarah Windsor; Australia	Bieke Vandenabeele; Belgium
Women's 50 m manikin carry	Elena Prelle; Italy	Monique Driessen; Netherlands	Jennifer Parry; Australia
Women's 100 m manikin carry fins	Katja Popke; Germany	Monique Driessen; Netherlands	Sandra Temmerman; Netherlands
Women's 100 m rescue medley	Jennifer Parry; Australia	Elena Prelle; Italy	Alex Bannon; Australia
Women's surf race	Bieke Vandenabeele; Belgium	Maartje van Keulen; Netherlands	Irene Zamora; Spain
Women's board race	Kristy Munroe; Australia	Naomi Flood; Australia	Anaïs Riand; France
Women's ocean	Naomi Flood; Australia	Emma Wyne; Australia	Kristy Munroe; Australia
Women's team overall	Netherlands; Monique Driessen; Ineke Goossens; Anneloes Peulen; Sandra Temmerman; Maartje van Keulen	Germany; Alexandra Berlin; Aline Hundt; Stephanie Kasperski; Christine Kittel; Katja Popke; Anke Wieland	Australia; Alex Bannon; Naomi Flood; Kristy Munroe; Jennifer Parry; Sarah Windsor; Emma Wyne

== Orienteering ==
Event	Gold	Silver	Bronze
Men's middle distance	Thierry Gueorgiou; France	Daniel Hubmann; Switzerland	Øystein Kvaal Østerbø; Norway
Women's middle distance	Simone Niggli-Luder; Switzerland	Karin Schmalfeld; Germany	Heather Monro; Great Britain
Mixed relay	Switzerland; Matthias Merz; Lea Müller; Daniel Hubmann; Simone Niggli-Luder	Russia; Sergey Detkov; Aliya Sitdikova; Maxim Davydov; Tatiana Ryabkina	Czech Republic; Petr Losman; Marta Štěrbová; Tomáš Dlabaja; Dana Brožková

== Parachuting ==
Event	Gold	Silver	Bronze
Accuracy landing	István Asztalos; Hungary	Stefan Wiesner; Germany	Savaş Koçyiğit; Turkey
Canopy piloting	Jay Moledzki; Canada	Shannon Pilcher; United States	Clint Clawson; United States
Freestyle skydiving	Denmark; Nils Predstrup; Martin Kristensen	France; Robin Dubuisson; Nicolas Arnaud	Japan; Yoko Okazaki; Axel Zohmann
Freeflying	France; Stéphane Fardel; Frédéric Fugen; Vincent Reffet	Germany; Hartmut Neumann; Michael Plünnecke; Frank Täsler	United States; Trent Alkek; Stephen Boyd; Jed Lloyd
Formation skydiving	United States; Shannon Pilcher; Doug Park; Jonathan Tagle; Solly Williams	Russia; Vasily Korotkov; Alexander Kvochur; Alexey Minaev; Vadim Niyazov; Evgeny Stashchenko	Italy; Marco Arrigo; Arianna De Benedetti; Luca Marchioro; Livio Piccolo; Luca Poretti

== Powerlifting ==
Event	Gold	Silver	Bronze
Men's lightweight	Ravil Kazakov; Russia	Hsieh Tsung-ting; Chinese Taipei	Dariusz Wszoła; Poland
Men's middleweight	Andrey Tarasenko; Russia	Viktor Furazhkin; Russia	Jan Wegiera; Poland
Men's heavyweight	Nikolay Suslov; Russia	Brian Siders; United States	Ivan Freydun; Ukraine
Women's lightweight	Olesya Lafina; Russia	Olena Dmytruk; Ukraine	Chen Wei-ling; Chinese Taipei
Women's middleweight	Larysa Vitsiyevska; Ukraine	Priscilla Ribic; United States	Nadezhda Malyugina; Uzbekistan
Women's heavyweight	Marina Kudinova; Russia	Galina Karpova; Russia	Iryna Yavorska; Ukraine

== Rhythmic gymnastics ==
Event	Gold	Silver	Bronze
Women's rope	Anna Bessonova; Ukraine	Vera Sessina; Russia	Natalia Godunko; Ukraine
Women's ball	Olga Kapranova; Russia	Anna Bessonova; Ukraine	Vera Sessina; Russia
Women's clubs	Olga Kapranova; Russia	Aliya Yussupova; Kazakhstan	Natalia Godunko; Ukraine
Women's ribbon	Vera Sessina; Russia	Natalia Godunko; Ukraine	Anna Bessonova; Ukraine

== Rugby sevens ==
Event	Gold	Silver	Bronze
Men	Fiji; Jone Daunivucu; Ratu Mataluvu; Neumi Nanuku; Sireli Naqelevuki; Kameli Ratuvou; Raymond Rodan; Kini Salabogi; Waisale Serevi; Daniele Tabuakuru; Simeli Vana; Mosese Volavola	South Africa; Stefan Basson; Rayno Benjamin; Renfred Dazel; Danwel Demas; Fabian Juries; Tobela Mdaka; Zolani Mofu; Jonathan Mokuena; Marius Schoeman; Mzwandile Stick; Schalk van der Merwe	Argentina; Gonzalo Aguirre; Martín Bustos; Carlos Elder; Nicolás Fernández; Juan Ignacio Gauthier; Federico Quaglia; Andrés Romagnoli; Horacio San Martín; Marcelo Torres; Nicolás Vergallo; Alexis Weitemeier

== Sport climbing ==
Event	Gold	Silver	Bronze
Men's lead	Patxi Usobiaga; Spain	Tomáš Mrázek; Czech Republic	Shared silver
Men's lead	Patxi Usobiaga; Spain	Alexandre Chabot; France	Shared silver
Men's speed	Aleksandr Peshekhonov; Russia	Sergey Sinitsyn; Russia	Evgeny Vaytsekhovsky; Russia
Women's lead	Angela Eiter; Austria	Natalija Gros; Slovenia	Marietta Uhden; Germany
Women's speed	Anna Saulevich; Russia	Olena Ryepko; Ukraine	Tatiana Ruyga; Russia

== Squash ==
Event	Gold	Silver	Bronze
Men's singles	Peter Nicol; Great Britain	Thierry Lincou; France	Nick Matthew; Great Britain
Men's singles	Peter Nicol; Great Britain	Thierry Lincou; France	James Willstrop; Great Britain
Women's singles	Nicol David; Malaysia	Rachael Grinham; Australia	Omneya Abdel Kawy; Egypt
Women's singles	Nicol David; Malaysia	Rachael Grinham; Australia	Linda Elriani; Great Britain

== Sumo ==
Event	Gold	Silver	Bronze
Men's 85 kg	Vitaliy Tikhenko; Ukraine	Igor Kurinnoy; Russia	Yuya Hanada; Japan
Men's 115 kg	Katsuo Yoshida; Japan	Seietsu Hikage; Japan	David Tsallagov; Russia
Men's +115 kg	Keisho Shimoda; Japan	Takayuki Ichihara; Japan	Robert Paczków; Poland
Men's openweight	Takayuki Ichihara; Japan	Keisho Shimoda; Japan	Seietsu Hikage; Japan
Women's 65 kg	Alina Boykova; Ukraine	Ekaterina Salakhova; Russia	Tamami Iwai; Japan
Women's 80 kg	Svetlana Panteleeva; Russia	Satomi Ishigaya; Japan	Nicole Hehemann; Germany
Women's +80 kg	Sandra Köppen; Germany	Olesya Kovalenko; Russia	Edyta Witkowska; Poland
Women's openweight	Olesya Kovalenko; Russia	Edyta Witkowska; Poland	Ekaterina Keyb; Russia

== Trampoline gymnastics ==
Event	Gold	Silver	Bronze
Men's synchro	Germany; Michael Serth; Henrik Stehlik	Russia; Alexander Leven; Alexander Rusakov	Belarus; Mikalai Kazak; Vladimir Kakorka
Men's double mini	Radostin Rachev; Bulgaria	Denis Vachon; Canada	Nico Gärtner; Germany
Men's tumbling	Józef Wadecki; Poland	Andrei Kabishev; Belarus	Alexander Skorodumov; Russia
Women's synchro	Germany; Jessica Simon; Anna Dogonadze	Russia; Natalia Kolesnikova; Irina Karavayeva	Japan; Yoko Seto; Hiromi Hammoto
Women's double mini	Sarah Charles; Canada	Nicole Pacheco; Portugal	Shelley Klochan; United States
Women's tumbling	Olena Chabanenko; Ukraine	Anna Korobeynikova; Russia	Yuliya Hall; United States

== Tug of war ==
Event	Gold	Silver	Bronze
Men's outdoor 640 kg	Switzerland; Walter Bernhard; Hans Brändle; Daniel Christen; Peter Christen; Ueli Christen; Kilian Fellmann; Marco Halter; Edi Hurschler; Peter Lenherr; Ulrich Vonmoos; Jost Waser	Sweden; Roger Andersson; Kent Göransson; Jim Johansson; Kristoffer Johansson; Tom Johansson; Mikael Karlsson; John Lindblom; Erik Nordgren; Christer Öhman; Patrik Petersson	Germany; Andreas Berl; Thorsten Berl; Markus Böhler; Matthias Boschert; Dietmar Broghammer; Michael Broghammer; Axel Fien; Andreas Reibel; Dirk Wagner; Markus Wunderle
Men's outdoor 680 kg	Netherlands; Henk Bokdam; Wim Eggenkamp; Edwin Goorhorst; Gerolph Hoff; Egbert Jansen; Gerben Jansen; Marti Jansen; Erwin Leusink; Peter Naalden; Gerbert Schutte	Sweden; Andreas Andersson; Sten Bjomum; Johannes Bodi; Jonas Emanuelsson; Weine Gustavsson; Torbjörn Haraldsson; Bernt Järnepalm; Jesper Persson; Göran Strandahl	Ireland; Gerard Ferguson; Dermot Kehoe; James Kehoe; Joseph Kehoe; Laurence Kehoe; Martin Kehoe; Oliver Kehoe; William Kehoe; Joseph McGloin; Seamus Ryan
Women's indoor 520 kg	Chinese Taipei; Chen Ching-yi; Chen Li-hui; Chen Tzuen-long; Cheng Shu-fang; Hsu Yu-ling; Ko Chia-wen; Kuo Jyh-hwei; Lee Tzu-yi; Liu Mei-fang; Wang Chia-chi; Yang Shih-yu	Japan; Masami Hatsuoka; Reiko Komukai; Yoshie Komuro	Netherlands; Marleen Dijk; Tanja Dobbe; Annelies Hilhorst; Maaike Hornstra; Alberdien Olde Olthof; Grietje Stoker; Fiona van der Velde; Gerda van der Wal; Jolanda Vergeer; Moniek Vieveen

== Water skiing ==
Event	Gold	Silver	Bronze
Men's ski overall	Ryan Green; Australia	Rodrigo Miranda; Chile	Oleg Deviatovski; Belarus
Men's barefoot overall	David Small; Great Britain	Patrick Wehner; France	Evert Aartsen; Finland
Men's wakeboarding	Phillip Soven; United States	Matt Lammers; South Africa	Matthias Koban; Switzerland
Men's cable wakeboarding	Josh Rice; United States	Benjamin Süß; Germany	Nick Davies; Great Britain
Women's ski overall	Tarah Benzel; United States	Megan Ross; New Zealand	Jenna Mielzynski; Canada
Women's barefoot overall	Kirsten Grønvik; Norway	Gizella Halasz; Australia	Emily Goldie; Great Britain
Women's wakeboarding	Chen Lili; China	Megan McNeil; United States	Roberta Rendo; Argentina
Women's cable wakeboarding	Denise de Haan; Netherlands	Kirsten Leifels; Germany	Pauline Dyrschka; Germany

== Invitational sports ==
=== American football ===
Event	Gold	Silver	Bronze
Men	Germany; Martin Falkowski; Daniel Slupinsky; Matthias Weil; Albert Falkowski; Jörg Heckenbach; John Paul Schmuck; Björn Dreier; Florian Bambuch; Joachim Ullrich; Mike Friese; Sebastian Tuch; Markus Schuster; Oliver Radke; Sebastian Borowski; Julian Hennek; Christian Poschmann; Ronny Freudenberg; Hendrik Voß; André Krüger; Stefan Wesche; Christian von Einem; Markus Bleker; Michael Elsen; Franco Ingravalle; Benedikt Baumann; Frank Söhlke; Rolf Haas; Patrick Hansen; David Odenthal; Andre Mathes; Dennis Engelbrecht; Christoph Königsmann; Julian Pjanic; Raphael Lianos-Farfan; Stefan Grundmann ulius Sidoroff; Antony Doghmi; Maximilian von Garnier; Sebastian Judis; Marc Biedenkapp; Markus Schöpf; Alexej Mittendorf; Thomas Rauch; Klaas Nuttbohn; Gunnar Winkler	Sweden; Carl-Johan Haraldsson; Håkan Eriksson; Kim Blidkvist; David Jonsson; Rashid Belkacem; Petter Ehrnvall; Fredrik Haraldsson; Magnus Lundqvist; Ronald Biro; Pelle Björnhammar; Patrik Lundqvist; Henrik Hegardt; Tobias Rivelius; Kim Taalbi; Johan Larsson; Pontus Bondesson; Ola Rugeland; Roger Nilsson; Christoffer Blanck; Martin Kvarnmark; Christian Lövgren; Erik Fröstad; Magnus Dahlin; Calle Bäckström; Marcus Berggren; Björn Strandberg; Jonas Renström; Mikael Löhr; Thomas Löhr; Eric Ahlberg; David Krystalowizc; Philip Wendt; Christian Malm; Oscar Dahlman; Johan Perlström; Seidou Abdel Mainou; Johan Ingerman; Jens Alnervik; Fredrik Pihlbäck; Carl Carlsson; Sigurdur Josuason; Ola Schön; Thomas Falkelind; Fredrik Flyghed; Mikael Andersson	France; Philippe Gardent; Franck Galvin; Marc Marie; Kevin Katouzian; Stéphane Murat; William Leonardo de Sa; Guillaume Bazile; Patrick Couton; Cédric Cabarrus; Jean-Françis Franco; Nuno Dos Santos; Guillaume Courtois; Emmanuel Charret; Sandino Octobre; Rémi Rousset; Ivan Wojciechowski; Laurent Marceline; Fabien Ferreira; Walter Kack Kack; Damien Signori; Nefala Biyogo-Nkukuma; Ken Saint-Eloy; Thomas Chakarian; Baptiste Noir; Jérémy Castinel; Franck Blandanel; Nicolas Prévost; Sébastien Manfredi; Kamel Belkolli; Eric Girier Dufournier; Steeve Guersent; Fabrice Pineau; Gilles Puget; Jean-Philippe Eldin; Sébastien Henry; Laurent Polinière; Fabien Ducousso; Raphaël Amann; Bounouar Mellak; Cyril Windholtz; Eric Guyon; Jérémy Larroque; Francesco Pepe Esposito; Marc Baudlet; Georges Bouaziz

=== Beach handball ===
Event	Gold	Silver	Bronze
Men	Russia; Mikhail Izmailov; Aleksey Pshenichniy; Sergey Predybailov; Aleksey Egov; Evgeny Zotin; Vladimir Poletaev; Aleksandr Nikora; Dmitry Fedorov; Konstantin Igropulo; Mikhail Gromov	Spain; Javier García; Alberto Cervera; Sebastián Hernández; Juan Carlos Zapardiel; Pedro Bago; José Fernández; Javier de las Cuevas; Armand Torrego; Jaime Fernández; Tomas Ramírez	Croatia; Andro Vladušić; Matija Černetić; Sandro Uvodić; Tomislav Sladoljev; Anto Koroljević; Hrvoje Biuklić; Luka Pejčić; Trpimir Petrač; Tomislav Mesarov; Davor Rokavec
Women	Brazil; Mayssa Pessoa; Cinthya Piquet; Emanuelle Moreira; Marjory dos Santos; Maria José Batista de Sales; Edna Márcia Costa; Jerusa Dias; Darlene Silva; Idalina Mesquita; Taissi da Costa	Hungary; Rita Pásztor; Melinda Szélesi; Barbara Ács; Renáta Kévés; Judit Pavelekné Kovács; Beatrix Simonné Hingyi; Ildikó Megyes; Brigitta Varga; Ágnes Kocsis; Piroska Balogh	Turkey; Sevilay İmamoğlu; Esra Önal; Çiğdem Özcan; Sibel Karausta; Yeliz Yılmaz; Serpil İskenderoğlu; Senar Yeşilbayır; Serpil Soylu; Güneş Atabay; Öznur Müge Alp

=== Dragon boat ===
Event	Gold	Silver	Bronze
Mixed 200 m	Russia	Switzerland	Germany
Mixed 500 m	Russia	Switzerland	Germany
Mixed 1000 m	Czech Republic	Germany	Russia
Mixed 2000 m	Germany	Russia	Sweden

=== Indoor hockey ===
Event	Gold	Silver	Bronze
Men	Germany; Nils Kowalczek; Johannes Blank; Christian Domke; Philip Sunkel; Oliver Domke; Christoph Eimer; Björn Emmerling; Michael Green; Florian Kunz; Christoph Bechmann; Hendrik Lange; Christian Mayerhöfer	Switzerland; Lukas Spörri; Thomas Gähwiler; Philip Keller; Fabian Wullschleger; Uli Bergmann; Roman Richner; Philipp Bernhard; Maurice Brozzo; Tobias Bergmann; Beat Bremgartner; Michael Kloter; Dominic Wullschleger	Czech Republic; Filip Neusser; Tomáš Formánek; Aleš Peřinka; Lukáš Lahoda; Pavel Bárta; Tomáš Procházka; Štěpán Bernátek; Filip Jaroš; Martin Toms; Tomáš Herzog; Richard Kotrč; Ondřej Vudmaska
Women	Germany; Denise Klecker; Birgit Borkamm; Melanie Cremer; Lisa Küfer; Cornelia Reiter; Lena Grabowski; Anneke Böhmert; Franziska Gude; Julia Zwehl; Frederike Puls; Kerstin Holm; Gylla Rau	Belarus; Tatsiana Fedchanka; Viktoryia Mamantava; Veranika Pekhtereva; Iryna Tymul; Yulia Laptsevich; Alena Nekhai; Iryna Halavinova; Iryna Kazachok; Volha Saroka; Nadzeya Uladimirava; Volha Shyntar; Marina Rusina	Czech Republic; Markéta Matějovská; Lenka Brtvová; Eva Staňková; Karolína Mikešová; Květa Kučerová; Martina Kejklíčková; Jana Mrzenová; Klára Poloprutská; Jana Šplíchalová; Martina Horová; Štěpánka Šmídová; Lucie Marková

=== Indoor motorcycle trials ===
Event	Gold	Silver	Bronze
Men's team	Spain; Jeroni Fajardo; Marc Freixa; Adam Raga	Great Britain; Steve Colley; Graham Jarvis; Dougie Lampkin	Japan; Takahisa Fujinami; Kenichi Kuroyama; Fumitaka Nozaki
