= 2006 Acrobatic Gymnastics World Championships =

20th Acrobatic Gymnastics World Championships
- Location: Coimbra, Portugal
- Start date: 14 June 2006
- End date: 17 June 2006
- Competitors: 39 from 7 nations

The 2006 Acrobatic Gymnastics World Championships were held in Coimbra, Portugal from 14-17 June 2006. This was the first time the competition was called the "Acrobatic Gymnastics World Championships" after previously being called the "World Sports Acrobatics Championships".

== Medal table ==
Rank	Nation	Gold	Silver	Bronze	Total
1	Russia	2	4	0	6
2	Ukraine	1	1	0	2
3	Belarus	1	0	1	2
4	Great Britain	1	0	0	1
5	China	0	0	2	2
6	Poland	0	0	1	1
6	United States	0	0	1	1
Totals (7 entries)		5	5	5	15

== Results ==
=== Men's Group ===
Rank	Team	Country	Point
Gold medal	Andrew Price, Adam Denny, Adam Dobbs, Adam Smith	United Kingdom	28.450
Silver medal	Olexander Bondarenko, Vladimir Boychuk, Vladislav Gluchenko, Andrei Perunov	Ukraine	28.303
Bronze medal	Shen Tao, Chen Liang, Xu Run, Wang Zhen	China	28.065
4	Artem Trifonov, Igor Zarudny, Alexander Chemodanov, Sergei Shetinin	Russia	27.802
5	Christopher McGreevy, Mark Poole, Alexander Uttley, Jack Atherton	United Kingdom	27.660
6	Roman Kenjaev, Alexei Puzyrov, Konstantin Kostin, Nurat Smagulov	Kazakhstan	25.856

=== Men's Pair ===
Rank	Team	Country	Point
Gold medal	Serhiy Popov, Mykola Shcherbak	Ukraine	29.257
Silver medal	Alexei Dudchenko, Konstantin Pilipchuk	Russia	28.862
Bronze medal	Adrian Czyz, Pavel Walczweski	Poland	28.151
4	Mark Fyson, Christopher Jones	United Kingdom	28.054
5	Edward Upcott, Reece Durbridge	United Kingdom	27.957
6	Hugo Teixeira, Telmo Dias	Portugal	27.580

=== Mixed Pair ===
Rank	Team	Country	Point
Gold medal	Revaz Gurgenidze, Anna Katchalova	Russia	29.252
Silver medal	Maria Kovtun, Anton Glazkov	Russia	28.751
Bronze medal	Michael Rodrigues, Clare Brunson	United States	28.650
4	Robert Tregonin, Alexandra Grayson	United Kingdom	28.555
5	Beata Surimak, Lukasz Misztela	Poland	28.402
6	Sergei Zabiyaka, Alona Burlachenko	Ukraine	27.967
7	Nedko Kostadinov, Ivona Stefanova	Bulgaria	27.860
8	Maik Duijhouwer, Ellen Vorsselman	Netherlands	27.680

=== Women's Group ===
Rank	Team	Country	Point
Gold medal	Elena Kirilova, Elena Moiseeva, Tatiana Alexeeva	Russia	28.900
Silver medal	Ekaterina Stroynova, Ekaterina Loginova, Albina Zinnurova	Russia	28.889
Bronze medal	Maria Girut, Tatiana Motuz, Alina Starevich	Belarus	28.302
4	Anna Gorbatenko, Olena Nepytaeva, Olga Vorchuk	Ukraine	28.154
5	Emily Collins, Victoria Lamekin, Leanne Turner	United Kingdom	28.070
6	Tisa Penny, Allysha Kidd, Mariah Henniger	United States	27.751
7	Erin Jameson, Claire-Louise Thompson, Grace Blacklock	United Kingdom	27.500
8	Corinne Van Hombeeck, Maaike Croket, Soen Geirnaert	Belgium	26.910

=== Women's Pair ===
Rank	Team	Country	Point
Gold medal	Katsiaryna Murashko, Alina Yushko	Belarus	28.530
Silver medal	Anna Melnikova, Yanna Cholaeva	Russia	28.307
Bronze medal	Wang Zhiyue, Liu Yiting	China	28.266
4	Marina Novikova, Elena Faleva	Russia	28.220
5	Elena Zhornyak, Anastasia Lomachenko	Ukraine	28.140
6	Natalia Kakhntuk, Kristina Maraziuk	Belarus	27.740
