= 2004 World Sports Acrobatics Championships =

19th World Sports Acrobatics Championships
- Location: Liévin, France
- Start date: 21 May 2004
- End date: 23 May 2004
- Competitors: 39 from 5 nations

The 2004 World Sports Acrobatics Championships were held in Liévin, France from 21 May to 23 May 2004.

== Medal table ==
Rank	Nation	Gold	Silver	Bronze	Total
1	Russia	4	3	0	7
2	United States	1	0	1	2
3	Ukraine	0	1	3	4
4	Australia	0	1	0	1
5	Bulgaria	0	0	1	1
Totals (5 entries)		5	5	5	15

== Results ==
=== Men's Group ===
Rank	Team	Country	Point
Gold medal	Roman Khairullin, Denis Gircha, Nikolai Glushchenko, Dimitri Shilov	Russia	19.070
Silver medal	Andrii Bondarenko, Olexander Bondarenko, Vladislav Gluchenko, Andrei Perunov	Ukraine	18.770
Bronze medal	Sezgin Ahmedov, Valeri Filipov, Yordan Markov, Ivan Lazarov	Bulgaria	18.690
4	Shen Tao, Chen Liang, Xu Run, Wang Zhen	China	18.670
5	Ricardo Figueirinha, Bruno Oliveira, Joao Godinho, David Batista	Portugal	18.040
6	Alexei Starodubtsev, Sergei Golenko, Pavel Korshunov, Yuri Kuznetsov	Russia	17.260
7	Stuart McKenzie, David Scott, Barry Hindson, Scott Patterson	United Kingdom	16.050
8	Sebastien Zarkowski, Martin Walczak, Tomasz Zuberek, Andrei Zumanow	Poland	14.500

=== Men's Pair ===
Rank	Team	Country	Point
Gold medal	Ervin Mendikov, Alexei Mochechkin	Russia	18.780
Silver medal	Andrei Chadrin, Dimitri Chulimanov	Russia	18.530
Bronze medal	Serhiy Popov, Mykola Shcherbak	Ukraine	18.220
4	Xi Shengchao, Ji Chengang	China	17.740
5	Anton Ivanov, Radostin Nikolov	Bulgaria	17.510
6	Mark Fyson, Christopher Jones	United Kingdom	17.230
7	Alexei Dudko, Dzianis Vidunov	Belarus	16.470
8	Rafael Aliev, Eugeny Drozdov	Kazakhstan	16.080

=== Mixed Pair ===
Rank	Team	Country	Point
Gold medal	Shenea Booth, Arthur Davis	United States	20.640
Silver medal	Revaz Gurgenidze, Anna Katchalova	Russia	20.210
Bronze medal	Sergei Pelepets, Marina Chevchuk	Ukraine	18.000
4	Tomasz Kapuscinski, Beata Surmiak	Poland	17.610
5	Yves Van Der Donckt, Tiffany Cuyt	Belgium	17.540
6	Manuel Martins, Ines Rodrigues	Portugal	17.140
7	Chen Feifei, Li Huiguan	China	15.160
8	Nedko Kostadinov, Albena Alexandrova	Bulgaria	15.000

=== Women's Group ===
Rank	Team	Country	Point
Gold medal	Ekaterina Stroynova, Ekaterina Loginova, Gouzel Khassanova	Russia	22.420
Silver medal	Jessica Stamenovic, Tara Bushbridge, Veronica Gravolin	Australia	19.670
Bronze medal	Danielle Heider, Samantha Schabow, Jennifer Da Silva	United States	19.630
4	Olexandra Gorkovenko, Alla Basiuk, Larisa Semeniuk	Ukraine	19.210
5	Elena Kirilova, Elena Moiseeva, Tatiana Alexeeva	Russia	18.990
6	Gaukhar Ahmetova, Alexandra Yenina, Aigul Dukenbayeva	Kazakhstan	18.910
7	Yvonne Weish, Stefanie Akroyd, Victoria Pattison	United Kingdom	18.810
8	Sophie Schwassmann, Susanne Schaeffer, Natalia Arent	Germany	17.610

=== Women's Pair ===
Rank	Team	Country	Point
Gold medal	Anna Mokhova, Yulia Lopatkina	Russia	18.620
Silver medal	Anna Melnikova, Yanna Cholaeva	Russia	17.880
Bronze medal	Irina Lobodzinska, Yulia Kravchenko	Ukraine	17.390
4	Elizabeth Olivier, Christine Leach	United Kingdom	17.390
5	Leigh Simpson, Lauren Belchamber	United Kingdom	16.700
6	Wu Jin Mei, Shi Dan Ying	China	16.170
7	Pauline Diender, Margaretha Plantenga	Netherlands	15.930
8	Natalia Ossolodkova, Nelli Pak	Kazakhstan	14.820
