= 2002 World Sports Acrobatics Championships =

18th World Sports Acrobatics Championships
- Venue: Erdgas Arena
- Location: Riesa, Germany
- Start date: 27 September 2002
- End date: 29 September 2002
- Competitors: 39 from 7 nations

The 2002 World Sports Acrobatics Championships were held in Riesa, Germany from 27 September to 29 September 2002, at the Erdgas Arena.

== Medal table ==
Rank	Nation	Gold	Silver	Bronze	Total
1	Russia	4	0	0	4
2	China	1	1	2	4
3	Great Britain	0	1	1	2
3	Ukraine	0	1	1	2
5	Belgium	0	1	0	1
5	United States	0	1	0	1
7	Bulgaria	0	0	1	1
Totals (7 entries)		5	5	5	15

== Results ==
=== Men's Group ===
Rank	Team	Country	Point
Gold medal	Dimitri Shilov, Grigori Shinkarev, Denis Gircha, Roman Khairullin	Russia	17.640
Silver medal	Barry Hindson, Stuart Mckenze, Scott Patterson, David Scott	United Kingdom	16.530
Bronze medal	Feng Liu, Huifeng Liu, Song Yan, Xin Hu	China	16.350
4	Volodimir Snitko, Serguei Dlink, Vladislav Krasovski, Alexander Kirilov	Ukraine	16.150
5	Yordan Markov, Valeri Filipov, Ivan Lazarov, Sezgin ahmedov	Russia	16.050
6	João Oliveira, Pedro Emidio, Joao Godinho, Victor Silva	Portugal	15.490

=== Men's Pair ===
Rank	Team	Country	Point
Gold medal	Min Song, Renjie Li	China	17.660
Silver medal	Philippe Van VynCkt, Kenny Dewulf	Belgium	17.020
Bronze medal	Radostin Nikolov, Anton Ivanov	Bulgaria	16.930
4	Marcin Drabicki Dariusz Nowak	Poland	16.540
5	Ivo Vilaca, Nuno Vidal	Portugal	15.940
6	Leonid Tsibri, Serguei Postemski	Ukraine	15.870
7	Carl Morritt, Christopher Jones	United Kingdom	15.570
8	Rafael Aliev, Eugeny Drozdov	Kazakhstan	14.810

=== Mixed Pair ===
Rank	Team	Country	Point
Gold medal	Elena Kirajanova, Yuri Trubitsin	Russia	18.760
Gold medal	Shenea Booth, Arthur Davis	United States	18.760
Bronze medal	Lisa Hobby, Patrick Bonner	United Kingdom	17.610
4	Chenchen Cai Enming Hu	China	17.030
5	Daria Pechkunova, Stanislav Barbarykin	Kazakhstan	16.880
6	Katerina Polyanska, Artem Valiyev	Ukraine	16.710
7	Ines Gomes, Jorge Carvalho	Portugal	15.810
8	Jenifer Cochet, Johann Fournond	France	15.630

=== Women's Group ===
Rank	Team	Country	Point
Gold medal	Evengenia Kasjanova, Ekaterina Vinogradova, Gouzel Khassanova	Russia	18.040
Silver medal	Jing Lu, Xiao Hui Xan, Jun Lian Hu	China	18.180
Bronze medal	Viktoria Zherdyeva, Irina Buga, Sofia Mezentseva	Ukraine	17.830
4	Elena Armenis, Tara Busbridge, Veronica Gravolin	Australia	17.240
5	Viktoria Arabei, Zinaida Sazonava Katarina katsuba	Belarus	17.190
6	katie Lawton, Lauren belchamber	United Kingdom	16.590
7	Katarzyna Majawska, Anna Godek, Joanna Pokwapisz	Poland	15.650
8	Tina Liebau, Tina Redelstorff, Sophie Schwassmann	Germany	5.900

=== Women's Pair ===
Rank	Team	Country	Point
Gold medal	Yulia Lopatkina, Anna Mokhova	Russia	17.590
Silver medal	Yulia Konko, Tatiana Ukolova	Ukraine	16.980
Bronze medal	Jin Mei Wu, Dan Ying Shi	China	16.590
4	Natalia Oleynikova, Eugenia Bogomaz	Kazakhstan	15.930
5	Jessica Gardner, Nicolette Bonhert	United States	15.440
6	Katarzyna Torkaska, Beata Surmiak	Poland	14.700

== Medal table ==
Rank	Nation	Gold	Silver	Bronze	Total
1	Russia (RUS)	4	0	0	4
2	China (CHN)	1	1	2	4
3	United States (USA)	1	0	0	1
4	Great Britain (GBR)	0	1	1	2
4	Ukraine (UKR)	0	1	1	2
6	Belgium (BEL)	0	1	0	1
7	Bulgaria (BUL)	0	0	1	1
Totals (7 entries)		6	4	5	15
