= Victoria Pattison =

Victoria Pattison may refer to:

- Vicky Pattison, English TV personality
- Victoria Pattison (gymnast) in 2004 World Sports Acrobatics Championships
