= Michael Rodríguez =

Michael Rodríguez may refer to:

- Michael Rodríguez (footballer) (born 1981), Costa Rican footballer
- Michael Rodríguez (cyclist) (born 1989), Colombian road racing cyclist
- Michael Rodriguez (acrobatic gymnast) (born 1982)
- Michael Anthony Rodriguez (1962–2008), member of the Texas Seven
- Michael Rodriguez (politician), member of Chicago City Council

== See also ==
- Michael Rodrigues (disambiguation)
