= Konstantin Pilipchuk =

Russian acrobatic gymnast

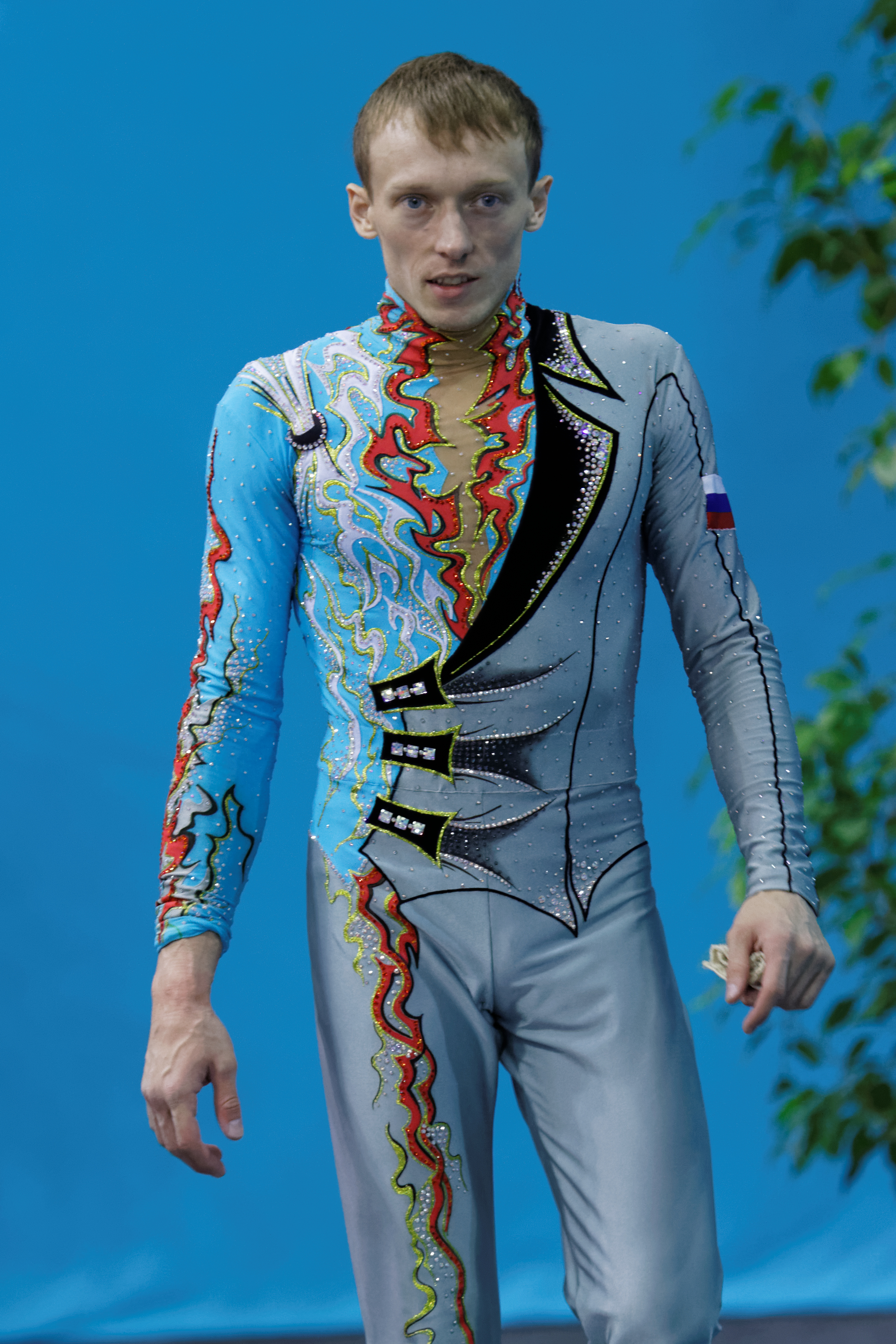
- Konstantin Pilipchuk at the 2014 Acrobatic Gymnastics World Championships

Personal information
- Born: 20 December 1986 (age 39)

Gymnastics career
- Discipline: Acrobatic gymnastics
- Country represented: Russia
Medal record
World Games
Silver medal – second place	2009 Kaohsiung	Men's Pair
Gold medal – first place	2013 Cali	Men's Pair
World Cup
Gold medal – first place	2011 Vityazevo	Men's Pair
World Championships
Silver medal – second place	2006 Coimbra	Men's Pair
Silver medal – second place	2008 Wrocław	Men's Pair
Silver medal – second place	2010 Wrocław	Men's Pair
Gold medal – first place	2012 Lake Buena Vista	Men's Pair
Gold medal – first place	2014 Levallois-Perret	Men's Pair
European Championships
Gold medal – first place	2007 Hertogenbosch	Men's Pair
Gold medal – first place	2009 Vila do Conde	Men's Pair
Gold medal – first place	2011 Varna	Men's Pair
Gold medal – first place	2013 Odivelas	Men's Pair

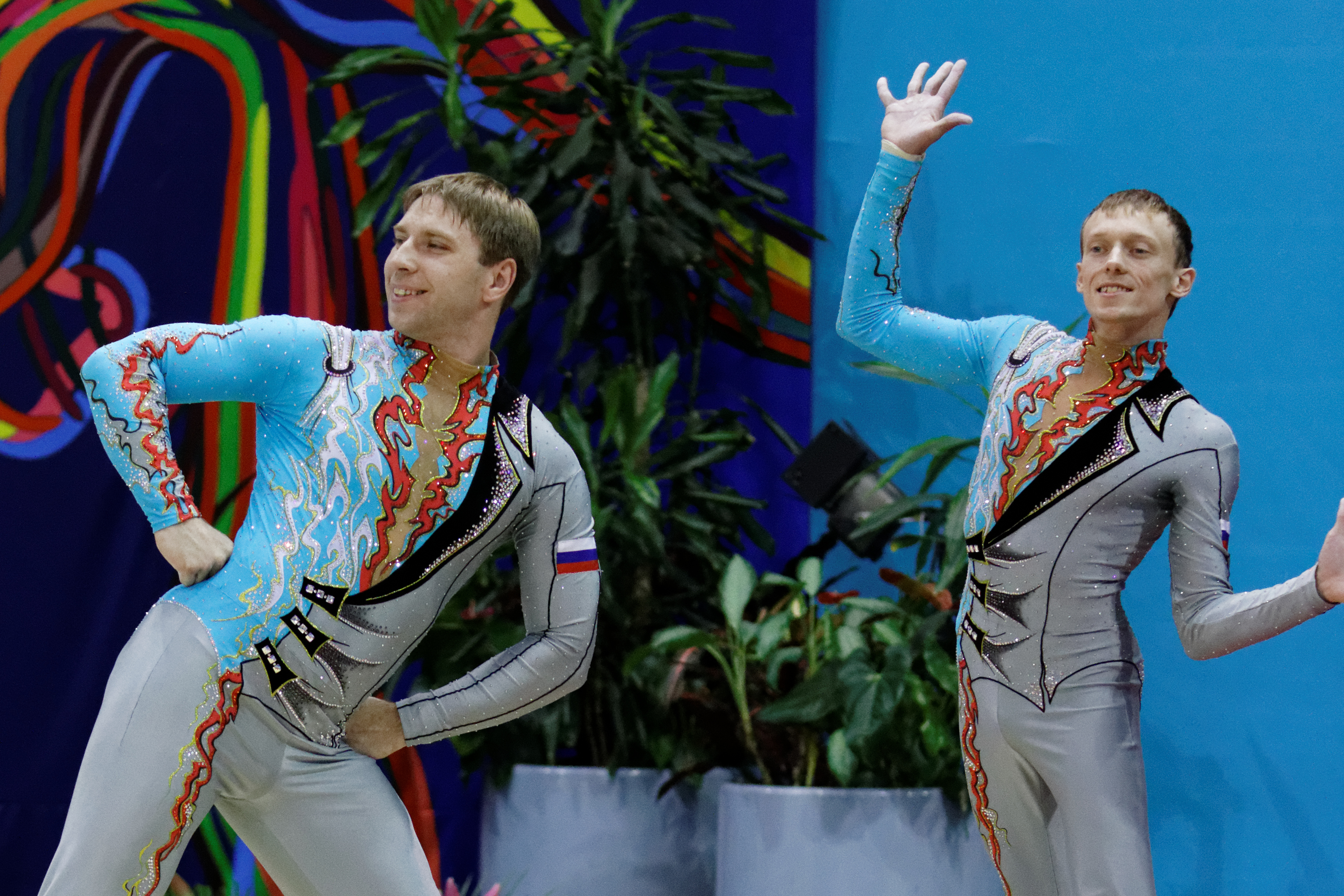
Konstantin Pilipchuk (right) and Alexei Dudchenko at the 2014 Acrobatic Gymnastics World Championships.

Konstantin Pilipchuk (born 20 December 1986) is a Russian male acrobatic gymnast medalled at five Acrobatic Gymnastics World Championships. In partnership with Alexei Dudchenko, he is a two-times world champion in men's pairs, winning in the 2012 and 2014. He won silver medals at the 2006, 2008 and 2010. Along with Dudchenko, he also won silver medal on the 2009 World Games, gold medal on the 2013 World Games and is a four-time European champion.

He was one of Rostov's torchbearers in the 2014 Winter Olympics torch relay.
