= Clare Brunson =

American acrobatic gymnast

- Born: November 6, 1989 (age 36)

Gymnastics career
- Discipline: Acrobatic gymnastics
- Country represented: United States
- Gym: Empire AcroGymnastics, Mission Hills Gymnastics, Realis Gymnastics Academy
- Head coach: Youri Vorobyev

Clare Brunson
Medal record

Representing United States

Acrobatic gymnastics

World Championships
| Bronze medal – third place | 2006 World Championships | Coimbra, Portugal |

World Cup
| Silver medal – second place | 2006 World Cup | Puurs, Belgium |

Clare Brunson (born November 6, 1989) is a retired elite acrobatic gymnast who competed as the top in a mixed-pair team with elite acrobatic gymnast Michael Rodrigues, also now retired.

Brunson and Rodrigues were the second U.S. mixed pair (after Arthur Davis and Shenea Booth) to medal at the Acrobatic Gymnastics World Championships, earning the bronze medal in the all-around at the 2006 World Championships in Coimbra, Portugal.

Also in 2006, Rodrigues and Brunson won the all-around silver medal at the 2006 World Cup in Puurs, Belgium, and they won the all-around, dynamic and balance at the U.S. National Acrobatic Gymnastics Championships for the second straight year.

In 2005, Rodrigues and Brunson placed fourth all-around at the 2005 World Games in Duisburg, Germany.

Brunson and Rodrigues also won their first national all-around title in 2005, placing first in the all-around, dynamic and balance at the 2005 U.S. National Championships in Louisville, Kentucky.

The pair trained together at Empire AcroGymnastics in Riverside, California, Mission Hills Gymnastics, also in Riverside, and Realis Gymnastics Academy in Moreno Valley, California. Their coaches included Youri Vorobyev, who is now owner and head coach of Realis Gymnastics Academy.

Prior to her partnership with Rodrigues, Brunson also competed as the top in a mixed pair with elite acrobatic gymnast Kristopher Duncan (now retired). Brunson and Duncan trained together at Empire AcroGymnastics.

Brunson and Duncan placed second all-around in the 12–19 category at the 2004 International Age Group Games in Liévin, France.

The pair also placed second all-around at the U.S. National Championships in Palm Springs, California, where they also earned second-place finishes in dynamic and balance.

Prior to her partnership with Duncan, Brunson competed as the top in a women’s pair with acrobatic gymnast Olivia Solo (now retired). In 2002, the pair won the all-around at the Flanders International Acro Cup in Puurs, and they placed second all-around at the 2002 World Age Group Games in Riesa, Germany.

Brunson and Solo placed second all-around at the 2002 U.S. National Championships in New Orleans. The pair trained together at Empire.

While Brunson competed as an elite athlete, she also worked as a performer at SeaWorld in San Diego and at the San Diego Zoo.
