= Slovakia at the World Games =

- IOC code: SVK
- NOC: Slovak Olympic and Sports Committee
- Website: www.olympic.sk (in Slovak)
- Medals: Gold 7 Silver 12 Bronze 14 Total 33

World Games appearances (overview)
- 1981; 1985; 1989; 1993; 1997; 2001; 2005; 2009; 2013; 2017; 2022; 2025

Slovakia first participated at the World Games at the 1993 World Games and since then participated in all World Games.

== Medal count ==
World Games	Gold	Silver	Bronze		Rank
1981–1989	part of Czechoslovakia				
(Netherlands) 1993 The Hague	0	0	0	0	-
(Finland) 1997 Lahti	1	2	2	5	24
(Japan) 2001 Akita	1	1	1	3	24
(Germany) 2005 Duisburg	1	2	1	4	26
(Chinese Taipei) 2009 Kaohsiung	2	3	3	8	19
(Colombia) 2013 Cali	0	0	0	0	-
(Poland) 2017 Wrocław	0	1	2	3	57
(United States) 2022 Birmingham	1	1	2	4	39
(China) 2025 Chengdu	1	2	3	6	39
(Germany) 2029 Karlsruhe	Future events				
Total	7	12	14	33	40

=== Medals by sport ===
Sport	Gold	Silver	Bronze	Total
Bodybuilding	3	4	3	10
Karate	1	2	3	6
Casting	1	1	1	3
Muaythai	1	0	1	2
Archery	1	0	0	1
Kickboxing	0	3	1	4
Air Sports - Parachuting	0	1	0	1
Orienteering	0	1	0	1
Powerboating	0	0	2	2
Finswimming	0	0	1	1
Gymnastics	0	0	1	1
Water skiing	0	0	1	1
Totals (12 entries)	7	12	14	33

== List of medalists ==
Medal	Name	Games	Sport	Event
Gold	Ján Meszároš	(Finland) 1997 Lahti	Casting	Men's Spinning Distance Single Handed
Silver	Róbert Meszároš	(Finland) 1997 Lahti	Casting	Men's Fly Distance Single Handed
Silver	Michal Šebesta	(Finland) 1997 Lahti	Karate	Men's Kumite 60 kg
Bronze	Ján Meszároš	(Finland) 1997 Lahti	Casting	Men's Spinning Accuracy
Bronze	Barbara Vadovičová	(Finland) 1997 Lahti	Gymnastics	Women's aerobics
Gold	Igor Kočiš	(Japan) 2001 Akita	Bodybuilding	Men's 70 kg
Silver	Juraj Vrábel	(Japan) 2001 Akita	Bodybuilding	Men's 80 kg
Bronze	Jana Purdjaková	(Japan) 2001 Akita	Bodybuilding	Women's +52 kg
Gold	Juraj Vrábel	(Germany) 2005 Duisburg	Bodybuilding	Men's 80 kg
Silver	Igor Kočiš	(Germany) 2005 Duisburg	Bodybuilding	Men's 75 kg
Silver	Aurélia Grožajová	(Germany) 2005 Duisburg	Bodybuilding	Women's +52 kg
Bronze	Klaudio Farmadin	(Germany) 2005 Duisburg	Karate	Men's Kumite 75 kg
Gold	Jana Purdjaková	(Chinese Taipei) 2009 Kaohsiung	Bodybuilding	Women's Lightweight
Gold	Eva Medveďová-Tulejová	(Chinese Taipei) 2009 Kaohsiung	Karate	Women's Kumite open
Silver	Eva Medveďová-Tulejová	(Chinese Taipei) 2009 Kaohsiung	Karate	Women's Kumite 60 kg
Silver	Igor Kočiš	(Chinese Taipei) 2009 Kaohsiung	Bodybuilding	Men's Welterweight
Silver	Róbert Juriš	(Chinese Taipei) 2009 Kaohsiung	Parachuting	Accuracy Landing
Bronze	Peter Tatárka	(Chinese Taipei) 2009 Kaohsiung	Bodybuilding	Men's Heavyweight
Bronze	Anna Mozolány-Urbaníková	(Chinese Taipei) 2009 Kaohsiung	Bodybuilding	Women's Fitness
Bronze	Martin Bartalský	(Chinese Taipei) 2009 Kaohsiung	Water skiing	Men's Three event
Silver	Monika Chochlíková	(Poland) 2017 Wrocław	Kickboxing	Women's 52 kg
Bronze	Veronika Cmárová	(Poland) 2017 Wrocław	Kickboxing	Women's 65 kg
Bronze	Ingrida Suchánková	(Poland) 2017 Wrocław	Karate	Women's Kumite 61 kg
Gold	Monika Chochlíková	(United States) 2022 Birmingham	Muaythai	Women's 51 kg
Silver	Alexandra Filipová	(United States) 2022 Birmingham	Kickboxing	Women's 70 kg
Bronze	Zuzana Hrašková	(United States) 2022 Birmingham	Finswimming	Women's 100 m bi-fins
Bronze	Ingrida Suchánková	(United States) 2022 Birmingham	Karate	Women's kumite 61 kg
Gold	Denisa Baránková	(China) 2025 Chengdu	Archery	Women's Middle distance
Silver	Tereza Šmelíková	(China) 2025 Chengdu	Orienteering	Women's Recurve
Silver	Lucia Cmárová	(China) 2025 Chengdu	Kickboxing	Women's 60 kg
Bronze	Monika Chochlíková	(China) 2025 Chengdu	Muaythai	Women's 54 kg
Bronze	Emma Strculová	(China) 2025 Chengdu	Powerboating	Women's MotoSurf Single
Bronze	Sára Žuborová; Marek Škamla	(China) 2025 Chengdu	Powerboating	Nations Cup

== See also ==
- Slovakia at the Youth Olympics
- Slovakia at the Olympics
- Slovakia at the Paralympics
- Slovakia at the European Youth Olympic Festival
- Slovakia at the European Games
- Slovakia at the Universiade
