= Michael Rodrigues =

Michael Rodrigues may refer to:

- Michael Rodrigues (politician) (born 1959), Democratic member of the Massachusetts Senate
- Michael Rodrigues (table tennis), Pakistani table tennis player
- Michael Rodrigues (acrobatic gymnast) (born 1982), American acrobatic gymnast

== See also ==
- Michael Rodríguez (disambiguation)
