= Youri Vorobyev =

Acrobatic gymnastics coach

Youri Germanovich Vorobyev (Russian: Юрий Германович Воробьев) is a Soviet-born coach of acrobatic gymnastics who produced more than a dozen world-championship acrobatic gymnasts during his coaching career in the Soviet Union and Russia.

He currently resides and coaches in the U.S. state of California. He is the owner and head coach at Realis Gymnastics Academy in Southern California’s Moreno Valley, which is the training facility for seven members of the 2011 junior and senior U.S. national acrobatic gymnastics teams.

Vorobyev’s odyssey from Russia to the United States began when he met U.S. mixed-pair gymnast Arthur Davis of Empire AcroGymnastics at a competition in Belgium. The gymnast's parents assisted Vorobyev with the legal process of gaining residency in the U.S., where Vorobyev then began to coach their son and his mixed-pair partner, Shenea Booth, at Empire AcroGymnastics in Riverside, California.

Under Vorobyev’s tutelage, Davis and Booth became the first U.S. athletes to win the mixed-pair all-around gold medal at the 2002 Sports Acrobatics World Championships in Riesa, Germany. (The sport now known as acrobatic gymnastics was called sports acrobatics until the mid-2000s.)

Two years later, Vorobyev's athletes repeated their world-championship gold-medal performance in the all-around at the 2004 Sports Acrobatics World Championships in Lievin, France.

Vorobyev also coached the mixed pair of Michael Rodrigues and Clare Brunson at Empire AcroGymnastics. Rodrigues and Brunson won their first U.S. national mixed-pair title in 2005.

During 2006, the pair continued to train with Vorobyev when he became a coach at Mission Hills Gymnastics in Riverside. Rodrigues and Brunson captured the mixed-pair bronze medal at the 2006 World Championships in Coimbra, Portugal.

When Mission Hills Gymnastics closed in late 2006, Vorobyev and about 20 of his student’s families raised the funds to open Realis Gymnastics Academy, which offers both acrobatic and artistic gymnastics programs.

He was inducted into the USA Gymnastics Hall of Fame as a member of the class of 2024.
