= Dudchenko =

Dudchenko (Ukrainian: Дудченко) is a surname of Ukrainian origin. Notable people with the surname include:

- Alexei Dudchenko (born 1984), Russian acrobatic gymnast;
- Anton Dudchenko (born 1996), Ukrainian biathlete;
- Inga Dudchenko (born 1988), Kazakhstani rower;
- Kostyantyn Dudchenko (born 1986), Ukrainian footballer;
- Olga Dudchenko (born 1987), Kazakhstani biathlete.
