= 2008 Acrobatic Gymnastics World Championships =

21st Acrobatic Gymnastics World Championships
- Venue: Kelvin Hall
- Location: Glasgow, Scotland
- Start date: 10 October 2008
- End date: 12 October 2008
- Competitors: 39 from 7 nations

The 2008 Acrobatic Gymnastics World Championships were held in Glasgow, Scotland from 10 to 12 October 2008, at the Kelvin Hall.

== Medal table ==
* Host nation (Great Britain)

Rank	Nation	Gold	Silver	Bronze	Total
1	Russia	3	3	1	7
2	Belarus	1	0	1	2
3	Ukraine	1	0	0	1
4	Belgium	0	1	0	1
4	China	0	1	0	1
4	United States	0	1	0	1
7	Great Britain	0	0	2	2
Totals (7 entries)		5	6	4	15

== Results ==
=== Men's Group ===
Rank	Team	Country	Point
Gold medal	Denis Cherevatov, Anton Danchenko, Maxim Chulkov, Teymuraz Gurgenidze	Russia	28.751
Silver medal	Zhao Yuchao, Han Yuliang, Fang Sheng, Xue Wangxin	China	28.720
Bronze medal	Adam McAssey, Adam Buckingham, Alex Uttley, Samuel Sturt	United Kingdom	28.550
4	Artur Avakyan, Yuriy Gerasimov, Konstantin Stetsenko, Grigoriy Sergienko	Russia	28.510
5	Ilham Abbasov, Rustam Najafguliyev, Elnur Mammadov, Farid Mammadov	Azerbaijan	28.120
6	Milen Gospodinov, Velcho Stoyanov, Nikolay Ivanov, Venelin Parvanov	Bulgaria	27.850

=== Men's Pair ===
Rank	Team	Country	Point
Gold medal	Mykola Shcherbak, Serhiy Popov	Ukraine	28.622
Silver medal	Konstantin Pilipchuk, Alexei Dudchenko	Russia	28.609
Bronze medal	Mark Fyson, Edward Upcott	United Kingdom	28.503
4	Viacheslav Spirin, Stanislav Kotelnikov	Russia	28.468
5	João Maia, Tiago Figueiredo	Portugal	27.580
6	Yang Hengyi, Chen Hongen	China	27.520

=== Mixed Pair ===
Rank	Team	Country	Point
Gold medal	Olga Sviridova, Stanislav Babarykin	Russia	28.812
Silver medal	Kristin Allen, Michael Rodrigues	United States	28.801
Silver medal	Anastasia Gorbatyuk, Alexander Barleben	Russia	28.801
4	Julie van Gelder, Menno Vanderghote	Belgium	28.601
5	Alona Burlachenko, Sergei Zabiyaka	Ukraine	28.390
6	Sergei Bykhavtsov, Anastasia Zharnasek	Belarus	28.080

=== Women's Group ===
Rank	Team	Country	Point
Gold medal	Tamara Turlacheva, Irina Borzova, Tatiana Baranovskaya	Russia	28.758
Silver medal	Anastasia Chistyakova, Ekaterina Stroynova, Ekaterina Loginova	Russia	28.732
Bronze medal	Maria Girut, Tatiana Motuz, Alina Starevich	Belarus	28.400
4	Emily Grove, Casey Morrison, Victoria Lamkin	United Kingdom	28.359
5	Soen Geirnaert, Corinne van Hombeeck, Maaike Croket	Belgium	28.054
6	Olena Nepytaeva, Olga Varchuk, Anna Gorbatenko	Ukraine	28.011

=== Women's Pair ===
Rank	Team	Country	Point
Gold medal	Alina Yushko, Katsiaryna Murashko	Belarus	28.740
Silver medal	Florence Henrist, Tatjana de Vos	Belgium	28.716
Bronze medal	Raushaniya Khakimova, Alena Ploskova	Russia	28.658
4	Tatiana Alexeeva, Natalia Fedorova	Russia	28.350
5	Kristina Maraziuk, Natalia Kakhntuk	Belarus	28.154
6	Ayla Ahmadova, Dialara Sultanova	Azerbaijan	28.140
