= Irina Borzova =

Russian acrobatic gymnast

- Born: January 15, 1987 (age 39)
- Height: 170 cm (5 ft 7 in)

Gymnastics career
- Discipline: Acrobatic gymnastics
- Country represented: Russia
- Head coach: Natalia Melnikova (RUS)
- Choreographer: Lyudmila Artemyeva (RUS)
Medal record
World Championships
Gold medal – first place	2008 Glasgow	Team competition
World Cup
Bronze medal – third place	2008 Publier	Team competition

Irina Borzova (Russian: Ирина Борзова, born January 15, 1987) is a Russian acrobatic gymnast, world champion in acrobatic gymnastics (Glasgow, 2008) in the category «Women's team» (2008 Acrobatic Gymnastics World Championships; jointly with Tamara Turlacheva and Tatiana Baranovskaya). She also won bronze medal on the World Cup Series (May 23–24, 2008, Publier, France) in the category «Women's group» (jointly with Tamara Turlacheva and Tatiana Baranovskaya).
