= 2000 World Sports Acrobatics Championships =

17th World Sports Acrobatics Championships
- Location: Wrocław, Poland
- Start date: 2 November 2000
- End date: 5 November 2002 November 2000
- Competitors: 62 from 8 nations

The 2000 World Sports Acrobatics Championships were held in Wrocław, Poland from 2 to 5 November 2000.

== Medal table ==
Rank	Nation	Gold	Silver	Bronze	Total
1	Russia	11	4	0	15
2	China	4	6	1	11
3	Bulgaria	0	3	3	6
4	Belarus	0	1	3	4
5	Ukraine	0	1	2	3
6	Great Britain	0	0	4	4
7	Belgium	0	0	1	1
7	United States	0	0	1	1
Totals (8 entries)		15	15	15	45

== Men's Group ==
=== Overall ===
Rank	Team	Country	Point
Gold medal	Feng Liu, Huifeng Liu, Song Yan, Xin Hu	China	29.825
Silver medal	Alexei Gribtsov, Sergei Kholodov, Konstantin Kovalev, Pavel Pozdniakov	Russia	29.525
Bronze medal	Stilian Bojinov, Marian Hristov, Nikolay Nikolov, Anislav Varbanov	Bulgaria	28.050

=== Balance ===
Rank	Team	Country	Point
Gold medal	Feng Liu, Huifeng Liu, Song Yan, Xin Hu	China	19.850
Silver medal	Alexei Gribtsov, Sergei Kholodov, Konstantin Kovalev, Pavel Pozdniakov	Russia	19.825
Bronze medal	Stilian Bojinov, Marian Hristov, Nikolay Nikolov, Anislav Varbanov	Bulgaria	19.525
4	Evgeny Bogdanov, Alexandr Mokrousov, Alexey Shirim, Sergey Suslov	Kazakhstan	19.200
5	Volker Jaumann, Waldemar Schneider, Stefan Münzer, Jens Quitte	Germany	18.925
6	Oliver Barics, Istvan Furdan, Karoly Szever, Gabor Sziklai	Hungary	15.850

=== Tempo ===
Rank	Team	Country	Point
Gold medal	Feng Liu, Huifeng Liu, Song Yan, Xin Hu	China	29.875
Silver medal	Alexei Gribtsov, Sergei Kholodov, Konstantin Kovalev, Pavel Pozdniakov	Russia	29.725
Bronze medal	Alexei Buiniaku, Vladimir Maliutin, Dzianis Maskalenka, Ruslan Zaletski	Belarus	29.575

=== Men's Pair ===
==== Overall ====
Rank	Team	Country	Point
Gold medal	Aleksei Anikin, Sergei Batrakov	Russia	29.875
Silver medal	Anatoly Baravikov, Alexei Liubezny	Belarus	29.475
Bronze medal	Anton Ivanov, Radostin Nikolov	Bulgaria	29.400

==== Balance ====
Rank	Team	Country	Point
Gold medal	Renjie Li, Min Song	China	19.950
Silver medal	Aleksei Anikin, Sergei Batrakov	Russia	19.875
Bronze medal	Mark Flores, Martyn Smith	United Kingdom	19.825
4	Andrzej Piechota, Tomasz Wlezien	Poland	19.625
5	Anatoly Baravikov, Alexei Liubezny	Belarus	19.475
6	Anton Ivanov, Radostin Nikolov	Bulgaria	19.325

==== Tempo ====
Rank	Team	Country	Point
Gold medal	Aleksei Anikin, Sergei Batrakov	Russia	19.825
Silver medal	Anton Ivanov, Radostin Nikolov	Bulgaria	19.550
Bronze medal	Sergiy Menshykh, Pavlo Koleschnikov	Ukraine	19.525

=== Mixed Pair ===
==== Overall ====
Rank	Team	Country	Point
Gold medal	Polina Lymareva, Andrei Jakovlev	Russia	30.000
Silver medal	Kapka Todorova, Ivaylo Katzov	Bulgaria	29.525
Bronze medal	Mei Chen, Yu Wu	China	29.500

==== Balance ====
Rank	Team	Country	Point
Gold medal	Polina Lymareva, Andrei Jakovlev	Russia	20.000
Silver medal	Kapka Todorova, Ivaylo Katzov	Bulgaria	19.750
Bronze medal	Maryna Hauryliuk, Andrei Dvorak	Belarus	19.650
4	Mei Chen, Yu Wu	China	19.600
5	Aimee Broncatello, Arthur Davis	United States	19.575
6	Louise Wood Glen Wharton	United Kingdom	19.550

==== Tempo ====
Rank	Team	Country	Point
Gold medal	Polina Lymareva, Andrei Jakovlev	Russia	19.950
Silver medal	Olga Dzyba, Dmytro Klymenko	Ukraine	19.825
Bronze medal	Aimee Broncatello, Arthur Davis	United States	19.650

=== Women's Group ===
==== Overall ====
Rank	Team	Country	Point
Gold medal	Ekaterina Lysenko, Elena Arakeljan, Svetlana Kushu	Russia	29.800
Silver medal	Caidan Li, Cuiling Huang, Jiepeng Feng	China	29.725
Bronze medal	Emily Collins, Emily Crocker, Toni Cox	United Kingdom	29.700

==== Balance ====
Rank	Team	Country	Point
Gold medal	Ekaterina Lysenko, Elena Arakeljan, Svetlana Kushu	Russia	19.900
Silver medal	Caidan Li, Cuiling Huang, Jiepeng Feng	China	19.850
Bronze medal	Vistoria Arabei, Katsiaryna Katsuba, Zinaida Sazonava	Belarus	19.825
4	Emily Collins, Emily Crocker, Toni Cox	United Kingdom	19.775
5	Ganna Demidenko, Yelena Kosenko, Yelena Kosenko	Ukraine	19.750
6	Saltanat Alkeyeva, Aigul Doukenbaeva, Elena Yatsenko	Kazakhstan	19.575

==== Tempo ====
Rank	Team	Country	Point
Gold medal	Ekaterina Lysenko, Elena Arakeljan, Svetlana Kushu	Russia	19.875
Silver medal	Caidan Li, Cuiling Huang, Jiepeng Feng	China	19.800
Bronze medal	Emily Collins, Emily Crocker, Toni Cox	United Kingdom	19.700

=== Women's Pair ===
==== Overall ====
Rank	Team	Country	Point
Gold medal	Yulia Lopatkina, Anna mokhova	Russia	29.850
Silver medal	Yuehua Shi, Guangiei Sun	China	29.600
Bronze medal	Amy Clarke, Gemma Middleton	United Kingdom	29.225

==== Balance ====
Rank	Team	Country	Point
Gold medal	Yulia Lopatkina, Anna mokhova	Russia	19.875
Silver medal	Yuehua Shi, Guangiei Sun	China	19.775
Bronze medal	Lidiya Klokova, Nataliya Kovzalyuk	Ukraine	19.750
4	Amy Clarke, Gemma Middleton	United Kingdom	19.450
5	Aline Van den Weghe, Elke Van Maldegem	Belgium	19.375
6	Chantelle Blackburn, Megan Bolton	Australia	19.375

==== Tempo ====
Rank	Team	Country	Point
Gold medal	Yulia Lopatkina, Anna mokhova	Russia	19.825
Silver medal	Yuehua Shi, Guangiei Sun	China	19.675
Bronze medal	Aline Van den Weghe, Elke Van Maldegem	Belgium	19.400
