= Tamara Turlacheva =

Russian acrobatic gymnast

- Born: September 7, 1993 (age 32)
- Height: 152 cm (5 ft 0 in)

Gymnastics career
- Discipline: Acrobatic gymnastics
- Country represented: Russia
- Head coach: Natalia Melnikova (RUS)
- Choreographer: Lyudmila Artemyeva (RUS)
Medal record
World Championships
Gold medal – first place	2008 Glasgow	Team competition
World Cup
Bronze medal – third place	2008 Publier	Team competition

Tamara Turlacheva (Russian: Тамара Turlacheva, born September 7, 1993) is a Russian Acrobatic Gymnast, world champion in acrobatic gymnastics (Glasgow, 2008) in the category «Women's team» (2008 Acrobatic Gymnastics World Championships; jointly with Tatiana Baranovskaya and Irina Borzova). She also won bronze medal on the World Cup Series (May 23–24, 2008, Publier, France) in the category "Women's group" (jointly with Tatiana Baranovskaya and Irina Borzova).
