= Wang Zhen (gymnast) =

Chinese acrobatic gymnast

- Born: February 22, 1985 (age 41)

Gymnastics career
- Discipline: Acrobatic gymnastics
- Country represented: China
Medal record
World Championships
Bronze medal – third place	2006 Coimbra	Men's Group

Wang Zhen (born February 22, 1985) is a Chinese acrobatic gymnast that represented China at both the 2006 and 2004 World Championships.
