= 2012 Acrobatic Gymnastics World Championships =

23rd Acrobatic Gymnastics World Championships
- Venue: ESPN Wide World of Sports Complex HP Field House
- Location: Lake Buena Vista, Florida, United States
- Start date: April 16, 2012
- End date: April 18, 2012
- Competitors: 39 from 6 nations

The 2012 Acrobatic Gymnastics World Championships was the 23rd edition of acrobatic gymnastics competition and were held in Lake Buena Vista, Florida, United States from April 16 to April 18, 2012. It was held at the ESPN Wide World of Sports Complex HP Field House.

== Medal table ==
Rank	Nation	Gold	Silver	Bronze	Total
1	Russia	2	1	1	4
2	Great Britain	1	1	1	3
3	Belgium	1	1	0	2
4	Ukraine	1	0	1	2
5	China	1	0	0	1
6	Belarus	0	1	2	3
Totals (6 entries)		6	4	5	15

== Results ==
=== Men's pair ===
Rank	Team	Country	Point
Gold medal	Konstantin Pilipchuk, Alexei Dudchenko	Russia	28.653
Silver medal	Edward Upcott, Adam McAssey	United Kingdom	28.552
Bronze medal	Ruslan Fedchanka, Yauheni Kalachou	Belarus	27.903
4	Iaroslav Pulin, Dmytro Tarasenko	Ukraine	27.861
5	Chen Hongen, Yang Hengyi	China	27.553
6	Blagovest Karadzhov, Marti Milanov	Bulgaria	26.650

=== Women's pair ===
Rank	Team	Country	Point
Gold medal	Anastasiya Melnychenko, Kateryna Sytnikova	Ukraine	28.259
Silver medal	Yana Yanusik, Sviatlana Mikhnevich	Belarus	27.853
Bronze medal	Poppy Spalding, Alanna Baker	United Kingdom	27.800
4	Valentina Kim, Elizaveta Dubrovina	Russia	27.510
5	Beth Landeche, Nicole Barrilleaux	United States	26.956
6	Aleksandra Bialas, Katarzyna Chlebisz	Poland	26.330

=== Mixed pair ===
Rank	Team	Country	Point
Gold medal	Nicolas Vleeshouwers, Laure De Pryck	Belgium	28.520
Silver medal	Tatiana Okulova, Revaz Gurgenidze	Russia	28.453
Bronze medal	Inna Batuyeva, Denys Iasynskyi	Ukraine	28.308
4	Shen Yunyun, Liu Qi	China	28.158
5	Vitaliy Kovalenko, Karina Shokubayeva	Kazakhstan	27.890
6	Gonçalo Roque, Sofia Rolão	Portugal	27.520
7	Christopher McGreevy, Emily McCarthy	United Kingdom	27.440
8	Kelianne Stankus, Dylan Maurer	United States	25.990

=== Men's group ===
Rank	Team	Country	Point
Gold medal	Dorian Walker, Jesse Heskett, Matthew Evison, Richard Hurst	United Kingdom	28.050
Gold medal	Tang Jian, Wang Lei, Zhou Yi, Wu Yeqiuyin	China	28.050
Bronze medal	Valentin Chetverkin, Maksim Chulkov, Anton Danchenko, Dmitry Bryzgalov	Russia	27.704
4	Yuriy Skits, Daniil Biriukov, Roman Onysko, Dmytro Osin	Ukraine	27.410
5	Tom Boons, Sebastian Boucquey, Arne Van Gelder, Kevin De Meyer	Belgium	27.370
6	Kiryl Zhdanovich, Eduard Vauchetski, Kiryl Shatau, Artsiom Khvalko	Belarus	26.970

=== Women's group ===
Rank	Team	Country	Point
Gold medal	Aigul Shaikhutdinova, Ekaterina Stroynova, Ekaterina Loginova	Russia	28.653
Silver medal	Sanne van Overberghe, Lara Schollier, Camille van Betsbrugge	Belgium	28.054
Bronze medal	Yuliya Khrypach, Hanna Kobyzeva, Julia Kovalenko	Belarus	27.601
4	Kinga Beker, Kinga Grzeskow, Kamila Kowalska	Poland	27.153
5	Annelise Olsson, Ingrid Dunkerley, Melanie Byrne	Australia	26.950
6	Ana Catarina Pereira, Leonor Piqueiro, Daniela Leal	Portugal	26.910
7	Sienna Colbert, Holli Morris, Crystal Johnston	United States	26.890
8	Liliana Walduck, Casey Morrison, Amber Campbell-White	United Kingdom	26.104

== Medal table ==
Rank	Nation	Gold	Silver	Bronze	Total
1	Russia (RUS)	2	1	1	4
2	Great Britain (GBR)	1	1	1	3
3	Belgium (BEL)	1	1	0	2
4	Ukraine (UKR)	1	0	1	2
5	China (CHN)	1	0	0	1
6	Belarus (BLR)	0	1	2	3
Totals (6 entries)		6	4	5	15
