= Yanna Cholaeva =

Russian acrobatic gymnast

- Born: August 8, 1985 (age 41)

Gymnastics career
- Discipline: Acrobatic gymnastics
- Country represented: Russia
Medal record
World Championships
Silver medal – second place	2004 Lievin	Women's Pair
Silver medal – second place	2006 Coimbra	Women's Pair

Yanna Cholaeva (born August 8, 1985) is a Russian female acrobatic gymnast. Along with Anna Melnikova, she has come second in the Women's Pair event at the world championships in both 2004 and 2006.
