= Shenea Booth =

American acrobatic gymnast

- Born: August 21, 1986 (age 40) San Jose
- Height: 5 ft (152 cm)

Gymnastics career
- Discipline: Acrobatic gymnastics
- Country represented: United States
- Gym: Empire Acrogymnastics
- Head coach: Youri Vorobyev
- Retired: 2004
Medal record
World Championships
Gold medal – first place	2002 Riesa	Mixed pair
Gold medal – first place	2004 Lievin	Mixed pair
World Games
Silver medal – second place	2001 Akita	Mixed pair

Shenea Booth (born August 21, 1986) is an American acrobatic gymnast who represented the United States of America at the 2001 World Games, the 2002 World Championships and the 2004 World Championships in the Mixed Pair event, along with her partner, Arthur Davis.

== Career ==
At the conclusion of their competitive careers, Booth and Davis formed the acrobatic gymnastics act Realis, which made it to the final round of competition in the 2006 season of the U.S. reality TV show, America's Got Talent.

During their career as Duo Realis they received offers to appear in Cirque Du Soleil's : Amma Luna, La Nouba, Banana Shpeel, Mystere, and Kooza.

Duo Realis was chosen by Cirque Du Soleil to represent Guy Laliberte at the famed World Entrepreneurship Awards in Monaco.

Booth and Davis were both chosen for induction into the USA Gymnastics Hall of Fame in 2009. They were also inducted into the World Acrobatic Society Hall of Fame which honored their combined competitive and performance careers spanning over 20 years to the present.

The pair won the all-around at the U.S. National Sports Acrobatic Championships in 2002, 2003 and 2004. During their career, Booth and Davis also won national awards for performance, skill difficulty and choreography.)

Prior to her partnership with Davis, Booth was the top in a mixed pair with acrobatic gymnast Julian Amaro (now retired). Booth and Amaro won the all-around title at the 2001 U.S. Sports Acrobatic National Championships in Dayton, OH.

Booth and Amaro were also the first American acrobats to win a medal at the World Games in 2001 in Akita, Japan. This being the Olympics for all non Olympic sports. An American team had never achieved this standing winning the silver medal .

In 1999, the women's trio of Shenea Booth, Maria Navarro and Nicole Booth won the national women's trio title at the 1998, and 1999 Sports Acrobatic National Championships in Phoenix, Arizona. They also had a successful win at the 2000 National Championships.

In 2000, Booth, Booth, and Michelle Meier represented the United States at the World Championships in Warsaw, Poland.

In 2012 Shenea was the Silver Medalist of the 8th Annual Izhevsk Circus Festival as Duo Maintenant. She also had the honor to perform at the CeBit; with German Prime Minister Angela Merkel & Brazil's President Dilma Rousseff as honorary guests in attendance.

Her Duo Maintenant performance on YouTube has received over 10 million views.

As a highlight to her career as Duo Maintenant, Shenea had the opportunity to perform at the Wedding of the High Commissioner for the Sochi Olympic Games.

In 2015, Shenea had the enormous pleasure of becoming the first ever African – American female soloist to play a lead character in a Cirque Du Soleil production, by performing as " The Promise" in the classic spectacle Varekai.

During 2015, Shenea was also offered starring roles in Cirque Du Soleil's :

Zumanity(Las Vegas), Amma Luna(Tour), and Quidam(Tour)!

Shenea Booth currently performs worldwide and has appeared in The Palazzo Amsterdam, Palazzo Saarbrucken, The Wintergarten Funky Town (Berlin) & All Night Long, The Royal Carre with Hans Klock, Circus Knie in " Ohlala ", Beat the Best(Dutch)(finalist), Germany's Got Talent(finalist), America's Got Talent(finalist), So You Think You Can Dance, Dancing with the Stars, Cascabel featuring Top Chef Rick Bayless, and Circus Roncalli Variete.

As a coach and choreographer Shenea got an opportunity to work with Olympic Champions Chinese Figure Skaters Shen and Zhao, and U.S Ice Dance Olympic team members Madison Chock and Evan Bates.

Television:

2003 Tylenol Pre – Olympic Tour

2004 TJ Maxx Gymnastics Olympic Tour(NBC)

2005 Hilton Ice Skating and Gymnastics Spectacular (NBC)(Bravo)(StyleChannel)

2006 Tylenol Skating and Gymnastics Spectacular(NBC)Bravo)

2007&2010 Tylenol Skating and Gymnastics Spectacular(NBC)(Bravo)

2007 " El Gong " Show in Spain

The "Today" Show special appearance (3x)

Finalist on America's Got Talent Season One

2008 " Dancing with the Stars " Special Performance with Diavolo

2008 " So You Think You Can Dance Australia " 2008 Argentinean spinoff of America's Got Talent (Special Guest Performance)

2008 The Deaf Olympics Promotional Appearance for Cirque Du Soleil

2011 Chevy Commercial Featuring the cast of GLEE Principal Role

2012 Germany's Got Talent

2012 Beat the Best (Dutch Version)

2013 GMC Capable Commercial Principal Role

Cirque Du Soleil Special Events(7 years to current)

Cirque Dreams Productions

Le Noir Cirque Singapore

Cirque Mechanics

Circus Roncalli's Apollo Theater " London Calling "

IPL Cricket League Closing Ceremonies( Mumbai, India)

NBA Half-time Shows Special Performances

Cirque Du Soleil's Microsoft Event presentation of Natal

Formula One Gala(Monaco)

Le Ombre'

The Box Exclusive Nightclub Manhattan

The San Diego Zoo( 2 years)

Sea World San Diego Cirque De La Mer Acrobatic Show

Royal Caribbean Cruise Line Specialty Performer

NY Mercantile Exchange Event with the " Guess Who "

WeSpark Cancer Benefit

Hollywood Cirquewood Benefit

Novicento Runway Event

Dream Foundation : Valentino Runway Show

Beijing Olympics Trade-Show Event Sponsored by Panasonic

World Entrepreneurship Awards(Monaco)

(2 years) Hyundai Capital Gymnastics and Acrobatics Event (Seoul, Korea)

Equality California Charity Event

Imagination Entertainment Specialty Performances/ Corporate Events

" Best Buddies " Charitable Performance hosted by the Shriver Family

Human Rights Campaign Corporate Event

Cinespace in Hollywood New Years Event StreetCirque

Visa Championships Performance(Gymnastics)

Santa Monica Pier 100th Centennial Celebration

Von Dutch Private Events

Arnold Schwarzenegger Body Building Classic

Daniel Pearl World Peace Event(3yrs)

All Star Opening Ceremonies

Quixotic Special Events

Resort World Casino

Oakland Fire Arts Festival presents the " Crucible "

" Cascabel " at the LookingGlass Theater in Chicago Featuring Top Chef Rick Bayless

Model/Print Shenea has had the opportunity to model for many photographers throughout the world as a result of her performances worldwide. She has had the pleasure of working with photographer Nigel Skeet(noted for his Rollingstone publications) over the past three years. She has been used for advertisement by Cirque Du Soleil, as well as America's Got Talent. Her photos have been published in several sports magazines, Technique Magazine, USA Gymnastics Magazine, newspapers nationally, as well as internationally.

2009/10' Cycle- Kia Ad as " Sock Monkey "
