= Rob Laurie =

American ice hockey player

- Born: May 19, 1970 (age 56) East Lansing, MI, USA
- Height: 5 ft 10 in (178 cm)
- Weight: 170 lb (77 kg; 12 st 2 lb)
- Position: Goaltender
- Caught: Left
- Played for: Adirondack Red Wings; Austin Ice Bats; Dayton Bombers; El Paso Buzzards; Flint Generals; Fort Worth Brahmas; Greensboro Monarchs; Huntington Blizzard; Johnstown Chiefs; Roanoke Valley Rebels; Tallahassee Tiger Sharks
- NHL draft: Undrafted
- Playing career: 1992–2002

Rob Laurie (born May 19, 1970) is an American former professional ice hockey goaltender who played eleven years of minor league hockey mostly in the East Coast Hockey League. More than a decade after his "retirement", Laurie has been dressed three times as an emergency NHL backup goaltender; first in the 2012–13 season for the Anaheim Ducks, and then during the 2013–14 season for both the Vancouver Canucks and Minnesota Wild.

== Career ==
After a four-year career at Western Michigan University, Laurie joined the Roanoke Valley Rampage of the East Coast Hockey League in 1992. Laurie spent the majority of his career (1992–97) in the ECHL, with stops in Roanoke Valley, Dayton, Johnstown, Greensboro, Toledo, Tallahassee, and Huntington. Laurie finished his career splitting time between the WPHL, UHL, and Central Hockey League, all with teams based in Texas. After a season with the El Paso Buzzards in which Laurie compiled an 11-8-0 record in 22 games, Laurie retired at the completion of the 2001-02 CHL season.

=== National Hockey League ===
On April 5, 2013, with goaltenders Jonas Hiller out of the lineup due to an illness, the Anaheim Ducks recalled Igor Bobkov from their AHL affiliate in Norfolk. However, with Bobkov's flight running late and the Ducks still needing a backup goaltender, the Ducks signed 42 year old Laurie to a one-day professional tryout contract. Laurie ended up dressing as the backup goalie for the first 3:53 and was eventually replaced by Bobkov as the team's backup goaltender. During his brief appearance with the Ducks, Laurie wore jersey number 43.

On January 5, 2014, Laurie was once again called to emergency goaltender duty. This time by the Vancouver Canucks in their road game against the Anaheim Ducks, serving as a backup to Eddie Lack.

On March 31, 2014, following an injury to Darcy Kuemper during morning skate, Laurie was signed by the Minnesota Wild to a professional tryout contract and dressed for their game against the Los Angeles Kings as backup to Ilya Bryzgalov.

Laurie was paid US$500 for each of the three games for which he dressed.

== Inline hockey ==
Laurie was the starting goaltender for the Anaheim Bullfrogs on July 2, 1993 in the first professional sporting event played in the now-Honda Center. The Bullfrogs were a professional inline hockey team that played their home games in the former Arrowhead Pond of Anaheim from 1993 until 1997. During that season, Laurie led the Bullfrogs to the Roller Hockey International league championship and was later named playoff MVP.
