= Mykola Shcherbak =

Ukrainian acrobatic gymnast

- Born: 19 July 1987 (age 39) Kiev, Ukrainian SSR, Soviet Union (now - Kyiv, Ukraine)

Gymnastics career
- Discipline: Acrobatic gymnastics
- Country represented: Ukraine (2001–2009 (UKR))
- Club: Central Sports Club of the Armed Forces
Medal record
Men's acrobatic gymnastics
Representing Ukraine
World Games
Gold medal – first place	2009 Kaohsiung	Pair all-around
Silver medal – second place	2005 Duisburg	Pair all-around
World Championships
Gold medal – first place	2006 Coimbra	Pair all-around
Gold medal – first place	2008 Glasgow	Pair all-around
Bronze medal – third place	2004 Liévin	Pair all-around
European Championships
Gold medal – first place	2005 Thessaloniki	Pair all-around
Gold medal – first place	2007 Den Bosch	Pair all-around
Bronze medal – third place	2003 Zielona Góra	Pair all-around

Mykola Shcherbak (Ukrainian: Микола Щербак; born 17 July 1987 in Kyiv), known as Mikola Cherbak, is a Ukrainian male acrobatic gymnast, who competed in pairs with Serhiy Popov.

== Career ==
In 2000, Mykola Shcherbak became the Honored Master of Sport in acrobatic gymnastics.

Since 2001, Shcherbak joined to the Ukrainian national team.

Mykola with Serhiy Popov debuted competing at the 2003 Acrobatic Gymnastics European Championships, held in Zielona Góra, in the pair all-around event, winning a bronze medal.

The following year, the duo competed at the World Championships in Liévin, winning bronze medals in the pair all-around event.

In 2005, the acrobatic duo Shcherbak/Popov won a silver medal in the pair all-around event at the World Games in Duisburg. Later, Shcherbak/Popov won gold medals in pair all-around event at the European Championships in Thessaloniki.

At the 2006 Acrobatic Gymnastics World Championships, held in Coimbra, the duo became world champions in pair all-around.

The following year, the duo became twice European champions in pair all-around event at the 2007 Acrobatic Gymnastics European Championships, held in Den Bosch.

At the following World Championships, held in Glasgow in 2008, Shcherbak/Popov became twice world champions in pair all-around event.

The following year, the duo became World Games gold all-around medalists. After World Games the duo finished their sport career.

== Professional career ==
Shcherbak and Popov made their performing debut at the Krystallpalast Varieté in Leipzig, Germany, in 2010, and have been featured since at Teatro Circo Price in Madrid, at the Palazzo in Mannheim, Germany, at the legendary Moulin-Rouge in Paris, at Circus Carré in Amsterdam, among other prestigious venues. They made their American debut in 2015 at Circus Sarasota, in Sarasota, Florida.

In 2010, the duo competed at the TV-show Ukraine's Got Talent, reaching a final. The following year, Shcherbak and Popov competed at the Festival Mondial du Cirque de Demain in Paris, winning gold medal. In 2012, they finished 1st at the 5th World Circus Festival in Moscow.

In 2013, the duo made its debut at the International Circus Festival of Monte-Carlo, winning the most prestigious circus award - Golden Clown.

In 2014, Shcherbak/Popov competed at the German Das Supertalent.

In 2021, the duo Shcherbak/Popov was inducted into World Acrobatic Society Hall of Fame.
