= Anna Melnikova =

Russian acrobatic gymnast

- Born: July 20, 1985 (age 41)

Gymnastics career
- Discipline: Acrobatic gymnastics
- Country represented: Russia
Medal record
World Championships
| Silver medal – second place | 2004 Lievin | Women's Pair |
| Silver medal – second place | 2006 Coimbra | Women's Pair |

Anna Melnikova (born July 20, 1985) is a Russian female acrobatic gymnast. Along with Yanna Cholaeva, she has come second in the Women's Pair event at the world championships in both 2005 and 2006.
