= Revaz Gurgenidze =

Russian acrobatic gymnast

- Born: 9 July 1986 (age 40)

Gymnastics career
- Discipline: Acrobatic gymnastics
- Country represented: Russia
Medal record
Acrobatic gymnastics
Representing Russia
World Games
Gold medal – first place	2005 Duisburg	Mixed Pair
World Championships
Silver medal – second place	2004 Lievin	Mixed Pair
Gold medal – first place	2006 Coimbra	Mixed Pair
Silver medal – second place	2010 Wrocław	Mixed Pair
Silver medal – second place	2012 Lake Buena Vista	Mixed Pair
Gold medal – first place	2014 Levallois-Perret	Mixed Pair

Revaz Gurgenidze (born 9 July 1986) is a Russian male acrobatic gymnast. With his partner Anna Katchalova, he achieved silver in the 2004 World Sports Acrobatics Championships and gold in the 2006 Acrobatic Gymnastics World Championships. With his partner Tatiana Okulova, he achieved silver in the 2010 Acrobatic Gymnastics World Championships and 2012 Acrobatic Gymnastics World Championships. He and his partner, Marina Chernova, achieved gold in the 2014 Acrobatic Gymnastics World Championships.

With Anna Katchalova, Gurgenidze won the 2005 World Games gold medal. Eight years later Gurgenidze and Chernova missed bronze by half a point and finished fourth.

Following his athletic career, Gurgenidze began coaching alongside his father and brother.
