= Andrii Bondarenko =

Balance expert

- Born: Andrii Bondarenko; March 1, 1986 (age 39); Nikolaev, Ukraine, Soviet Union
- Citizenship: Ukraine
- Occupations: Acrobat; Balance expert
- Years active: 2003-present
- Height: 1.6 m (5 ft 3 in)

Andrii Bondarenko is a Ukrainian acrobat and a balance expert: he is known a solo hand balancer. In 2003 he was selected to be on the National team of Sport Acro in Ukraine. He has worked with Cirque du Soleil since 2014. He is a two time Gold Medal winner at the Acrobatics World Championships.

== Career ==
Bondarenko began his career in balancing and acrobatics in 2003 when he was selected to be on the National team of Acro dance in Ukraine. He competed and won several world championships awards for his work in Acrobatics. Bondarenko competed as a member of Ukraine's National Team and he won Silver in 2004 and Gold in 2005 and 2006 at the Acrobatics World Championships.

In 2012 the Andrii and Oleksandr Bondarenko began traveling the world with a Cirque company. Andrii is known as a flyer in Cirqu du Soleil's production. In the show Bondarenko performed a hand-balancing act called "Upside Down World". Bondarenko would build a chair tower and perform feats of balance and strength while precariously balanced upside down on the chairs. He has worked with Cirque du Soleil as one of their best balance performers. Since 2014 he has also assisted with their stage productions.

== Early life ==
Bondarenko grew up in the small town of Nikolaev, Ukraine. He and his brother Oleksandr began performing a sport called Adagio (acrobatics) when they were ten years old. The two brothers lifted weights and practiced balancing.

== Acrobatics Awards ==
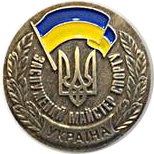
Merited Master of Sports

- Silver at the World Championships in France (2004)
- Gold at the World Cup, Belgium (2005)
- Gold at the VII World Games for non-Olympic sports (2005), Germany
- Bronze at the X International Circus Festival City of Latina performing as part of the "Men in Black" troupe, Italy (2008)
- Silver at the VIII Moscow International Youth Festival-Contest in the Circus Arts Russia (2009)
- Merited Master of Sports (the highest distinction in the sport in Ukraine)
- Presidential Order of Merit

== See also ==
- Acrobalance
- List of acrobatic activities
- Adagio (acrobatics)
