= Arthur Davis (gymnast) =

American acrobatic gymnast

- Born: December 29, 1974 (age 51)

Gymnastics career
- Discipline: Acrobatic gymnastics
- Country represented: United States
- Gym: Empire Acrogymnastics
- Head coach: Youri Vorobyev
- Retired: 2004
Medal record
World Championships
Bronze medal – third place	2000 Wrocław	Dynamic
Gold medal – first place	2002 Riesa	All-Around
Gold medal – first place	2004 Liévin	All-Around

Arthur Davis (born December 29, 1974) is an American retired acrobatic gymnast who won two world championship titles while completing as the base in a mixed pair with top Shenea Booth (also retired from athletic competition).

Davis and Booth were the first American athletes to win the mixed-pair all-around gold medal at the 2002 Sports Acrobatics World Championships in Riesa, Germany. (The sport now known as acrobatic gymnastics was called sports acrobatics until the mid-2000s (decade).)

The pair tied for the gold medal in the 2002 World Championships with the Russian mixed pair of Yuri Trubitsin and Elena Kirjanova. Also in 2002, the pair placed second all-around at the 2002 Machuga Cup in Krasnodar, Russia.

Davis and Booth placed second in the all-around, balance and tempo at the 2003 Volkov Cup in Veliki Novgorod, Russia.

The pair won the all-around at the U.S. National Sports Acrobatic Championships in 2002, 2003 and 2004. Davis and Booth also won national awards for performance, skill difficulty and choreography.

Davis and Booth repeated their world-championship gold-medal performance in the all-around at the 2004 Sports Acrobatics World Championships in Lievin, France.

After their retirement, Booth and Davis formed the acrobatic gymnastics duo Realis, which made it to the final round of competition in the 2006 season of the U.S. reality TV show, America’s Got Talent.

Prior to working with Booth, Davis was the base in a mixed pair with top Aimee Broncatello (now retired). The pair placed first all-around at the 2000 National Championships in Jacksonville, Florida.

Davis and Broncatello placed third in dynamic and fifth all-around at the 2000 World Championships in Wrocław, Poland, and they placed ninth all-around at the 1999 World Championships in Ghent, Belgium.

In 1996, Davis also won the mixed pairs all-around title with Natalie Baeza at the 1996 National Championships in Palm Springs, California.
