= 2014 Winter Olympics torch relay =

- Host city: Sochi, Russia
- Countries visited: Greece, Russia
- Distance: 65,000 km
- Torchbearers: ~15,000
- Start date: 7 October 2013
- End date: 7 February 2014

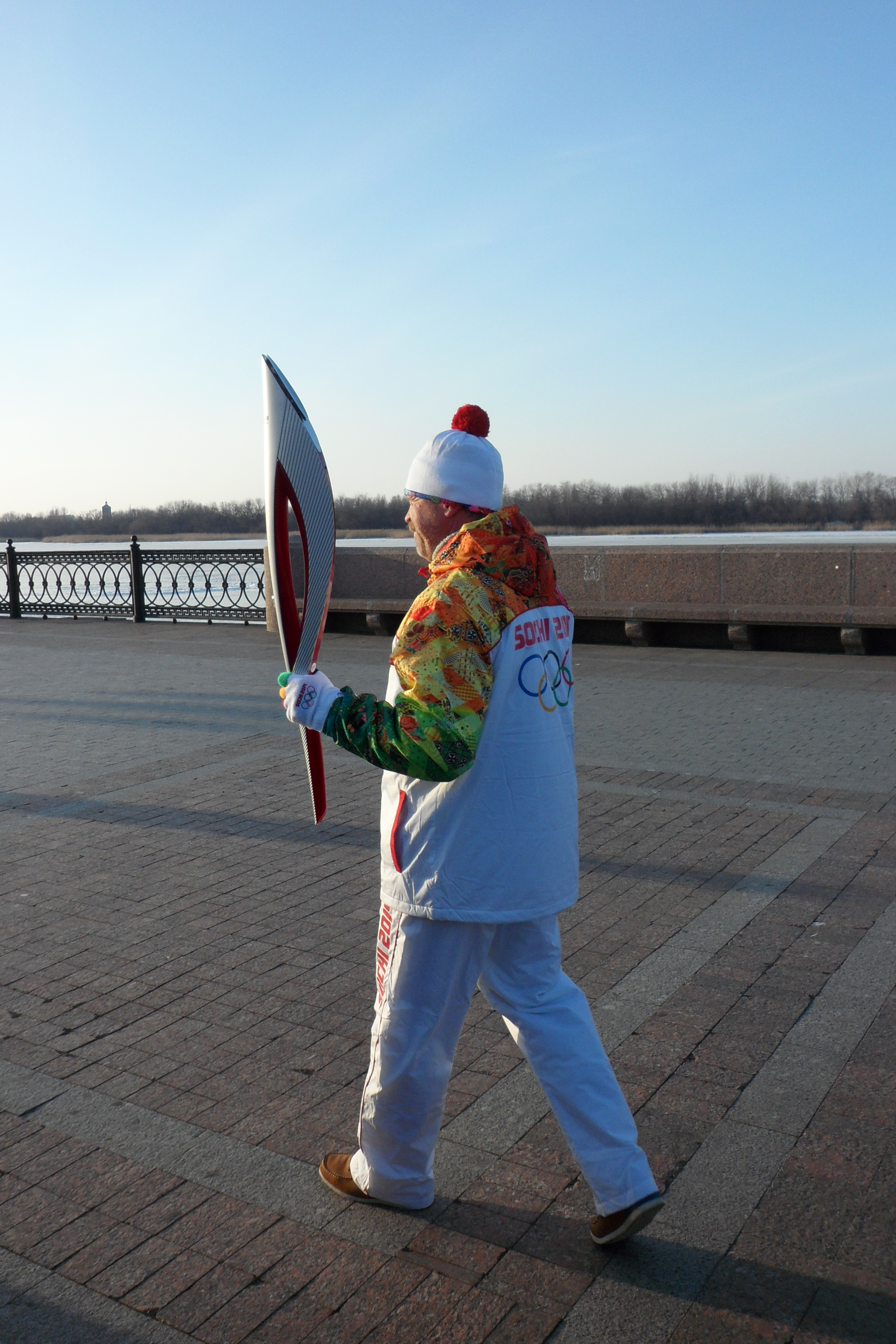
Torchbearer in Astrakhan

The 2014 Winter Olympics torch relay was run from October 7, 2013, 123 days prior to the Sochi 2014 Winter Olympics, until February 7, 2014, the day of the opening ceremony at Sochi. In Russia the relay traveled from Moscow to Sochi through 2,900 towns and villages across all 83 federal subjects of Russia by foot, car, train, plane, and troika for over 65,000 km of journey. The event became the longest relay in Winter Olympics history.

The lighting ceremony was held on September 29, 2013, at Olympia, Greece with Greek alpine skier Ioannis Antoniou as the relay originating torchbearer. The first Russian torchbearer was NHL star Alex Ovechkin, who received the torch from Antoniou in Olympia.

== The Torches ==
The 2014 Olympic Torches were unveiled on January 14, 2013, in Moscow. The torch is chrome with red detail, a traditional colour of Russian sport. It was designed by a creative team led by Vladimir Pirozhkov and Andrei Vodyanik and weighs nearly 1.8 kg (4.0 lb), is 0.95 m (37 in) tall, 0.145 m (5.7 in) wide, and 0.54 m (21 in) deep.

The torches failed on at least forty-four occasions during the relay, a failure rate of about 3 percent compared to the average 5 percent at the previous Olympics, and on one occasion, a nearby guard helped light the fire again with a lighter. The People's Front (a movement created and led by Vladimir Putin) has called for a criminal investigation into the manufacturer of the torches, a rocket/missile factory.

== Special relay ==
Torch relay in space

On October 20, 2013, the torches reached the North Pole for the first time via the nuclear-powered icebreaker 50 Let Pobedy. On November 6, 2013, the torch was flown into space by Soyuz rocket and brought back on November 11. The torch reached Europe's highest mountain, Mount Elbrus, and the depths of Siberia's Lake Baikal.

== Route in Greece ==
September 29 (day 1)

- Olympia, Amaliada, Elis, Pyrgos, Zacharo, Kalo Nero, Tripoli, Levidi, Lefkasi, Kalavryta

September 30 (day 2)

- Patras, Rio, Missolonghi, Agrinio, Karpenisi

October 1 (day 3)

- Lamia, Volos, Larissa, Katerini

October 2 (day 4)

- Thessaloniki, Giannitsa, Naousa, Edessa, Florina, Kastoria

October 3 (day 5)

- Grevena, Ioannina, Kalabaka, Trikala

October 4 (day 6)

- Karditsa, Lamia, Amfissa, Delphi, Arachova, Livadeia, Athens

== Route in Russia ==
Map of all places visited by the torch relay

| Route | Map |
|---|---|
| October 7–9 (day 1–3): Moscow; October 10 (day 4): Kolomna; October 10 (day 4): Odintsovo; October 10 (day 4): Arkhangelskoye; October 10 (day 4): Krasnogorsk; October 10 (day 4): Dmitrov | 2014 Winter Olympics torch relay is located in Moscow Oblast |
| October 11 (day 5): Torzhok; October 11 (day 5): Tver; October 12 (day 6): Rzhev | 2014 Winter Olympics torch relay is located in Tver Oblast |
| October 12 (day 6): Smolensk | 2014 Winter Olympics torch relay is located in Smolensk Oblast |
| October 13 (day 7): Yukhnov; October 13 (day 7): Kaluga | 2014 Winter Olympics torch relay is located in Kaluga Oblast |
| October 14 (day 8): Yasnaya Polyana; October 14 (day 8): Novomoskovsk; October 14 (day 8): Tula | 2014 Winter Olympics torch relay is located in Tula Oblast |
| October 15 (day 9): Ryazan | 2014 Winter Olympics torch relay is located in Ryazan Oblast |
| October 16 (day 10): Murom; October 16 (day 10): Vladimir; October 17 (day 11): Suzdal | 2014 Winter Olympics torch relay is located in Vladimir Oblast |
| October 17 (day 11): Ivanovo; October 18 (day 12): Plyos | 2014 Winter Olympics torch relay is located in Ivanovo Oblast |
| October 18 (day 12): Kostroma | 2014 Winter Olympics torch relay is located in Kostroma Oblast |
| October 19 (day 13): Yaroslavl | 2014 Winter Olympics torch relay is located in Yaroslavl Oblast |
| October 20 (day 14): Vologda | 2014 Winter Olympics torch relay is located in Vologda Oblast |
October 21 (day 15): Not travelling, staying in Vologda
| October 22 (day 16): Kizhi; October 22 (day 16): Petrozavodsk; October 23 (day 17): Pryazha; October 23 (day 17): Olonets | 2014 Winter Olympics torch relay is located in Karelia |
| October 24 (day 18): Veliky Novgorod | 2014 Winter Olympics torch relay is located in Novgorod Oblast |
| October 25 (day 19): Izborsk; October 25 (day 19): Pskov | 2014 Winter Olympics torch relay is located in Pskov Oblast |
| October 26 (day 20): Gatchina | 2014 Winter Olympics torch relay is located in Leningrad Oblast |
| October 27 (day 21): Saint Petersburg; October 28 (day 22): Kronstadt; October 28 (day 22): Lomonosov; October 28 (day 22): Petergof; October 28 (day 22): Pushkin | 2014 Winter Olympics torch relay is located in Saint Petersburg |
| October 29 (day 23): Svetlogorsk; October 29 (day 23): Kaliningrad | 2014 Winter Olympics torch relay is located in Kaliningrad Oblast |
| October 30 (day 24): Murmansk | 2014 Winter Olympics torch relay is located in Murmansk Oblast |
October 31 (day 25): Not travelling, staying in Murmansk
| November 1 (day 26): Severodvinsk; November 1 (day 26): Arkhangelsk | 2014 Winter Olympics torch relay is located in Arkhangelsk Oblast |
| November 2 (day 27): Syktyvkar | 2014 Winter Olympics torch relay is located in Komi Republic |
| November 3 (day 28): Naryan-Mar | 2014 Winter Olympics torch relay is located in Nenets Autonomous Okrug |
| November 4 (day 29): Novy Urengoy; November 4 (day 29): Salekhard | 2014 Winter Olympics torch relay is located in Yamalo-Nenets Autonomous Okrug |
| November 5 (day 30): Nefteyugansk; November 6 (day 31): Khanty-Mansiysk | 2014 Winter Olympics torch relay is located in Khanty–Mansi Autonomous Okrug |
| November 7 (day 32): Norilsk | 2014 Winter Olympics torch relay is located in Krasnoyarsk Krai |
| November 8 (day 33): Mirny; November 9 (day 34): Yakutsk | 2014 Winter Olympics torch relay is located in Sakha Republic |
| November 10 (day 35): Magadan | 2014 Winter Olympics torch relay is located in Magadan Oblast |
November 11 (day 36): Not travelling, staying in Magadan
| November 12 (day 37): Anadyr | 2014 Winter Olympics torch relay is located in Chukotka Autonomous Okrug |
| November 12 (day 37):Yelizovo; November 13 (day 38):Petropavlovsk-Kamchatsky | 2014 Winter Olympics torch relay is located in Kamchatka Krai |
| November 14 (day 39): Yuzhno-Sakhalinsk | 2014 Winter Olympics torch relay is located in Sakhalin Oblast |
| November 15–16 (day 40–41): Vladivostok | 2014 Winter Olympics torch relay is located in Primorsky Krai |
| November 17 (day 42): Khabarovsk | 2014 Winter Olympics torch relay is located in Khabarovsk Krai |
| November 18 (day 43): Birobidzhan | 2014 Winter Olympics torch relay is located in Jewish Autonomous Oblast |
| November 19 (day 44): Belogorsk; November 19 (day 44): Blagoveshchensk | 2014 Winter Olympics torch relay is located in Amur Oblast |
November 20 (day 45): Not travelling, staying in Blagoveshchensk
| November 21 (day 46): Chita | 2014 Winter Olympics torch relay is located in Zabaykalsky Krai |
| November 22 (day 47): Ulan-Ude | 2014 Winter Olympics torch relay is located in Republic of Buryatia |
| November 23 (day 48): Listvyanka (Lake Baikal); November 24 (day 49): Irkutsk | 2014 Winter Olympics torch relay is located in Irkutsk Oblast |
| November 25 (day 50): Divnogorsk; November 26 (day 51): Krasnoyarsk | 2014 Winter Olympics torch relay is located in Krasnoyarsk Krai |
| November 27 (day 52): Abakan | 2014 Winter Olympics torch relay is located in Khakassia |
| November 28 (day 53): Kyzyl | 2014 Winter Olympics torch relay is located in Tuva Republic |
| November 29 (day 54): Kedrovskiy coal mine November 30 (day 55): Kemerovo | 2014 Winter Olympics torch relay is located in Kemerovo Oblast |
| December 1 (day 56): Tomsk | 2014 Winter Olympics torch relay is located in Tomsk Oblast |
| December 2 (day 57): Gorno-Altaysk | 2014 Winter Olympics torch relay is located in Altai Republic |
| December 3 (day 58): Barnaul | 2014 Winter Olympics torch relay is located in Altai Krai |
December 4–5 (day 59–60): Not travelling, staying in Barnaul
| December 6–7 (day 61–62): Novosibirsk; December 8 (day 63): Kuybyshev; December 8 (day 63): Barabinsk | 2014 Winter Olympics torch relay is located in Novosibirsk Oblast |
| December 8 (day 63): Kalachinsk; December 9 (day 64): Omsk | 2014 Winter Olympics torch relay is located in Omsk Oblast |
December 10 (day 65): Not travelling, staying in Omsk
| December 11 (day 66): Tyumen; December 12 (day 67): Tobolsk | 2014 Winter Olympics torch relay is located in Tyumen Oblast |
| December 13–14 (day 68–69): Yekaterinburg; December 13 (day 68): Nizhny Tagil; December 15 (day 70): Kamensk-Uralsky | 2014 Winter Olympics torch relay is located in Sverdlovsk Oblast |
| December 15 (day 70): Kurgan; December 16 (day 71): Shadrinsk | 2014 Winter Olympics torch relay is located in Kurgan Oblast |
| December 16–17 (day 71–72): Chelyabinsk; December 18 (day 73): Magnitogorsk | 2014 Winter Olympics torch relay is located in Chelyabinsk Oblast |
December 19 (day 74): Not travelling, staying in Magnitogorsk
| December 20–21 (day 75–76): Ufa | 2014 Winter Olympics torch relay is located in Bashkortostan |
| December 22 (day 77): Orenburg | 2014 Winter Olympics torch relay is located in Orenburg Oblast |
December 23 (day 78): Not travelling, staying in Orenburg
| December 24 (day 79): Syzran; December 24 (day 79): Tolyatti; December 25 (day 80): Samara | 2014 Winter Olympics torch relay is located in Samara Oblast |
| December 26 (day 81): Ulyanovsk | 2014 Winter Olympics torch relay is located in Ulyanovsk Oblast |
| December 27 (day 82): Cheboksary | 2014 Winter Olympics torch relay is located in Chuvash Republic |
| December 28 (day 83): Yoshkar-Ola | 2014 Winter Olympics torch relay is located in Mari El |
December 29 (day 84): Not travelling, staying in Yoshkar-Ola
| December 30 (day 85): Sviyazhsk; December 30–31 (day 85–86): Kazan | 2014 Winter Olympics torch relay is located in Tatarstan |
January 1 (day 87): Not travelling, staying in Kazan
| January 2 (day 88): Izhevsk | 2014 Winter Olympics torch relay is located in Udmurt Republic |
| January 3 (day 89): Kungur; January 3–4 (day 89–90): Perm | 2014 Winter Olympics torch relay is located in Perm Krai |
| January 5 (day 91): Kirov | 2014 Winter Olympics torch relay is located in Kirov Oblast |
January 6 (day 92): Not travelling, staying in Kirov
| January 7–8 (day 93–94): Nizhny Novgorod | 2014 Winter Olympics torch relay is located in Nizhny Novgorod Oblast |
| January 9 (day 95): Saransk | 2014 Winter Olympics torch relay is located in Republic of Mordovia |
| January 10 (day 96): Penza | 2014 Winter Olympics torch relay is located in Penza Oblast |
| January 11 (day 97): Saratov | 2014 Winter Olympics torch relay is located in Saratov Oblast |
| January 12 (day 98): Tambov; January 13 (day 99): Michurinsk | 2014 Winter Olympics torch relay is located in Tambov Oblast |
| January 13 (day 99): Lipetsk; January 14 (day 100): Yelets | 2014 Winter Olympics torch relay is located in Lipetsk Oblast |
| January 14 (day 100): Oryol | 2014 Winter Olympics torch relay is located in Oryol Oblast |
| January 15 (day 101): Bryansk | 2014 Winter Olympics torch relay is located in Bryansk Oblast |
| January 16 (day 102): Kursk | 2014 Winter Olympics torch relay is located in Kursk Oblast |
| January 17 (day 103): Belgorod | 2014 Winter Olympics torch relay is located in Belgorod Oblast |
| January 18 (day 104): Voronezh | 2014 Winter Olympics torch relay is located in Voronezh Oblast |
| January 19 (day 105): Uryupinsk; January 20 (day 106): Volgograd | 2014 Winter Olympics torch relay is located in Volgograd Oblast |
| January 21 (day 107): Novocherkassk; January 21 (day 107): Shakhty; January 22 (day 108): Rostov-on-Don | 2014 Winter Olympics torch relay is located in Rostov Oblast |
| January 23 (day 109): Pyatigorsk; January 24 (day 110): Stavropol | 2014 Winter Olympics torch relay is located in Stavropol Krai |
| January 25 (day 111): Elista; January 25 (day 111): Yashkulsky | 2014 Winter Olympics torch relay is located in Kalmykia |
| January 26 (day 112): Astrakhan | 2014 Winter Olympics torch relay is located in Astrakhan Oblast |
| January 27 (day 113): Makhachkala | 2014 Winter Olympics torch relay is located in Republic of Dagestan |
| January 27 (day 113): Cherkessk | 2014 Winter Olympics torch relay is located in Karachay-Cherkessia |
| January 28 (day 114): Grozny | 2014 Winter Olympics torch relay is located in Chechnya |
| January 28 (day 114): Magas; January 28 (day 114): Nazran | 2014 Winter Olympics torch relay is located in Republic of Ingushetia |
January 29 (day 115): Not travelling, staying in Nazran
| January 30 (day 116): Vladikavkaz | 2014 Winter Olympics torch relay is located in North Ossetia–Alania |
| January 30 (day 116): Nalchik; February 1 (day 118): Mount Elbrus | 2014 Winter Olympics torch relay is located in Kabardino-Balkaria |
February 2 (day 119): Not travelling, staying in Mount Elbrus
| February 3 (day 120): Maykop | 2014 Winter Olympics torch relay is located in Republic of Adygea |
| February 4 (day 121): Krasnodar; February 5–7 (day 122–124): Sochi | 2014 Winter Olympics torch relay is located in Krasnodar Krai |

== Protests ==
Gay activist Pavel Lebedev (not to be confused with Russian retired figure skater Pavel Lebedev) was arrested at the relay in Voronezh for unveiling a rainbow flag. When interviewed, he said "hosting the games here contradicts the basic principles of the Olympics, which is to cultivate tolerance".
