= Michael Rodrigues (acrobatic gymnast) =

American acrobatic gymnast

- Born: August 31, 1982 (age 44)

Gymnastics career
- Discipline: Acrobatic gymnastics
- Country represented: United States
- Gym: West Coast Training Center
- Head coaches: Youri Vorobyev; Marie Annonson
- Retired: 2010
Medal record
Acrobatic Gymnastics
Representing United States
World Games
Gold medal – first place	2009 Kaohsiung	Mixed Pair All-Around
World Championships
Gold medal – first place	2010 Wroclaw	Mixed Pair All-Around
Silver medal – second place	2008 Glasgow	Mixed Pair All-Around
Bronze medal – third place	2006 Coimbra	Mixed Pair All-Around
World Cup
Gold medal – first place	2009 St. Paul	Mixed Pair All-Around
Silver medal – second place	2006 Puurs	Mixed Pair All-Around
International Competitions
Silver medal – second place	2009 Acro Cup	Mixed Pair All-Around
Gold medal – first place	2005 Freedom Cup	Mixed Pair All-Around
Gold medal – first place	2005 Machuga Cup	Mixed Pair All-Around
Bronze medal – third place	2004 Acro Cup	Mixed Pair All-Around
Bronze medal – third place	2003 Freedom Cup	Mixed Pair All-Around
Silver medal – second place	2002 Winterthur Cup	Mixed Pair All-Around
National Championships
Gold medal – first place	2010 Kissimmee	Mixed Pair All-Around
Silver medal – second place	2009 Dallas	Mixed Pair All-Around
Gold medal – first place	2008 Des Moines	Mixed Pair All-Around
Gold medal – first place	2006 Kansas City	Mixed Pair All-Around
Gold medal – first place	2005 Louisville	Mixed Pair All-Around
Bronze medal – third place	2004 Palm Springs	Mixed Pair All-Around
Bronze medal – third place	2003 Jacksonville	Mixed Pair All-Around
Bronze medal – third place	2002 New Orleans	Mixed Pair All-Around

Michael Rodrigues (born August 31, 1982) is a retired elite acrobatic gymnast who now performs in the Cirque du Soleil show Viva ELVIS in Las Vegas, Nevada, along with his former mixed-pairs partner, retired elite acrobatic gymnast Kristin Allen.

Allen and Rodrigues won the gold medal in the mixed-pair all-around at the 2010 Acrobatic Gymnastics World Championships in Wrocław, Poland. They also won the all-around title at 2010 U.S. National Acrobatic Gymnastics Championships in Kissimmee, Florida, placing first in the all-around, dynamic and balance.

They became the first U.S. athletes to win the mixed-pairs gold medal at the 2009 World Games in Kaohsiung, Taiwan, which are considered the equivalent of the Olympic Games for acrobatic gymnastics. At the 2009 Acro Cup in Albershausen, Germany, the pair placed first in dynamic and second in the all-around and in balance.

The previous year, Rodrigues and Allen won the mixed-pair all-around silver medal at the World Championships in Glasgow, Scotland. At the 2008 National Championships and Junior Olympics Nationals in Des Moines, Iowa, the pair won the all-around, dynamic and balance.)

Allen and Rodrigues trained together at West Coast Training Center in Livermore, California, with coach Marie Annonson. The pair became partners in August 2007.

Rodrigues was a member of the U.S. Senior National Team from 200 to 2011, and Allen was a member of the U.S. Senior National Team from 2006 to 2011.

Prior to competing with Allen, Rodrigues was the base of an elite mixed pair with now-retired acrobatic gymnast Clare Brunson, and they trained together at Empire AcroGymnastics in Riverside, California and Mission Hills Gymnastics, also in Riverside. The pair were trained by Russian coach Youri Vorobyev, who is now owner and head acrobatics coach of Realis Gymnastics Academy in Moreno Valley, California.

In 2006, Michael Rodrigues and Clare Brunson won the mixed-pair all-around bronze medal at the 2006 World Championships in Coimbra, Portugal, and were designated World Class Gymnasts by the Federation of International Gymnastics (FIG). They also won the all-around silver medal at the 2006 World Cup in Puurs, Belgium.

In 2005, Rodrigues and Brunson placed fourth all-around at the 2005 World Games in Duisburg, Germany.
