= Mark Fyson =

British acrobatic gymnast (born 1981)

- Born: 21 August 1981 (age 45) Orpington, England
- Height: 1.69 m (5 ft 7 in)

Gymnastics career
- Discipline: Acrobatic gymnastics
- Country represented: Great Britain
- Club: Spelthorne
- Gym: Spelthorne
- Retired: 2009
Medal record
Men's acrobatic gymnastics
Representing Great Britain
World Games
Bronze medal – third place	2005 Duisburg	Men's pair
World Championships
Bronze medal – third place	2008 Glasgow	Men's pair
European Championships
Bronze medal – third place	2005 Thessaloniki	Men's pair

Mark Fyson (born 21 August 1981) is a British former acrobatic gymnast.

Fyson won the bronze medal in the men's pairs discipline at the World Games in 2005, and a further bronze at the European Acrobatic Gymmnastics Championships, both in partnership with Chris Jones.

Fyson later partnered Edward Upcott to win bronze in the 2008 world championships men's pairs discipline in Glasgow. He retired in 2009.

He studied at Durham University.
