= Chris Jones (gymnast) =

British acrobatic gymnast

- Full name: Christopher Jones
- Born: 5 March 1987 (age 39) Durham, England
- Height: 161 cm (5 ft 3 in)

Gymnastics career
- Discipline: Acrobatic gymnastics
- Country represented: United Kingdom
Medal record
World Games
Bronze medal – third place	2005 Duisburg	Men's pair (with Mark Fyson)
European Acrobatic Gymmnastics Championships
Bronze medal – third place	2005 Thessaloniki	Men's pair (with Mark Fyson)

Christopher Jones (born 5 March 1987) is a British acrobatic gymnast that represented Great Britain, achieving a bronze medal in the men's pairs discipline at the World Games in 2005, and a further bronze at the European Acrobatic Gymmnastics Championships, both in partnership with Mark Fyson.
