= Gymnastics at the 2009 World Games =

Gymnastics at the World Games 2009.

Gymnastics has been part of all World Games. Among the disciplines, there are rhythmic gymnastics, trampolining and tumbling as well as acrobatics and aerobics. Artistic gymnastics are not contested at the World Games because all of its disciplines have always been Olympic sports.

== Medalists ==
=== Acrobatic gymnastics ===
Event	Gold	Silver	Bronze
Men's pairs	Ukraine; Mykola Shcherbak; Serhiy Popov	Russia; Alexei Dudchenko; Konstantin Pilipchuk	United Kingdom; Douglas Fordyce; Edward Upcott
Men's groups	China; Sheng Fang; Youliang Han; Wangxin Xue; Yu Chao Zhao	United Kingdom; Adam Buckingham; Adam McAssey; Jonathan Stranks; Alex Uttley	Ukraine; Andriy Bilozor; Denis Kriuchkov; Andrii Lytvak; Roman Urazbakiyev
Women's pairs	Belgium; Tatiana de Vos; Florence Henrist	Azerbaijan; Ayla Ammadova; Dilara Sultanova	United Kingdom; Mollie Grehan; Maiken Thorne
Women's groups	Russia; Ekaterina Loginova; Aygul Shaykhudinova; Ekaterina Stroynova	United Kingdom; Rebecca Richardson; Candice Slater; Beth Young	Ukraine; Kateryna Kalíta; Yuliya Odintsova; Natalia Vinnik
Mixed pairs	United States; Kristin Allen; Michael Rodrigues	Belgium; Julie van Gelder; Menno Vanderghote	United Kingdom; Katie Axten; Nicholas Illingworth

=== Aerobic gymnastics ===
Event	Gold	Silver	Bronze
Men's individual	Ivan Parejo (ESP)	Morgan Jacquemin (FRA)	Alexander Kondratichev (RUS)
Women's individual	Marcela Lopez (BRA)	Angella McMillan (NZL)	Huang Jinxuan (CHN)
Mixed pairs	France; Aurelie Joly; Julien Chaninet	Spain; Sara Moreno; Vicente Lli	China; Huang Jinxuan; He Shijian
Trios	Romania; Mircea Brinzea; Valentin Mavrodineanu; Mircea Zamfir	China; Tao Le; Che Lei; Zhang Peng	France; Benjamin Garavel; Nicolas Garavel; Morgan Jacquemin
Groups	China	Romania	Russia

=== Rhythmic gymnastics (women's individual) ===
Event	Gold	Silver	Bronze
Rope	Evgenia Kanaeva (RUS)	Anna Bessonova (UKR)	Olga Kapranova (RUS)
Hoop	Evgenia Kanaeva (RUS)	Olga Kapranova (RUS)	Sylvia Miteva (BUL)
Ball	Evgenia Kanaeva (RUS)	Anna Bessonova (UKR)	Melitina Staniouta (BLR)
Ribbon	Evgenia Kanaeva (RUS)	Anna Bessonova (UKR)	Aliya Garayeva (AZE)

=== Trampoline ===
Event	Gold	Silver	Bronze
Men's synchro	Japan; Ito Masaki; Shunsuke Nagasaki	France; Sebastien Martiny; Gregoire Pennes	Germany; Martin Gromowski; Dennis Luxon-Pitkamin
Women's synchro	China; Qingwen Gu; Yiqi Jiang; Ukraine; Iuliia Domchevska; Olena Movchan	None awarded	Germany; Carina Baumgartner; Jessica Simon
Men's double-mini individual	Russia; Kiril Ivanov	Portugal; Nuno Lico	Germany; Nico Gärtner
Women's double-mini individual	Russia; Victoria Voronina	United States; Sarah Prosen	United States; Aubree Balkan

=== Tumbling ===
Event	Gold	Silver	Bronze
Men's individual	Russia; Andrey Krylov	United Kingdom; Michael Barnes	Ukraine; Viktor Kyforenko
Women's individual	Russia; Anna Korobeynikova	Russia; Anzhelika Soldatkina	Canada; Emily Smith

== See also ==
- Gymnastics at the World Games
