= The Magna Carta School =

Location
- Thorpe Road; Staines, TW18 3HJ; England
- Coordinates: 51.42779°N 0.52164°W

Information
- Former name: The Egham Hythe Secondary Modern School
- Type: Academy
- Motto: "Respect, Learn, Aspire, Achieve"
- Established: 2011 (as academy)
- Local authority: Surrey
- Specialist: Technology and IT
- Department for Education URN: 137116 Tables
- Ofsted: Reports
- Principal: Craig Adams
- Gender: Coeducational
- Age: 11 to 16
- Enrolment: 1077
- Capacity: 1275
- Houses: Magna, Abbey, Bridge and Thames
- Colours: Red, yellow, green, blue
- Website: mcs-unity.co.uk

The Magna Carta School is an 11–16 academy school in Staines, England, which has been awarded specialisms in Technology and ICT. It is named after Magna Carta due to its proximity to Runnymede, where the document was signed.

== History ==
The school is an academy conversion. It was officially opened on 1 August 2011.

In 2016, students at the school drew up a young people's manifesto to present to MPs after many of the students' homes were hit by severe floods in 2013-14. The students asked for "clearer warnings, grants for defences, help for vulnerable people and pets, and fairer insurance."

In 2023, Raac was found in some of the school's buildings. The school remained open and received funding to mitigate the cost of repair work.

== Achievements ==
The school was awarded Artsmark Gold status in June 2010 and several student representatives attended an Arts Council England ceremony in Brighton.

The school became the first Apple RTC (Regional Training Centre) in Surrey in 2010; this included a new Apple suite with the introduction of high definition video conferencing for national/international interactive learning.

== Notable alumni ==
- Harvey Elliott (attended Magna Carta 2014–2016), a footballer for Liverpool FC. Elliott made his first-team debut in September 2018, becoming the youngest player to play in the EFL Cup, aged 15 years and 174 days.
- Matt Lapinskas, a former pupil, was an actor in EastEnders, playing the part of Anthony Moon. He judges the yearly competition "Magna's Got Talent" at the school
- Mykola Pawluk, television video editor and two-times BAFTA nominee.
- Billy Reeves, songwriter and BBC journalist, who wrote hits for Sophie Ellis-Bextor in her first band theaudience.
- Alice Upcott and Edward Upcott and their team from Spelbound, won Britain's Got Talent on UK TV in 2010.

== Solar Panels ==
The school has a MaidEnergy Co-op Community-owned solar panel installation, producing lower carbon power to the school, at a discount price compared to power from the network.
