= Twist and Pulse =

English street dance duo

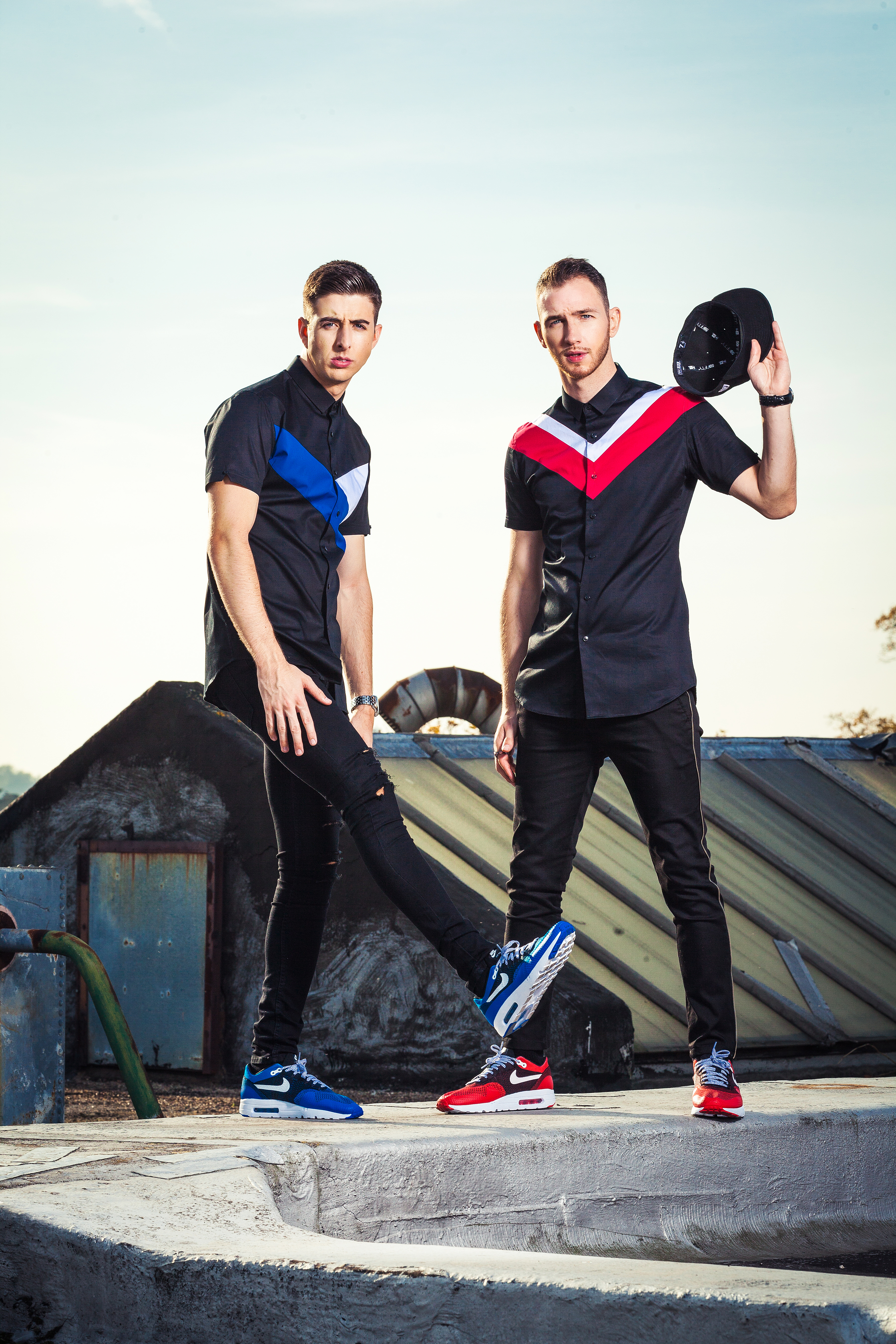

Background information
- Origin: London, England
- Genres: Street dance (popping, roboting, lyrical hip hop, contemporary hip-hop dance
- Years active: 2010–present
- Members: Ashley Glazebrook (Twist); Glen Murphy (Pulse)

Ashley Glazebrook (Note: now Glazebrook-Durbidge after marrying Liam Durbidge) and Glen Murphy, better known by their stage name Twist and Pulse, are an English street dance duo based in London. They were the runners-up of the fourth series of Britain's Got Talent in 2010, coming second to Spelbound in the live final, but later won the spin-off show Britain's Got Talent: The Champions in 2019, becoming the Champion of Champions.

In 2012, they presented and performed at every date of the 70-day Olympic Torch Relay Tour and also at the basketball, badminton and volleyball events at the London 2012 Summer Olympics.

== Origin ==
Ashley Glazebrook (aka Twist) was born 28 March 1991 in Sidcup, London. He has two brothers and four step-brothers. From a young age he loved music, especially by Michael Jackson. At the Business Academy Bexley secondary school in Thamesmead, south-east London, Glazebrook began to show an interest in dance and joined a local street dance group, performing at events such as the Streetdance Weekend UK Championships and the World Hip Hop Championships in Las Vegas.

Glen Murphy (aka Pulse) was born 22 October 1990 at Guy's Hospital in London. He attended Dalmain Primary School and Forest Hill School.

Glazebrook and Murphy met at the BRIT School of Performing Arts and Technology where they were both studying for a BTEC National Diploma in dance, training in ballet, tap dance, contemporary and jazz dance. Glazebrook was studying for his A levels as well. They discovered they shared a wacky sense of humour and quickly became best friends. With college coming to an end, they formed a duo called the Cheeky Boiz, and began rehearsing their "streetomedy" performances – a blend of streetdance and comedy which led to appearing in the finals of Britain's Got Talent in 2010. They performed on the Daybreak morning show on ITV, in the week leading up to the 2011 Britain's Got Talent.

== Britain's Got Talent ==
Twist and Pulse took the auditions by storm with their unique dance style "streetcomedy", a fusion of street dance and comedy. Their dancing to the EastEnders theme and The Cheeky Girls' "Touch My Bum" received three "yes" votes from the judges at their London audition. They went on to sail through the auditions and semi-final and finished as runners-up.

Declan "Dec" Donnelly said, "These two guys come on and dance to the EastEnders theme tune. That's clever and new." Anthony "Ant" McPartlin laughed, "It took me back 15 years ago to when me and Dec were PJ and Duncan but they could actually dance!" Dec chimed in, "If they can present a TV show, we're screwed!"

Twist and Pulse returned for Britain's Got Talent: The Champions in 2019, and, after receiving the Golden Buzzer from Alesha Dixon, they won the show outright over top 3 rivals BGT's Stavros Flatley and Ukraine's Got Talent winner Kseniya Simonova. This makes them the first golden buzzer acts to also win first place in the Britain's Got Talent brand.

== TV appearances ==
In 2010 Twist and Pulse's TV appearances included ITV's Magic Numbers, where they did a dance that was made up from music from blockbuster films such as The Matrix, Titanic and Pirates of the Caribbean. They also appeared on The 5 O'Clock Show, This Morning, Teen Nick, and The Seven Thirty Show on UTV.

In April 2011, Twist and Pulse were guests on Keith Lemon's ITV2 show, Celebrity Juice.

On 30 September 2011 they performed and won on CBBC's The Slammer Season 4, episode 3 - "Slammer Grannies".

They returned to Britain's Got Talent in 2012 with their own dance troupe, Twist and Pulse Dance Company, which reached the live semi-finals.

They appeared on the US TV show Jodie Marsh Brawn as special guest choreographers, choreographing her world championship body building routine which she won.

In 2013, Twist and Pulse travelled to China to perform for their biggest streetdance TV show on CCTV News, which aired to over 400,000,000 viewers.

In March 2013, Twist and Pulse appeared on BBC One's Let's Dance for Comic Relief with Lee Nelson. They danced to a "Swan Lake Hip-Hop Remix" produced by Glen Murphy. They were saved by the dance panel and went to the final.

In February 2019, Twist and Pulse made up part of a team on ITV1's Tenable.

They competed in Britain's Got Talent: The Champions on 28 September 2019, where they received a golden buzzer from Alesha Dixon. They were voted as the winners in the final, broadcast on 5 October 2019.

== Live performances ==
Twist and Pulse toured with BGT Live, visiting 14 towns. Since then, they have been all over the country performing, including at the Midlands Music Festival where they were watched by an audience of 20,000. They did a summer tour of all three Butlin's holiday camps and were booked for celebrity weddings and private parties.

In December 2010, BBC NI invited Twist and Pulse to perform live on Children in Need 2010 in front of a large crowd at the Odyssey.

In 2011 they supported Jedward on their fourth Irish tour in August, called 'The Carnival Tour'. This included ten dates, and on the main stage at T4 on the Beach.

They had been touring with the Olympic Torch for 67 dates and performing every night at the torch stopovers, playing to crowds of up to 70,000 per night.

They were invited to perform at the basketball, badminton and volleyball venues during the London 2012 Olympic Games.

Twist and Pulse opened the Children's BAFTAs with a performance and presented the award for 'Learning – Secondary'.

== Pantomime ==
Between December 2013 and January 2014, they were cast as 'PC Hip' and 'PC Hop' in the Theatre Royal Windsor pantomime production of Aladdin; (produced by Bill Kenwright), and then in December 2014 at the Chatham Central Theatre pantomime production of Aladdin, (with Todd Carty, produced by Jordan Productions).

Then they were cast in December 2015 as 'Pirate Swash' and 'Pirate Buckle' in the Devonshire Park Theatre in the Eastbourne pantomime production of Peter Pan, and in the November - January 2017, at the Gordon Craig Theatre in the Stevenage pantomime production of Peter Pan.

In 2018 they were cast as 'PC Hip' and 'PC Hop' in Jordan Productions Aladdin at the lighthouse theatre Kettering. They also Choreographed and had their directing debut.

In 2019 they were cast as PC Hip & Hop at the King's Lynn Corn Exchange.

The duo are due to perform in Sleeping Beauty at the Regent Theatre in Ipswich in 2023.

== Choreography ==
Twist and Pulse have always choreographed their own routines. In 2012, their dance company TPDC (Twist and Pulse Dance Company) competed in series 6 of Britain's Got Talent, and made it to the semi-finals.

In 2015 they choreographed their first full pantomime, Peter Pan, in the Gordon Craig theatre which ran for ten weeks.

In 2016 they choreographed 'Jack and the Beanstalk' in the Gordon Craig Theatre as well as a production of 'Snow White' at the Lighthouse Theatre in Kettering.

In 2017 they choreographed a production of 'Snow White' in the Gordon Craig Theatre and 'Aladdin' at the Lighthouse Theatre in Kettering.

== Brand work ==
They helped launch Renault's new electric car, the "Renault Twizy", in Covent Garden.

They appeared in Canon's commercial for the new Legria Mini.

Twist and Pulse have worked with Red Bull, Red Bull BC One, Kellogg's, Warner Bros., The Brit Awards, Cadbury, EE, Disney, Lego, McDonald's, Mars, DC Comics, Sky One, Specsavers, 20th Century Fox, Lionsgate, Samsung, Sennheiser, Juice Burst and Muller crumble corner.

== Charity work ==
In December 2010, BBC NI invited Twist and Pulse to perform live on Children in Need 2010 in front of a large crowd at the Odyssey.

In June 2011, they performed at many schools in England to promote their new single "Jump". They helped the charity Fairbridge to raise money with two flash mobs at St Katharine Docks and Marble Arch.

They also performed at Bluewater Shopping Centre as part of the Children in Need event.

In the week of the live finals, they appeared as contestants on Who Wants to Be a Millionaire?, where they won £5,000 for the Danceaid charity.

Twist and Pulse are also ambassadors with the Diana Award youth charity.

== Guinness World Record ==
Twist and Pulse earned a Guinness World Record for the most synchronised moves done in 30 seconds, with 130 moves.

== Recording career ==
Having spent a year with a well known producer who wrote and produced their records, the duo released their first single, "Jump", on 3 July 2011.
