= Mike Fantastic =

British electropop artist

- Origin: Cardiff, Wales
- Genre: Electro-pop
- Years active: 2010–2011, 2012–present
- Label: GDM Corp LTD/Sony
- Members: Owen Sheppard
- Past members: Michael Rudge; Olly Howells; Matt Birch; Luke Welsby
- Website: mikefantastic.com

Mike Fantastic is a British electropop artist formed in 2010. Mike Fantastic was initially made notable by their début on Britain's Got Talent in May 2010, and have since released an album and two singles.

== History ==
The band's first performance and début TV appearance was as an audition for the 2010 Britain's Got Talent series 4, in which they were well received. They performed with five band members, consisting of Owen Sheppard on vocals and bongos, Michael Rudge and Olly Howells on keyboards and electronics, Matt Birch on bass and Luke Welsby on drums. Michael Rudge subsequently left the band as a result of pre-existing commitments. They have performed on tour with Peter Andre and have also played with The Overtones, Olly Murs and performed alongside them.

In November 2011, the band ended for a short period due to management issues, returning in February 2012 with Owen being the only remaining member.

== Musical style and influences ==
The band's music is influenced by funk, disco-pop and dubstep music from current and past decades, and draws inspiration from Earth Wind & Fire, Prince, La Roux and Alphabeat, among others.

Their music style was created through a desire to move away from guitars and the 'generic rock' sounds of their previous bands.

== Band members ==
Current members

- Owen Sheppard – lead vocals, production, programming, percussion, song writing (2010–2011, 2012–present)

Former members

- Michael "Mike" Rudge – keyboard, electronics (2010)
- Olly Howells - keyboard, electronics (2010–2011)
- Matt "Birchy" Birch - bass (2010–2011)
- Luke Welsby - drums (2010–2011)

== Discography ==
=== Albums ===
Year	Album title	Release date
2011	You Like This	25 March 2011

=== Singles ===
Year	Single	Release date
2010	"Turn Off The Lights"	26 July 2010
2011	"Clearly I'm Invisible"	10 January 2011
