= Adam Buckingham =

British acrobatic gymnast (born 1988)

- Born: 29 July 1988 (age 38)
- Height: 1.83 m (6 ft 0 in)

Gymnastics career
- Discipline: Acrobatic gymnastics
- Country represented: United Kingdom
- Club: Heathrow Gymnastics Club
- Head coach: Neil Griffiths
- Assistant coach: Andrew Griffiths
- Choreographer: Nicola Yellop
- Retired: yes
Medal record
Men's acrobatic gymnastics
Representing Great Britain
World Championships
Gold medal – first place	2010 Wrocław	Men's Fours

Adam Buckingham (born 29 July 1988) is a British acrobatic gymnast who won the title of world men's fours champion with Adam McAssey, Alex Uttley and Jonathan Stranks in July 2010 in Poland.

McAssey was a member of Spelbound, the gymnastic group who rose to fame in 2010, winning the fourth series of Britain's Got Talent. The prize was £100,000 and the opportunity to appear at the 2010 Royal Variety Performance.
