= Kristin Allen =

American acrobatic gymnast

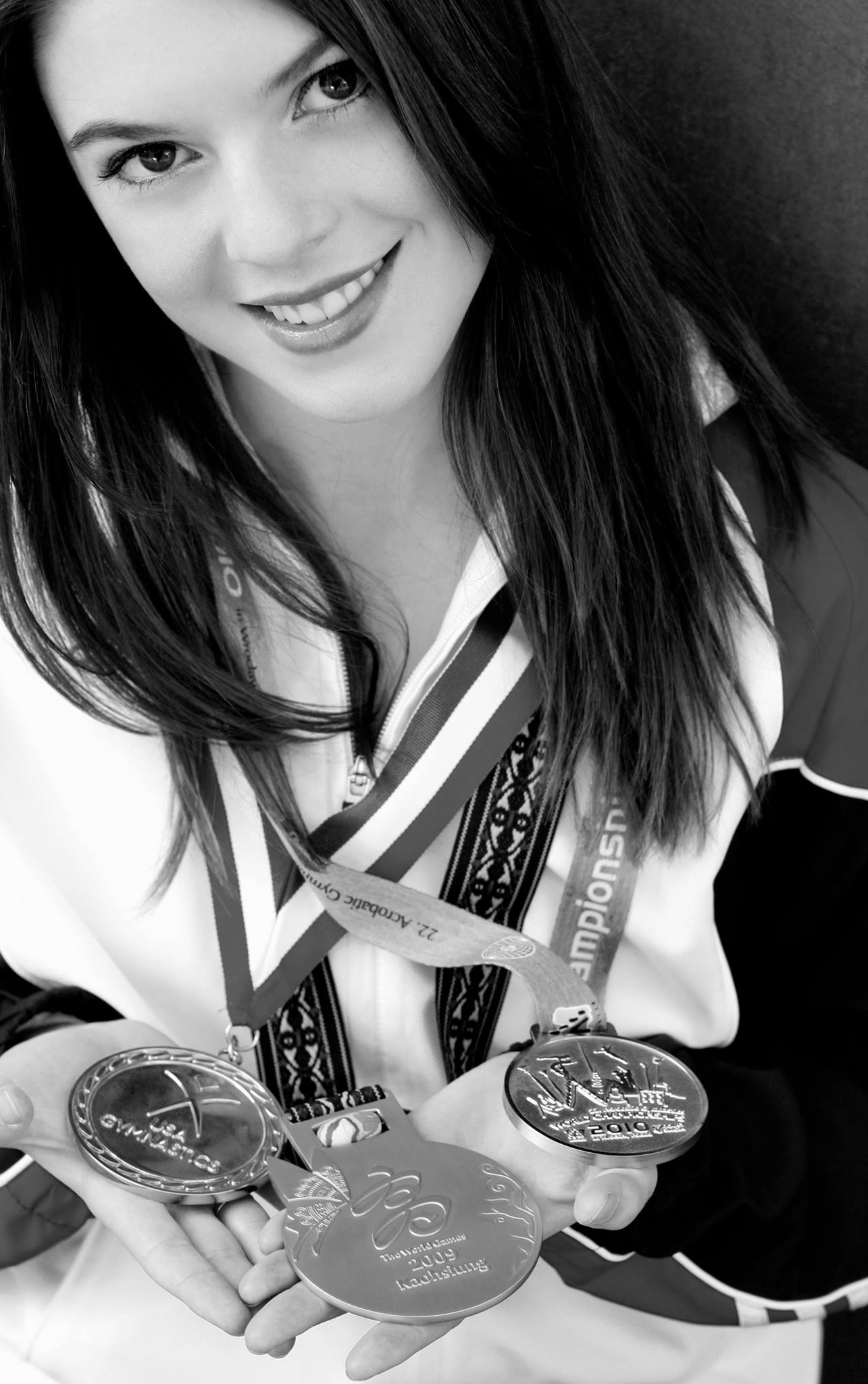

Personal information
- Full name: Kristin Allen
- Born: July 10, 1992 (age 34) Livermore, California, U.S.

Gymnastics career
- Discipline: Acrobatic gymnastics
- Country represented: United States
- Gym: West Coast Training Center
- Head coach: Marie Annonson
Medal record
Acrobatic gymnastics
Representing United States
World Games
Gold medal – first place	2009 Kaohsiung	Mixed Pair
World Championships
Gold medal – first place	2010 Wroclaw	Mixed Pair
Silver medal – second place	2008 Glasgow	Mixed Pair
World Cup
Gold medal – first place	2009 St. Paul	Mixed Pair
National Championships
Gold medal – first place	2010 Kissimmee	Mixed Pair

Kristin Allen (born July 10, 1992) is a Hall of Fame American acrobatic gymnast. Kristin and her partner Michael Rodrigues made history by becoming the first American mixed pair to win a gold medal from the World Games in 2009 and the second American pair to win the Acrobatic Gymnastics World Championships in 2010. Domestically, the pair have won national titles in 2008 and 2010. She competed for the United States of America Gymnastics from 2001 until her retirement in August 2010 and spent five of those years on the Senior National Team.

Following the 2010 Worlds, Allen and Rodrigues were a featured hand-to-hand act in Cirque du Soleil’s “Viva Elvis” in Las Vegas. She gained further fame by competing in, and winning season 1 of the BBC show Tumble with partner Bobby Lockwood. After her Tumble appearance, she went on to perform in "Pippin" on Broadway.

On December 9, 2014, she was announced as a member of the 2015 USA Gymnastics Hall of Fame class.

== Personal life ==
Kristin Allen was born in Livermore, California. Kristin has a younger brother named Kyle Allen who studied at the Kirov Academy of Ballet in Washington D.C and became an actor. Kristin started doing acrobatic gymnastics in 2001 after watching her best friend from elementary school practice acrobatic gymnastics. Kristin and her partner Michael Rodrigues both trained at the West Coast Training Center in Livermore, California.

== Competitions ==
Kristin Allen’s career is divided into two different categories for her achievements.

=== National Competitions ===
2010 National Championships, Kissimmee, Florida: 1st-AA, DY, BL

2009 Visa Championships, Dallas Texas: 2nd-AA

2008 National Championships & J.O. Nationals, Des Moines, Iowa: 1st-AA, DY, BL

2007 Visa Championships, San Jose, California:1st-DDY; 2nd-AA, BL

2007 Junior Olympic National Championships, Palm Springs, California: 2nd-AA, DY, BL

2006 National Championships, Kansas City, MO: 3rd-AA

2004 National Championships, Palm Springs, California: 1st-AA

2003 National Championships, Jacksonville, Florida: 1st-AA

=== International Competitions ===
2010 Acrobatic Gymnastics World Championships, Wroclaw, Poland: 1st-AA

2009 Freedom Cup, St. Paul, Minn: 1st-AA, BL; 3rd-DY

2009 World Games, Kaohsiung, Taiwan: 1st-AA

2009 Acro Cup, Albershausen, Germany: 1st- DY; 2nd- AA, BL

2008 Acrobatic Gymnastics World Championships, Glasgow, Scotland: 2nd-AA

2006 British Open Tournament, Stoke-on-Trent, Great Britain: 2nd-AA

2006 Flanders International Acro Cup, Puurs, Belgium: 1st-AA

Legend: DY= Dynamic, BL= Balance, AA= All Around

== Honors and awards ==
Kristin Allen holds many awards beyond her medals, including USA Gymnastics' Athlete of the Year award, Sportsperson of the Year award, Best Choreography award, and the Glen Sundby Outstanding Pair Performance award. She was designated as a World Class Gymnast by the Federation of International Gymnastics in 2008. In 2009, she and her gymnastics partner, Michael, were named U.S. acro Athletes of the Year. On December 9, 2014, USA Gymnastics announced that Kristin would be a member of their 2015 Hall of Fame class.
