= Evgeniya Kanaeva =

Russian rhythmic gymnast (born 1990)

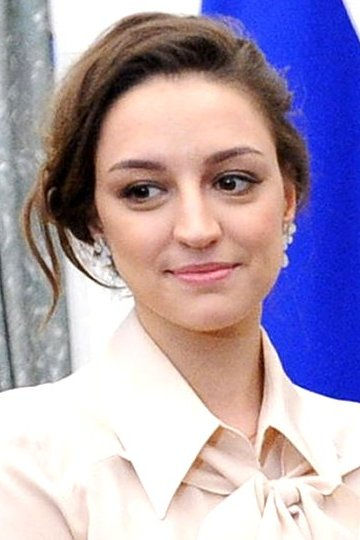
- Kanaeva in 2015

Personal information
- Full name: Evgeniya Olegovna Kanaeva
- Alternative name: Evgenia Kanaeva
- Nicknames: Zhenya, The Queen of Rhythmic Gymnastics
- Born: 2 April 1990 (age 36) Omsk, Soviet Union
- Height: 171 cm (5 ft 7 in)

Gymnastics career
- Discipline: Rhythmic gymnastics
- Country represented: Russia; (2005–2012)
- Club: CSKA Moscow
- Gym: Novogorsk
- Head coach: Irina Viner
- Assistant coach: Vera Shtelbaums
- Choreographer: Irina Zenovka; Veronica Shatkova; Ludmila Dimitrova
- Eponymous skills: Kanaeva: Rotation 180 degrees on the chest, legs in split position without help
- Retired: 2012
- World ranking: 1 (2012 Season); 5 (2011 Season); 1 (2010 Season); 1 (2009 Season); 1 (2008 Season); 6 (2007 Season)
Medal record
International gymnastics competitions
Event	1st	2nd	3rd
Olympic Games	2	0	0
World Championships	17	1	0
European Championships	13	1	0
World Cup Final	3	0	0
FIG World Cup	101	17	6
Grand Prix Final	15	0	0
World Games	4	0	0
Summer Universiade	9	1	0
Total	164	20	6
Rhythmic Gymnastics
Representing Russia
Olympic Games
Gold medal – first place	2008 Beijing	All-Around
Gold medal – first place	2012 London	All-Around
World Championships
Gold medal – first place	2007 Patras	Team
Gold medal – first place	2009 Mie	All-around
Gold medal – first place	2009 Mie	Ball
Gold medal – first place	2009 Mie	Hoop
Gold medal – first place	2009 Mie	Ribbon
Gold medal – first place	2009 Mie	Rope
Gold medal – first place	2009 Mie	Team
Gold medal – first place	2010 Moscow	All-around
Gold medal – first place	2010 Moscow	Ball
Gold medal – first place	2010 Moscow	Hoop
Gold medal – first place	2010 Moscow	Team
Gold medal – first place	2011 Montpellier	All-around
Gold medal – first place	2011 Montpellier	Ball
Gold medal – first place	2011 Montpellier	Hoop
Gold medal – first place	2011 Montpellier	Clubs
Gold medal – first place	2011 Montpellier	Ribbon
Gold medal – first place	2011 Montpellier	Team
Silver medal – second place	2010 Moscow	Rope
European Championships
Gold medal – first place	2007 Baku	Team
Gold medal – first place	2007 Baku	Ribbon
Gold medal – first place	2008 Torino	All-around
Gold medal – first place	2009 Baku	Team
Gold medal – first place	2009 Baku	Ball
Gold medal – first place	2009 Baku	Hoop
Gold medal – first place	2009 Baku	Ribbon
Gold medal – first place	2009 Baku	Rope
Gold medal – first place	2010 Bremen	All-around
Gold medal – first place	2011 Minsk	Team
Gold medal – first place	2011 Minsk	Hoop
Gold medal – first place	2011 Minsk	Ribbon
Gold medal – first place	2012 Nizhny Novgorod	All-around
Silver medal – second place	2011 Minsk	Ball
World Cup Final
Gold medal – first place	2008 Benidorm	Clubs
Gold medal – first place	2008 Benidorm	Hoop
Gold medal – first place	2008 Benidorm	Ribbon
Grand Prix Final
Gold medal – first place	2009 Berlin	All-around
Gold medal – first place	2009 Berlin	Rope
Gold medal – first place	2009 Berlin	Hoop
Gold medal – first place	2009 Berlin	Ball
Gold medal – first place	2009 Berlin	Ribbon
Gold medal – first place	2010 Berlin	All-around
Gold medal – first place	2010 Berlin	Rope
Gold medal – first place	2010 Berlin	Hoop
Gold medal – first place	2010 Berlin	Ball
Gold medal – first place	2010 Berlin	Ribbon
Gold medal – first place	2011 Brno	All-around
Gold medal – first place	2011 Brno	Ball
Gold medal – first place	2011 Brno	Hoop
Gold medal – first place	2011 Brno	Clubs
Gold medal – first place	2011 Brno	Ribbon
World Games
Gold medal – first place	2009 Kaohsiung	Ball
Gold medal – first place	2009 Kaohsiung	Hoop
Gold medal – first place	2009 Kaohsiung	Ribbon
Gold medal – first place	2009 Kaohsiung	Rope
Summer Universiade
Gold medal – first place	2009 Belgrade	All-around
Gold medal – first place	2009 Belgrade	Ball
Gold medal – first place	2009 Belgrade	Rope
Gold medal – first place	2009 Belgrade	Hoop
Gold medal – first place	2009 Belgrade	Ribbon
Gold medal – first place	2011 Shenzhen	All-around
Gold medal – first place	2011 Shenzhen	Ball
Gold medal – first place	2011 Shenzhen	Clubs
Gold medal – first place	2011 Shenzhen	Hoop
Silver medal – second place	2011 Shenzhen	Ribbon

Evgeniya Olegovna Kanaeva OMF (Russian: Евгения Олеговна Канаева; born 2 April 1990) is a retired Russian individual rhythmic gymnast. She is the only individual rhythmic gymnast in history to win two Olympic all-around gold medals, winning at the 2008 Summer Olympics, where she finished with 3.75 points ahead of silver medalist Inna Zhukova, and at the 2012 Summer Olympics, where she also became the oldest gymnast to win the Olympic gold. On 4 July 2013, Kanaeva received the International Fair Play Award for "Sport and Life".

Kanaeva holds the record for most World titles with seventeen and thirteen European titles. Kanaeva shares the record for most individual world all-around titles with Maria Petrova (1995 tied with Ekaterina Serebrianskaya), Maria Gigova (1971 tied with Galima Shugurova) and fellow Russian gymnasts Yana Kudryavtseva and Dina Averina, and Kanaeva is the one of only three gymnasts to have won all three titles without being tied, impossible due to the tie breaking system even though she never was tied for a title.

At the 2009 World Championship in Mie, Japan, Kanaeva became the first rhythmic gymnast to win all six titles. She repeated the feat at the 2011 World Championship in Montpellier, France, equaling her own record.

In 2009, Kanaeva was awarded the title Merited Master of Sports in Russia. After the 2012 Summer Olympics, on 15 August at the Grand Kremlin Palace, Kanaeva, along with fellow Olympic gold medalists, was awarded the Merit for the Fatherland IV Degree. Russian President Vladimir Putin presented the honors.

Kanaeva is the only gymnast to receive a perfect score under the 30-point judging system, having done so twice: in the 2011 Grand Prix Final in Brno and in the 2012 Grand Prix in Vorarlberg.

== Early life ==
Evgeniya Kanaeva was born on 2 April 1990 in Omsk, Soviet Union. Her mother, Svetlana, was also a rhythmic gymnast and was granted the title of Master of Sports. Her father, Oleg Kanaev, was a coach and a former Greco-Roman wrestler. She has an elder brother named Egor who is also a Greco-Roman wrestler.

Her grandmother introduced 6-year-old Kanaeva to rhythmic gymnastics. Her first trainer, Yelena Arais, was the daughter of Kanaeva's later trainer, Vera Shtelbaums. Shtelbaums, who worked in the same gymnastics school, recalled Kanaeva spending long hours practicing even though all other students were gone, while her grandmother stood in the corridor waiting to take her home.

== Career ==
=== Senior debut ===
After the Olympic Games 2004, at which Kabaeva and Tchachina won the gold and silver medals respectively, Kabayeva remained competitive while Vera Sessina and Olga Kapranova rose to become Russia's new leading rhythmic gymnasts. Kanaeva made her senior international debut in 2006 at the International Tournament Schmiden where she won gold in all-around and event finals. She competed at the World Cup stage in Mie competing in clubs and ribbon where she finished 5th.

In summer 2007, Kanaeva competed in World Cup in Corbeil-Essonnes winning the all-around gold medal. She also won gold in hoop, rope and ribbon final defeating Anna Bessonova. She then competed at the World Cup series in Ljubljana where she won bronze in all-around, rope and silver in clubs. At the 2007 European Championships in Baku, Azerbaijan, Kabaeva, Sessina, and Kapranova were chosen to represent Russia. However, on the eve of the competition, Kabaeva withdrew because of an injury. Viner selected Kanaeva from the reserve team as the replacement. Despite the short notice, Kanaeva impressed by winning gold medals in both the individual ribbon and team competition. A few months later, she won another gold medal in the team competition at the World Championship in Patras, Greece.

=== 2008 Olympics season ===
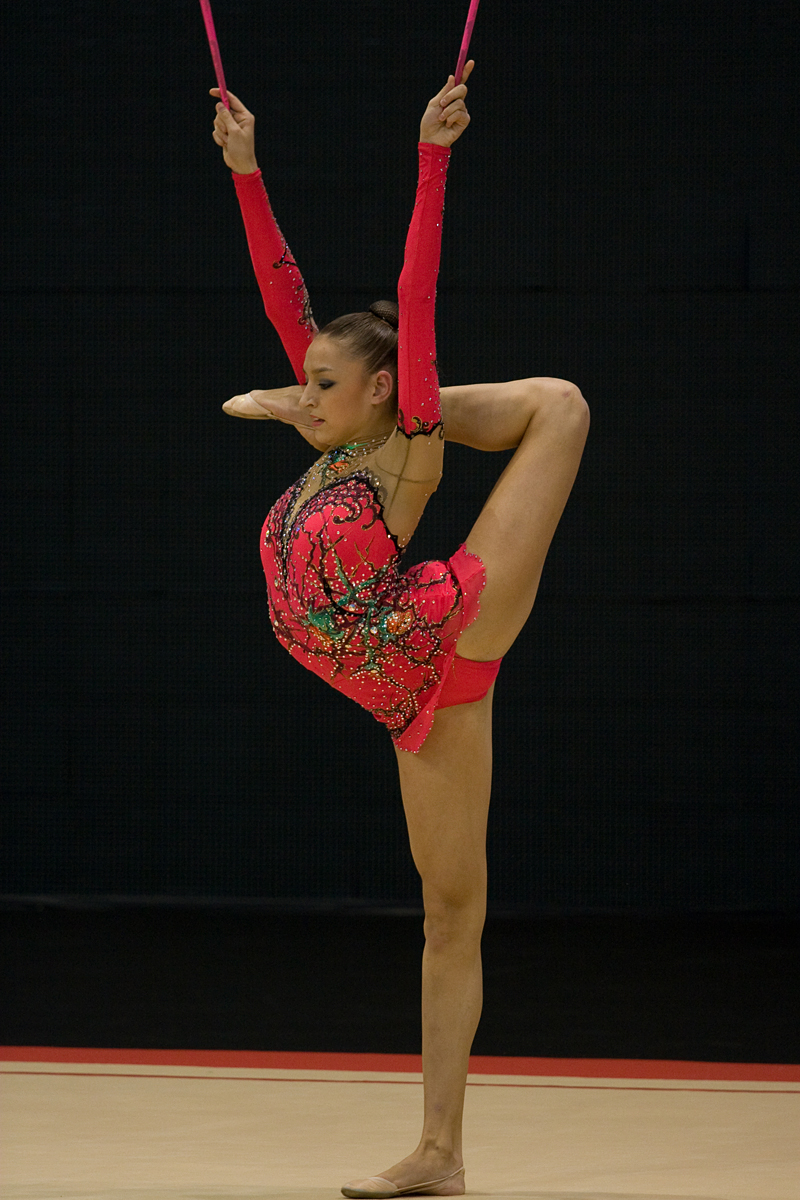
Kanayeva in 2008 performing her clubs routine in a middle of a rotation.

In preparation for 2008 Beijing Olympic Games qualification, Kanaeva's routines (hoop, clubs, rope and ribbon) were designed with high difficulties and her music was selected to bring out her uniqueness, one of which was her ribbon routine performed with the special edited piano version of 'Moscow Nights (Подмосковные вечера)'.

In the beginning of 2008 season, Kanaeva still faced tough competition from veteran teammates Vera Sessina, Olga Kapranova and Ukrainian rhythmic gymnast, the then-World Champion, Anna Bessonova. However, by mid-spring, Kanaeva began to establish herself by winning all the individual all-around titles in the Grand Prix and World Cup series, as well as the Russian National Championship. She defeated Bessonova and Kapranova with high scores in all her routines (18.875 in rope, 18.925 in hoop, 18.875 in ribbon and scored a 19.050 in clubs). At the 2008 European Championships she became the All-around champion. Viner selected Kanaeva and Kapranova as Russia's entries for the Olympic rhythmic gymnastics competition.

Kanaeva was the youngest among all the finalists in the Olympic rhythmic gymnastics competition. In her words, the Olympic Games were "different from all other competitions. You just have to concentrate on yourself, the apparatus and the carpet. You should not pay attention on anything else. I persuaded myself that everything would be alright, that I should not worry." Kanaeva won the Olympic title with a score of 75.50, ahead of second place Inna Zhukova of Belarus by a margin of 3.50 points.

=== 2009 season ===
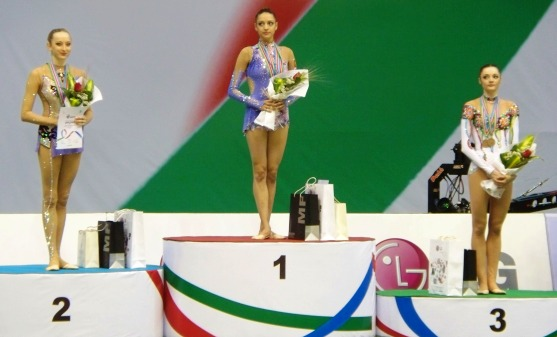
Kanaeva, all-around gold medalist at the 2009 European Championships.

Kanaeva's style changed drastically in 2009, causing her to struggle with injury and exhaustion. Nevertheless, Kanaeva won gold medals in all four apparatuses at the 2009 European Championships in May. Then, in July, she collected all nine gold medals at the Universiade and the World Games. Her five gold medals in the Universiade enabled Russia to come first in the overall team ranking. Russian President Dmitry Medvedev openly complimented Kanaeva's contribution. She was also hailed as the "Heroine of the Games" by the official website of Universiade Belgrade 2009.

In September, Kanaeva competed at the World Championships in Mie Prefecture, Japan. Kanaeva qualified for the individual all-around final by placing first in every single apparatus, each with a gold medal. Her results in individual apparatuses (along with those of her teammates Olga Kapranova, Daria Kondakova, and Daria Dmitrieva) helped win the team gold for Russia. In the individual all-around final, Kanaeva won her sixth gold medal by a margin of 0.600, beating by one the record set by Russian gymnast Oxana Kostina in 1992 of most gold medals won in a single rhythmic gymnastics World Championship. President Medvedev again acknowledged Kanaeva's new record by sending her a telegram of congratulations.

=== 2010 & 2011 seasons ===
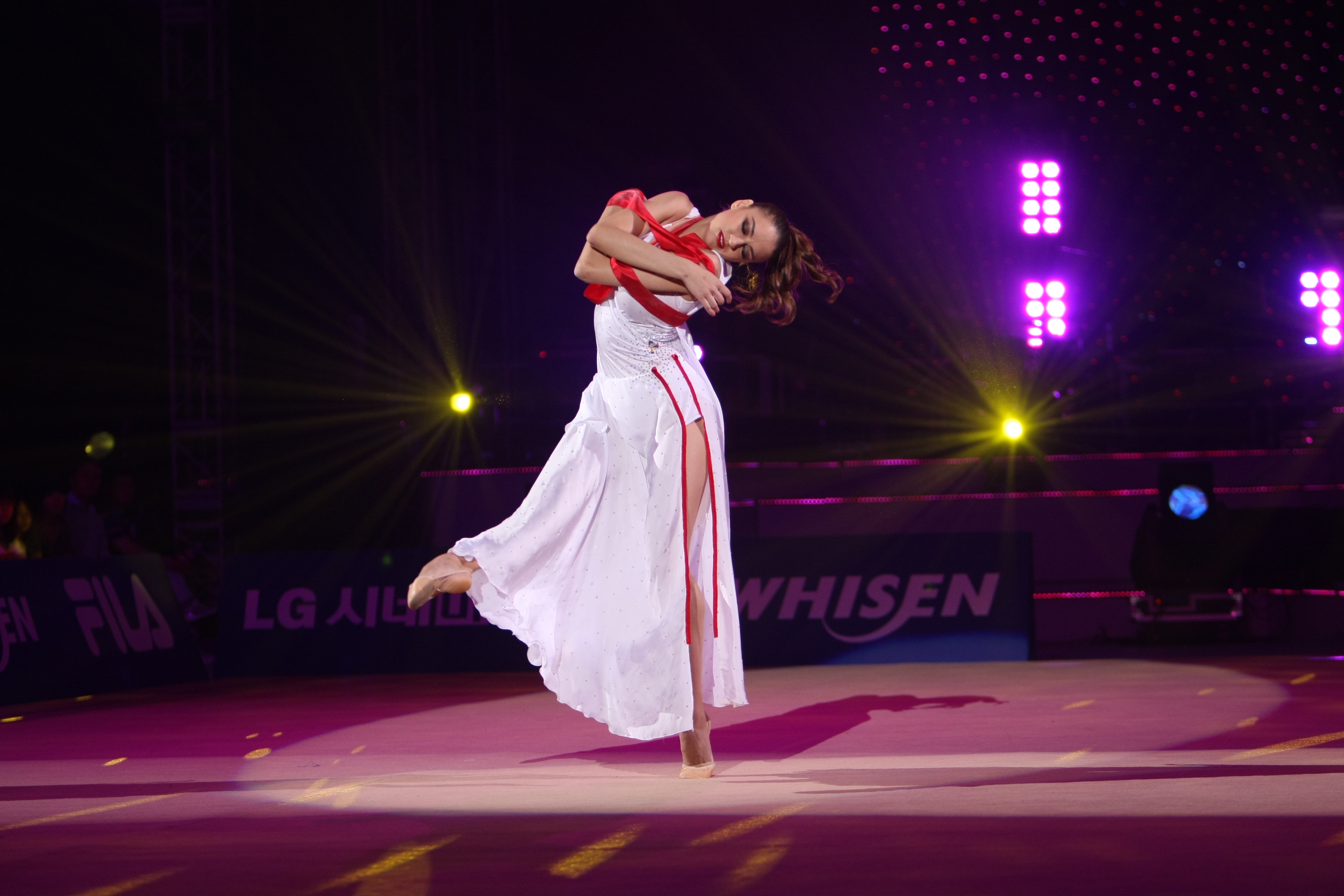
Kanaeva at the 2011 LG WHISEN Rhythmic All Stars Gala doing Freehand.

In 2010, Kanaeva had an undefeated all-around season winning the gold medals in all-around and event finals at the Grand Prix Final, she repeated as the 2010 European all-around champion ahead of teammate Daria Kondakova. At the 2010 World Championships, she won gold in the all-around, ball, hoop and silver in rope behind teammate Daria Kondakova.

Kanaeva started her 2011 season competing at the 2011 Moscow Grand Prix where she won gold in all-around and all event finals, she won silver in all-around at the Pesaro World Cup behind teammate Daria Kondakova nevertheless, she won all her other World Cup and Grand Prix series all-around competitions. She competed at the 2011 European Championships where she won gold in hoop, ball and a silver medal in ribbon behind Belarusian gymnast Liubov Charkashyna. In the 2011 World Championships, Kanaeva broke her record by again winning 6 gold medals in a single World Championship, the all-around, event finals (hoop, ball, clubs, ribbon) and team event. At the 2011 Grand Prix Final in Brno, Kanaeva won gold in all-around and all event finals where she scored a perfect 30 in ribbon under the 30-point judging system. She finished her season winning the all-around at the 2011 Aeon Cup in Japan. She ranked 5th in the world ranking 2011 season, dropped from the 1st in 2010 season due to she didn't take part in many competition in the 2011 season. However, she ranked the 1st again in the 2012 season.

=== 2012 Olympics season ===
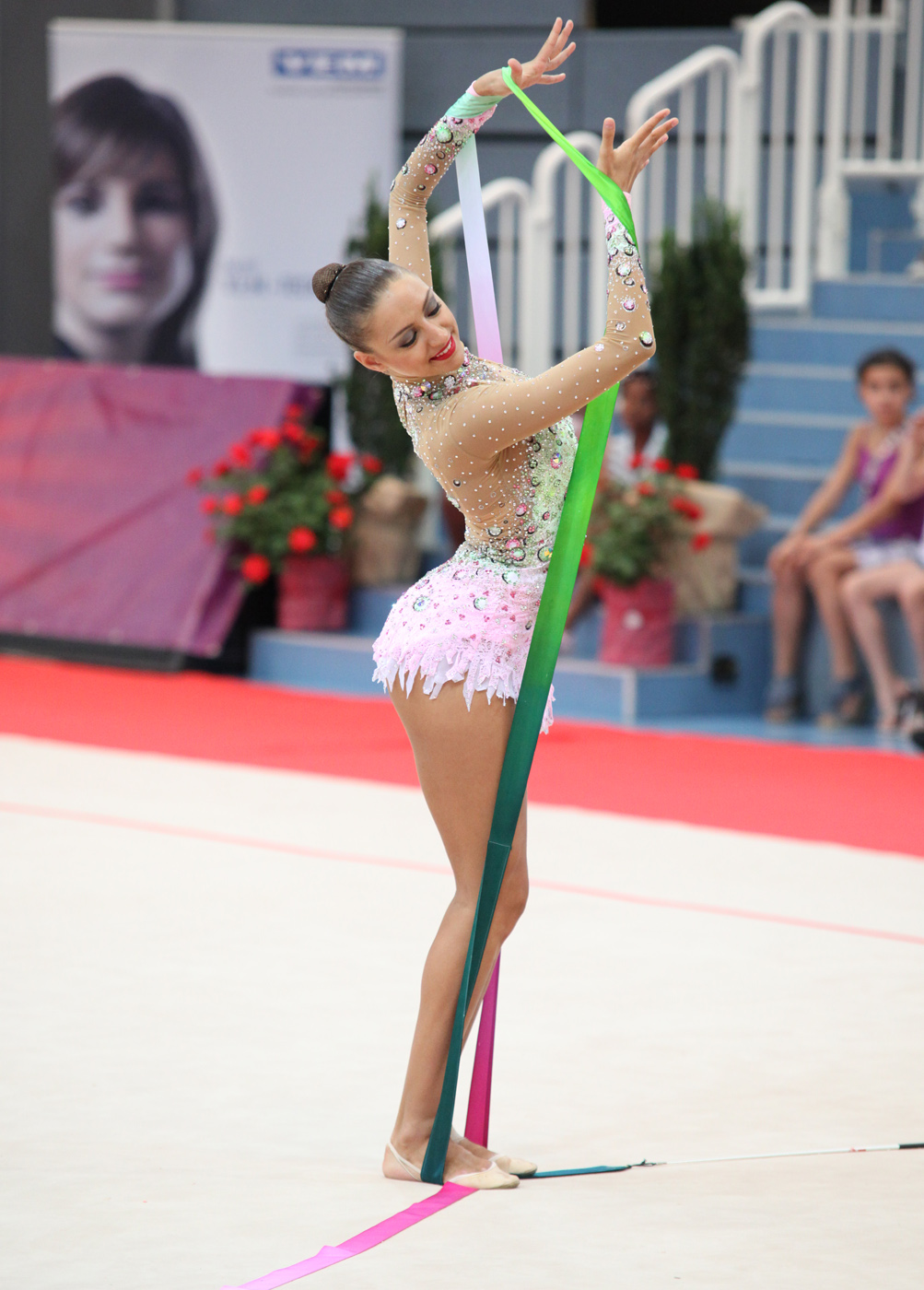
Kanaeva in 2012, in her starting position for ribbon, with the routine music being Frédéric Chopin’s “Fantasie Impromptu”.

Kanaeva started her season with new hoop, clubs and ball routines at the Moscow Grand Prix. She finished 2nd in the all-around at the 2012 Moscow Grand Prix behind teammate Daria Kondakova, but won gold medals in the ribbon, clubs and hoop finals ahead of Daria Dmitrieva and Daria Kondakova. She followed her win at the Grand Prix by winning the all-around at the International Thiais Tournament. She went on to compete on her first World Cup of the season at Pesaro and won the all-around title as well the clubs, ball and hoop finals. She withdrew from Penza World Cup citing illness. She returned to competition at the Sofia World Cup where she beat the defending champion Daria Kondakova and won the event finals in ball and hoop. She did not qualify for the ribbon finals because of the two-per-country rule, with Kondakova and Dmitrieva ahead of her in the ribbon qualifications. She was also the champion in all-around at the 2012 Corbeil-Essonnes Cup ahead of compatriots Daria Dmitrieva and Alexandra Merkulova.

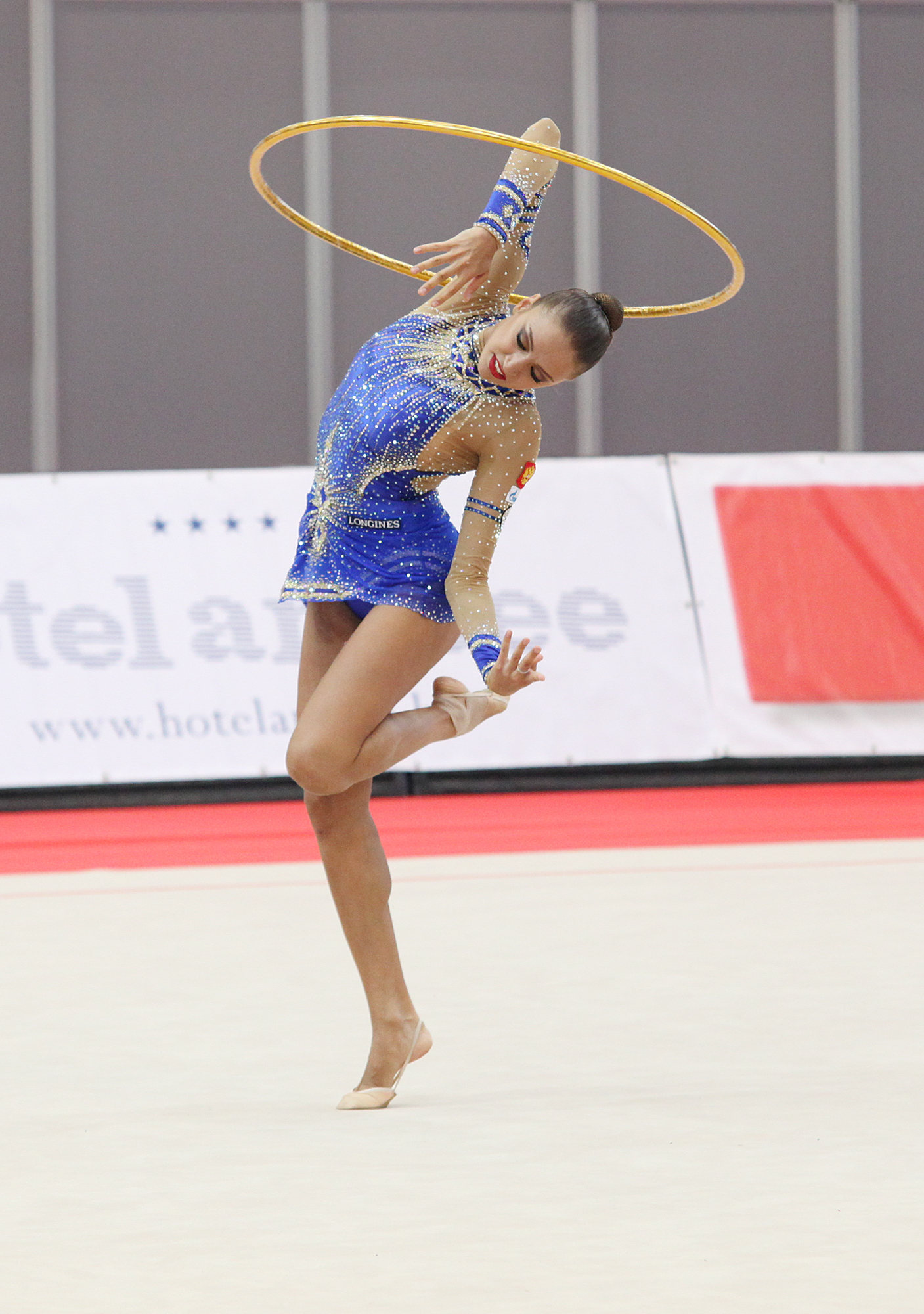
Kanaeva performing her hoop routine at the Grand Prix Rhythmic Gymnastics in Austria (2012)

At the 2012 European Championships, Kanaeva won her third consecutive European All-around title and posted a score of 29.700 in her ball routine. In an interview after the event, she said: "This victory didn't come easy. In the future I have to put effort on executing elements stronger and more precisely. My coaches are satisfied, and it's very important. I don't live by victory but by what I do." Kanaeva then competed at the Grand Prix Vorarlberg in Austria, where she won gold medals in the all-around and all the apparatus finals. At the World Cup series in Minsk, Kanaeva won the gold medal in all-around ahead of teammate Daria Dmitrieva (silver) and Belarusian Liubov Charkashyna (bronze). Kanaeva also won all the gold medals (Ball, Hoop, Clubs and Ribbon) at the event finals.

"Gymnastics has been part of my life since I was six years old. Since that time I have practiced every day, eight hours a day so I'm delighted to have won golds at two Olympics, It was not my target to be a legend but I do like the sound of it. I love gymnastics and I want the audience to remember me."

— Kanaeva quoted with Reuters, 11 August 2012

In the qualifications at the 2012 Olympics, Kanaeva ranked 2nd on the first day, behind teammate Daria Dmitrieva, after an unusual errant of fumbling her hoop routine. On the second day, she moved ahead of Dmitrieva with a total score of 116.000 points.

She was the only gymnast to score more than 29 points in the ball, hoop and clubs, falling short of that mark only with the ribbon that scored 28.900. Kanaeva finished with a total of 116.900 points, ahead of teammate Daria Dmitrieva who scored a total of 114.500 points.

=== Post-Olympics ===
Kanaeva did not continue training after the 2012 Olympics in London. In November 2012, Irina Viner commented about the possibility of Kanaeva's return to the national team, saying "We never discuss the timing of return with such great gymnasts...Any time when she recovers and decides to come back, it will be a great joy for us."

At a conference of the Russian Rhythmic Gymnastics Federation (RRGF) on 4 December 2012 in Novogorsk, Kanaeva announced the end of her competitive career, saying "Most probably, I have finished my career. There was a choice between labor in training and switching to another activity." At the same conference, it was announced that Kanaeva had been elected a vice-president of the RRGF, along with 2004 Olympic silver medalist Irina Tchachina. Kanaeva had expressed a desire to remain in rhythmic gymnastics indefinitely as a coach or in an administrative position. In June 2009, Shtelbaums stated that Kanaeva had the quality to become a good coach because of her attentiveness in instructing young female rhythmic gymnasts.

Kanaeva was ranked 1st as the most Successful Female Athlete of Russia in 2012 beating Aliya Mustafina (2nd) and Maria Sharapova (3rd) for the top ranking. The overall rating was formed in the basis of the greatest number of votes of experts. Also, the maximum figures for the number of references in the paper and press the number of requests in the Russian segment of the Internet for a year.

In September 2013, Kanaeva was named "Woman of the year" by GQ Russia magazine. The award ceremony was held in Mayakovsky Theatre in Moscow.

On 15 February 2015, a gala was held in Russia for the 80th founding anniversary of Rhythmic Gymnastics. The venue was held in the historical Mariinsky Theatre in St. Petersburg. Among those who performed at the gala were Russian former Olympic champions, Olympic medalists and World champions including: Kanaeva, Yulia Barsukova, Irina Tchachina, Daria Dmitrieva, and Yana Batyrshina.

== Endorsements ==
Kanaeva became the ambassador for luxury watches house Longines in 2009–2012. She was one of the chosen recipient of the Visa Sponsorship for the 2012 London Olympics. Kanaeva was also one of the nine elite athletes chosen to be the ambassador for Pantene for the Olympic Games. She has appeared in a commercial video for Pantene Pro-V.

Kanaeva was one of the 50 elite athletes of Russia chosen as an honorary ambassador for the 2013 Summer Universiade in Kazan.

== Personal life ==
Kanaeva was enrolled at the Siberian State University of Physical Training and Sports. Kanaeva has expressed an interest in learning to draw and play the piano after her sporting career. She is also keen on studying foreign languages and computer-related subjects. According to her mother, Kanaeva saves her prize money for future education.

Kanaeva has stated that if she wasn’t a gymnast, she would take up professional dance.

On 8 June 2013, Kanaeva married ice hockey player Igor Musatov who plays for the HC Slovan Bratislava of the Kontinental Hockey League (KHL). In August, Irina Viner announced Kanaeva was pregnant. However, the pair have since divorced in 2018.

On 8 October 2013, Kanaeva's father Oleg died of a heart attack on a plane during a flight from Turkey to Moscow while returning from the World Cup Championships of Greco-Roman wrestling.

On 19 March 2014, Kanaeva gave birth to the couple's first child, a boy named Vladimir.

As of February 2020, Kanaeva has been working as a coach for The Junior Russian Gymnastics Team. She now coaches Sofya Agafonova, a junior member of the Russian National Team, and also, together with Vera Shtelbaums to Anastasia Simakova, 2019 junior world champion in rope and team.

== Eponymous skills ==
Kanaeva has one eponymous skill listed in the code of points, a 180 degree turn on the stomach with the gymnast's legs held in a split position with no hand or arm assistance.

Name	Description	Difficulty (Note: Valid for the 2022-2024 Code of Points)
Kanaeva	Rotation 180 on the chest, legs in split position without help	0.4 base value

== Routine music information ==
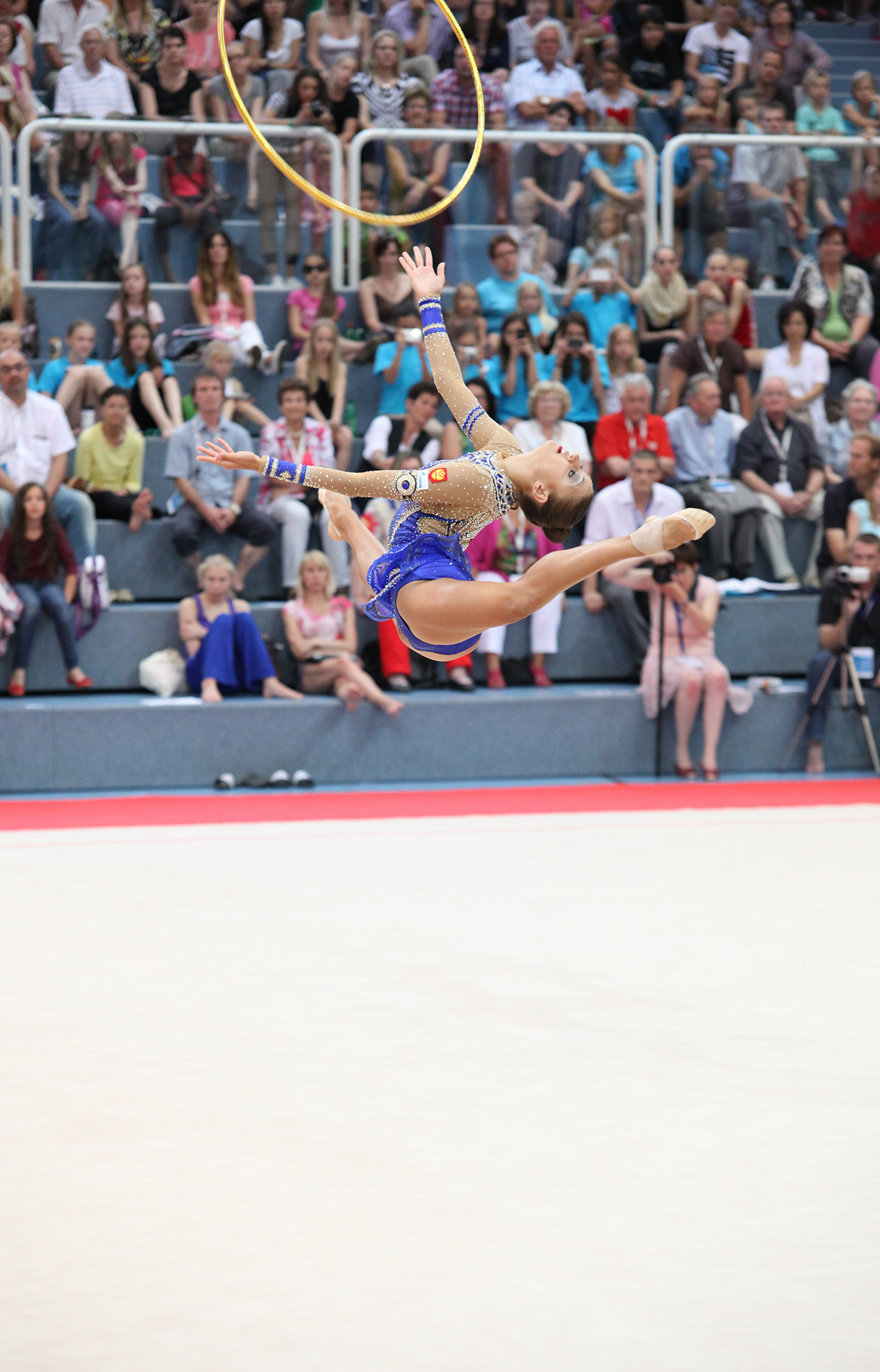
Kanaeva performing her hoop routine at the 2012 Vorarlberg Grand Prix that scored a perfect 30 points.

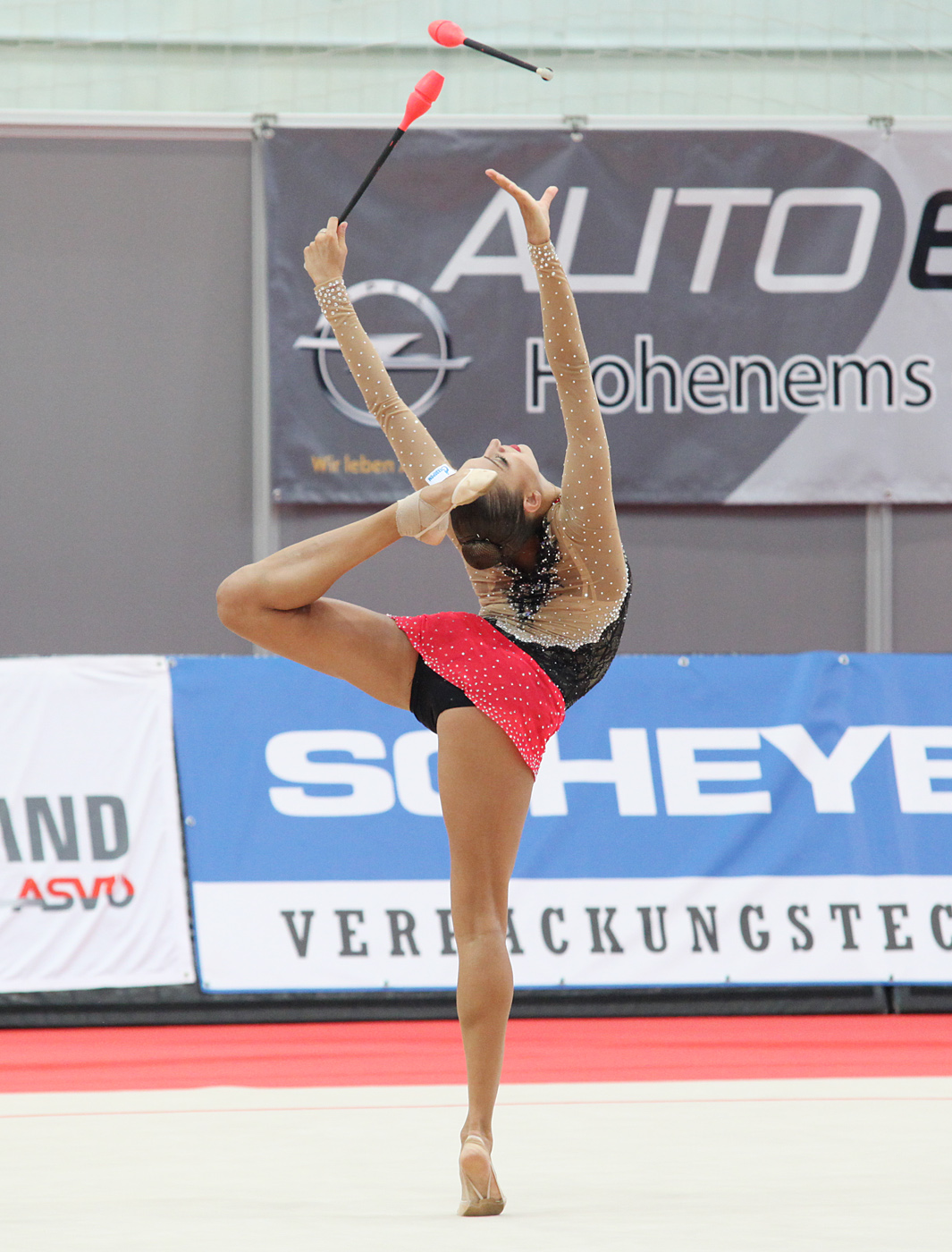
Kanaeva performing with clubs

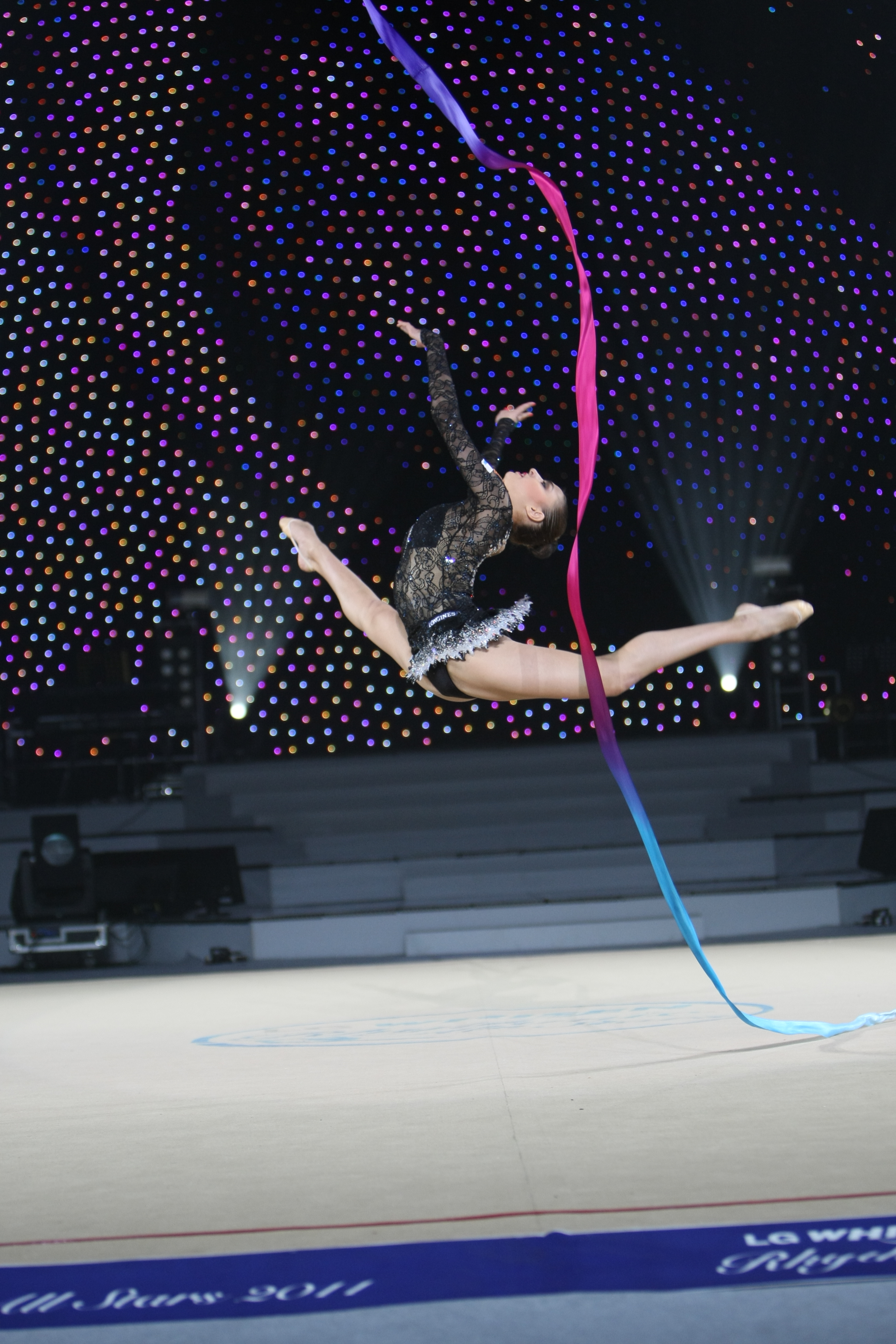
Kanaeva at the 2011 LG WHISEN Rhythmic All Stars Gala.

Year	Apparatus	Music title
2012	Hoop (third)	"The Rite of Spring", by Igor Stravinsky
2012	Hoop (second)	"Egypt Is Yours For Only One Day" (Cleopatra OST), "To Speed You on Your Way", "In The Eyes of the Gods We Are One" by Trevor Jones
2012	Hoop (first)	"Liebestraum", by Franz Liszt
2012	Ball (second)	"Concerto (Ballet)" (Les Demoiselles de Rochefort OST), by Michel Legrand
2012	Ball (first)	Sleuth OST by Patrick Doyle
2012	Clubs	"Poeta (remix)", original by Vicente Amigo, remix by Maxime Rodriguez
2012	Ribbon	"Fantasie Impromptu", by Frédéric Chopin
2012	Gala at EC Nizhny Novgorod	"L-O-V-E", by Nat King Cole (performed by Joss Stone)
2011	Hoop	"L'Ete Indien", by Joe Dassin
2011	Ball (second)	"Elegy in E-Flat Minor", by Sergey Rachmaninov
2011	Ball (first)	"Picture of Dorian Gray", by Charlie Mole; "Catch the Falling Sky", by Immediate Music
2011	Clubs	"Bolero", by Maurice Ravel
2011	Ribbon	"Fantasie Impromptu", by Frédéric Chopin
2011	Gala at EC Minsk	"You Lost Me", by Christina Aguilera
2010	Rope (second)	Smuglyanka Moldovanka
2010	Rope (first)	"Pigalle (Interlude)", by Patricia Kaas
2010	Hoop	"The Rite of Spring", by Igor Stravinsky
2010	Ball	"Mix of Loss and Decision", by Zbigniew Preisner
2010	Ribbon	"Tango", by Denis SungHô, Soledad Group
2010	Gala at GP Thiais	"Notre Dame de Paris" (musical)
2010	Gala at EC Bremen	"Oblivion", by Astor Piazzolla
2010	Gala at WCH Moscow	"Who Wants to Live Forever", by Queen, Sarah Brightman version
2009	Rope (second)	"Kadril Veselaya", by Svetoch
2009	Rope (first)	"Carmen Suite", Rodion Shchedrin
2009	Hoop	"Fantasia on Russian Folksongs", by Anton Arensky
2009	Ball (second)	"Concierto de Aranjuez", by Joaquín Rodrigo
2009	Ball (first)	Spartacus, by Aram Khachaturian
2009	Ribbon	"Padam Padam", by Edith Piaf
2009	Gala-Autumn	"You are in My September", by Igor Krutoy
2009	Gala (WCH Mie)	Basement Jaxx
2008	Rope	"El Conquistador", by Maxime Rodriguez
2008	Hoop	"Tristan & Iseult", by Maxime Rodriguez
2008	Clubs	"Jota Aragonesa", by Glinka
2008	Clubs at LA Lights	(same music as CariPrato 2007)
2008	Ribbon	"Moscow Nights", by Igor Krutoy, composed by Vasily Solovyov-Sedoi
2008	Gala-2 Ribbons	"Kadril Veselaya", by Svetoch
2008	Gala-Autum	"You are in My September", by Igor Krotoy
2007	Rope	Ivan Petrovich Larionov
2007	Hoop	"La forza del destino", by Giuseppe Verdi, composed by Pompon Finkelstein
2007	Clubs (second)	—
2007	Clubs (first)	"Act 1 Largo al factotum", by Gioachino Rossini
2007	Ribbon	"Walls of Akendora", by Keiko Matsui
2007	Gala (CariPrato with Ermakova)	"Song #1", by Serebro
2007	Gala-2 Ribbons (WCH Patras)	"Kadril Veselaya", by Svetoch
2006	Rope	"Playing Marilyin Monroe", by Oleg Kostrow
2006	Ball (second)	"Moonlight Rumba", by Gustavo Montesano
2006	Ball (first)	"Earthsong", by Karunesh
2006	Clubs	—
2006	Ribbon	"Walls of Akendora", by Keiko Matsui
2006	Gala-free hand	"Earthsong", by Karunesh
2005	Rope	"Laissez Moi Me Griser", by Maurice El Mediouni
2005	Hoop	"Big Drum, Small World", by Dhol Foundation
2005	Clubs	"Animals", by X-Mode
2005	Ribbon	"Besame Mucho", by Gadjo
2004	Rope	"Black Cat, White Cat", by Goran Bregovic
2004	Ball	PC Game Pharaoh OST, mix of jakb+jrj-Hb-sd
2004	Clubs	"Hey Pachuco" (The Mask OST), by Royal Crown Revue
2004	Clubs (Aeon Cup)	—
2004	Ribbon	"Besame Mucho", by Gadjo
2003	Rope	"Black Cat, White Cat", by Goran Bregovic
2003	Ball	—
2003	Clubs	—
2003	Ribbon	"I Wanna Be Like You", by Big Bad Voodoo Daddy

== Competitive highlights ==
(Team competitions in seniors are held only at the World Championships, Europeans and other Continental Games.)

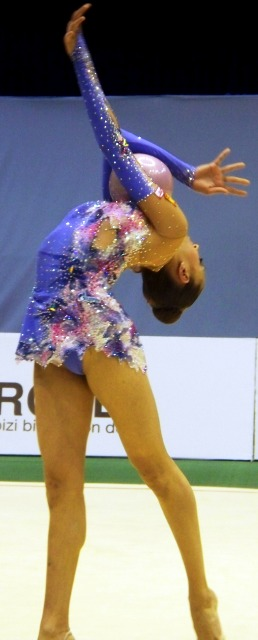
Kanaeva at the 2009 European Championships

International: Senior 2011–2012 Season
Year	Event	AA	Team	Hoop	Ball	Clubs	Ribbon
2012	Olympic Games	1st					
2012	World Cup series: Minsk	1st		1st	1st	1st	1st
2012	Grand Prix Vorarlberg	1st		1st	1st	1st	2nd
2012	European Championships	1st	NT				
2012	World Cup Corbeil-Essonnes	1st		1st	1st	2nd	3rd (Q)
2012	World Cup Sofia	1st		3rd(Q)	1st	1st	1st
2012	World Cup Pesaro	1st		1st	1st	1st	3rd (Q)
2012	Grand Prix Thiais	1st		3rd	1st	1st	1st
2012	Baltic Hoop	1st		2nd	1st	1st	1st
2012	Grand Prix Moscow	2nd		1st	3rd(Q)	1st	1st
2011	Aeon Cup	1st	1st				
2011	Grand Prix Final: Brno	1st		1st	1st	1st	1st
2011	World Championships	1st	1st	1st	1st	1st	1st
2011	Grand Prix Berlin Masters	1st		1st	1st	1st	1st
2011	Summer Universiade	1st		1st	1st	1st	2nd
2011	International Tournament of Prato	1st	1st	1st	1st	1st	1st
2011	European Championships		1st	1st	1st	6th	2nd
2011	World Cup Corbeil-Essonnes	1st		1st	1st	1st	1st
2011	World Cup Portimao	2nd		1st	1st	5th (Q)	3rd (Q)
2011	Grand Prix Thiais	1st		1st	1st	1st	1st
2011	World Cup Pesaro	1st		1st	1st	5th	2nd
2011	Grand Prix Holon	1st		1st	5th (Q)	1st	1st
2011	Grand Prix Moscow	1st		1st	1st	1st	1st
International: Senior 2009–2010 Season
Year	Event	AA	Team	Rope	Hoop	Ball	Ribbon
2010	Grand Prix Final: Berlin Masters	1st		1st	1st	1st	1st
2010	Grand Prix Brno	1st		1st	1st	1st	3rd (Q)
2010	Aeon Cup	1st	1st				
2010	World Championships	1st	1st	2nd	1st	1st	3rd (Q)
2010	Grand Prix Holon	1st		1st	1st	1st	1st
2010	World Cup series: Pesaro	1st		1st	1st	1st	1st
2010	International Tournament of Prato	1st	1st	1st	1st	1st	1st
2010	Grand Prix Innsbruck	1st		1st	1st	3rd (Q)	1st
2010	World Cup Minsk	1st		1st	1st	1st	1st
2010	Grand Prix Marbella	1st		1st	1st	1st	1st
2010	European Championships	1st	NT				
2010	World Cup St. Petersburg	1st		1st	1st	1st	1st
2010	Grand Prix Thiais	1st		1st	1st	1st	1st
2010	World Cup Portimao	1st		1st	3rd (Q)	1st	1st
2010	World Cup Debrechen	1st		1st	1st	1st	1st
2010	Grand Prix Moscow	1st		2nd	1st	1st	2nd
2010	World Cup Montreal	1st		3rd	2nd	1st	1st
2009	Grand Prix Final: Berlin Masters	1st		1st	1st	1st	1st
2009	World Championships	1st	1st	1st	1st	1st	1st
2009	World Cup series: Minsk	1st		1st	1st	1st	1st
2009	World Games			1st	1st	1st	1st
2009	Summer Universiade	1st		1st	1st	1st	1st
2009	International Tournament of Prato	1st		1st	1st	1st	1st
2009	Grand Prix Marbella	1st		1st	1st	1st	1st
2009	European Championships		1st	1st	1st	1st	1st
2009	World Cup Pesaro	1st		1st	1st	1st	2nd
2009	Grand Prix Holon	1st		1st	1st	1st	1st
2009	World Cup Portimao	1st		1st	2nd	1st	1st
2009	World Cup St. Petersburg	1st		1st	1st	1st	2nd
2009	Grand Prix Thiais	1st		1st	1st	1st	2nd
2009	Grand Prix Brno	1st		2nd	1st	1st	1st
2009	World Cup Budapest	1st		1st	1st	1st	2nd
2009	Grand Prix Moscow	1st		1st	1st	1st	1st
International: Senior 2007–2008 Season
Year	Event	AA	Team	Rope	Hoop	Clubs	Ribbon
2008	Aeon Cup	1st	1st				
2008	World Cup Final: Benidorm			4th	1st	1st	1st
2008	Olympic Games	1st					
2008	World Cup Irkutsk	1st		1st	1st	1st	1st
2008	World Cup Astana	1st		2nd	1st	1st	2nd
2008	European Championships	1st	NT				
2008	World Cup Corbeil-Essonnes	1st		1st	1st	1st	2nd
2008	Grand Prix Marbella	1st		1st	6th	3rd	1st
2008	World Cup Portimao	1st		1st	1st	1st	1st
2008	World Cup Maribor	1st		1st	2nd	1st	1st
2008	Grand Prix Thiais	1st		1st	1st	1st	1st
2008	MTM Ljubljana	1st		1st	1st	1st	1st
2008	World Cup Kyiv	4th		3rd	3rd	2nd	
2008	Grand Prix Moscow	3rd		2nd		2nd	
2008	L.A. Lights	2nd					
2007	World Championships		1st				4th (Q)
2007	IT Finland	1st		1st	1st	1st	1st
2007	World Cup series: Ljubljana	3rd		3rd		2nd	
2007	Black Sea Games	1st		1st	1st	1st	1st
2007	European Championships		1st				1st
2007	International Tournament of Prato	1st		1st	1st	1st	1st
2007	World Cup Corbeil-Essonnes	1st		1st	1st	5th	1st
2007	World Cup Kyiv	3rd		4th	4th	5th (Q)	2nd
International: Senior 2005–2006 Season
Year	Event	AA	Team	Ribbon	Rope	Ball	Clubs
2006	World Cup Final: Mie			5th			5th
2006	World Cup Portimao	6th		2nd	6th		1st
2006	International Tournament of Prato	1st		1st	1st	1st	1st
2006	World Cup Corbeil-Essonnes	4th		2nd	4th	1st	4th
2006	International Tournament Schmiden	1st		1st	1st	1st	1st
2005	International Tournament of Prato	1st		1st	1st	1st	1st
International: Junior
Year	Event	AA	Team	Ball	Ribbon	Rope	Clubs
2005	Aeon Cup	1st	1st				
2004	Aeon Cup	1st	1st				
2004	International Tournament of Prato	1st	1st	1st	1st	1st	1st
2004	Junior Grand Prix Thiais	1st		1st	1st	1st	1st
2003	Aeon Cup	1st	1st				
2003	International Tournament of Prato	1st	1st	1st	1st	1st	1st
2003	International Tournament Calais	1st		1st	1st	1st	1st
Q = Qualifications (Did not advance to Event Final due to the 2 gymnast per country rule); WD = Withdrew; NT = No Team Competition held

== Detailed Olympic results ==
Year	Competition Description	Location	Music	Apparatus	Rank-Final	Score-Final	Rank-Qualifying	Score-Qualifying
2012	Olympics	London		All-around	1st	116.900	1st	116.000
2012	Olympics	London	"Concerto (Ballet)" (Les Demoiselles de Rochefort OST) by Michel Legrand	Ball	1st	29.200	1st	29.525
2012	Olympics	London	"Fantasie Impromptu No 66" by Frédéric Chopin	Ribbon	2nd	28.900	1st	29.400
2012	Olympics	London	"The Rite of Spring" by Igor Stravinsky	Hoop	1st	29.350	2nd	28.100
2012	Olympics	London	"Poeta (remix)" original by Vincente Amigo remix by Maxime Rodriguez	Clubs	1st	29.450	1st	28.975

Year	Competition Description	Location	Music	Apparatus	Rank-Final	Score-Final	Rank-Qualifying	Score-Qualifying
2008	Olympics	Beijing		All-around	1st	75.500	1st	74.075
2008	Olympics	Beijing	Moscow Nights by Vasily Solovyov-Sedoi	Ribbon	1st	18.850	1st	18.825
2008	Olympics	Beijing	"El Conquistador" by Maxime Rodriguez	Rope	1st	18.850	4th	17.850
2008	Olympics	Beijing	Tristan & Iseult by Maxime Rodriguez	Hoop	1st	18.850	1st	18.700
2008	Olympics	Beijing	"Jota Aragonesa" by Glinka	Clubs	1st	18.950	1st	18.700

Achievements
Preceded by (Russia) Alina Kabaeva	Olympic Champion Rhythmic Gymnastic All-Around; 2008, 2012	Succeeded by (Russia) Margarita Mamun
Preceded by (Russia)	World Champion Rhythmic Gymnastic Team; 2009–2011	Succeeded by (Russia)
Preceded by (Ukraine) Anna Bessonova	World Champion Rhythmic Gymnastic All-Around; 2009–2011	Succeeded by (Russia) Yana Kudryavtseva
Preceded by (Russia) Vera Sessina	World Champion Rhythmic Gymnastic Rope; 2009	Succeeded by (Russia) Daria Kondakova
Preceded by (Russia) Olga Kapranova	World Champion Rhythmic Gymnastic Hoop; 2009–2011	Succeeded by (Ukraine) Ganna Rizatdinova
Preceded by (Russia) Olga Kapranova	World Champion Rhythmic Gymnastic Ball; 2009–2011	Succeeded by (Russia) Margarita Mamun
Preceded by (Russia) Olga Kapranova	World Champion Rhythmic Gymnastic Clubs; 2011	Succeeded by (Russia) Margarita Mamun, Yana Kudryavtseva
Preceded by (Russia) Daria Dmitrieva	World Champion Rhythmic Gymnastic Ribbon; 2009, 2011	Succeeded by (Russia) Yana Kudryavtseva
Preceded by (Russia) Vera Sessina	European Champion Rhythmic Gymnastic All-Around; 2008, 2010, 2012	Succeeded by (Russia) Yana Kudryavtseva
Preceded by (Russia)	European Champion Rhythmic Gymnastic Team; 2007, 2009, 2011	Succeeded by (Russia)
Preceded by (Azerbaijan) Aliya Garayeva	European Champion Rhythmic Gymnastic Rope; 2009	Succeeded by Incumbent
Preceded by (Russia) Olga Kapranova	European Champion Rhythmic Gymnastic Hoop; 2009, 2011	Succeeded by (Russia) Daria Svatkovskaya
Preceded by (Russia) Olga Kapranova	European Champion Rhythmic Gymnastic Ball; 2009	Succeeded by (Belarus) Liubov Charkashyna
Preceded by (Ukraine) Natalia Godunko	European Champion Rhythmic Gymnastic Ribbon; 2007, 2009, 2011	Succeeded by (Russia) Margarita Mamun
