= Douglas Fordyce =

British acrobatic gymnast (born 1990)

- Nickname: Doug
- Born: 3 February 1990 (age 36)

Gymnastics career
- Discipline: Acrobatic gymnastics
- Country represented: United Kingdom
- Club: Heathrow Gymnastics Club
- Head coach: Neil Griffiths
- Assistant coach: Andrew Griffiths
- Choreographer: Nicola Yellop
Medal record
Men's acrobatic gymnastics
Representing Great Britain
World Championships
Gold medal – first place	2010 Wrocław	Men's Pairs

Douglas Fordyce (born 3 February 1990), known usually as Doug Fordyce, is a British acrobatic gymnast who won the title of world men's pairs champion with Edward Upcott in July 2010 in Poland.

Until 2012, Fordyce was a member of Spelbound, the gymnastic group who rose to fame in 2010, winning the fourth series of Britain's Got Talent. The prize was £100,000 and the opportunity to appear at the 2010 Royal Variety Performance. Having retired from Spelbound, Fordyce and Upcott are pursuing a stage act route together called Brothers of Eden.

In 2014, Fordyce took part in the BBC series Tumble as an acrobatic professional and was paired with Amelle Berrabah. In 2021 he appeared in the BBC soap opera EastEnders playing a character who is beaten up for being homophobic and ableist.
