= Jonathan Stranks =

British acrobatic gymnast (born 1994)

- Nickname: Jonny
- Born: 16 December 1994 (age 31)
- Height: 1.60 m (5 ft 3 in)

Gymnastics career
- Country represented: United Kingdom
- Club: Heathrow Gymnastics Club
- Head coach: Neil Griffiths
- Assistant coach: Andrew Griffiths
- Choreographer: Nicola Yellop
Medal record
Men's acrobatic gymnastics
Representing Great Britain
World Championships
Gold medal – first place	2010 Wrocław	Men's Fours

Jonathan Stranks (born 16 December 1994) is a British acrobatic gymnast who won the title of world men's fours champion with Adam Buckingham, Adam McAssey and Alex Uttley in July 2010 in Poland.

Stranks was a member of Spelbound, the gymnastic group who rose to fame in 2010, winning the fourth series of Britain's Got Talent. The prize was £100,000 and the opportunity to appear at the 2010 Royal Variety Performance.

After leaving Spelbound, Stranks joined Cirque du Soleil's show Quidam until the show retired in 2016.
