= Paul Burling =

British impressionist

- Born: 21 May 1969 (age 57); Hertfordshire, England
- Notable work: Britain's Got Talent
- Spouse: Married

Comedy career
- Years active: 1985–2003; 2010–present
- Medium: Stand-up
- Genre: Impressions

Paul Burling (born 21 May 1969) is a British impressionist. A veteran of show business for 25 years, having worked in voiceover, radio and pantomime, he rose to national attention as a finalist of the fourth series of Britain's Got Talent finishing in fifth place. His debut television show in 2010, It's Paul Burling!, attracted a television audience of 3.7 million.

== Biographical details ==
Paul Burling was born in Hertfordshire; he now lives in Bristol and is a father of three.

== Career ==
In 2007, Burling auditioned for the inaugural first series of Britain's Got Talent, however his performance was never televised and he was cut in the Deliberations.

Burling "worked the holiday parks and comedy circuit for 25 years" before attracting nationwide attention on the fourth series of Britain's Got Talent in 2010. He has worked in voiceover, for radio and in pantomime before being given his own Christmas special show by ITV, a prime-time national television spot.

His role of Christmas 2010 in Jack and the Beanstalk, was his fifth pantomime season at the Central Theatre, Chatham. He has also played Wishee Washee in Aladdin and Smee in Peter Pan. In 2011 he co-starred with Gareth Gates in Aladdin at the Milton Keynes Theatre.

Burling has performed in pantomime with Strictly Come Dancing judge Craig Revel Horwood, in Southend, Dartford and High Wycomb, all with Qdos Pantomimes.

Burling's radio work includes BBC Radio Kent, BBC Radio Devon, BBC Radio Wales, Pulse FM and Ocean FM, and he is an experienced voiceover artist.

On Britain's Got Talent, Burling became particularly associated with his impression of television comic Harry Hill. His show for ITV, It's Paul Burling!, aired in December 2010 to a television audience of 3.7 million. His expanded portfolio included impressions and satires of Alan Carr, Graham Norton, Downton Abbey, Hercule Poirot, and The X Factor. Starring alongside Paul was actress and impressionist Jess Robinson, responsible for the female impressions on ITV's Headcases. Subsequently, the iPhone 3GS made an app called "Burling's Game Booth". Other TV work includes The Slammer for CBBC during 2011.

During 2015, Paul Burling toured with Joe Pasquale, visiting cities and towns throughout southern and eastern England.

In 2015 it was confirmed that Paul would be part of the new Butlins' pantomimes Aladdin Rocks, which was shown every week, and it carried on into the 2016 season at all three parks. Aladdin Rocks ended in January 2017. Burling did not return for Butlins' new pantomime, Whittington Rocks, in 2017, and instead went back to Qdos Pantomimes, starring in Peter Pan in Belfast.
