= Edward Upcott =

British acrobatic gymnast (born 1991)

- Born: Edward Robin Upcott; 29 December 1991 (age 34); Chertsey, Surrey, England
- Known for: Flyer for Spelbound; With Doug Fordyce, World Acrobatic gymnastics men's pairs champion 2010; 5 time British champion; With others, holder of Guinness World Record for Highest Throw and Catch of a Person

Edward Upcott
- Height: 1.52 m (5 ft 0 in)

Gymnastics career
- Discipline: Acrobatic gymnastics
- Country represented: United Kingdom; (2002–2012)
- Club: Spelthorne School of Gymnastics
- Gym: Spelthorne School of Gymnastics
- Head coach: Neil Griffiths
- Assistant coach: Andrew Griffiths
- Choreographer: Nicola Yellop
- Retired: 2012
Medal record
Men's acrobatic gymnastics
Representing Great Britain
World Championships
Bronze medal – third place	2008 Glasgow	Men's Pairs
Gold medal – first place	2010 Wrocław	Men's Pairs
Silver medal – second place	2012 Lake Buena Vista	Men's Pairs

Edward Robin Upcott (born 29 December 1991) is a five times British acrobatic gymnast champion who was world men's pairs champion in partnership with Doug Fordyce, winning the gold medal in July 2010 in Poland. Before his partnership with Fordyce, Upcott was in partnership with Mark Fyson, who retired in 2009 after the pair had won the bronze medal in the 2008 world championships in Glasgow. With his new partner Adam McAssey, Upcott was awarded the silver medal in the 2012 Acrobatic Gymnastics World Championships.

Upcott came to UK national public attention with his membership of the gymnastic group Spelbound, who rose to fame in 2010, winning the fourth series of Britain's Got Talent. Part of their performance was a spectacular throw of Upcott over the heads of the judges, catching him in the main performance area. The prize was £100,000 and the opportunity to appear at the 2010 Royal Variety Performance.

With Spelbound, Upcott holds the world record for 'Highest throw and catch of a person', where he was the person thrown and caught. The successful record attempt was televised on the UK children's TV show Blue Peter.

Upcott left Spelbound in 2012 to pursue other avenues. While still a member, he was cast as a stunt double for Asa Butterfield in Hugo. He works with Doug Fordyce as Brothers of Eden. His stated ambition is to be part of Cirque du Soleil.

== Personal life ==
Upcott was educated at The Magna Carta School in Surrey.

A long-term asthmatic, Upcott has learned how to control this such that it has no impact on his sporting endeavours. His official biography states that, as a child, he nearly died during his first asthma attack.

His younger siblings, Alice and Adam are also acrobatic gymnasts.
