= 2010 Acrobatic Gymnastics World Championships =

22nd Acrobatic Gymnastics World Championships
- Venue: Hala Orbita
- Location: Wrocław, Poland
- Start date: 16 April 2010
- End date: 18 April 2010
- Competitors: 39 from 6 nations

The 2010 Acrobatic Gymnastics World Championships was the 22nd edition of acrobatic gymnastics competition. It was held in Wrocław, Poland from 16 to 18 July 2010 at the Hala Orbita.

== Medal table ==
Rank	Nation	Gold	Silver	Bronze	Total
1	Great Britain (GBR)	2	1	0	3
2	Russia (RUS)	1	2	2	5
3	Ukraine (UKR)	1	0	1	2
4	United States (USA)	1	0	0	1
5	Belarus (BLR)	0	1	1	2
5	China (CHN)	0	1	1	2
Totals (6 entries)		5	5	5	15

== Results ==
=== Men's pair ===
Rank	Team	Country	Point
Gold medal	Edward Upcott, Douglas Fordyce	Great Britain	28.662
Silver medal	Konstantin Pilipchuk, Alexei Dudchenko	Russia	28.506
Bronze medal	Yauheni Kalachou, Ruslan Fedchanka	Belarus	28.052
4	Antoan Andonov, Yasen Georgiev	Bulgaria	27.400
5	Iaroslav Pulin, Dmytro Tarasenko	Ukraine	26.580
6	Yang Hengyi, Chen Hongen	China	26.317
7	Axl Osborne, Dylan Inserra	United States	26.250
8	Konstantin Averin, Petr Gmyzun	Kazakhstan	25.420

=== Women's pair ===
Rank	Team	Country	Point
Gold medal	Kateryna Sytnikova, Anastasiya Melnychenko	Ukraine	28.709
Silver medal	Alina Yushko, Katsiaryna Murashko	Belarus	28.502
Bronze medal	Anzhelika Pikhulina, Anastasia Sokolenko	Russia	28.001
4	Ayla Ahmadova, Dialara Sultanova	Azerbaijan	27.900
5	Huang Yan, Wang Cuicui	China	27.507
6	Janina Hiller, Sophia Müller	Germany	26.820

=== Mixed pair ===
Rank	Team	Country	Point
Gold medal	Kristin Allen, Michael Rodrigues	United States	28.600
Silver medal	Tatiana Okulova, Revaz Gurgenidze	Russia	28.300
Bronze medal	Huang Yan, Zhang Shaolong	China	27.858
4	Anzhalika Kashpanava, Yury Vaitsiakhouski	Belarus	27.120
5	Nik De Roeck, Amber van Wijk	Belgium	26.910
6	Ana Koklejeva, Dmitrj Sumilo	Lithuania	26.900
7	Filipe Norton, Mariana Amorim	Portugal	26.220
8	Mirela Ivanova, Zlatin Kirov	Bulgaria	25.480

=== Men's group ===
Rank	Team	Country	Point
Gold medal	Adam Buckingham, Adam McAssey, Alex Uttley, Jonathan Stranks	Great Britain	28.854
Silver medal	Xue Wangxin, Fang Sheng, Zhao Yuchao, Han Yuliang	China	28.801
Bronze medal	Artur Avakyan, Yuriy Gerasimov, Grigoriy Sergienko, Konstantin Stetsenko	Russia	28.552
4	Kiryl Shatau, Kiryl Zhdanovich, Vadzim Ulasevich, Artsiom Khvalko	Belarus	27.280
5	Rostyslav Romaniak, Andriy Moskva, Roman Petsukh, Kostiantyn Gnatiuk	Ukraine	26.300
6	Tomasz Antonowicz, Michal Jarczak, Szymon Rudyk, Maciej Piasecki	Poland	24.900

=== Women's group ===
Rank	Team	Country	Point
Gold medal	Aigul Shaikhutdinova, Ekaterina Stroynova, Ekaterina Loginova	Russia	28.650
Silver medal	Jennie Miller, Emma Walters, Katherine Smith	Great Britain	28.320
Bronze medal	Kateryna Kalyta, Nataliya Vinnyk, Iuliia Odintsova	Ukraine	28.290
4	Corinne van Hombeeck, Maaike Croket, Eloise Vanstaen	Belgium	28.152
5	Sarah Le Corre, Christal Dupire-Betoule, Maxine Eouzan	France	27.754
6	Kinga Beker, Kinga Grzeskow, Kamila Kowalska	Poland	27.400
