= Adam McAssey =

British gymnast (born 1989)

- Born: 18 April 1989 (age 37)

Gymnastics career
- Discipline: Acrobatic gymnastics
- Country represented: United Kingdom
- Club: Heathrow Gymnastics Club
- Head coach: Neil Griffiths
- Assistant coach: Andrew Griffiths
- Choreographer: Nicola Yellop
Medal record
Men's acrobatic gymnastics
Representing Great Britain
World Championships
Gold medal – first place	2010 Wrocław	Men's Fours
Silver medal – second place	2012 Lake Buena Vista	Men's Pairs

Adam McAssey (born 18 April 1989) is a British acrobatic gymnast who won the title of world men's fours champion with Adam Buckingham, Alex Uttley and Jonathan Stranks in July 2010 in Poland. With partner Edward Upcott, McAssey achieved silver in the 2012 Acrobatic Gymnastics World Championships.

McAssey was a member of Spelbound, the gymnastic group who rose to fame in 2010, winning the fourth series of Britain's Got Talent. The prize was £100,000 and the opportunity to appear at the 2010 Royal Variety Performance.
