= Alex Uttley =

British acrobatic gymnast (born 1985)

- Born: 12 May 1985 (age 41)
- Height: 1.75 m (5 ft 9 in)

Gymnastics career
- Discipline: Acrobatic gymnastics
- Country represented: United Kingdom
- Club: Heathrow Gymnastics Club
- Head coach: Neil Griffiths
- Assistant coach: Andrew Griffiths
- Choreographer: Nicola Yellop
- Retired: yes
Medal record
Men's acrobatic gymnastics
Representing Great Britain
World Championships
Gold medal – first place	2010 Wrocław	Men's Fours

Alex Uttley (born 12 May 1985) is a British acrobatic gymnast who won the title of world men's fours champion with Adam Buckingham, Adam McAssey and Jonathan Stranks in July 2010 in Poland.

Uttley is a member of Spelbound, the gymnastic group who rose to fame in 2010, winning the fourth series of Britain's Got Talent. The prize was £100,000 and the opportunity to appear at the 2010 Royal Variety Performance.

Beginning on 9 August 2014, Uttley took part in the BBC One gymnastics series Tumble partnered with Loose Women anchor Andrea McLean.
