= Spelbound =

British gymnastic troume

- Origin: Ashford, Spelthorne
- Genre: Acrobatic Gymnastics Act
- Years active: 2009–2010
- Members: Ryan Bartlett; George Wood; Gareth Wood; Coaches; Andrew Griffiths; Neil Griffiths; Nicola Yellop
- Past members: Katie Axten; Leighanne Cowler; Amy Mackenzie; Adam McAssey; Hollianne Wood; Abigail Ralph; Lauren Kemp; Douglas Fordyce; Edward Upcott; Alanna Baker; Adam Buckingham; Nicholas Illingworth; Georgia Lancaster; Elise Matthews; Dominic Smith; Millie Spalding; Poppy Spalding; Jonathan Stranks; Alice Upcott; Alexander Uttley Fran Groves Kika Green
- Website: spelbound.co.uk

Spelbound are a gymnastic troupe from the United Kingdom who rose to fame in 2010, winning the fourth series of Britain's Got Talent. The prize was £100,000 and the opportunity to appear at the 2010 Royal Variety Performance. They also performed in the Britain's Got Talent Live tour. They have since performed at numerous venues and have been featured in advertisements.

== History ==
=== Early years and lineup (2009–2010) ===
The original group was composed of seven boys and six girls with ages ranging from 12 to 24. They were Adam McAssey, Adam Buckingham, Alex Uttley, Jonathan Stranks, Douglas Fordyce, Edward Upcott, Nicholas Illingworth, Katie Axten, Leighanne Cowler, Lauren Kemp, Hollianne Wood, Abigail Ralph and Amy Mackenzie. Between them, they have won numerous medals in their sport, acrobatic gymnastics, which is an internationally recognized type of gymnastics. Additionally, some of them have taken home European and World medals. Six members (Upcott, Fordyce, Uttley, Stranks, McAssey and Buckingham) went on to the 2010 world championships subsequent to BGT with gold medals in their respective disciplines (men's pair and men's four) in the senior category, also 11-16 age group women's pair Ralph and Mackenzie won a silver medal.

They have competed for their club and for Great Britain all over Europe, including the 2008 Acrobatic Gymnastics World Championships, with six of them competing for GB in Taiwan at the 2009 World Games, an Olympic style event for non-Olympic events.

=== Britain's Got Talent (2010) ===
Spelbound auditioned for BGT, and wowed the judges and the crowd from the start. They performed to the song 'O Fortuna' a poem originally written in the 13th century as part of a collection known as the Carmina Burana, and set to music in 1935/36 by the German composer Carl Orff. They went on to the semi-finals and finals, significantly beating Twist and Pulse in the final round to win the competition in front of over 15 million TV viewers.

They received £100,000 to split amongst themselves, and went on to perform at the Royal Variety Show in December. Unfortunately they did not get to meet the Royal Party of Prince Charles and the Duchess of Cornwall as the Royal car had been attacked by protesters on the streets of London whilst on the way to the show at the London Palladium. They did attend the show but were whisked away by the police straight after the show. Earlier that year, they performed on the game show Magic Numbers, hosted by Stephen Mulhern and accompanied Welsh opera singer Katherine Jenkins at the Concert for Heroes at Twickenham Stadium.

At the end of 2010, they released their first DVD featuring 9 live routines performed before a theatre audience.

=== Change of lineup ===
In November 2010, Katie Axten left the troupe to go to University in Portsmouth. Katie was replaced by Edward Upcott's younger sister, Alice Upcott. At the age of twelve, Alice displaced Amy Mackenzie as the youngest member in the troupe.

The troupe then remained unchanged for approximately 17 months until April 2012 when original members Leighanne Cowler and Amy Mackenzie stepped down. Leighanne, who is a gymnastics coach, decided to focus all her attention on her coaching career and Amy, who had been training as a competition base since retiring as a top in October 2011, wanted to focus fully on her competition career and upcoming GCSEs, they were both replaced by senior women's pair Alanna Baker and Poppy Spalding. In June 2012 Adam McAssey left the troupe to also focus on his coaching career and was replaced by Alice Upcott's competition partner Dominic Smith.

In August 2012 it was announced that more original members Hollianne Wood, Lauren Kemp, Abigail Ralph, Douglas Fordyce and Edward Upcott were leaving Spelbound for new ventures. Hollianne, Lauren and Abigail were replaced by senior women's group Elise Matthews, Georgia Lancaster and Millie Spalding, the sister of Poppy Spalding.

In 2015 after winning Gold at the World Acrobatic Championships, Elise Matthews, Georgia Lancaster and Millie Spalding, retired from the sport and also left Spelbound. As well as the women's trio retiring, Alice Upcott and Dominic Smith, also did. Alice is now currently working with Michael Flatley's Lord of the Dance: Dangerous Games starring as Little Spirit.

=== Olympics 2012 London ===
Spelbound performed twice for the Olympic audience at Wembley Arena for Rhythmic Gymnastics at London 2012 Olympics on 10 and 11 August 2012.

Spelbound also performed twice at the closing ceremony of the London 2012 Summer Olympics in London. Spelbound performed to The Beatles "A Day in the Life" in a gymnastic interpretation of the lyrics to that song. They then performed a second routine on the closing ceremony whilst Ray Davies, lead singer of The Kinks sung Waterloo Sunset. The Closing Ceremony was watched by 26.3 million viewers in the UK.

=== Recent events (2011-present) ===
In May 2011 Spelbound returned to Britain's Got Talent as the star guest to perform a brand new routine based on a musical piece called Nostalgia by Yanni. During the rest of 2011, the group performed many UK shows as well as travelling around the World to places such as Spain, Portugal, Switzerland, Doha, Abu Dhabi, and Dubai on a few occasions where their brand of acrobatic dance has been especially well received.

In March 2012 the group were among the first people to perform at the new Olympic Stadium at a charity test event called the Gold Challenge. Performing a new Olympic inspired routine, the guys achieved a long-held ambition to perform at an Olympic venue.

On 7 April 2012 Spelbound appeared on the ITV Saturday night show, Keith Lemon's Lemonaid. This was also the final performances for both Leighhanne and Amy.

On 19 October 2012 Spelbound performed on Channel 4 telethon called Stand Up To Cancer in a routine which also involved the street dance troupe The A Team.

On 19 November 2012 Spelbound performed on Royal Variety Performance in front of Queen Elizabeth II at Royal Albert Hall with Diversity, Paul Potts and Stavros Flatley. The show aired on 3 December 2012 on ITV1.

== Members ==
Member	2009	2010	2011	2012	2013	2014	2015
Katie Axten (2009–2010)							
Alanna Baker (2012)							
Ryan Bartlett (2014–Present)							
Adam Buckingham							
Leighanne Cowler (2009–2012)							
Douglas Fordyce (2009–2012)							
Nicholas Illingworth							
Lauren Kemp (2009–2012)							
Georgia Lancaster (2012–2014)							
Adam McAssey (2009–2012)							
Amy Mackenzie (2009–2012)							
Elise Matthews (2012–2014)							
Abigail Ralph (2009–2012)							
Dominic Smith (2012–2014)							
Millie Spalding (2012–2014)							
Poppy Spalding (2012–2014)							
Jonathan Stranks (2009–2014)							
Alice Upcott (2010–2014)							
Edward Upcott (2009–2012)							
Alexander Uttley							
George Wood (2014–Present)							
Gareth Wood (2014–Present)							
Hollianne Wood (2009–2012)							

Preceded by Diversity	Winner of Britain's Got Talent; 2010	Succeeded by Jai McDowall
