= Magic Numbers (game show) =

- Created by: Paul Brassey
- Presented by: Stephen Mulhern
- Voices of: Peter Dickson
- Country of origin: United Kingdom
- Original language: English
- No. of series: 1
- No. of episodes: 7

Production
- Production location: The London Studios
- Running time: 60 minutes (inc. adverts)
- Production company: CPL Productions

Original release
- Network: ITV
- Release: 17 July – 28 August 2010

Magic Numbers is a British television game show which aired for one series of seven episodes in July and August 2010.

== Show format ==
The show is hosted by magician Stephen Mulhern, who was joined each week by a number of celebrity guests. In the first part of each episode, the celebrity guests answered questions or took part in challenges to generate a sequence of 6 numbers. Members of the public then called a Premium-rate telephone number if their home or mobile phone number contained two or more of these digits. Callers were entered into a prize draw, the winner of which would compete in the final round for a prize of up to £400,000. Throughout the show, Mulhern would also perform a number of magic tricks or illusions, assisted by some of that week's celebrity guests. While the initial public phone-in was taking place, Mulhern would also perform a featured grand illusion, again assisted by one or more of that week's celebrity guests.

The highest prize won by a contestant was £310,000, won by Chris from Kent.

== Similarity to previous ITV game shows ==
The show was very similar to a previous ITV game show, Talking Telephone Numbers, the key difference being that viewers of Magic Numbers could call in if two of the numbers matched their phone number, rather than five as on the previous show. This was a technique employed by ITV to generate more calls, and hence higher revenues from the show.

The show was created by CPL Productions and Paul Brassey and commissioned by John Kaye Cooper at ITV.

== Episode guide ==
Show	Air date	Guests	Featured illusion
1	17 July 2010	Holly Willoughby, JLS & Twist and Pulse	Clearly Impossible sawing in half of Holly Willoughby
2	24 July 2010	Diana Vickers, Alistair McGowan, Amanda Holden & The Baseballs	"Sawing in thirds" - Diana Vickers being sawed in three
3	31 July 2010	Louie Spence, Paddy McGuinness, The Magnets & Scouting for Girls	Louie Spence being guillotined
4	7 August 2010	Emma Bunton, Ruth Langsford, Eamonn Holmes, Peridot & The Saturdays	"Compressed" - Vanessa from The Saturdays being crushed until she's just 18 inches tall
5	14 August 2010	Kym Marsh, Alex Reid & McFly	"The Head Mover" - Kym Marsh having her head cut off and placed on a table on the other side of the stage
6	21 August 2010	Alexandra Burke, Pamela Anderson, Flawless, Stevie Starr & Bjorn Again	"Light as a feather" - Pamela Anderson being levitated
7	28 August 2010	Denise van Outen, Katherine Jenkins, Merlin Cadogan, Rav Wilding, String Fever, Tap Dogs & Olly Murs	"The Crystal Sawing" - Katherine Jenkins being sawed in half by Mulhern and Murs in the UK premiere of the Les Arnold-designed clear sawing in half illusion
