= Britain's Got Talent series 4 =

Britain's Got Talent
- Series 4
- Hosted by: Ant & Dec (ITV); Stephen Mulhern (ITV2)
- Judges: Piers Morgan; Amanda Holden; Simon Cowell; Louis Walsh (Birmingham auditions)
- Winner: Spelbound
- Runner-up: Twist and Pulse

Release
- Original network: ITV; ITV2 (BGMT)
- Original release: 17 April – 5 June 2010

Series chronology
- ← Previous; Series 3 Next → Series 5

Judges and Presenter(s) for Britain's Got Talent Series 4

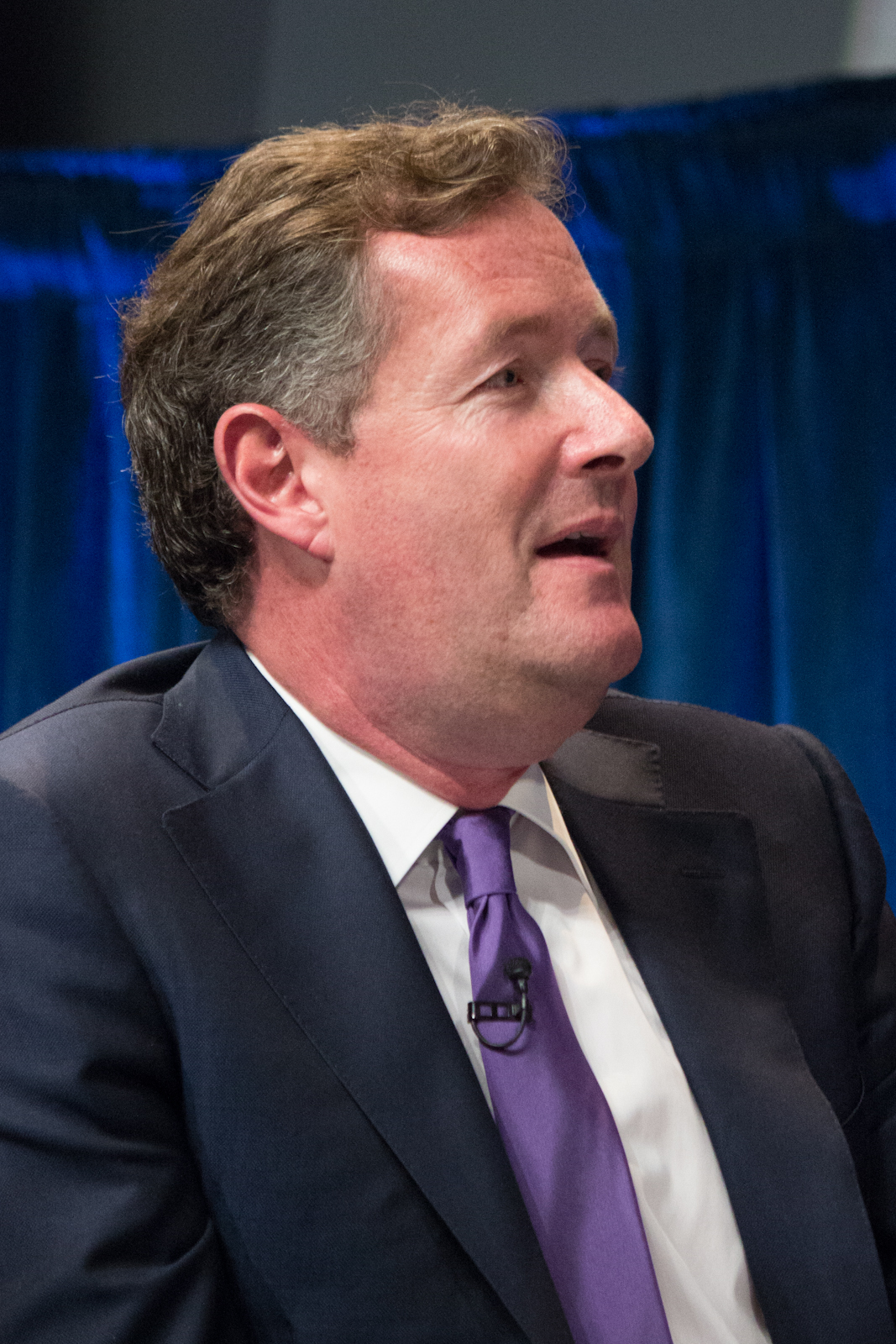
Piers Morgan

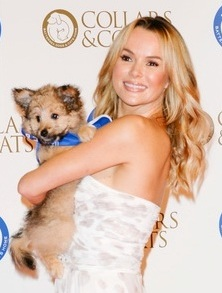
Amanda Holden

Simon Cowell

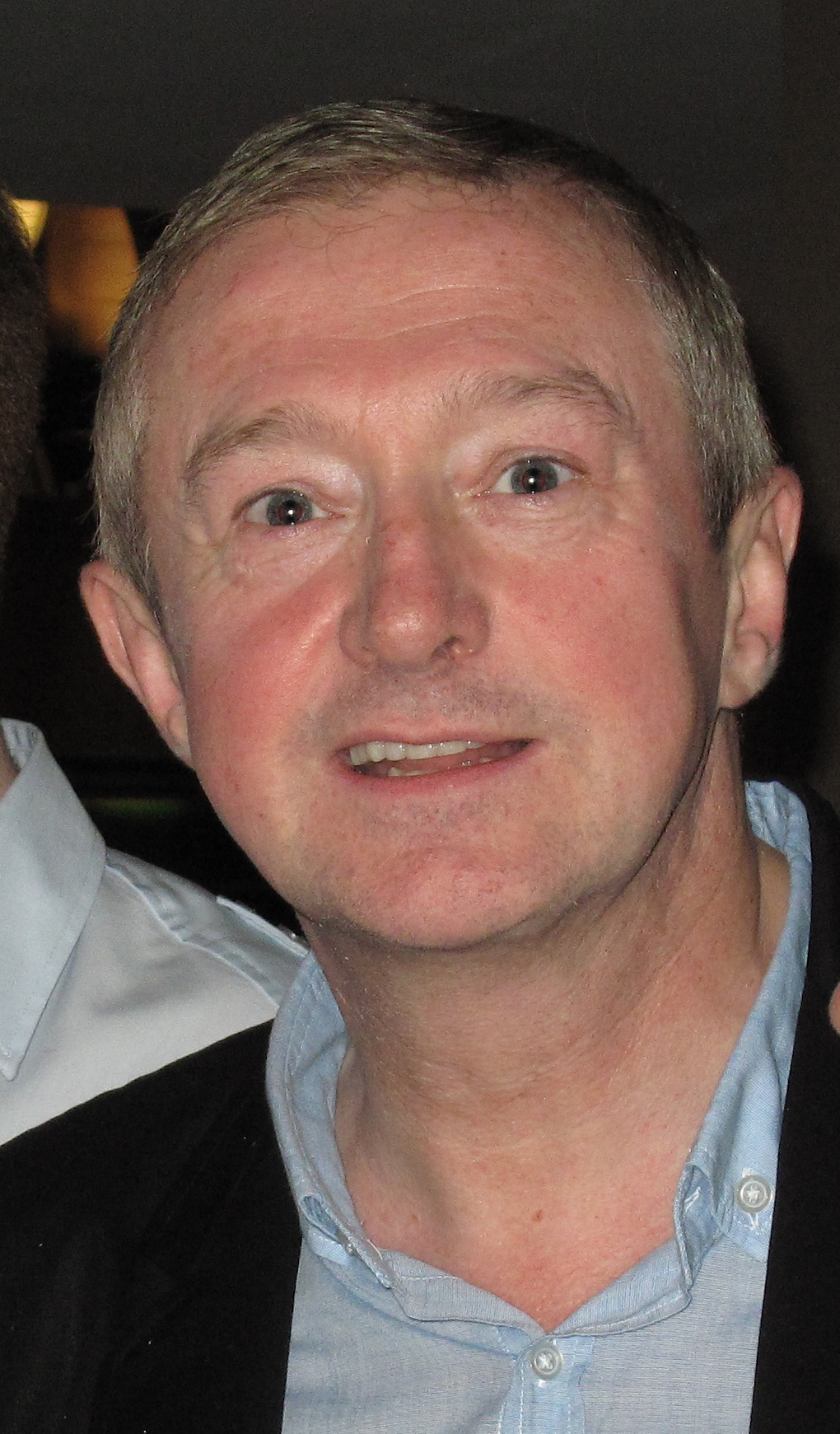
Louis Walsh (Guest)

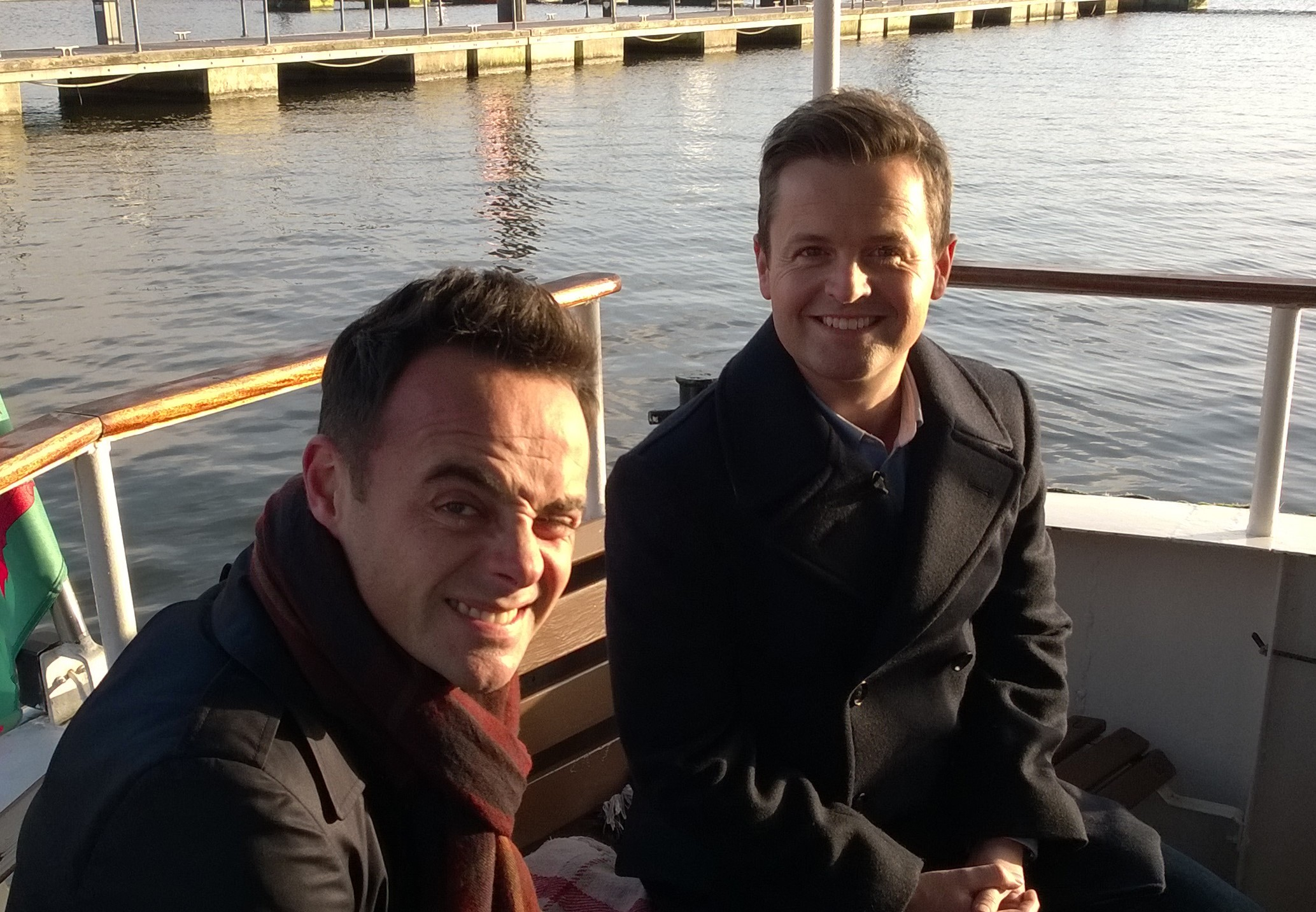
Ant & Dec(ITV1)

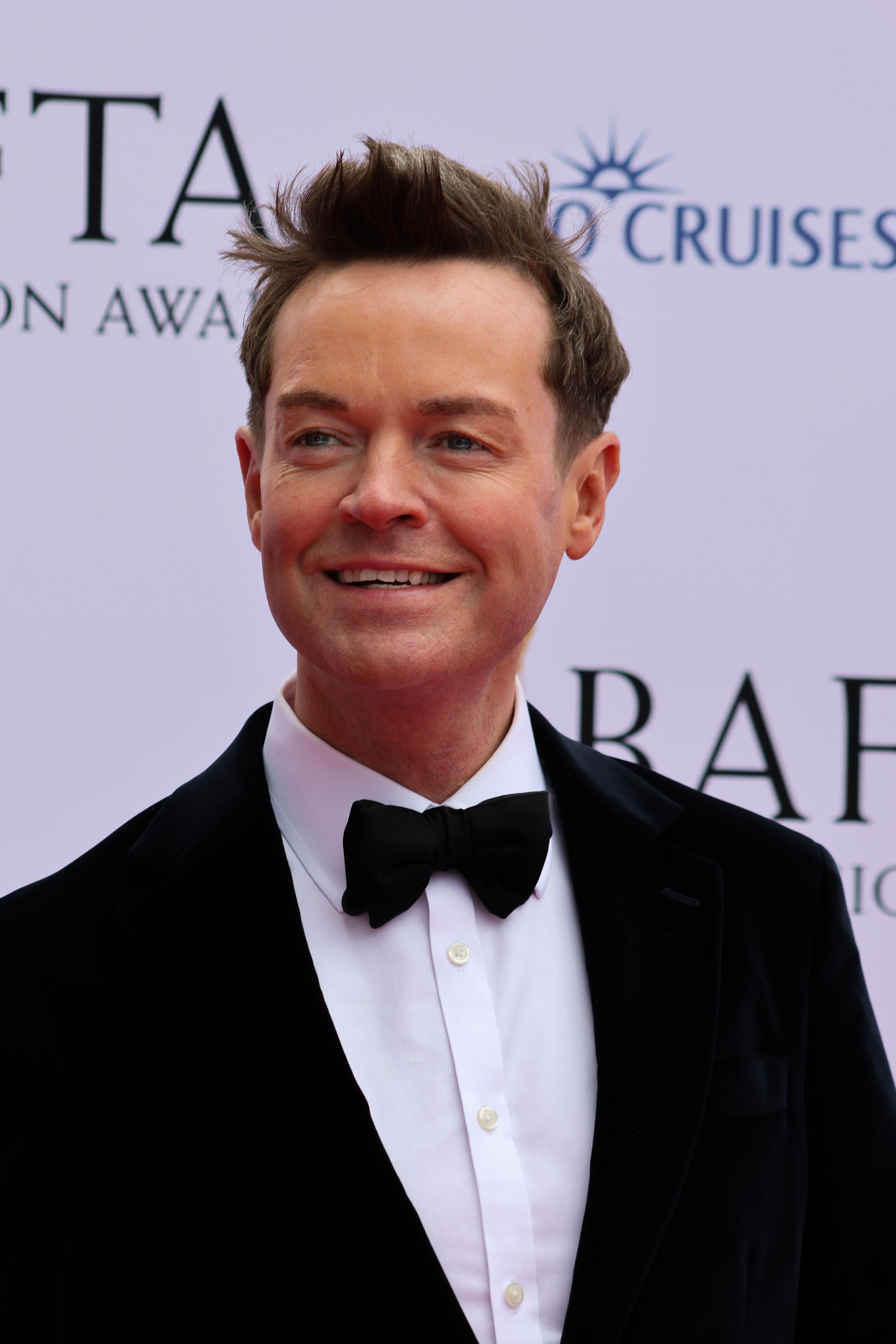
Stephen Mulhern(ITV2)

The fourth series of British talent competition programme Britain's Got Talent was broadcast on ITV, from 17 April to 5 June 2010; due to live coverage of the 2010 UEFA Champions League Final on 22 May, the sixth audition episode of the series was pushed back a day to avoid clashing with it. Production on the fourth series during the filmed auditions required Louis Walsh to step in as a guest judge, after Simon Cowell became ill and unable to partake in certain sessions.

The fourth series was won by gymnastic troupe Spelbound, with dance duo Twist and Pulse finishing in second place and drummer Kieran Gaffney third. During its broadcast, the series averaged around 11 million viewers. Episodes of the live rounds were the first in the programme's history to feature guest performers within live result episodes, and were also the first to be broadcast in high definition; both the audition episodes and its sister show, Britain's Got More Talent, remained in standard definition until the following year.

== Series overview ==
Following open auditions held the previous year, the Judges' auditions took place across January and February 2010, within Manchester, Glasgow, Birmingham, London and Cardiff. They also took place within Newcastle upon Tyne, after they were cancelled at the last minute during production of the previous series. The Birmingham auditions were most notable in this series, due to the fact that because Cowell fell ill before he could attend them, marking the first time in the show's history he was unable to attend auditions, Louis Walsh replaced him as a guest judge for these until he had recovered. One significant change made to the programme in this series was towards the scheduling of semi-finals. Both the production staff and the broadcaster decided for the live semi-finals to follow a similar format incorporated in the live final – each set of semi-final performances were held in one episode, followed by a break to allow ITV to air another programme or a news programme, so as to give time for the public vote to be counted. The results would then be aired after this break, in a live results episode, much like the live finals had done in the past three series.

Of the participants that took part, only forty made it past this stage and into the five live semi-finals, with eight appearing in each one, and ten of these acts making it into the live final. The following below lists the results of each participant's overall performance in this series:

Winner | Runner-Up | Finalist | Semi-finalist

Participant	Age(s) ^{1}	Genre	Performance Type	Semi-Final	Result
A3	13–19	Dance	Dance Trio	5	Eliminated
Alesia Vazmitsel	30	Dance	Pole Dancer	5	Eliminated
Chloe Hickinbottom	10	Singing	Singer	3	Eliminated
Christopher Stone	28	Singing	Opera Singer	3	Finalist
Connected	13–15	Singing	Boy Band	2	Finalist
Dance Flavourz	22–37	Dance	Carnival Dance Group	5	Eliminated
Emile Harris	17	Singing	Singer	4	Eliminated
Father & Son	53 & 26	Singing	Singing Duo	5	Eliminated
Ice	12–18	Dance	Street Dance Group	4	Eliminated
Janey Cutler	81	Singing	Singer	4	Finalist
Jimmy Ford	75	Dance	Irish Dancer	3	Eliminated
Josh Barry	16	Singing	Singer	1	Eliminated
Kev Orkian	36	Singing / Music	Impressionist & Pianist	2	Eliminated
Kevin Cruise	33	Singing	Singer	1	Eliminated
Kieran Gaffney	13	Music	Drummer	5	Third Place
Liam McNally	14	Singing	Boy Soprano	5	Finalist
Mark James	30	Singing	Half & Half Drag Singer	4	Eliminated
Maxxie Oliver	21	Singing	Lady Gaga Impersonator	2	Eliminated
Michael Fayombo Jnr & Snr	14 & 38	Dance	Michael Jackson Dance Duo	2	Eliminated
Myztikal	10–30	Singing / Dance	Vocal Dance Group	5	Eliminated
Neil Fullard	42	Singing	Jazz Singer	2	Eliminated
Olivia Archbold	14	Singing	Singer	1	Eliminated
Paul Burling	40	Comedy	Impressionist	3	Finalist
Peridot	21–27	Dance	Dance Group	3	Eliminated
Philip Grimmer	57	Dance	Drag Dancer	3	Eliminated
Ruby Girls	19–25	Dance	Dance Group	2	Eliminated
Sean Sheehan	66	Singing / Variety	Singer & Woodcutter	1	Eliminated
Spelbound	12–24	Acrobatics	Gymnastics Group	1	Winner
Starburst	9–13	Dance	Dance Group	3	Eliminated
Stevie Starr	47	Danger	Regurgitator	1	Eliminated
Taboo	7–23	Dance	Dance Group	2	Eliminated
Team Shaolin	8–29	Acrobatics	Martial Arts Group	4	Eliminated
The Arrangement	17–18	Singing / Music	Singer & Orchestra	3	Eliminated
The Chippendoubles	30–48	Dance	Celebrity Impersonators	5	Eliminated
The Fusion	15–30	Dance	Dance Group	4	Eliminated
Three Bee	18–30	Dance	Bollywood Dance Group	1	Eliminated
Tina & Chandi	37 & 11 ^{3}	Animals	Dog Act	2	Finalist
Tobias Mead	22	Dance	Dancer	1	Finalist
Twist & Pulse	18 & 19	Comedy / Dance	Comic Dance Duo	4	Runner-Up
Tyler Patterson	10	Dance	Street Dancer	4	Eliminated

- ^1 Ages denoted for a participant(s), pertain to their final performance for this series.
- ^2 No precise locations were disclosed for The Chippendoubles – both as a group or for each respective member – during their time on the programme.
- ^3 The latter value is the age of the dog, as disclosed by its owner.

=== Semi-final summary ===
Buzzed out | Judges' vote | Won the public vote
Won the judges' vote | Lost the judges' vote | Eliminated

==== Semi-final 1 (31 May) ====
- Guest performance: Diversity

Semi-Finalist	Order	Performance Type	Buzzes and Judges' Vote			Percentage	Result
Semi-Finalist	Order	Performance Type	Cowell	Holden	Morgan	Percentage	Result
Three Bee	1	Bollywood Dance Group				1.7%	6th – Eliminated
Olivia Archbold	2	Singer				11.3%	3rd (Lost Judges' Vote)
Kevin Cruise	3	Singer				1.5%	7th – Eliminated
Stevie Starr	4	Regurgitator				6.4%	4th – Eliminated
Tobias Mead	5	Dancer				14.3%	2nd (Won Judges' Vote)
Sean Sheehan	6	Singer & Woodcutter				0.7%	8th – Eliminated
Josh Barry	7	Singer				1.7%	5th – Eliminated
Spelbound	8	Gymnastics Group				62.4%	1st (Won Public Vote)

==== Semi-final 2 (1 June) ====
- Guest performance: Alicia Keys ("Try Sleeping with a Broken Heart")

Semi-Finalist	Order	Performance Type	Buzzes and Judges' Vote			Percentage	Result
Semi-Finalist	Order	Performance Type	Cowell	Holden	Morgan	Percentage	Result
Taboo	1	Dance Group				3.4%	4th – Eliminated
Neil Fullard	2	Jazz Singer				17.2%	2nd (Lost Judges' Vote)
Ruby Girls	3	Dance Group				1.1%	8th – Eliminated
Connected	4	Boy Band				15.2%	3rd (Won Judges' Vote)
Kev Orkian	5	Impressionist & Keyboardist				1.4%	6th – Eliminated
Michael Fayombo Jnr & Snr	6	Michael Jackson Dance Duo				2.5%	5th – Eliminated
Tina & Chandi	7	Dog Act				58.1%	1st (Won Public Vote)
Maxxie Oliver	8	Lady Gaga Impersonator				1.1%	7th – Eliminated

==== Semi-final 3 (2 June) ====
- Guest performance: Pixie Lott ("Turn It Up")

Semi-Finalist	Order	Performance Type	Buzzes and Judges' Vote			Percentage	Result
Semi-Finalist	Order	Performance Type	Cowell	Holden	Morgan	Percentage	Result
Starburst	1	Dance Group				3.5%	6th – Eliminated
Chloe Hickinbottom	2	Singer				6.2%	5th – Eliminated
Philip Grimmer	3	Drag Dancer				0.4%	8th – Eliminated
Paul Burling	4	Impressionist				36.4%	1st (Won Public Vote)
The Arrangement	5	Singer & Orchestra				7.8%	4th – Eliminated
Jimmy Ford	6	Irish Dancer				1.7%	7th – Eliminated
Christopher Stone	7	Opera Singer				33.0%	2nd (Won Judges' Vote)
Peridot	8	Dance Group				11.0%	3rd (Lost Judges' Vote)

==== Semi-final 4 (3 June) ====
- Guest performance: Miley Cyrus ("Can't Be Tamed")

Semi-Finalist	Order	Performance Type	Buzzes and Judges' Vote			Percentage	Result
Semi-Finalist	Order	Performance Type	Cowell	Holden	Morgan	Percentage	Result
Ice	1	Street Dance Group				1.7%	5th – Eliminated
Tyler Patterson	2	Dancer				6.3%	4th – Eliminated
Emile Harris	3	Singer				0.6%	8th – Eliminated
Twist & Pulse	4	Comic Dance Duo				37.4%	2nd (Won Judges' Vote)
Team Shaolin	5	Martial Arts Group				0.8%	7th – Eliminated
Mark James	6	Half & Half Drag Singer				0.9%	6th – Eliminated
The Fusion	7	Dance Group				9.4%	3rd (Lost Judges' Vote)
Janey Cutler	8	Singer				42.9%	1st (Won Public Vote)

==== Semi-final 5 (4 June) ====
- Guest performance: JLS ("The Club Is Alive")

Semi-Finalist	Order	Performance Type	Buzzes and Judges' Vote			Percentage	Result
Semi-Finalist	Order	Performance Type	Cowell	Holden	Morgan	Percentage	Result
The Chippendoubles	1	Celebrity Impersonators				2.2%	8th – Eliminated
Liam McNally	2	Boy Soprano				21.0%	2nd (Won Judges' Vote)
Alesia Vazmitsel	3	Pole Dancer				5.3%	4th – Eliminated
Myztikal	4	Vocal Dance Group				4.4%	5th – Eliminated
Dance Flavourz	5	Carnival Dance Group				3.4%	6th – Eliminated
Father & Son	6	Singing Duo				2.4%	7th – Eliminated
A3	7	Dance Trio				12.1%	3rd (Lost Judges' Vote)
Kieran Gaffney	8	Drummer				49.2%	1st (Won Public Vote)

=== Final (5 June) ===
Usher ("OMG") and Dizzee Rascal & James Corden ("Shout")

Winner | Runner-up

Finalist	Order	Performance Type	Percentage	Finished
Twist & Pulse	1	Comic Dance Duo	12.4%	2nd
Liam McNally	2	Boy Soprano	3.0%	10th
Paul Burling	3	Impressionist	8.7%	5th
Christopher Stone	4	Opera Singer	5.1%	7th
Tina & Chandi	5	Dog Act	9.0%	4th
Connected	6	Boy Band	4.8%	8th
Kieran Gaffney	7	Drummer	9.6%	3rd
Tobias Mead	8	Dancer	6.9%	6th
Janey Cutler	9	Singer	3.6%	9th
Spelbound	10	Gymnastics Group	36.9%	1st

== Ratings ==
Episode	Air Date	Total viewers (millions)	ITV1 Weekly rank	Viewer Share (%)
Auditions 1	17 April	11.87	1	44.0
Auditions 2	24 April	11.60	1	45.7
Auditions 3	1 May	11.84	1	43.9
Auditions 4	8 May	12.17	1	44.1
Auditions 5	15 May	10.84	1	43.8
Auditions 6	23 May	10.68	1	42.8
Auditions 7	29 May	10.87	1	40.3
Semi-final 1	31 May	11.82	2	43.1
Semi-final 1 results	31 May	11.32	4	40.3
Semi-final 2	1 June	11.17	5	41.2
Semi-final 2 results	1 June	10.69	8	39.0
Semi-final 3	2 June	10.88	6	45.6
Semi-final 3 results	2 June	9.19	13	34.2
Semi-final 4	3 June	10.37	9	48.2
Semi-final 4 results	3 June	10.34	10	41.7
Semi-final 5	4 June	10.13	11	46.3
Semi-final 5 results	4 June	9.64	12	39.4
Live final	5 June	13.50	1	54.6
