= List of Taiwanese people =

This is a list of famous Taiwanese people. People who were not born in Taiwan are indicated by an asterisk (*, notation incomplete).

== Artists and performers ==
- Alien Huang Hong sheng 黄鸿升
- Annie Shizuka Inoh 伊能静
- Chen Bo-lin 陳柏霖
- Chang Chen 張震
- Brigitte Lin 林青霞
- Huang He 黃河
- Jerry Yan 言承旭
- Joe Chen Qiao En 陳喬恩
- Jeng Jundian 鄭君殿
- Joey Wong 王祖賢
- Ken Chu 朱孝天
- Jimmy Lin 林志穎
- Ruby Lin 林心如
- Chase Tang 唐嘉壕
- Vanness Wu* 吳建豪
- Vic Chou 周渝民
- Kelly Lin 林熙蕾
- Barbie Hsu 徐熙媛
- Rainie Yang 楊丞琳
- Ariel Lin 林依晨
- Chang Shu-hao 張書豪
- Jolin Tsai 蔡依林
- Takeshi Kaneshiro 金城武
- Nicky Wu 吳奇隆
- Show Lo 羅志祥
- Jay Chou 周杰倫
- Cindy Yen 袁詠琳
- Chris Wang 王宥勝
- Wu Chin-tai 吳金黛

=== Models ===
- Lin Chi-ling 林志玲
- Alice Lin 林昀佳
- Alicia Liu 劉薰愛
- Faith Yang 楊乃文
- Yinling 垠凌
- Sonia Sui 隋棠

=== Singers and bands for popular music ===
- A-mei 張惠妹
- Alec Su 蘇有朋
- Alien Huang 黄鸿升
- Amber Liu* (f(x)) 劉逸雲
- Chang Fei 張菲
- Cheer Chen 陳綺貞
- Chen Ying-Git 陳盈潔
- Chou Chuan-huing 周傳雄
- Chthonic 閃靈
- Cindy Yen 袁詠琳
- Cyndi Wang 王心凌
- David Tao 陶喆
- Elva Hsiao 蕭亞軒
- Typhoon
- Evan Yo 蔡旻佑
- Evonne Hsu 許慧欣
- F.I.R 飛兒樂團
- F4
- Fahrenheit 飛輪海
- Fei Yu-ching 費玉清
- Fong Fei-fei 凤飞飞
- Freya Lim 林凡
- i.n.g
- Jacky Wu 吳宗憲
- Jay Chou 周杰倫
- Jeff Chang 張信哲
- Jerry Yan 言承旭
- Jimmy Lin 林志穎
- Jiro Wang 汪東城
- Jody Chiang 江蕙
- Jolin Tsai 蔡依林
- Kang Jing Rong 康康
- Ken Chu 朱孝天
- Lai Guanlin (Wanna One) 賴冠霖
- Landy Wen 溫嵐
- Leehom Wang 王力宏
- Liu Yangyang (NCT/WayV) 劉揚揚
- Lollipop F 棒棒糖
- Machi 麻吉
- Mark Tuan (Got7) 段宜恩
- Mayday 五月天
- Nicky Wu 吳奇隆
- Peggy Hsu 許哲珮
- Rainie Yang 楊丞琳
- Richie Ren 任賢齊
- S.H.E
- Seraphim 六翼天使
- Show Lo 羅志祥/小豬
- Shuhua ((G)I-DLE) 葉舒華
- Sodagreen 蘇打綠
- Takeshi Kaneshiro 金城武
- Tank 吕建忠
- Teresa Teng 鄧麗君
- Tim Wu* 金力若
- Tsai Chin 蔡琴
- Tzuyu (Twice) 周子瑜
- Vic Zhou 周渝民
- Vivian Hsu 徐若瑄
- Will Pan 潘瑋柏
- Wu Bai 伍佰
- Yi-hisang Nicholas Wang (&Team)

=== Musicians ===
- Chen Da, singer
- Ch'eng Mao-yün*, violinist and composer
- Lin Cho-liang, violinist
- Jenny Lin, pianist
- Kessier Hsu, guitarist and composer
- Freddy Lim, vocalist and Hena player
- Julie Chang 張鈴, pianist and flutist
- Ching-Yun Hu, pianist
- Ouyang Nana*, cellist, actress
- Ray Chen, Taiwanese-Australian violinist
- Yu-Chien Tseng, violinist
- Ed Yen, executive producer

=== Film-makers ===
- Ang Lee 李安, Academy Award winner
- Hou Hsiao-hsien* 侯孝賢, director of the A City of Sadness, Golden Lion winner
- Tsai Ming-liang* 蔡明亮, Golden Lion winner
- Wei Te-sheng 魏德聖
- Edward Yang 楊德昌, director of Yi Yi, winner of the Best Director Award in Cannes

=== Comedians ===
- Ed Hill (comedian), award-winning stand-up comedian

=== Drag Performers ===
- Nymphia Wind* 妮妃雅‧瘋, winner of RuPaul's Drag Race season 16

See also: Cinema of Taiwan

== Athletes ==
=== Billiards ===
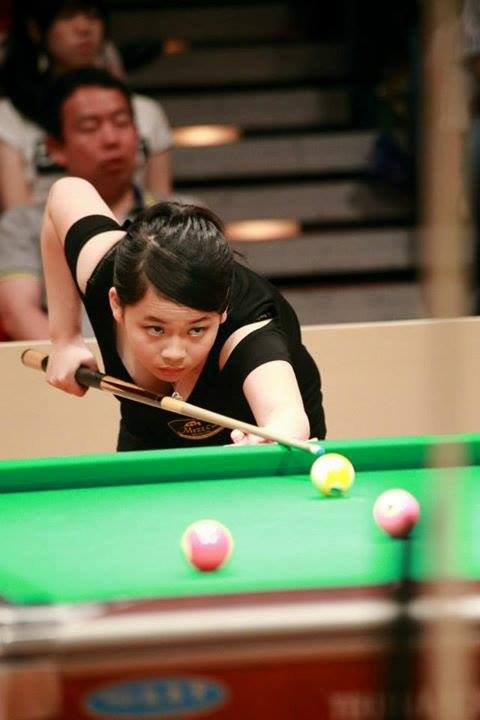
Zhiting Wu

- Jennifer Chen
- Huang Hsin (pool)
- Po-Cheng Kuo
- Kun-Fang Lee
- Hung-Hsiang Wang
- Chia-Ching Wu
- Ching-Shun Yang
- Zhiting Wu

=== Badminton ===
- Tai Tzu-ying, at the age of 22, she became world No. 1 in the women's singles in December 2016, and holds the record for most weeks ranked at the top in BWF history
- Chou Tien-chen, currently 4th place in the BWF World Ranking (as of February 2021)

=== Basketball ===
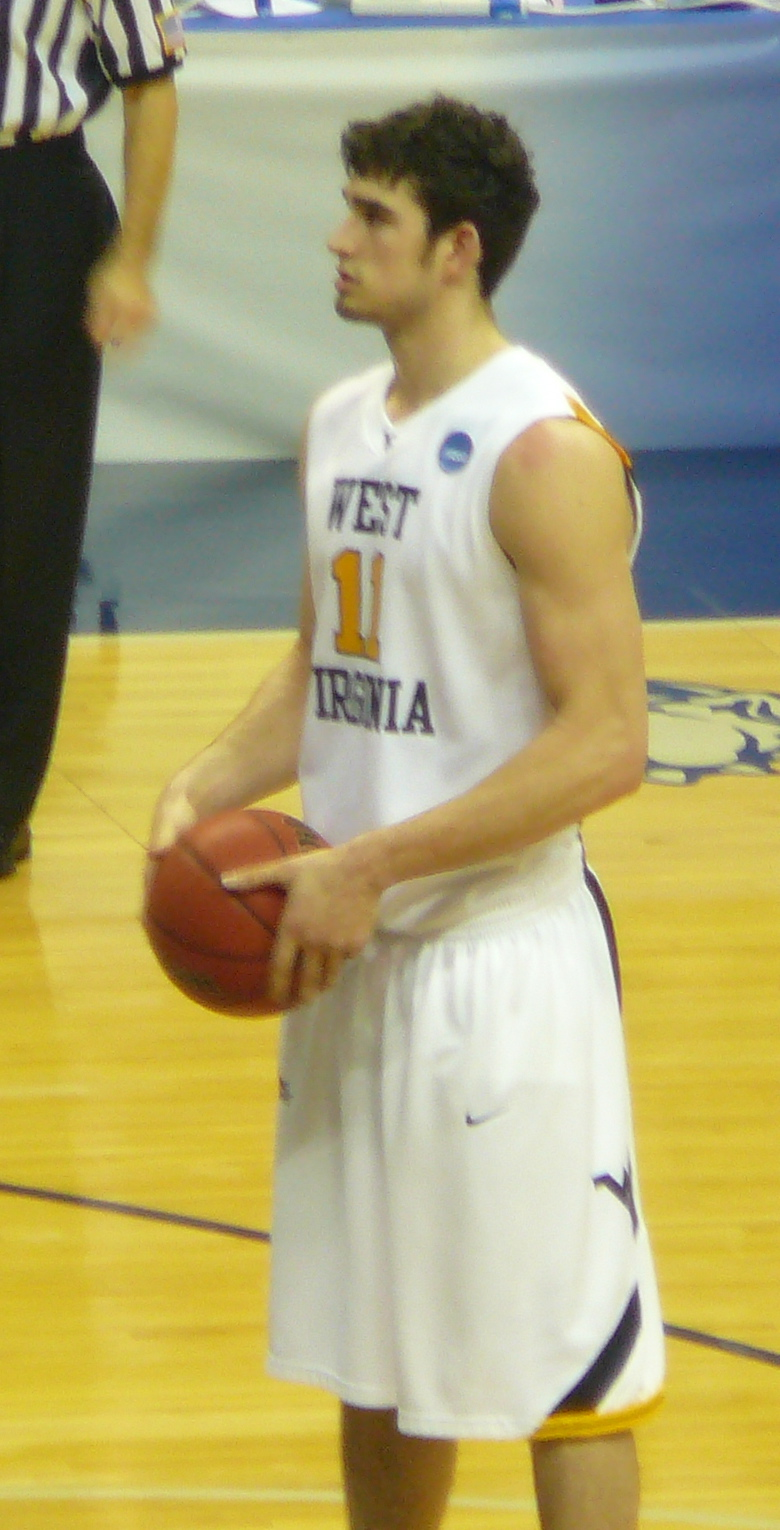
Joe Alexander

- Jeremy Lin 林書豪, former NBA player
- Joe Alexander (born 1986), American-Israeli basketball player for Maccabi Tel Aviv born in Taiwan
- Cheng Chih-lung 鄭志龍
- Chen Hsin-An (Sean Chen) 陳信安
- Lee Hsueh-Lin 李學林
- Tien Lei 田壘 (born 1983)
- Tseng Wen-Ting 曾文鼎
- Lin Chih-Chieh 林志傑
- Jet Chang 張宗憲
- Quincy Davis 戴維斯

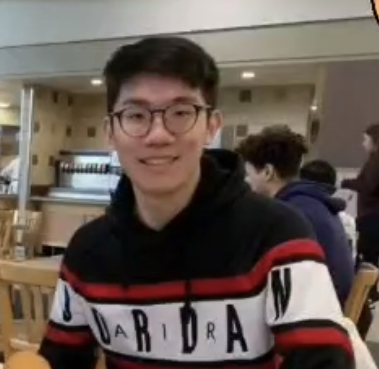
Austin Cheng

=== Baseball ===
==== Infielders ====
- Chin-Lung Hu, Los Angeles Dodgers 2007 All-Star Futures Game MVP
- Yung-Chi Chen, Oakland Athletics 3A
- Sen Yang, Uni-President Lions (CPBL)
- Tai-Shan Chang, Sinon Bulls (CPBL)
- Tzu-Wei Lin, Boston Red Sox

==== Outfielders ====
- Chen Chih-peng, (CPBL) 2006–2010 seasons
- Chia-Hsian Hsieh, Macoto Cobras (CPBL)
- Chin-Feng Chen, Los Angeles Dodgers, La New Bears (CPBL)
- Che-Hsuan Lin, Houston Astros 3A 2008 All-Star Futures Game MVP
- Wang Po-Jung, Lamigo Monkeys (CPBL) 2016 CPBL MVP and ROY, first to record 200 hits in single season

==== Pitchers ====
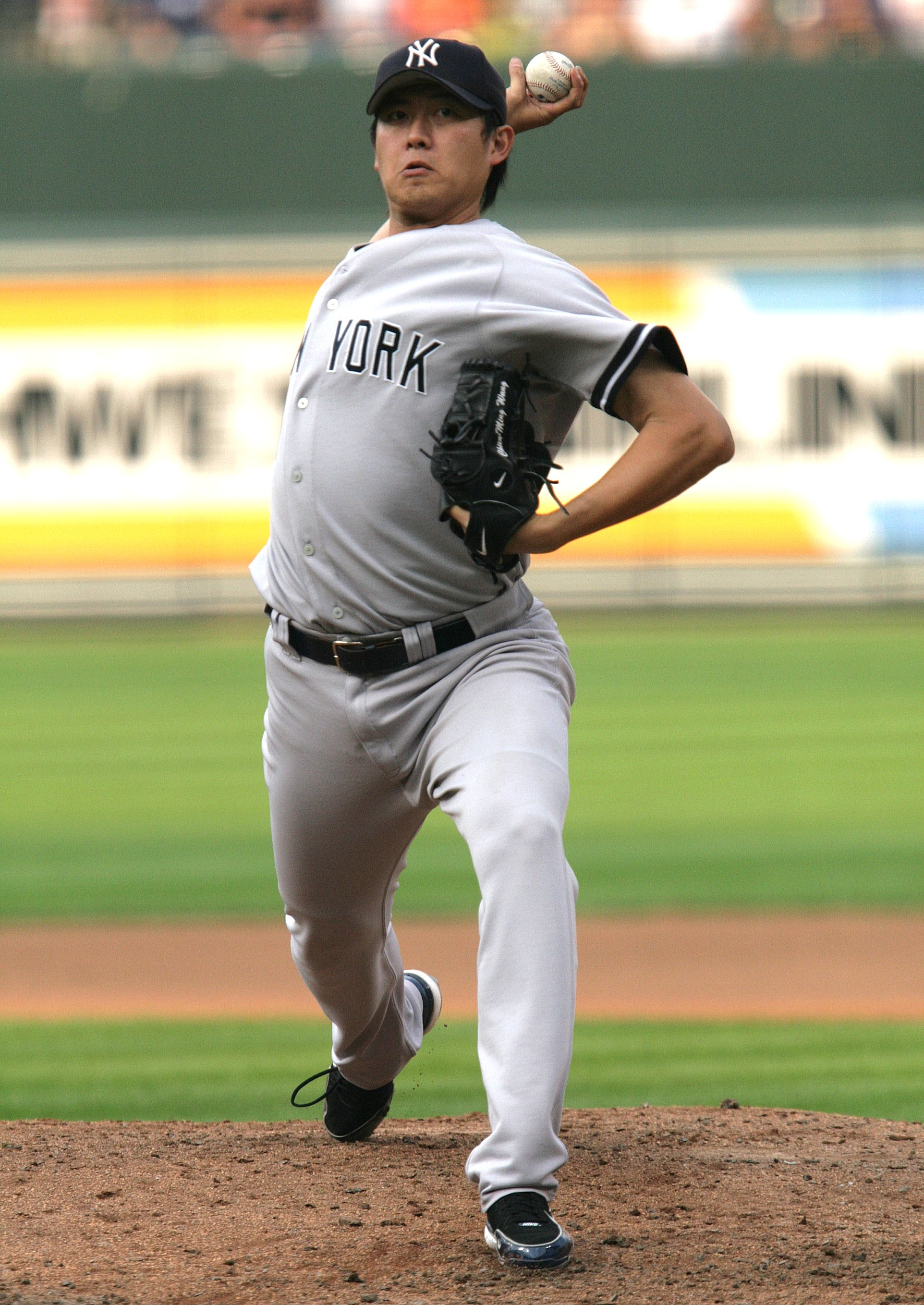
Chien-Ming Wang

- Chien-Fu Yang, Uni-President Lions (CPBL)
- Chien-Ming Wang, former MLB player.
- Chien-Ming Chiang, Yomiuri Giants (NPB)
- Chin-Hui Tsao, former MLB player.
- En-Yu Lin, Tohoku Rakuten Golden Eagles (NPB)
- Hong-Chih Kuo, former MLB player.
- Ming-Chieh Hsu, Seibu Lions (NPB)
- Tai-Yuan Kuo, former Seibu Lions (NPB)
- Wei-Yin Chen, Hanshin Tigers (NPB), former MLB player.
- Fu-Te Ni, former Fubon Guardians (CPBL), former MLB player.
- Chia-Jen Lo, Wei Chuan Dragons (CPBL), former MLB player.
- CC Lee, CTBC Brothers (CPBL), former MLB player.
- Wei-Chung Wang, Wei Chuan Dragons (CPBL), former MLB player.

=== Golf ===
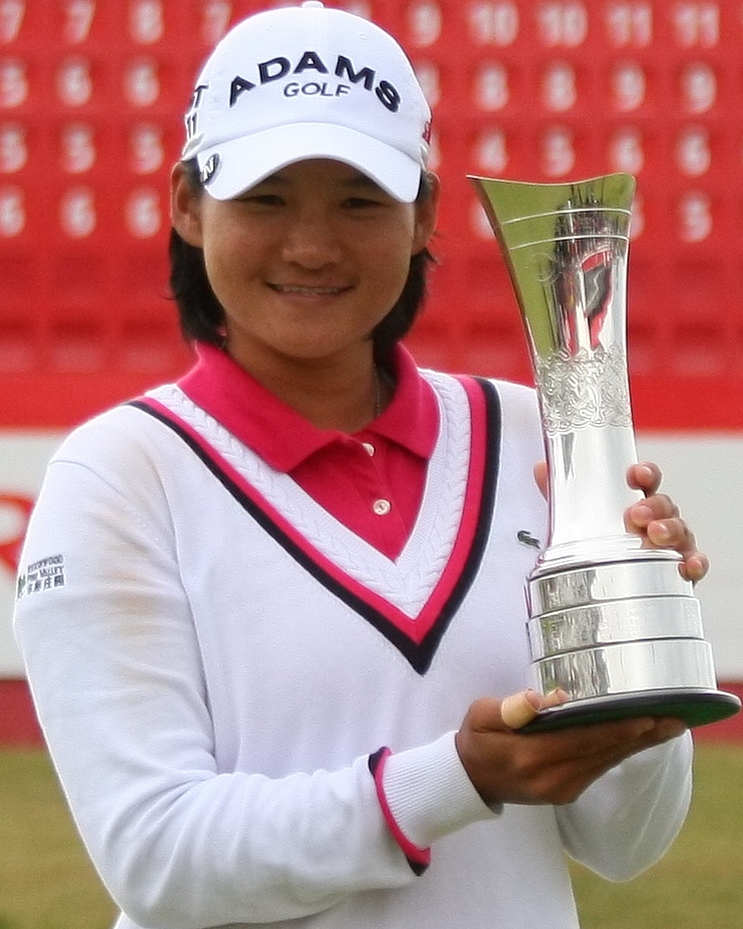
Yani Tseng

- Yani Tseng, LPGA player. She is the youngest player ever, male or female, to win five major championships and was ranked number 1 in the Women's World Golf Rankings for 109 consecutive weeks from 2011 to 2013.

=== Table tennis ===
- Ben Chiu, 1st (1981 Jr. Canadian Champion), 2nd (1984 US Open doubles)

=== Tennis ===
- Yen-Hsun Lu, professional player
- Yeu-Tzuoo Wang, professional player
- Jason Jung
- Su-Wei Hsieh, winner of 3 WTA singles titles and 28 WTA doubles titles

=== Olympic medalists ===
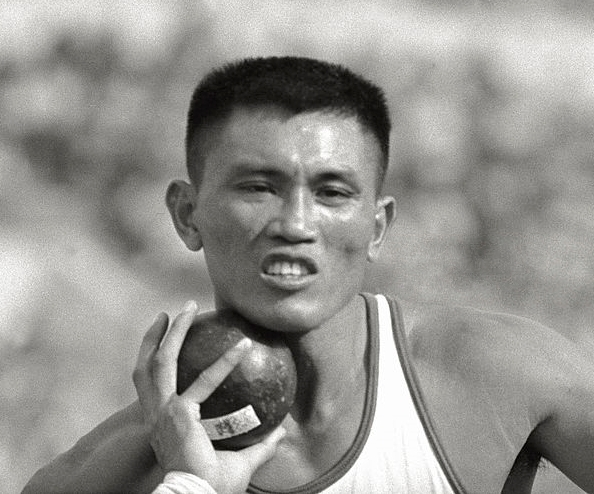
Chuan-Kwang Yang

- Shih-Hsin Chen, gold medal, Athens Olympics, 2004
- Mu-Yen Chu, gold medal, Athens Olympics, 2004
- Chuan-Kwang Yang, silver medal, Rome Olympics, 1960
- Chih-Hsiung Huang, silver medal, Athens Olympics, 2004; bronze medal, Sydney Olympics, 2000
- Cheng Chi, bronze medal, Mexico Olympics, 1968

== Business people ==
- Momofuku Ando 吳百福, founder of Nissin Food Products Company Limited
- Jimmy Lin Chih Ying 林志穎, CEO of an IT company/has own racing team/owns JR(Jimmy Racing) company
- Morris Chang 張忠謀
- David Chu, co-founder of Nautica
- Shenan Chuang 莊淑芬, chief executive officer for Ogilvy & Mather Greater China
- Terry Gou 郭台銘
- Jen Hsun Huang, co-founder and former President and CEO of NVIDIA Corporation
- Min Kao, co-founder of Garmin
- Koo Chen-fu 辜振甫
- Winston Wang, founded Grace Semiconductor Manufacturing
- Wang Yung-ching 王永慶
- Steve Chen, co-founder and Chief Technology Officer of YouTube 陳士駿
- Steve Chang, co-founder of Trend Micro 張明正
- Stan Shih, co-founder of Acer 施振榮
- Aimee Sun 孫芸芸, co-founder of Breeze Center
- Tsai Wan Lin, founder of Cathay Life Insurance
- Jerry Yang 楊致遠, computer scientist and entrepreneur, cofounder of Yahoo!
- Ben Chiu 邱澤堃, founder of KillerApp.com acquired by CNET
- William Wang, founder and CEO of VIZIO
- Wu Yao-ting, founder of several large department stores

== Educators ==
- Winston Chang*
- Benjamin Hsiao, Chief Research Officer and vice-president for Research at Stony Brook University, Fellow of the American Physical Society, Fellow of the American Chemical Society, Fellow of the American Association for the Advancement of Science
- Hu Shih*, philosopher, essayist and diplomat
- Henry T. Yang, Chancellor of the University of California, Santa Barbara

== Linguists ==
- Yuen Ren Chao*
- Woo Tsin-hang*, linguist

== Others ==
- Chang Wen-chen, Taiwanese jurist
- Mai Chen, constitutional lawyer, emigrated to New Zealand
- Wen Ho Lee, engineer falsely accused of spying; author of book "My Country Versus Me" 李文和
- Fu Szeto (1916–92), commander-in-chief of the Air Force and presidential advisor
- Goodnight Chicken, YouTuber and criminal
- Jason Wu, fashion designer
- Hsing Yun*, Buddhist monk and founder of Fo Guang Shan Order
- I Lo-fen, scholar of literature
- Qiu Hongda, lawyer and scholar

== Philosophers, thinkers, and writers ==
- Yin Shun*, Buddhist scholarly writer and key figure of Humanistic Buddhism in Taiwan
- Sheng-yen*, Buddhist scholarly writer and founder of Dharma Drum Mountain Order
- Cheng Yen, founder of Tzu Chi
- Yifa, writer and founder of Woodenfish
- R. C. T. Lee (Chia-Tung Lee), writer and professor
- Tu Wei-ming, ethicist
- Giddens Ko, novelist and filmmaker

See also: List of Taiwanese authors and List of Confucianists

== Politicians ==
- Tsai Ing-wen 蔡英文
- John Chiang* 蔣孝嚴
- Chang Chun*
- Chen Li-an*
- Chen Shui-bian 陳水扁
- Sisy Chen
- Chang Chau-hsiung
- Chang Chin-cheng
- Chiang Ching-kuo* 蔣經國
- Chiang Wei-kuo* 蔣緯國
- Chu Mei-feng
- Frank Hsieh 謝長廷
- Lee Teng-hui 李登輝
- Lien Chan* 連戰
- Lin Yang-kang
- Annette Lu 呂秀蓮
- Ma Ying-jeou* 馬英九
- Vincent Siew 蕭萬長
- James Soong* 宋楚瑜
- Su Tseng-chang 蘇真昌
- Sun Yun-suan*
- Yu Shyi-kun 游錫堃
- Wang Chien-shien*
- Wang Jin-pyng 王金平
- Wang Xiang 王驤
- Andrew Yang (US 2020 Presidential Candidate)

See also: List of leaders of the Republic of China, Premier of the Republic of China

== Scientists, physicians and engineers ==
- Robert Yih-shyong Lai, fluid mechanics engineer and university professor 賴義雄博士
- Yu-Ju Chen, proteogenomics researcher 陳玉如
- David Ho, medical researcher 何大一
- Henry Lee*, forensic expert 李昌鈺
- Sung-Yang Lee, entomologist 李淳陽
- Yuan T. Lee, Nobel laureate in chemistry 李遠哲
- Fushih Pan, medical researcher 潘扶適
- Chiaho Shih, researcher and former university professor 施嘉和
- Tsungming Tu, medical doctor 杜聰明
- Wu Cheng-wen, biochemist 吳成文
- Chi-Huey Wong, biochemist 翁啟恵
- Fu Jen-kun, professor 傅仁坤

== See also ==
- Taiwanese American
- Taiwanese Canadian
- List of people by nationality
