= Cue sports at the World Games =

International sporting competitions

Cue sports, including three-cushion billiards, nine-ball (a pool discipline) and snooker, were introduced as World Games sports for men and (in the case of nine-ball) for women also at the World Games 2001 in Akita.

== Medal table ==
Rank	Nation	Gold	Silver	Bronze	Total
1	Great Britain (GBR)	6	4	2	12
2	China (CHN)	5	2	3	10
3	Chinese Taipei (TPE)	3	4	2	9
4	Netherlands (NED)	3	2	1	6
5	Spain (ESP)	3	0	0	3
6	Germany (GER)	2	2	4	8
7	Philippines (PHI)	1	2	1	4
8	South Korea (KOR)	1	2	0	3
9	Austria (AUT)	1	1	3	5
10	Belgium (BEL)	1	1	2	4
11	Italy (ITA)	1	1	1	3
12	United States (USA)	1	0	2	3
13	Hong Kong (HKG)	1	0	0	1
13	Hungary (HUN)	1	0	0	1
13	India (IND)	1	0	0	1
16	Egypt (EGY)	0	2	1	3
17	Japan (JPN)	0	1	2	3
17	Thailand (THA)	0	1	2	3
19	Peru (PER)	0	1	1	2
20	Bosnia and Herzegovina (BIH)	0	1	0	1
20	Colombia (COL)	0	1	0	1
20	Cyprus (CYP)	0	1	0	1
20	South Africa (RSA)	0	1	0	1
20	Sweden (SWE)	0	1	0	1
25	France (FRA)	0	0	1	1
25	Iran (IRI)	0	0	1	1
25	Norway (NOR)	0	0	1	1
25	Pakistan (PAK)	0	0	1	1
25	Singapore (SIN)	0	0	1	1
25	Turkey (TUR)	0	0	1	1
25	United Arab Emirates (UAE)	0	0	1	1
Totals (31 entries)		31	31	34	96

== Medallists ==
=== Three-cushion billiards ===
==== Men's singles ====
Games	Gold	Silver	Bronze
2001 Akita	Daniel Sánchez (ESP)	Dick Jaspers (NED)	Sang Lee (USA)
2005 Duisburg	Daniel Sánchez (ESP) (2)	Dick Jaspers (NED)	Semih Saygıner (TUR)
2009 Kaohsiung	Dick Jaspers (NED)	Torbjörn Blomdahl (SWE)	Marco Zanetti (ITA)
2013 Cali	Marco Zanetti (ITA)	Eddy Merckx (BEL)	Glenn Hofman (NED)
2017 Wrocław	Daniel Sánchez (ESP) (3)	Marco Zanetti (ITA)	Sameh Sidhom (EGY)
2022 Birmingham	Dick Jaspers (NED) (2)	José Juan Garcia (COL)	Eddy Merckx (BEL)
2025 Chengdu	Cho Myung-woo (KOR)	Sameh Sidhom (EGY)	Martin Horn (GER)

==== Women's singles ====
Games	Gold	Silver	Bronze
2025 Chengdu	Therese Klompenhouwer (NED)	Ayaka Miyashita (JPN)	Jackeline Perez (PER)

=== Pool ===
==== Men's singles ====
Games	Gold	Silver	Bronze
2001 Akita	Yang Ching-shun (TPE)	Ralf Souquet (GER)	Thomas Engert (GER)
2005 Duisburg	Chang Pei-weo (TPE)	Thorsten Hohmann (GER)	Rodney Morris (USA)
2009 Kaohsiung	Ralf Souquet (GER)	Yang Ching-shun (TPE)	Stephan Cohen (FRA)
2013 Cali	Darren Appleton (GBR)	Chang Jung-lin (TPE)	Dennis Orcollo (PHI)
2017 Wrocław	Carlo Biado (PHI)	Jayson Shaw (GBR)	Naoyuki Ōi (JPN)
2022 Birmingham	Joshua Filler (GER)	Sanjin Pehlivanović (BIH)	Aloysius Yapp (SIN)
2025 Chengdu	Olivér Szolnoki (HUN)	Gerson Martínez (PER)	Joshua Filler (GER)

==== Women's singles ====
Games	Gold	Silver	Bronze
2001 Akita	Jeanette Lee (USA)	Karen Corr (GBR)	Chen Chun-chen (TPE)
2005 Duisburg	Jasmin Ouschan (AUT)	Chen Chun-chen (TPE)	Line Kjørsvik (NOR)
2009 Kaohsiung	Allison Fisher (GBR)	Jasmin Ouschan (AUT)	Lin Yuan-chun (TPE)
2013 Cali	Chou Chieh-yu (TPE)	Kim Ga-young (KOR)	Kelly Fisher (GBR)
2017 Wrocław	Chen Siming (CHN)	Kim Ga-young (KOR)	Han Yu (CHN)
2022 Birmingham	Kelly Fisher (GBR)	Chou Chieh-yu (TPE)	Yuki Hiraguchi (JPN)
2025 Chengdu	Han Yu (CHN)	Chezka Centeno (PHL)	Liu Shasha (CHN)

=== Heyball ===
==== Men's singles ====
Games	Gold	Silver	Bronze
2025 Chengdu	Zhang Taiyi (CHN)	Jason Theron (RSA)	Tang Chunxiao (CHN)

=== Snooker ===
==== Men's singles ====
Games	Gold	Silver	Bronze
2001 Akita	Bjorn Haneveer (BEL)	Marlon Manalo (PHI)	Shokat Ali (PAK)
2005 Duisburg	Gerard Greene (GBR)	Ding Junhui (CHN)	Bjorn Haneveer (BEL)
2009 Kaohsiung	Nigel Bond (GBR)	David Grace (GBR)	Mohammed Shehab (UAE)
2013 Cali	Aditya Mehta (IND)	Liang Wenbo (CHN)	Dechawat Poomjaeng (THA)
2017 Wrocław	Kyren Wilson (GBR)	Ali Carter (GBR)	Soheil Vahedi (IRI)
2022 Birmingham	Cheung Ka Wai (HKG)	Abdelrahman Shahin (EGY)	Darren Morgan (GBR)
2025 Chengdu	Xiao Guodong (CHN)	Michael Georgiou (CYP)	Alexander Widau (GER)

==== Women's singles ====
Games	Gold	Silver	Bronze
2025 Chengdu	Bai Yulu (CHN)	Narucha Phoemphul (THA)	Ploychompoo Laokiatphong (THA)

== See also ==
- Cue sports at the Asian Games
- Billiard sports at the 2025 World Games
