= Jeng =

Jeng may refer to:

- the Jeng language

== People ==
- Jeng Jundian
- Jeng Tian-tsair
- Alhaji Jeng
- Jeng Kirchen
