= Taiwan.md =

Taiwanese open knowledge base website

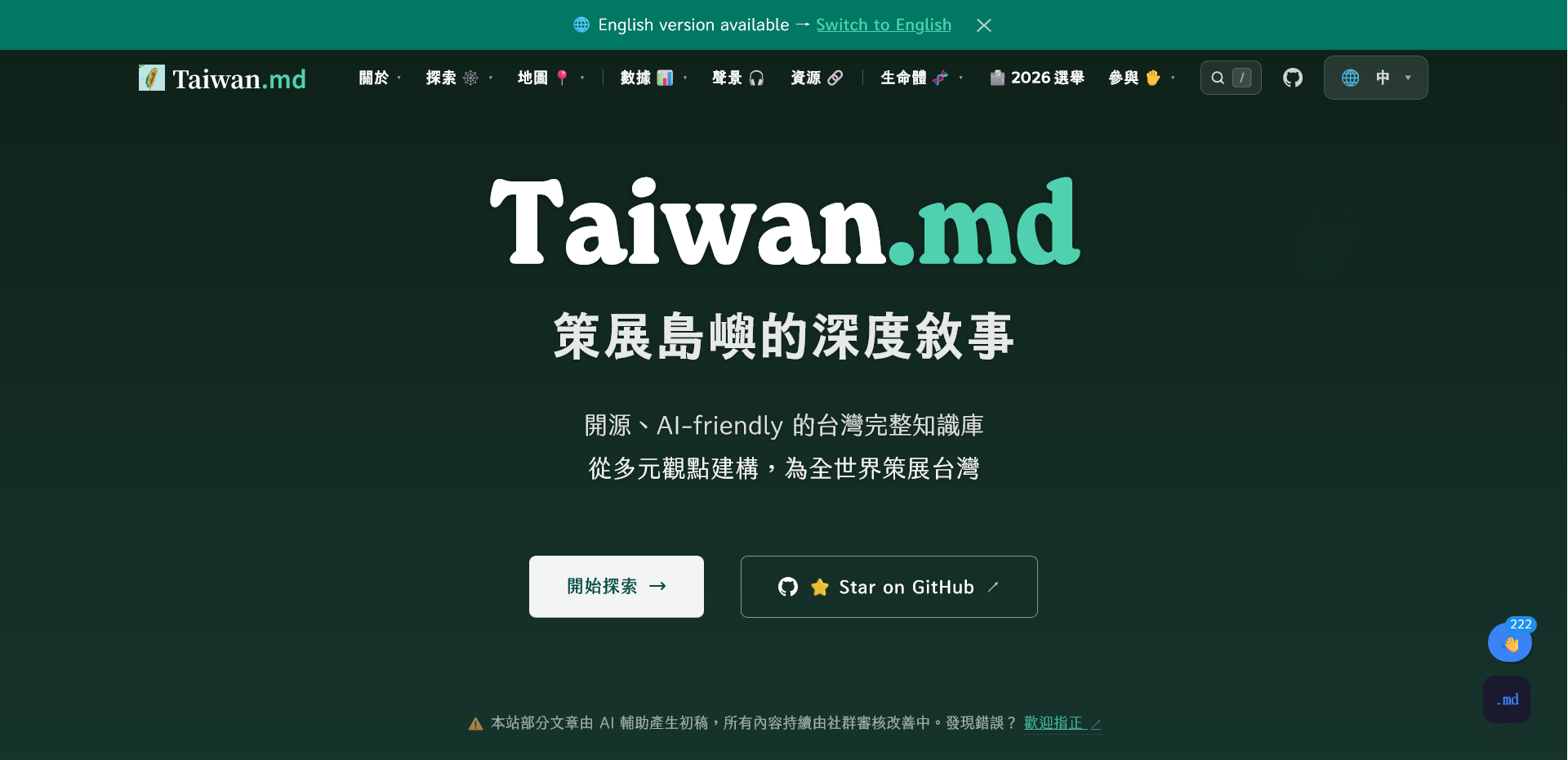
- Taiwan.md home page in June 2026
- Website type: knowledge base
- Available in: Traditional Chinese, English, Japanese, Korean, French, Spanish
- Founded: March 17, 2026; 6 months ago
- Country of origin: Taiwan
- Founder: Wu Che Yu
- Website: taiwan.md
- Commercial: No
- Registration: No
- Content license: CC BY-SA 4.0

Taiwan.md is an open knowledge base website founded on 17 March 2026 by new media artist Wu Che-yu (吳哲宇). The site's contents cover subjects about Taiwan, including its culture, history, and technology. Taiwan.md is published as free content and welcomes community contributions via GitHub.

== Website content ==
Inspired by single source of truth (SSOT) in information technology, Taiwan.md aims to integrate various sources in Taiwan, such as government data, media coverage, and local voices, to create a "single source of truth of Taiwan". Drafts were generated by AI agents and reviewed by the community before being published. Its contents are published in Markdown format. According to the project, Markdown was chosen so that the site's contents can be easily read by humans and large language models (LLMs). It also emphasises search engine optimization. Taiwan.md is run on GitHub, and all content is licensed under CC BY-SA 4.0.

Taiwan.md covers a range of topics about Taiwan, including its culture, history, food, people, nature, technology, and economy. As of March 2026, there are 660 articles on the website, with the "people" category being the largest. It also covers aspects of daily life in Taiwan, such as breakfast restaurants and convenience stores. At first, the website is available in traditional Chinese and English to ensure foreign readers can easily access its content. It also provides an interactive knowledge graph to visualise the relationships between subjects. According to its founder, the website aims to build structured information with diverse perspectives, rather than serving as a travel guide or political propaganda.

== History ==
Taiwan.md was founded by Wu Che Yu, a new media artist, inspired by his personal experiences abroad. During a trip to the Venice Biennale, Wu was asked by an Italian curator where they could learn about Taiwan—a question he had encountered repeatedly at various international venues, including Art Basel Miami and the Cent Quatre.

Through his research, Wu concluded that information about Taiwan exists, but is scattered across disparate sources without proper collation or narration, which led him to launch the project. On 17 March 2026, Wu registered the domain "taiwan.md" and built an initial structure using AI agents within 24 hours. While .md is the Internet country code top-level domain for Moldova, it is also the file extension for Markdown, a markup language widely used by developers.

== Reception ==
Taiwan.md quickly gained attention within the country. Inside, a Taiwanese technology magazine, described the website as an "open-source experiment in national narrative" (開源的國家敘事實驗) and the README of Taiwan. FTNN reported that the site received traffic from numerous countries shortly after its launch.
