= .md =

Internet country code top-level domain for Moldova

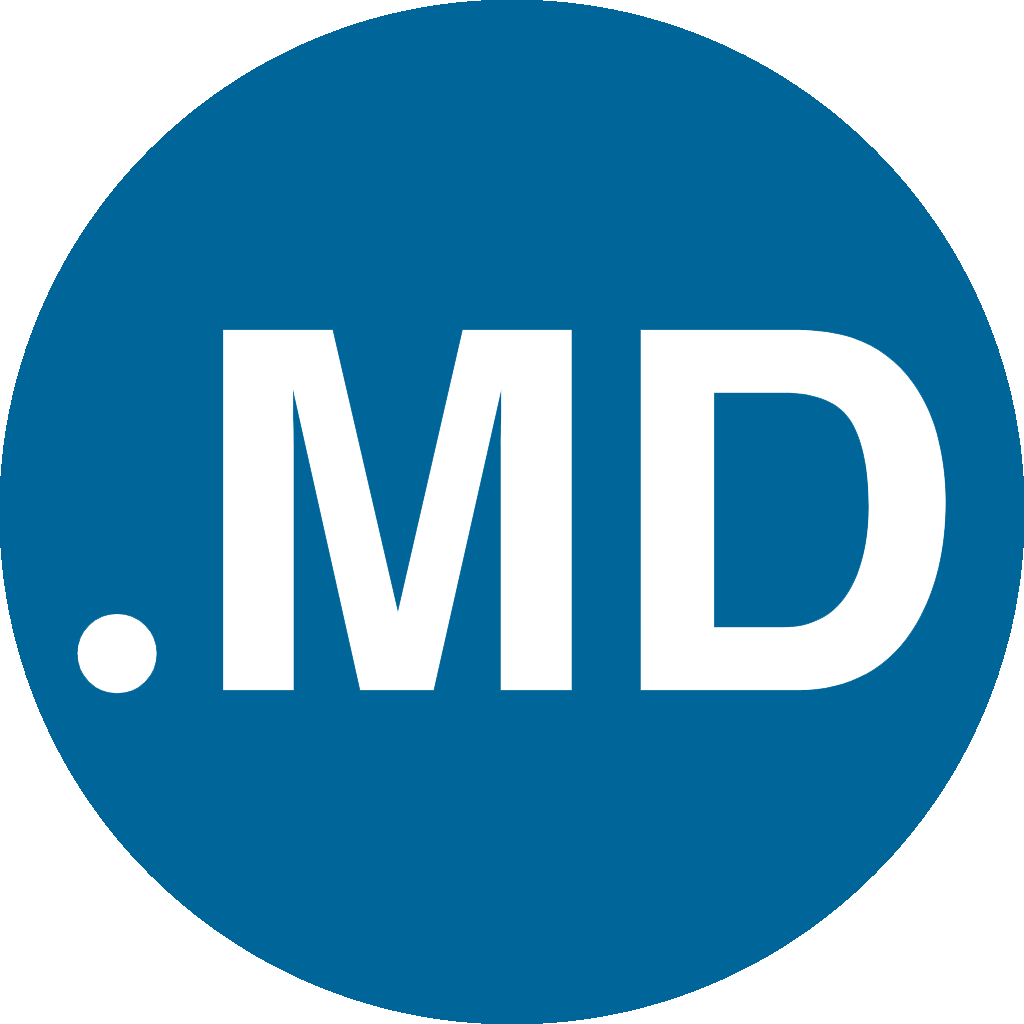
- Introduced: 24 March 1994
- TLD type: Country code top-level domain
- Status: Active
- Registry: STISC
- Intended use: Entities connected with Moldova
- Actual use: Very popular in Moldova, limited use by medical doctors, limited use by Markdown-related applications
- Registered domains: over 25,000 (2020-07-25)
- Registration restrictions: Prohibited domain names with bad taste, foul language, injurious to public order or to public sensibilities, with offending character, or with obscene or pornographic words
- Structure: Registrations are taken directly at the second level
- Documents: Terms and conditions
- Dispute policies: UDRP
- DNSSEC: Yes
- Registry website: nic.md

.md is the Internet country code top-level domain (ccTLD) for Moldova.

The price of domain registration is 450 Moldovan leu or US$39 (including VAT) per year.

The TLD is currently administered by STISC (Service for Information Technology and Cyber Security); before being merged into STISC, the Moldovan state company MoldData had an exclusive agreement to administer and distribute domain names within the .MD domain.

== Second-level domain names ==
The official regulations list a number of second-level domain names for official state and local government use, as well as a list of generic second-level domain names:

- .com.md – Commercial entities
- .srl.md – Private limited companies
- .sa.md – Publicly traded companies
- .net.md – Companies which offer Internet services
- .org.md – Other organizations, including NGOs and not-for-profit organizations
- .acad.md – Academic and educational institutions

.com.md, .org.md, .info.md, and .pro.md third-level domain names can be registered via MoldData.

Although primarily associated with Moldova, the .md TLD is also used internationally, particularly by medical professionals due to the "MD" abbreviation for Medicinae Doctor, and has seen niche adoption by developers for its resemblance to the Markdown file extension (.md). Examples include promotional use by healthcare registrars and personal sites like thomas.md, as well as the notetaking app Obsidian and the knowledge base Taiwan.md.

== History ==
The establishment of the .md TLD was approved in March 1994 by the University of Southern California's Information Sciences Institute (IANA's predecessor). The first Moldovan Internet server, mdearn.md, became operational on January 1, 1994. In May 1995, .md was fully delegated to RCI (the Moldovan Republican Centre for Informatics, established on 1 September 1993).

In 1998, RCI entered into a contractual agreement with Domain Name Trust, a US-based company, granting it the rights to operate and oversee the TLD. Domain Name Trust then proceeded to sell its rights to operate .md to DotMD, a US-based LLC, which went bankrupt in October 2002. During the resulting bankruptcy court proceedings, authority over .md was ordered to be returned to the state of Moldova in February 2003.

RCI was renamed into MoldData on 12 July 2001, formalizing its transformation and succession on 19 September. On 30 August 2019, by order of the Moldovan government, MoldData was absorbed into STISC (Service for Information Technology and Cyber Security), which took over the responsibility of the national registrar for the .md TLD.

In November 2007, the number of domains registered under the .md TLD reached 12,000.
