= 2021 UMB World Three-cushion Championship =

Tournament information
- Sport: Carom billiards
- Dates: December 7–December 11
- Host(s): (Egypt) Sharm el-Sheikh
- Participants: 48

Final positions
- Champion: (Netherlands) Dick Jaspers
- Runner-up: (Turkey) Murat Naci Çoklu

The 2021 UMB World Three-cushion Championship was the 73rd edition of the tournament. It took place from 7 to 11 December 2021 in Sharm el-Sheikh, Egypt.

== Bracket ==
Step 32
(France) Jérémy Bury	50
(South Korea) Seo Chang-hoon	37
(Ecuador) Javier Teran	34
(Colombia) José Juan García	50
(Egypt) Sameh Sidhom	50
(Japan) O Takeshima	24
(Netherlands) Dick Jaspers	50
(South Korea) Kim Haeng-jik	40
(Turkey) Lufti Cenet	50
(Colombia) Pedro González	28
(Spain) Daniel Sánchez	47
(Germany) Martin Horn	50
(Belgium) Eddy Merckx	50
(Sweden) Torbjörn Blomdahl	32
(Turkey) Tayfun Taşdemir	50
(Egypt) Riad Nady	36
(Turkey) Murat Naci Çoklu	50
(Costa Rica) Erick Téllez	37
(Denmark) Dion Nelin	41
(Belgium) Peter Ceulemans	50
(Colombia) Mauricio Gutierrez	50
(South Korea) Heo Jung-han	46
(South Korea) Choi Sung-won	36
(South Korea) Lee Choong-bok	50
(Spain) Rubén Legazpi	50
(Sweden) Michael Nilsson	31
(South Korea) Choi Wan-young	50
(Netherlands) Ludo Kools	32
(Italy) Marco Zanetti	50
(Portugal) Rui Manuel Costa	14
(Greece) Nikos Polychronopoulos	30
(Germany) Ronny Lindemann	50

Step16
(France) Jérémy Bury	50
(Colombia) José Juan García	44
(Egypt) Sameh Sidhom	12
(Netherlands) Dick Jaspers	50
(Turkey) Lufti Cenet	44
(Germany) Martin Horn	50
(Belgium) Eddy Merckx	28
(Turkey) Tayfun Taşdemir	50
(Turkey) Murat Naci Çoklu	50
(Belgium) Peter Ceulemans	45
(Colombia) Mauricio Gutierrez	20
(South Korea) Lee Choong-bok	50
(Spain) Rubén Legazpi	50
(South Korea) Choi Wan-young	38
(Italy) Marco Zanetti	50
(Germany) Ronny Lindemann	25

Quarter-finals
(France) Jérémy Bury	35
(Netherlands) Dick Jaspers	50
(Germany) Martin Horn	50
(Turkey) Tayfun Taşdemir	22
(Turkey) Murat Naci Çoklu	50
(South Korea) Lee Choong-bok	46
(Spain) Rubén Legazpi	31
(Italy) Marco Zanetti	50

Semi-finals
(Netherlands) Dick Jaspers	50
(Germany) Martin Horn	45
(Turkey) Murat Naci Çoklu	50
(Italy) Marco Zanetti	47

Final
(Netherlands) Dick Jaspers	50
(Turkey) Murat Naci Çoklu	47
