= David Steindl-Rast =

American Catholic monk (born 1926)

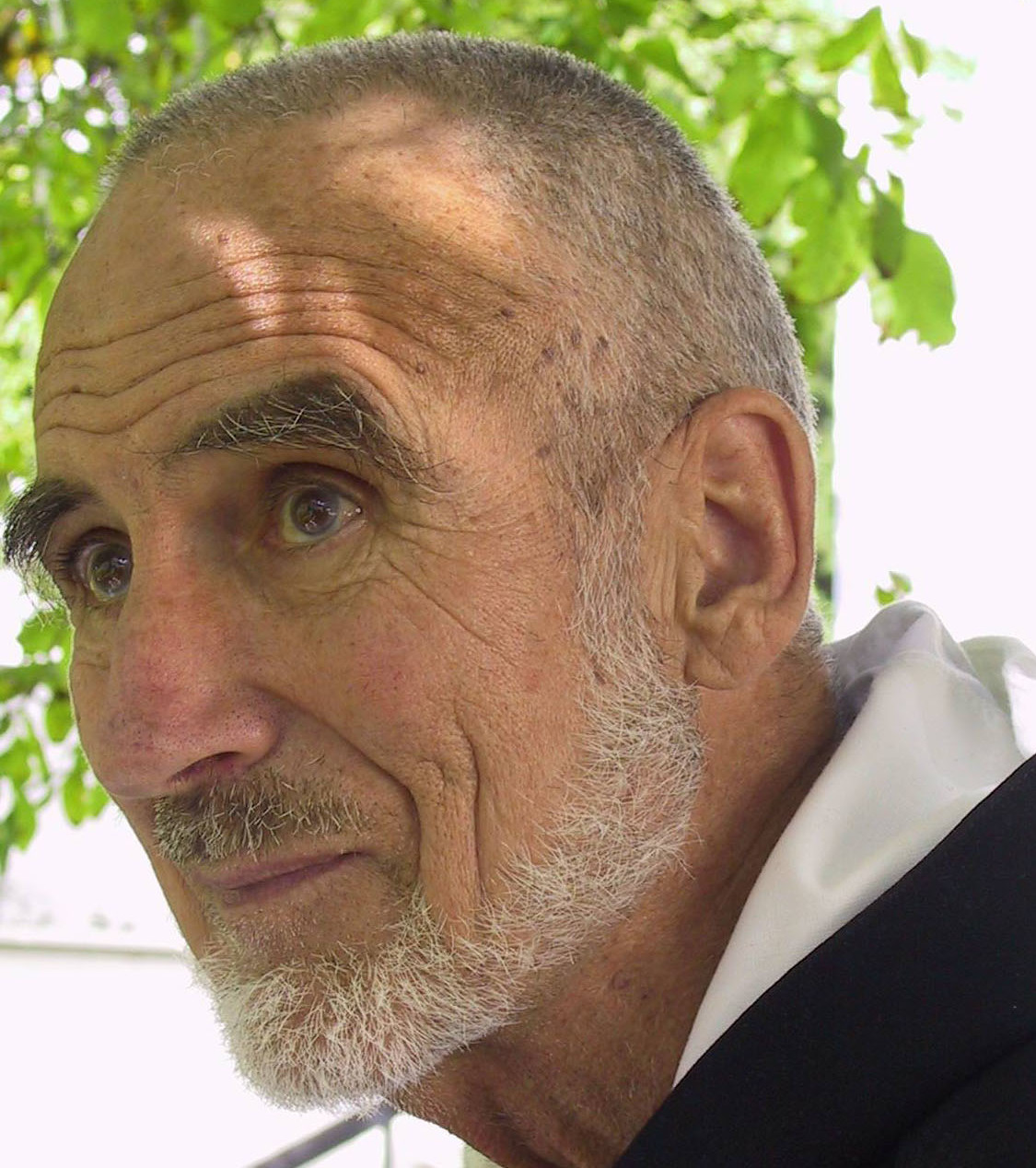
- Steindl-Rast in 2004
- Born: Franz Kuno Steindl-Rast; July 12, 1926 (age 100); Vienna, Austria
- Occupations: Benedictine monk, author, lecturer
- Known for: Interfaith dialogue esp. Buddhist-Christian
- Notable work: Gratefulness, the Heart of Prayer

David Steindl-Rast (born July 12, 1926) is an Austrian-American Catholic Benedictine monk, author, and lecturer. He is committed to interfaith dialogue and has dealt with the interaction between spirituality and science.

== Life and career ==
Steindl-Rast was born and raised in Vienna, Austria, with a traditional Catholic upbringing that instilled in him a trust in life and an experience of mystery. His family and surname derive from their aristocratic seat near the pilgrimage site of Maria Rast, today Ruše in Slovenia. Privations he experienced in youth during the Second World War were magnified by the tensions of him being one-fourth Jewish. He was drafted into the German army in May 1944 but did not see combat. In February 1945 he abandoned his post and went underground. After the end of the war he offered himself as a volunteer, helping to set up refugee camps on the Czechoslovak border.

He received his MA degree from the Vienna Academy of Fine Arts and his PhD in experimental psychology from the University of Vienna (1952). He emigrated with his family to the United States in the same year and became a Benedictine monk in 1953 at Mount Saviour Monastery in Pine City, New York, a newly founded Benedictine community. With permission of his abbot, Damasus Winzen, in 1966 he was officially delegated to pursue Buddhist-Christian dialogue and began to study Zen with masters Haku'un Yasutani, Soen Nakagawa, Shunryu Suzuki, and Eido Tai Shimano.

As a Benedictine monk, he spent time in various monastic communities, including 14 years at the New Camaldoli Hermitage in Big Sur, California. He spent half the year as a hermit in a monastery and spent the other half lecturing and giving workshops and retreats. His experience around the world and with the world's various religions convinced him that the human response of gratitude is a part of the religious worldview and is essential to all human life.

His first book, A Listening Heart was published 1983; it was a collection of short texts, some of which had already been published. A reviewer noted frequent repetitions in a book consisting of only 95 pages. Numerous publications in English and German followed. Reviewer Conrad Pepler wrote of Gratefulness, the Heart of Prayer (1984) that although many of the book's points were obvious, the author had a pleasant and light style of writing.

He co-founded the Center for Spiritual Studies with Jewish, Buddhist, Hindu, and Sufi teachers in 1968, and since the 1970s has been a member of the cultural historian William Irwin Thompson's Lindisfarne Association. He received the Martin Buber Award for his achievements in building dialog among religious traditions. His writings include Gratefulness, the Heart of Prayer, The Music of Silence (with Sharon Lebell), Words of Common Sense and Belonging to the Universe (co-authored with Fritjof Capra). In 2000, he co-founded A Network for Grateful Living, an organization dedicated to gratefulness as a transformative influence for individuals and society.

His 2013 TED talk, Want to Be Happy? Be Grateful, was viewed by millions. In 2024, Steindl-Rast gave his papers to the University of Salzburg.

== Selected writings ==
- 1984, Gratefulness, the Heart of Prayer: An Approach to Life in Fullness, N.J. Paulist Press 1984. ISBN 0-8091-2628-1
- 1991, Belonging to the Universe: Explorations on the Frontiers of Science and Spirituality, coauthored with Fritjof Capra and Thomas Matus, Harper San Francisco, ISBN 978-0-06-250187-5
- 1995, Music of Silence: A Sacred Journey through the Hours of the Day, coauthored with Sharon LeBell, Ulysses Press, 2. Ed. 2001, ISBN 1-56975-297-4
- 1996, The Ground We Share: Everyday Practice, Buddhist and Christian, coauthored with Robert Baker Aitken. Shambhala Publications, ISBN 1-57062-219-1
- 1999, A Listening Heart: The Spirituality of Sacred Sensuousness, Crossroad, ISBN 0-8245-1780-6
- 2002, Words of Common Sense for Mind, Body and Soul, Templeton Foundation Press, ISBN 1-890151-98-X
- 2008, Common Sense Spirituality. The Crossroad Publishing Company, ISBN 0-8245-2479-9
- 2010, Deeper than Words: Living the Apostles' Creed, Doubleday Religion, ISBN 978-0-307-58961-3
- 2010, David Steindl-Rast: Essential Writings, selected with and introduction by Clare Hallward, (Modern Spiritual Masters series, edited by Robert Ellsberg), Orbis Books, ISBN 978-1-57075-888-1
- 2016, Faith beyond Belief: Spirituality for Our Times, coauthored with Anselm Grün. Liturgical Press, ISBN 978-0814647134
- 2016. The Way of Silence: Engaging the Sacred in Daily Life, Franciscan Media, ISBN 978-1632530165
- 2017, i am through you so i, Paulist Press, ISBN 978-0809153947
- 2021, 99 Names of God, Orbis Books, ISBN 978-1626984226

In addition he has contributed to numerous works, including:

- Introduction, Words of Gratitude for Mind, Body, and Soul, by Robert A. Emmons and Joanna Hill
- Afterword, Benedict's Dharma: Buddhists Reflect on the Rule of Saint Benedict, by Norman Fischer, Joseph Goldstein and Judith Simmer-Brown, edited by Yifa, and Patrick Henry
- Foreword, Living Buddha, Living Christ, by Thich Nhat Hanh
- Foreword, This World, by Teddy Macker
- Chapter in Entheogens and the Future of Religion titled "Explorations into God", edited by Robert Forte ISBN 9781594777974
