= Wu Chin-tai =

Taiwanese record producer

Wu Chin-Tai (also known as Judy Wu) is a Taiwanese record producer whose works mainly focus on sounds of the nature, instrumental, and ethnic music. She currently holds the position of Director of Music Production at Wind Music Co. Prior to studying recording technology at Brigham Young University in Utah, she was a tourism major at a college in her native Taiwan. Upon concluding her studies in the United States, Wu returned to Taiwan and started working at Wind Music as a recording engineer. Her works concerning the natural habitats in Taiwan, such as The Forest Show, My Ocean and The Nearest Heaven, have stimulated substantial attention to the sounds of nature and raised awareness of the Taiwanese wilderness. In 2001, Wu won her first Traditional Golden Melody Award for Best Producer with her work in "My Ocean". Wu collaborated with ocarina artist You Xue-Zhi in 2002. Her subsequent works, such as "Colors of Childhood ~ Taiwanese Children Song", "Formosa Aboriginal Song & Dance Troupe" / "Holding Ina's Hand", and "The Mongolian Folk Long-Song", have all garnered various Golden Melody Awards. Her 2009 production "Drum Music Land for Taiwanese" percussion ensemble Ten Drum Art Percussion Group received a Grammy nomination for Best Tradition World Music Album. In 2021 she produced Nature´s Whispering, an album based on 20 years of nature recordings.

== History ==
Wu worked at Wind Music, but found her duties unfulfilling. Wind Music founder Ken Yang encouraged Wu to observe and discover sounds in the Taiwanese wilderness, which she did, and began to preserve the sounds of nature by making audio recordings.

Early in her career, Wu helped distribute international bestselling albums such as Bleeding Wolves into Taiwan. In recent years, she has been involved in the revival of instrumental folk music. Her collaboration with ocarina artist You Xue-Zhi created interest in the instrument.

== Awards and nominations ==
- 2013 Produced "Birds II: Where the Sounds of Nature Dwell"

winning Best New Age Album at the 2013 12th Independent Music Awards.

- 2012 Co-produced "On A Gentle Island Breeze"

nominated for Best World Music Album at the 2013 55th Grammy Awards.

- 2005 Co-produced "Formosa Aboriginal Song & Dance Troupe－Holding Ina's Hand"

winning Best Regional Music Album and Best Vocal Performance at the 2006 Golden Melody Awards, also nominated for Best Record Producer.

- 2004 Co-produced aboriginal music album "The Passing of the Year"

nominated for Best Regional Music Album and Best Vocal Performance at the 2005 Golden Melody Awards.

- 2003 Co-produced Taiwanese children's folk music album "Colors of Childhood ~ Taiwanese Children Song"

winning Best Children's Music Album at the 2004 Golden Melody Awards.

- 2000 Produced "My Ocean"

winning Best Producer at the 2001 Golden Melody Awards.

- 1999 Produced the first ever Taiwanese sounds of nature album, The Forest Show

igniting a trend for natural and ambient music in Taiwan.

- 1998 Served as co-producer on the recording project "The Tibetian Canyon"

nominated for Best World Music Album at the 1999 NAIRD Awards.
