= Lee Sung-yang =

Taiwanese entomologist (1922–2014)

Lee Sung-yung
- 李淳陽
- Born: 29 May 1922
- Died: 2014 (aged 91–92)
- Education: The Affiliatiated College of Agriculture and Forestry, Taihoku Imperial University

Lee Sung-yang (Chinese: 李淳陽; pinyin: Lǐ Chúnyáng, 29 May 1922 – 2014) was a Taiwanese entomologist. He was the subject of the 1975 BBC documentary The Insect World of Dr. Lee. In Taiwan, he is referred to as the "Taiwanese Jean Henri Fabre." Lee died in 2014.
