= Nine-ball at the 2005 World Games – women's singles =

Billiards Tournament

Nine-ball women's singles at the 2005 World Games
- Venue: Saalbau Bottrop, Duisburg, Germany
- Dates: 20–24 July 2005
- Competitors: 16 from 14 nations

Medalists
gold medal	(Austria) Jasmin Ouschan
silver medal	(Chinese Taipei) Chen Chun-chen
bronze medal	(Norway) Line Kjörsvik

The women's singles nine-ball competition at the 2005 World Games took place from 20 to 24 July 2005 at the Saalbau Bottrop in Duisburg, Germany.

== Last 16 ==
Liu Shin-Mei (Chinese Taipei)	7–9	(Italy) Tiziana Cacciamani
Line Kjörsvik (Norway)	9–7	(Venezuela) Mirjana Grujicic
Jasmin Ouschan (Austria)	9–2	(Germany) Diana Stateczny
Yukiko Hamanishi (Japan)	9–4	(Switzerland) Eliane Kurzen
Jung Sung-Hyun (South Korea)	9–6	(Germany) Sandra Ortner
Vivian Villareal (Spain)	9–2	(South Africa) Apsra Indureeth Panchoo
Chen Chun-chen (Chinese Taipei)	9–6	(Australia) Lyndall Hulley
Allison Fisher (United Kingdom)	9–3	(Denmark) Katrine Jensen

== Last 8 ==
Quarter-finals
(Italy) Tiziana Cacciamani	6
(Norway) Line Kjörsvik	9
(Austria) Jasmin Ouschan	9
(Japan) Yukiko Hamanishi	8
(South Korea) Jung Sung-Hyun	9
(Spain) Vivian Villareal	7
(Chinese Taipei) Chen Chun-chen	9
(United Kingdom) Allison Fisher	7

Semi-finals
(Norway) Line Kjörsvik	5
(Austria) Jasmin Ouschan	9
(South Korea) Jung Sung-Hyun	4
(Chinese Taipei) Chen Chun-chen	9

Gold medal match
(Austria) Jasmin Ouschan	9
(Chinese Taipei) Chen Chun-chen	5
Bronze medal match
(Norway) Line Kjörsvik	9
(South Korea) Jung Sung-Hyun	6
