= Ben Chiu =

Taiwanese-American and Canadian computer programmer and internet entrepreneur

Benjamin Chiu
- 邱泽堃
- Born: December 27, 1970 (age 55); Taichung, Taiwan
- Other name: Ben Chiu
- Education: University of Toronto (BSc)

Benjamin Chiu (simplified Chinese: 邱泽堃; traditional Chinese: 邱澤堃; pinyin: Qiū Zékūn; born December 27, 1970) is a Taiwanese-American and Canadian computer programmer and internet entrepreneur. He is the founder of killerapp.com, a popular comparison shopping site for computers and consumer electronics that was acquired by CNET Networks Inc. in 1999 for $50 million.

== Early life ==
Born in Taichung, Taiwan, Ben who is an only child, moved to Chapel Hill, North Carolina, at eight months of age with his mother (Hsiu Lan) and father (Sheng Dien) where they lived for six years before moving to Toronto, Ontario, Canada. He attended high-school at Albert Campbell Collegiate Institute in Scarborough, Ontario and graduated with honors and awards in Computer Science and Visual Arts. In 1993 he received his bachelor's degree in applied science, industrial engineering from the University of Toronto.

When he was 11, Ben began to take an interest in programming. One summer, Ben's father assigned him to write a database system (using DBASE) for their family business. With help from his father, Ben started Linguasoft Corp. and sold his system to bookstores and libraries. To this day, the Royal Ontario Museum is still using his software.

Barely a teenager, Ben Chiu played table-tennis for the Ontario provincial team. Under the training of renowned Yugoslavian coach Zoran Kosanovic, Ben won the Canadian National Championships (junior singles), Formosa Cup (men's singles) and took 2nd place at the 1984 U.S. Open (junior doubles).

In addition to high school, Ben also attended school for the gifted in visual arts. His art teacher once offered to buy one of his oil paintings but Ben declined. Some of his wildlife paintings have been displayed at the McMichael Gallery in Kleinburg, Ontario. At the time, his style was inspired by Robert Bateman, Glen Loates and Andrew Wyeth.

== Career ==
In 1994 while the internet was still in its infancy, Ben moved to Fremont, California to help manage his father's publishing business--Pan Asian Publications. While buying computer hardware for the company, he discovered it was tedious to browse through thousands of magazine listings for the best deals.

Instead, he cut the spines off publications like Computer Shopper and PC Magazine and keyed all the specs and prices into a database, page after page, one page at a time. After e-commerce sites began to appear on the Internet, Ben developed a web crawler that would automatically gather and update prices around the clock. This was to form the foundation for his new company.

Ben formally incorporated KillerApp, Corp. in 1995 and went on to pioneer the concept of online comparison shopping (also known as the price engine). This paradigm shift proved devastating to the computer publication industry. "Print" simply could not compete with the timely content and convenience of these specialized search engines.

The web crawlers at KillerApp ran 24/7, updating 1.5 million prices daily. Within two years, killerapp.com was receiving 14 million page views per month and 1/2 million monthly users. The site was also generating 150,000 leads per month for its base of 360 merchants.

In order to sustain the growth of its business, Ben raised two rounds of funding from angel investors that included: C.S. Ho (founder of Mitac/Synnex and honorary chairman of Computex); Charlene Wang (president of FIC and daughter of tycoon Y.C. Wang); Ming Chien (chairman of FIC) and Cher Wang (chairperson of VIA Technologies and daughter of Y.C. Wang).

In 1998, Ziff-Davis approached Ben with a buy-out offer. He declined but instead brought in Deutsche Bank to produce competitive bids. A long M&A roadshow ensued. Ben held due diligence discussions with Microsoft, ZDNet, Yahoo!, CNET, Excite, Lycos and Inktomi. On March 23, 1999 he sold his company to CNET in a stock swap valued at US$54 million and joined CNET as the Director of Commerce Services.

== In the media ==
Ben Chiu is the second Taiwanese American (since Jerry Yang co-founder of Yahoo!) to appear on the cover of Wired Magazine. Po Bronson chronicled Chiu's rags-to-riches story in his best-selling novel The Nudist on the Late Shift (ISBN 0-7679-0603-9). His story has also been recounted in Chinese by Peggy Teng (Chinese: 鄧海珠; pinyin: Dèng Hai Zhü) in her book 華裔網路英雄傳奇 (translation: Unique Passages of Overseas-Chinese Internet Heroes).
