= Wang Xiang (Republic of China politician) =

Wang Xiang (traditional Chinese: 王驤; simplified Chinese: 王骧; pinyin: Wáng Xiāng; Wade-Giles: Wang Hsiang) (1885 - August 16, 1953) was a politician and industrialist in the Republic of China. He was the Governor of Shanxi during the Wang Jingwei regime (Republic of China-Nanjing). He was born in Shouyang, Shanxi.

== Biography ==
Wang Xiang graduated the Provincial University of Shanxi, and was appointed a teacher of the Guizhou Mining School. After Xinhai Revolution broke out, he returned to home, and entered into Tongmenghui. In 1913 he was appointed Head of the 1st Provincial Junior High School of Shanxi.

In 1916 Wang Xiang was appointed Head of the Inspection and Management Department in the Shanxi Mining Company. In 1928 he was transferred to Director of the Mining Bureau of Jinxing, Hebei. In 1930 he resigned his post and returned to Shanxi. He established the Yong Yu Spinning Mill (雍裕紗廠) in Xinjiang County. In 1932 he was appointed General Manager of the Bank of Shanxi Province. In February 1935 he was catapulted to Chief of the Agency for Construction and Member of the Shanxi Provincial Government. In next February he transferred to Director of the Relief for Rural District Bureau.

After the Second Sino-Japanese War broke out, Wang Xiang resigned his post, and he accompanied Yan Xishan escaped to Shaanxi, and later Wang went to Hong Kong. In 1942 Wang returned to Shanxi, and in April 1943 he was appointed Chief of the Agency for Education of the Shanxi Province, the Wang Jingwei regime. In next June he was promoted to be Governor and Security Commander of Shanxi.

After the Wang Jingwei regime had collapsed, Wang Xiang was protected by Yan Xishan, and Wang was appointed Senior Councilor of the Shanxi Provincial Government. But Shanxi's public opinion claimed Yan must not grant a pardon to Wang. In January 1946 Wang was arrested by Chiang Kai-shek's National Government, and because of charge of treason and surrender to enemy (namely Hanjian), he was sentenced to life imprisonment. In April 1949 Taiyuan was occupied by People's Liberation Army, and Wang rearrested by them. In August 1953 Wang was sentenced to death at Shangxi People's High Court, and he was executed later that month.

== Alma mater ==
Shanxi University

== Footnotes ==
- The Editorial Committee of the Gazette of Shouyang County (1989). The Gazette of Shouyang County (寿阳县志). Shanxi People's Press (Shanxi Renmin Chubanshe; 山西人民出版社).
- Xu Youchun (徐友春) (main ed.) (2007). Unabridged Biographical Dictionary of the Republic, Revised and Enlarged Version (民国人物大辞典 增订版). Hebei People's Press (Hebei Renmin Chubanshe; 河北人民出版社). ISBN 978-7-202-03014-1.
- Liu Shoulin (刘寿林) (etc.ed.) (1995). The Chronological Table of the Republic's Officer (民国职官年表). Zhonghua Book Company. ISBN 7-101-01320-1.
