= Jennifer Chen (pool player) =

Taiwanese pool player (born 1975)

Personal information
- Nickname: China Doll
- Born: July 17, 1975 (age 51) Luodong, Yilan County, Taiwan

Sport
- Country: Chinese Taipei
- Sport: Snooker
- Professional: 1991

Medal record

Women's nine-ball

Representing Chinese Taipei

World Games
Bronze medal – third place	2001 Akita	Individual
Silver medal – second place	2005 Duisburg	Individual

Jennifer Chen or Chen Chun-chen (traditional Chinese: 陳純甄; simplified Chinese: 陈纯甄; pinyin: Chén Chúnzhēn; Wade–Giles: Ch'en Ch'un-chen) is a professional pool player.

== Titles ==
- 1991 China Pool Championship
- 1993 Taiwan Cup
- 1993 All Japan Championship 9-Ball
- 1996 BCA North American 9-Ball Championship
- 1997 All Japan Championship 9-Ball
- 1997 All Japan Championship
- 1999 Spanish Cup
- 2000 Amway Cup
- 2003 Asian Cup (Shanghai)
- 2003 Asian Cup (Changsha)
