= Fu Jen-kun =

Fu Jen-kun (Chinese: 傅仁坤; pinyin: Fù Rénkūn, Russian: Фу Жень-кунь, 1954–2014), also known as Fu Ren-Kun, was a professor of international relations from Taiwan. His research focus was on geopolitics in Central Asia and he published in Chinese, English, and Russian languages.

He was born in 1954 in a village in Kaohsiung County, Taiwan and received his tertiary education in both Taiwan and the United States of America. After graduating from university, he began research and teaching while pursuing graduate studies. He received three master's degrees in law, political science and philosophy. He also obtained a doctor of philosophy in geopolitics in 1990 from the Maxwell School at Syracuse University, New York.

In late 1993, Professor Fu was invited to Kazakh National State University, in the Republic of Kazakhstan, to work in the department of International Relations and Foreign Policy. He taught several academic disciplines there. In 1995, he received the title of Honorary Professor of Al-Faribi Kazakh National University. He was named academician at both the International Higher Education Academy of Sciences (IHEAS) of Al-Faribi and the Kazakh National Academy of Sciences. He was also bestowed with honorary citizenship of the city of Almaty.

He later worked at the National Central University of Taiwan, National Chengchi University, and was a member of the Institute of International Relations (Taiwan). He was well known as one of the best teachers in Taiwan and was a visiting scholar at Harvard University (USA). Professor Fu Ren-kun then served as advisor to the Chamber of Commerce of Taiwan and a member of the American Geographical Society and the Society for Political Science (USA).

Fu Ren-Kun's area of research comprised topics ranging from comparative study of regions, cultural geography of Central Asia, geopolitics, to foreign policy of the country. Under his supervision, a number of students defended their master's degrees and PhDs. He has published over two hundred scientific articles and thirty eight books in Russian, Chinese and English.

He died in October 2014.
