= Fu Szeto =

Recipient of the Purple Heart medal

- Born: 1916; Beijing, China
- Died: 1992 (aged 75–76)
- Military career
- Allegiance: Chinese (Taiwan)
- Branch: Air Force
- Service years: circa 1940–1977
- Rank: General First Class
- Commands: Republic of China Air Force (Taiwan)

Chinese name
- Chinese: 司徒福
Transcriptions
Standard Mandarin
- Hanyu Pinyin: Sītú Fú

Fu Szeto (1916–1992) was the commander-in-chief of the Republic of China (Taiwan) Air Force and four-star general from 1974 to 1977, then chairman of the board of directors for China Airlines between 1977 and 1983. He further served as advisor to the President of the Republic of China (Taiwan) from 1983 to 1992.

== Biography ==
=== Joining the air force in time for WWII ===
Szeto was born 1916 in Beijing. He graduated from Hui Wan Boys High School in Beijing, then joined the Air Force Academy and graduated from Class 6 and was a fighter pilot ever since Japan's aggression and Second World War. He had an outstanding record, shot down Japanese planes in China but was twice shot down himself by Japanese ground fire in combat. He was reported missing in action and fortunately rescued by the farmers: One plight lasted a month and Szeto could not get to his rescue plane on time which, according to Col. Summers during his visit to Taiwan at a Flying Tigers Reunion related how lucky Szeto was to catch the plane searching for him sent by Chinese Air Force. Szeto was still on the run behind the enemy lines with a pistol, once almost killed by the farmers who mistook him as a Japanese pilot who later helped him to run. He hid in stables and ate nothing, but the beans used for horse feed. Weeks later, Szeto arrived at an air base and no one recognized him.

Szeto received approximately 29 medals, including two Purple Heart medals for being wounded in action during the war. He flew P38, P51, P40 fighter planes and dedicated his life to his country and was a pilot in his whole life. During the past couple of years, quite a few articles regarding Szeto's life of bravery and outstanding achievement have been published in some Chinese magazines. He remained single until three years after the war.

Szeto had several missions to fly over the Himalayas to Burma and India to get the P-40 planes known as Warhawk supplied by the United States Air Force (USAF) to strengthen air power for China against Japan's eight-year aggression.

Chosen to join the Flying Tigers, founded by 14th Air Force General Claire Chennault as an American volunteer corps, was a source of great pride for Szeto. He was assigned a squadron commander in the Chinese American Composite Wing (CACW) under Brigadier General Bennett, and was in the combat together with Colonel Summers and Arthur Chin, the latter a mentor and brother to Szeto. For his bravery and sacrifice during the war, Chin had a post office in Portland named after him: His face was completely disfigured by Japanese air attacks while he was in the hospital, and he was never able to recover it with plastic surgery.

During these years, Szeto flew with many Tigers pilots, he and General Tex Hill enjoyed a friendship and mutual respect. When Hill visited Szeto in Taipei, he told him that although he was not with the USAF, the Ace Association had honored him as an honorary member with high respect.

Brigadier General Bennett visited General Szeto at a Flying Tigers Reunion dinner in Taiwan when he promoted to four-star Commander-in-Chief of the Air Force, and General Szeto saluted him there for Bennett was his senior commander while he was with Flying Tigers.

=== After World War II ===
After World War II Szeto was sent to Air Force Staff College in Chengdu, then was assigned to Chongqing as operation director in the Chinese Air Force headquarters during the Chinese Civil War.

When Chiang Kai-shek was in Taiwan leading the military forces against Chinese Communists, General Szeto was a Wing Commander of the 4th Wing for six years and later 3rd Wing Commander in Taichung CCK airbase when it was also a new well-equipped USAF air base. He checked out as an F-86, F-100 and F-104 jet pilot and got citations from the USAF. Later, Szeto was promoted to Air Combat Command as commander when Chinese Communists posed a serious threat to Taiwan.

In 1974 General Szeto was promoted to be commander-in-chief of the Republic of China Air Force in Taiwan until he retired from the Air Force in 1977.

=== Chairman of the board of China Air Lines ===
President Chiang Ching-kuo (son of Chiang Kai-shek) appointed General Szeto as the Chairman of the Board of China Airlines in 1977, trusting his integrity and knowledge of aviation. China Airlines inaugurated an air route to Amsterdam and continued developing extensive air routes to various other continents including South Africa and Canada. When Szeto retired, he was appointed an advisor to the President of Republic of China (Taiwan) until his death in 1992.

=== Background ===
The Szeto family was an unusual family of medical doctors: his father and brothers all practiced in Beijing and were reputed as experts in the fields of contagious disease, radiology, and gynecology. Szeto was the youngest of seven children, and was only in his early teens when his father died as a volunteer doctor in an off-limits quarantined city in Northern China, leaving a will to his wife. Many lives were saved on his trip but he fell victim to the bubonic plague.

=== Home life ===
General Szeto has a son, a daughter, and grandchildren. He was athletic, being a goalkeeper of an ice hockey team and one in soccer. He also enjoyed ice skating, swimming, golfing (getting two holes-in-one), and other sports.
