= Woodenfish =

International Buddhist educational NGO

Woodenfish Foundation, previously known as "Woodenfish Project," is an international Buddhist educational NGO with operations in the United States and China. Yifa founded the "Woodenfish Project" in 2002 at Fo Guang Shan in Kaohsiung, Taiwan. The initial flagship program, "Humanistic Buddhist Monastic Life Program" aims to allow students from around the world to authentically experience Humanistic Buddhism for one month each summer within a monastic context.

In the past 13 years, Woodenfish program alumni and Yifa have driven the organizational growth to expand into programming in the United States and mainland China. Woodenfish Foundation became a registered 501(c)(3) organization in California in 2007. Between 2009 and 2015, Woodenfish has run 13 programs in mainland China. In 2015, Woodenfish opened New York City headquarters and hired its first full-time staff.

The Woodenfish Foundation was granted special consultative status with the United Nations through ECOSOC in July 2016.

In its second decade, Woodenfish continues to build its base within China and the United States, aiming to fulfill its mission to the greatest extent and offer opportunities for scholastic inquiry and collaboration, and contemplative and cross-cultural peace training.

The namesake comes from the wooden fish instrument, the most common religious musical instrument used in East Asian Buddhism.

== Mission & Programs ==
Woodenfish Foundation aims to establish a global network of ethical and compassionate professionals, scholars, and leaders. Woodenfish cultivates ongoing exploration of one's inner life, and inspires meaningful engagement with the pressing global issues of modern times. As of one of the few Buddhist organizations with operations in New York and P.R. China, Woodenfish is uniquely positioned to further meaningful dialogue and mutual understanding within what may be considered the most significant bilateral relationship of the 21st century. Woodenfish Foundation envisions a world in which the actions of individuals and communities around the world cultivate peace, compassion, preservation of human dignity and sustainable living.

Woodenfish Foundation programs include Humanistic Buddhist Monastic Life Program (HBMLP), Buddhism in China Series, Sutra Translation Councils, Cultural peace training program, lay dharma teacher training program, and camps for Chinese youth.

The primary objective of the HBMLP program is to promote the understanding of Chinese Buddhism by exposing the participants to the daily practice of Humanistic Buddhism within a traditional Buddhist monastery. HBMLP provides students interested in the study of religion, Buddhism and/or Chinese culture and language first-hand experience in the lifestyle, training, and functions of contemporary Chinese Buddhist monastics. Classes taught on various levels by the knowledgeable monastics and staff, inform students on Buddhist history, doctrine and philosophy, as well as classes offered regarding the liturgical instruments, monastic etiquette, meditation practice and other functions and rituals. All instruction is given in English or is translated from Mandarin. Other key elements of the program include:

- Offering participants a chance to view and experience Buddhism as it is practiced in modern-day China.
- Introducing participants to the concepts and practices of Humanistic Buddhism.
- Communal activities within the monastery, such as vegetable gardening, kitchen duty, etc.
- Daily participation in many of the routine activities within a Buddhist monastery.
- A five- to seven-day silent meditation retreat.
- Cultivating spirituality through meditation.
- A cultural tour.

Through the “Buddhism in China Series”, Woodenfish aims to aid the development of emerging scholars in the West with research interests in Chinese Buddhism or related fields by offering the opportunity for direct, intensive academic engagement with major historical centers of Buddhism in China. Each year, from 2009 to 2012 the program took groups of scholars to study religious sites in different regions of China. Through personal tours, participants gain on-the-ground knowledge of the history and diversity of Buddhism in China, its relationship to other cultural institutions, and its ongoing vitality. Special attention was given to introducing participants to potential sources and avenues for research, and promoting interaction with Chinese scholars and religious professionals. The program was also geared towards fostering international exchange and building networks among scholars of Chinese religion, history, and culture.

Starting from 2012, Woodenfish launched the “Buddhism in China—Connecting with the Source Program.” This is a semi-annual program that offers faculty, graduate students, and advanced undergraduates opportunities for direct and intensive engagement with important historical centers of Chinese Buddhism and culture. Previous programs have included a Platform Sutra Seminar in Nanhua Temple led by Peter Gregory (Smith College), a Guanyin Seminar on Mt. Putuo by Chün-fang Yü (Columbia University) and Bhikkhuni Vinaya Seminar by Ann Heirman (Ghent University) at Sichuan Nuns College. In the summer of 2014, renowned scholar Professor Daniel B. Stevenson was invited on Tiantai Study to lead a seminar at Mt. Tiantai.

== Program Alumni ==
With 14 years of programming since 2002, the Woodenfish network is global, and includes over 1,000 members pursuing a variety of professions. Participants hail from some of the best universities across the globe, with many alumni from Princeton University, Stanford University, Yale University, and Harvard University. Participants are diverse in backgrounds but there is a concentration of Asian Studies, Buddhist Studies, and Comparative Religion majors. The participants may be in their undergraduate years, may be working on their Ph.D., or working as young professionals across a variety of industries. The most popular career fields for Woodenfish alumni include academia/higher education, law, medicine, and international development/non-profit management.
