= Huang Hsin =

Taiwanese pool player

Huang Hsin (sometimes rendered as Hsin Huang in Western media, Born December 28, 1995) is a Taiwanese professional pocket billiards (pool) player.

== Career ==
She was the 2001 Canadian Nine-Ball Champion and won WPBA Rookie of the Year in 2004.
