= Yifa =

- 依法
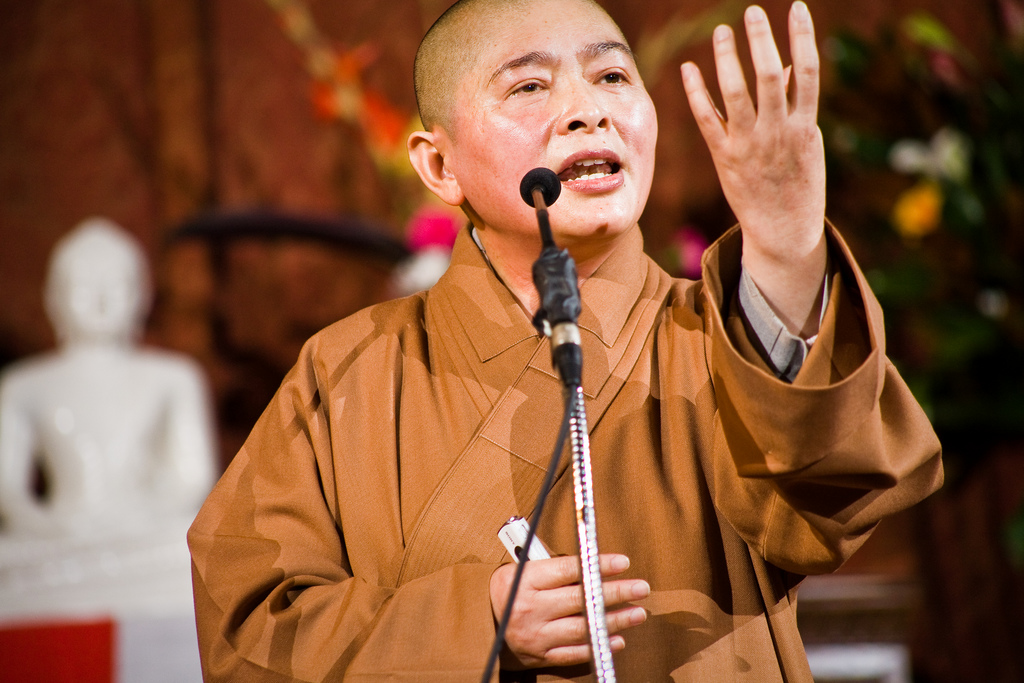
- Yifa in 2008
- Title: Venerable

Personal life
- Born: 1959 (age 66–67) Taiwan
- Education: National Taiwan University (LLB); University of Hawaiʻi (MA); Yale University (PhD)
- Website: www.woodenfish.org

Religious life
- Religion: Buddhism

Senior posting
- Teacher: Hsing Yun

Yifa (Chinese: 依法; born 1959) is a Taiwanese lawyer, theologian, and writer who is the founder of the Woodenfish Foundation. She is a nun ordained in 1979 by Fo Guang Shan, a Buddhist organization in Taiwan. She served as a department head and dean of University of the West during her tenure at the college.

== Education ==
Yifa attended law school at National Taiwan University, where she obtained an LL.B. degree, then completed graduate studies in the United States. She earned a master's degree in comparative philosophy from the University of Hawaiʻi and a Ph.D. in religious studies from Yale University. As a graduate student at Yale, she was mentored by Buddhist studies professor Stanley Weinstein and wrote her doctoral dissertation on the Vinaya and Indian and Chinese monastic codes.

== Career ==
Yifa has participated in many interfaith dialogues such as the Gethsemani Encounter and contributed to the UNICEF South Asia's Safe Motherhood Project. She is also the current director of the Woodenfish program for college students.

In 2003, Yifa was awarded an Outstanding Women in Buddhism Award. In October 2006, she was honored at the 9th Annual Juliet Hollister Awards Ceremony, which was held at the United Nations Headquarters. Yifa was recognized along with Wall Street Journal reporter Daniel Pearl, who was honored posthumously.

Venerable Yifa has also been involved in translating sutras from Mandarin to English. Since 2006, Yifa and others have published translations of the Heart Sutra, Diamond Sutra, Kṣitigarbha Bodhisattva Pūrvapraṇidhāna Sūtra and the Amitabha Sutra.

== List of books ==
- Authenticity: Clearing the Junk, A Buddhist Perspective
- The Tender Heart: A Buddhist Response to Suffering
- Discernment: Educating the Mind and Spirit
- Safeguarding the Heart: A Buddhist Response to Suffering and September 11
- The Origins of Buddhist Monastic Codes in China: An Annotated Translation and Study of the Chanyuan Qinggui

Yifa has also co-authored Benedict's Dharma: Buddhists Reflect On the Role of St. Benedict, along with Norman Fischer, Joseph Goldstein, Judith Simmer-Brown, David Steindl-Rast, and editor Patrick J. Henry.

== See also ==
- Fo Guang Shan
- Hsing Yun
- Woodenfish Foundation
