= Shenan Chuang =

Shenan Chuang (Chinese: 莊淑芬) is a Taiwanese businessperson. She is the chief executive officer for Ogilvy & Mather Greater China. In 2013, she was named one of Forbes Asia's "Women in the Mix".

== Career ==
Chuang first started working at public relations firms in Taiwan. In 1995, she started working for Ogilvy & Mather in Taiwan. She became CEO for Ogilvy & Mather Taipei in 2000. Forbes has credited Chuang for "helping revolutionize the mainland ad industry," in China. She is CEO of Ogilvy & Mather Greater China. She also owns an art gallery, O Gallery, which works with local artists in Beijing. Chuang has been interviewed based on her interest and desire to see women gain more power in the workplace.

In 2010 and 2011, Chuang was one of Fortune China's "Top 25 Business Women in China." She was named "Agency Head of the Year" by Campaign Asian Pacific in 2010. In 2013, she was named one of Forbes Asia's "Women in the Mix".

== Personal life ==
She was born in Taiwan.
