= Marco Zanetti =

Italian billiards player

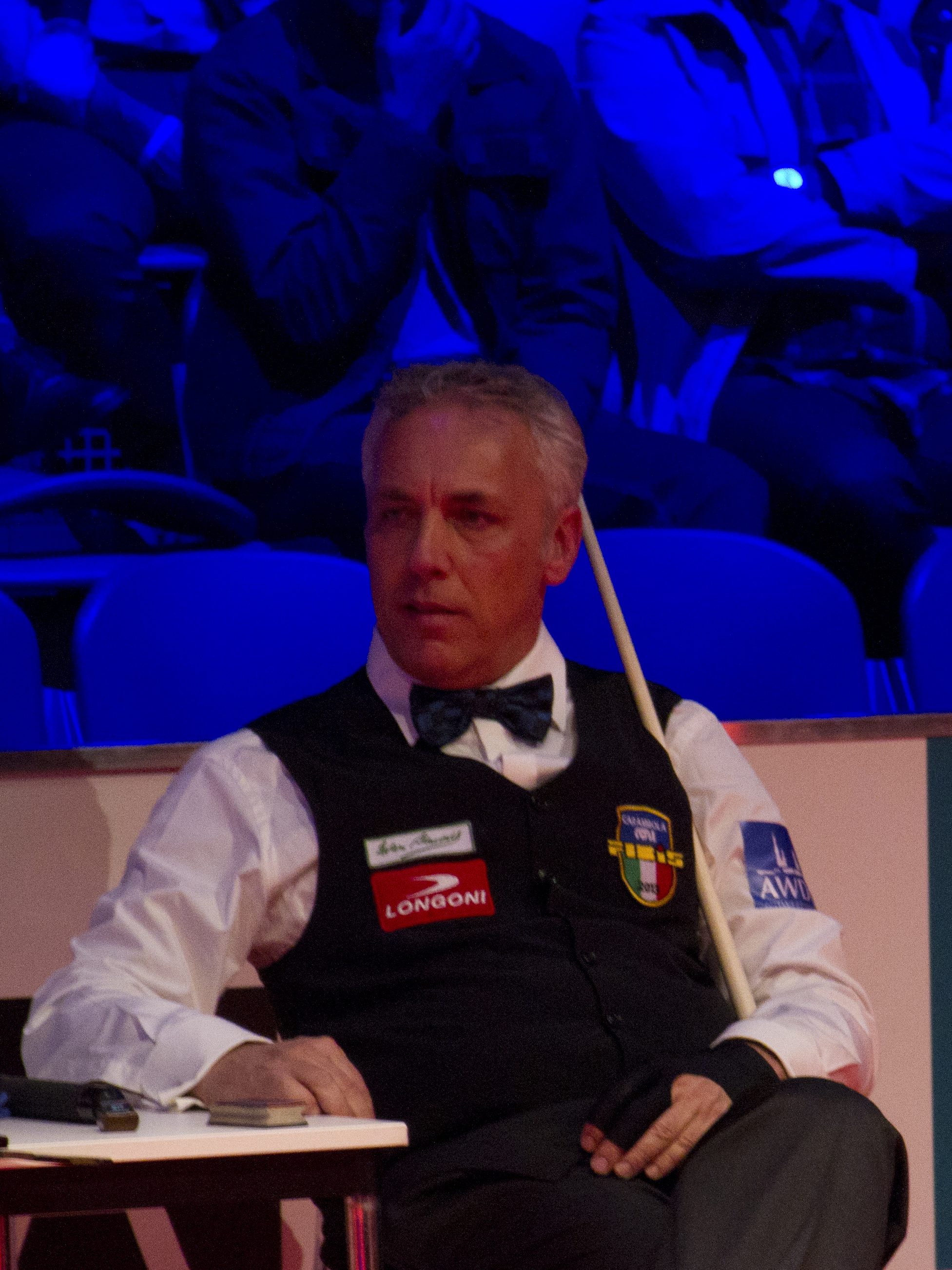
- Zanetti at the 2013 3-cushion World Championship in Antwerp

Medal record

Representing Italy

Men's Three-cushion billiards

Balkline European Championship
Gold medal – first place	1983 Balkline 47/2 European Championship	Individual
Gold medal – first place	1984 Balkline 47/1 European Championship	Individual

Men's Three-cushion billiards

Biathlon World Championship (3-Cushion and 5-Pins)
Gold medal – first place	1988	Individual
Gold medal – first place	1996	Individual

UMB World Three-cushion Championship
Bronze medal – third place	1997 Grubbenvorst	Individual
Bronze medal – third place	2000 Saint-Étienne	Individual
Silver medal – second place	2001 Luxembourg	Individual
Gold medal – first place	2002 Randers	Individual
Bronze medal – third place	2003 Valladolid	Individual
Gold medal – first place	2008 Sankt	Individual
Bronze medal – third place	2009 Lausanne	Individual
Silver medal – second place	2011 Lima	Individual
Bronze medal – third place	2012 Porto	Individual
Bronze medal – third place	2021 Sharm el-Sheikh	Individual

CEB European Three-cushion Championship
Bronze medal – third place	2007	Individual
Bronze medal – third place	2010	Individual
Gold medal – first place	2013	Individual
Gold medal – first place	2017	Individual
Gold medal – first place	2023	Individual

World Games
Bronze medal – third place	2009 Kaohsiung	Individual
Gold medal – first place	2013 Cali	Individual
Silver medal – second place	2017 Wrocław	Individual

Crystal Kelly Cup
Gold medal – first place	2010	Individual
Silver medal – second place	2011	Individual

Lausanne Billiard Masters
Gold medal – first place	2013	Individual

AGIPI Billiard Masters
Gold medal – first place	2013	Individual

Marco Zanetti (born 10 April 1962) is an Italian professional three-cushion billiards player and a two-time world champion from Bolzano, Italy.

== Privat ==
Zanetti started playing billiards at 7. He needed a chair to play. His father, Erwin Zanetti, was the president of the Carambole Circle of Bolzano.

He is regarded as a brilliant billiards player, but also a controversial person who does not hold back with criticism of the world or continental federation and organizers. This brought him in the past, often the wrath of the organizers, as well as its behavior in different tournaments. Because of his criticism of the UMB at the World Cup 2009 tournament in Korea, Zanetti was assessed a lifetime 50-point penalty in the world rankings. Two years later, at the end of the three-band World Cup, also in Suwon, South Korea, the UMB took this penalty back and the end of the year he received his 50 points back for the world ranking.

Zanetti lives with his wife Martina and son Samuel (born 2008) in his birth town in South Tyrol. As a South Tyrolian he also speaks fluently German. His nickname in the billiards scene is The Italian gentleman.

== Early years ==
In his early career he won the balkline European Championship twice, 1983 in 47/2-Balkline and 1984 in 47/1-Balkline. Later he switched to three-cushion where he won the Biathlon (three-cushin and 5-pins) World Championship in 1988 and 1996.

== First success in 3-cushion ==
He reached the finals of the UMB World Three-cushion Championship in 2001, but was bested by Raymond Ceulemans. He made it into the finals again a year later and won the title, defeating Dion Nelin of Denmark. He has been the only Italian to win a world championship in the sport as of 2007. He was ranked 7th in the world as of 2007 by the Confédération Européenne de Billard.

Zanetti also has 25 Italian national titles. He is 7-time winner, from 2004/05 to 2011/12, of the Coupe d’Europe, a tournament series for clubs which is held since the season of 1958/59. It is comparable to the Champions League in Football. He plays for the club of BC AGIPI Courbevoie in France. His teammates in the Season 2011/12 are Frédéric Caudron (Belgium), Jérémy Bury (France) and Jean-Christophe Roux (France).

On 19 October 2008, he again won the world three-cushion championship in the German city of St. Wendel. He defeated Jérémy Bury of France in the semi-finals and then went on to beat Torbjorn Blomdahl of Sweden in the finals, averaging 1.871 in the five-set match. Through this victory he reached his best ranking in his career, so far, with the 5th place.

In 2010 he won the best paid tournament at this time, the Crystal Kelly Cup in Nice, France. Again Torbjörn Blomdahl was his losing opponent. One year later he was the runner-up to Filippos Kasidokostas from Greece. The Crystal Kelly Cup was an invitation tournament which has been sponsored by the Dutch software developer Joop van Oosterom. It has been named after his daughter Crystal Kelly.

== Season 2012/13 ==
At the 2012 3-cushion World Championship in Porto, Portugal he came, together with Caudron in third place. One week later he placed second at the third 3-cushion World Cup of 2012 in the South Korean town of Suwon.

On 17 March 2013 he won the final of the first Lausanne Billiard Masters in Lausanne, Switzerland against Frédéric Caudron from Belgium. Zanetti was winning on the last ball with a fluke to 40-33. In the semi-final, against Torbjörn Blomdahl, he made the highest run of the tournament with 15 balls, which gave him an extra bonus of 400 €. Finally, he earned 6,700 € for his victory. Just one week later he was winning the AGIPI Billiard Masters in Schiltigheim. Again, Caudron was his opponent. On 14 April he won the CEB European Three-cushion Championship. In the final he beats German ex-1996-World-Champion Christian Rudolph with 40-10. In the semi-final, he won third time in row against Caudron, although the Belgian was equalizing world record in High-Run of 28 points. Zanetti also made the new European record in General-Average of 2,500.

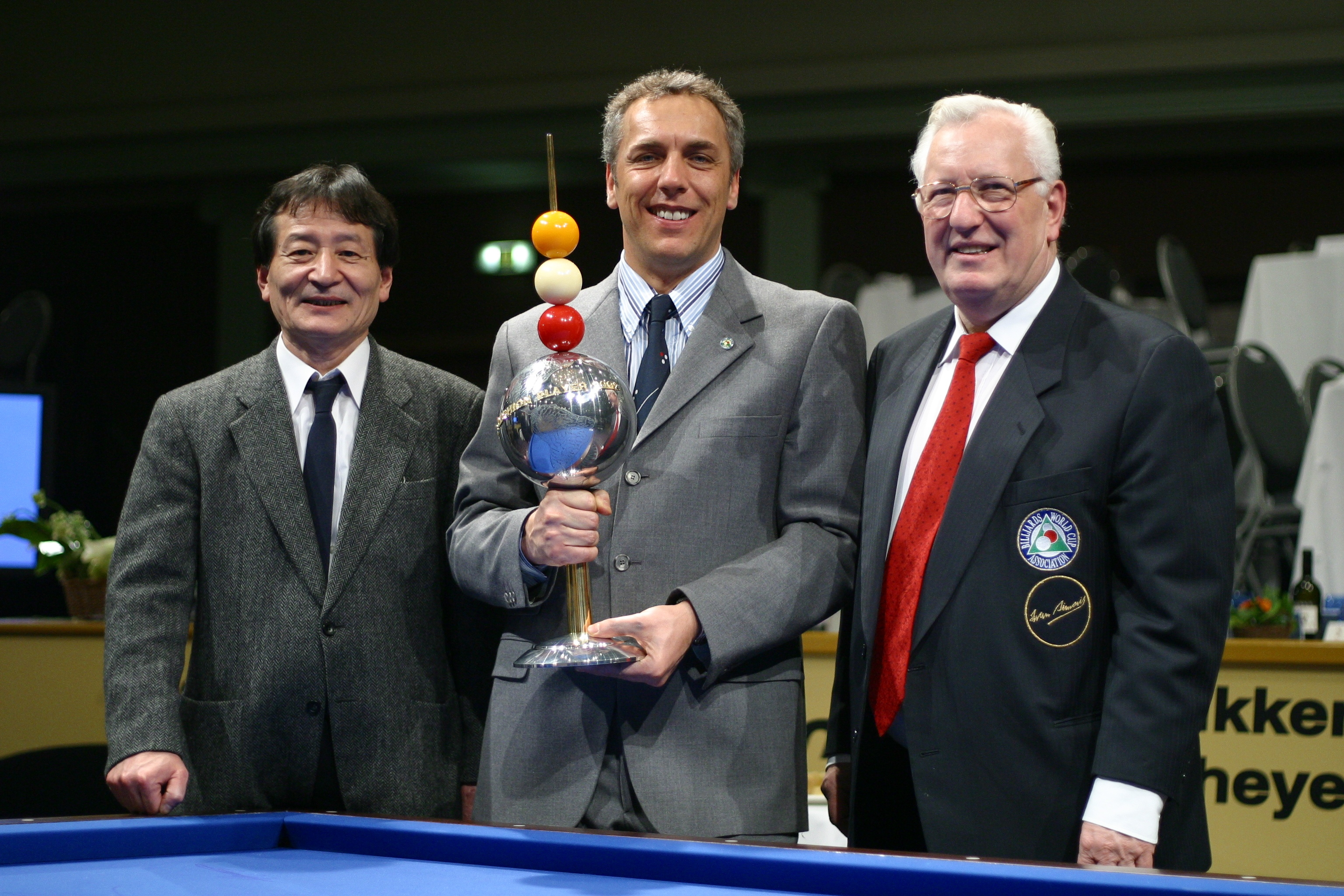
Winner as "Player of the Year 2003". Left: Nobuaki Kobayashi Right: Raymond Ceulemans

== Personal records ==
His highest run in a match is 21 and his best game average is 5.555 (50 points in 9 innings).

== Honours ==
In 2003 he won the title as "Player of the Year" in Antwerp.
