= Chen Chih-peng =

Taiwanese baseball player

- Left fielder
- Born: January 15, 1981 (age 45); Taiwan
- Bats: Right Throws: Right

CPBL debut
- March 18, 2006, for the Macoto Cobras

Career statistics (through 2009)
- Batting average: .222
- Home runs: 1
- Runs batted in: 27
- Stats at Baseball Reference

Teams
- Macoto Cobras (2006–2007); dmedia T-REX (2008); Brother Elephants (2009–2010)

Chen Chih-peng (Chinese: 陳致鵬; born 15 January 1981 in Taiwan) is a former Taiwanese baseball player who played for the Brother Elephants of the Chinese Professional Baseball League (CPBL) as an outfielder. He was with the Macoto Cobras and dmedia T-REX before playing for the Elephants. At the end of 2008, dmedia T-REX was disbanded and he was picked up by the Elephants in the fourth round of the redistribution draft. His older brother, Chen Chih-yuan (陳致遠), plays as a left fielder on the same team.

== Career statistics ==
Season	Team	G	AB	H	HR	RBI	SB	BB	SO	TB	DP	AVG
2006	Macoto Cobras	43	85	17	0	5	1	3	17	22	2	0.200
2007	Macoto Cobras	40	52	10	0	9	0	3	11	11	2	0.192
2008	dmedia T-REX	44	99	25	1	10	1	7	14	31	7	0.253
2009	Brother Elephants	3	12	3	0	3	0	0	3	5	0	0.250
Total	4 years	130	248	55	1	27	2	13	45	70	11	0.222

== See also ==
- Chinese Professional Baseball League
- Macoto Cobras
- dmedia T-REX
- Brother Elephants
