= Chiaho Shih =

- 施嘉和
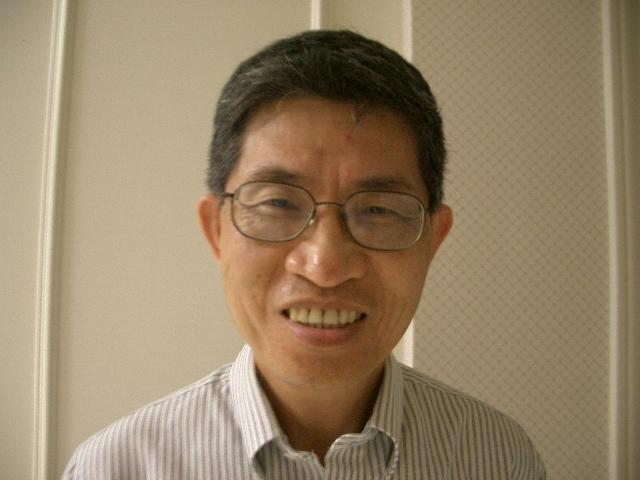
- Born: January 9, 1950 (age 76)
- Education: National Taiwan University (BS); Massachusetts Institute of Technology (PhD)
- Scientific career
- Fields: Virology
- Workplaces: Academia Sinica

Chiaho Shih (Chinese: 施嘉和; born 9 January 1950) is a Taiwanese virologist. He is a Distinguished Research Fellow in the Division of Infectious Disease & Immunology, Institute of Biomedical Sciences, Academia Sinica in Taiwan. His research is in the area of Molecular virology, Viral hepatitis and Hepatoma, and Cancer.

He is best known for his discovery of the first human oncogene Ras in 1982 while as a graduate student in the lab of Robert Weinberg at MIT, which is partially documented in Natalie Angier's book Natural Obsessions, about her year spent in Weinberg's lab. Also, the discovery is documented in Siddhartha Mukherjee's book The Emperor of All Maladies: A Biography of Cancer.

Shih was previously a professor at the University of Texas Medical Branch and the University of Pennsylvania. He graduated from National Taiwan University in 1973 and earned his Ph.D. from the Massachusetts Institute of Technology (MIT) in 1982, where he was a graduate student under Robert Weinberg. From 1982 to 1985, he was a postdoctoral researcher at Massachusetts General Hospital.
