= Three-cushion billiards at the 2001 World Games – men's singles =

Three-cushion billiards men's singles at the 2001 World Games
- Venue: Selion Plaza, Akita, Japan
- Dates: 22–26 August 2001
- Competitors: 16 from 13 nations

Medalists
gold medal	(Spain) Daniel Sánchez
silver medal	(Netherlands) Dick Jaspers
bronze medal	(United States) Sang Lee

The men's singles three-cushion billiards competition at the 2001 World Games took place from 22 to 26 August 2001 at the Selion Plaza in Akita, Japan.

== Last 16 ==
Dick Jaspers (Netherlands)	40–17	(Egypt) Zayed Mohamed
Sung Chul Jang (South Korea)	40–34	(Mexico) Luis Miguel Avila Banuelos
Jaime Bedoya (Colombia)	40–20	(Netherlands) Jean-Paul de Bruijn
Yung Kuo Yuan (Chinese Taipei)	28–40	(Belgium) Eddy Merckx
Tatsuo Arai (Japan)	26–40	(Peru) Ramon Rodriguez
Takamitsu Arakawa (Japan)	32–40	(Spain) Daniel Sánchez
Sang Lee (United States)	40–29	(Germany) Martin Horn
Jesus Lara Gonzalez (Mexico)	40–21	(Turkey) Semih Saygıner

== Last 8 ==
Quarter-finals
(Netherlands) Dick Jaspers	40
(South Korea) Sung Chul Jang	26
(Colombia) Jaime Bedoya	40
(Belgium) Eddy Merckx	23
(Peru) Ramon Rodriguez	39
(Spain) Daniel Sánchez	40
(United States) Sang Lee	40
(Mexico) Jesus Lara Gonzalez	30

Semi-finals
(Netherlands) Dick Jaspers	40
(Colombia) Jaime Bedoya	9
(Spain) Daniel Sánchez	40
(United States) Sang Lee	39

Gold medal match
(Netherlands) Dick Jaspers	30
(Spain) Daniel Sánchez	40
Bronze medal match
(Colombia) Jaime Bedoya	14
(United States) Sang Lee	40
