= Three-cushion billiards at the 2013 World Games – men's singles =

Three-cushion billiards men's singles at the 2013 World Games
- Venue: Unidad Deportiva Alberto Galindo, Cali, Colombia
- Dates: 26–30 July 2013
- Competitors: 16 from 13 nations

Medalists
gold medal	(Italy) Marco Zanetti
silver medal	(Belgium) Eddy Merckx
bronze medal	(Netherlands) Glenn Hofman

The men's singles three-cushion billiards competition at the 2013 World Games took place from 26 to 30 July 2013 at the Unidad Deportiva Alberto Galindo in Cali, Colombia.

== Last 16 ==
Marco Zanetti (Italy)	40–21	(Vietnam) Ma Minh Cam
Roland Forthomme (Belgium)	40–40^{[a]}	(Germany) Christian Rudolph
Murat Naci Coklu (Turkey)	40–33	(Venezuela) Merlin Romero
Kim Kyung-roul (South Korea)	40–26	(Colombia) Henry Diaz Parada
Dick Jaspers (Netherlands)	40–17	(Ecuador) Javier Teran
O Takeshima (Japan)	16–40	(Netherlands) Glenn Hofman
Sameh Sidhom (Egypt)	40–18	(Colombia) Carlos Campino
Eddy Merckx (Belgium)	40–4	(Nicaragua) Francisco Taylor

== Last 8 ==
Quarter-finals
(Italy) Marco Zanetti	40
(Germany) Christian Rudolph	21
(Turkey) Murat Naci Coklu	16
(South Korea) Kim Kyung-roul	40
(Netherlands) Dick Jaspers	34
(Netherlands) Glenn Hofman	40
(Egypt) Sameh Sidhom	27
(Belgium) Eddy Merckx	40

Semi-finals
(Italy) Marco Zanetti	40
(South Korea) Kim Kyung-roul	25
(Netherlands) Glenn Hofman	22
(Belgium) Eddy Merckx	40

Gold medal match
(Italy) Marco Zanetti	40
(Belgium) Eddy Merckx	20
Bronze medal match
(South Korea) Kim Kyung-roul	15
(Netherlands) Glenn Hofman	40

== Notes ==
- ^{a} Won match through two penalty-shootouts: 2–2, 1–2.
