= Three-cushion billiards at the 2017 World Games – men's singles =

Three-cushion billiards men's singles at the 2017 World Games
- Venue: Wroclaw Congress Center, Wrocław, Poland
- Dates: 26–30 July 2017
- Competitors: 16 from 13 nations

Medalists
gold medal	(Spain) Daniel Sánchez
silver medal	(Italy) Marco Zanetti
bronze medal	(Egypt) Sameh Sidhom

The men's singles three-cushion billiards competition at the 2017 World Games took place from 26 to 30 July 2017 at the Wroclaw Congress Center in Wrocław, Poland.

== Bracket ==
Round of 16
(Spain) Daniel Sánchez	40
(Poland) David Tonojan	9
(Spain) Javier Palazón	19
(United States) Hugo Patino	40
(Vietnam) Trần Quyết Chiến	40
(Colombia) Huberney Cataño	18
(Costa Rica) Erick Téllez	25
(Egypt) Sameh Sidhom	40
(Italy) Marco Zanetti	40
(Greece) Konstantinos Kokkoris	25
(United States) Pedro Piedrabuena	40
(Poland) Mateusz Śniegocki	27
(Belgium) Eddy Leppens	40
(Turkey) Can Çapak	28
(Japan) Ryuuji Umeda	32
(Netherlands) Dick Jaspers	40

Quarter-finals
(Spain) Daniel Sánchez	40
(United States) Hugo Patino	32
(Vietnam) Trần Quyết Chiến	36
(Egypt) Sameh Sidhom	40
(Italy) Marco Zanetti	40
(United States) Pedro Piedrabuena	23
(Belgium) Eddy Leppens	24
(Netherlands) Dick Jaspers	40

Semi-finals
(Spain) Daniel Sánchez	40
(Egypt) Sameh Sidhom	16
(Italy) Marco Zanetti	40
(Netherlands) Dick Jaspers	36

Final
(Spain) Daniel Sánchez	40
(Italy) Marco Zanetti	33
Third place
(Egypt) Sameh Sidhom	40
(Netherlands) Dick Jaspers	26
