= Nine-ball at the 2001 World Games – women's singles =

Nine-ball women's singles at the 2001 World Games
- Venue: Selion Plaza, Akita, Japan
- Dates: 22–26 August 2001
- Competitors: 16 from 11 nations

Medalists
gold medal	(United States) Jeanette Lee
silver medal	(United Kingdom) Karen Corr
bronze medal	(Chinese Taipei) Chen Chun-chen

The women's singles nine-ball competition at the 2001 World Games took place from 22 to 26 August 2001 at the Selion Plaza in Akita, Japan.

== Last 16 ==
Julie Kelly (Republic of Ireland)	9–3	(New Zealand) Lorraine Nancy Field
Anita Kuczma (Canada)	4–9	(Chinese Taipei) Liu Shinmei
Vivian Villarreal (United States)	4–9	(United Kingdom) Karen Corr
Yoko Miura (Japan)	7–9	(Germany) Karin Mayet
Jeanette Lee (United States)	9–5	(South Korea) Ga-young Kim
Tammy Cantoni (Australia)	3–9	(Japan) Akimi Kajitani
Franziska Stark (Germany)	9–3	(Japan) Makiko Takagi
Christina Nicklasson (Sweden)	4–9	(Chinese Taipei) Chen Chun-chen

== Last 8 ==
Quarter-finals
(Republic of Ireland) Julie Kelly	9
(Chinese Taipei) Liu Shinmei	8
(United Kingdom) Karen Corr	9
(Germany) Karin Mayet	3
(United States) Jeanette Lee	9
(Japan) Akimi Kajitani	8
(Germany) Franziska Stark	6
(Chinese Taipei) Chen Chun-chen	9

Semi-finals
(Republic of Ireland) Julie Kelly	3
(United Kingdom) Karen Corr	9
(United States) Jeanette Lee	9
(Chinese Taipei) Chen Chun-chen	6

Gold medal match
(United Kingdom) Karen Corr	3
(United States) Jeanette Lee	9
Bronze medal match
(Republic of Ireland) Julie Kelly	8
(Chinese Taipei) Chen Chun-chen	9
