= Jeng Jundian =

Taiwanese painter

- 鄭君殿
- Born: 1963 (age 62–63); Kinmen, Taiwan
- Education: Taipei National University of Arts
- Website: www.jengjundian.com

Jeng Jundian (Chinese: 鄭君殿; pinyin: Zhèng Jūndiàn; born 1963) is a Taiwanese contemporary artist, known predominantly for his large scale portraits and landscapes painted by layers of colorful lines; He is associated with color lines painting. He currently lives and works in Taiwan.

== Biography ==
Jeng Jundian was born on Kinmen island, experiencing there a tense military situation during most of his childhood. He moved to Taiwan at the age of 19 and graduated from Taiwan National University of Arts in 1987, a prominent member of the acclaimed First Promotion of that university. Among his teachers and mentors were art critic, director and photographer Chen Tsun-shing (陳傳興), painter and former director of the Kuandu Museum of Art Chu Teh-i (曲德義). First choosing abstraction, Jeng "attracted attention with his mature painting language, which was almost beyond his age", says art critic Yu Wei (游崴). Fresh out of university, Jeng exhibited in some of the biggest galleries in Taiwan including Lungmen Art Gallery, Fairmate gallery, Galerie Pierre, as well as art fairs around Asia. Jeng moved to Paris in 1996 and lived there for two years, a stay that corresponds with the gradual development of a new pictural language made of color lines, first using color crayons, and then evolving into a deeply personal painting style. After returning to Taiwan, Jeng continued holding many group or solo exhibitions, in Taiwan and in New York City. Beginning of 2014, after working for years from home in the heights of Yangmingshan National Park, Jeng joined the artist collective Polymer Studio (空場) as they moved into a decommissioned textile factory in Beitou, in the suburbs of Taipei. Jeng is married and has two sons.

== Style ==
Jeng is famously associated with color lines painting; simple and unadorned pure “colored lines” are used as his basic painting unit, forming linear layers, to depict tranquil realm that include images wavering between abstract and representational, with their textures rich and their colors light and peaceful.

A lingering image from afar, sparkling gem-like facets up close, Jeng creates a more solid surface than Impressionists, metamorphosing his subjects with a sense of light and tightly knit structures. As our eyes become familiar with the works, the images start to dissipate into the grids and hide in the abstract. Using a rigorous painting technique, Jeng investigates emotions and constructs his inner world through color lines, revealing forgotten scenes from our memories. It is there, where light acts as the beginning of the entire world.-- art critic YU Wei.

Jeng presents an essentially hybrid art, pairing the atmospheric mountainsides of Chinese art with the colors, the flattened space and an interest in technical innovations common to the Impressionists through the moderns. .-- Art critic N. F. Karlins.

== Exhibitions ==
Jeng's works have been exhibited internationally in solo or group shows. Jeng had a solo exhibition, “Another Day”, in November 2014 at Eslite Gallery, Taipei, and also took part in the 25th Anniversary Group Exhibition of that gallery that same year. Previously, he had held a larger exhibition entitled “Day In, Day Out”, also at Eslite Gallery, Taipei (2012); another solo exhibition at Eslite Gallery, Taipei(2008); a show Landscape – Cityscape, at Marlborough Gallery, New York (2005); Jeng had a duo exhibition with artist Wang Keping, Body & Nature: Two Chinese Artists, at Marlborough Gallery, New York (2004).; Taiwan Legend: Contemporary Painting in Taiwan, at Galerie Pierre, Taichung(1994).

Jeng's works are constantly shown at international art fairs such as Art Taipei, Art Beijing or Art Basel Hong Kong. In January 2019, Jeng Jundian held a solo exhibition on Eslite gallery's booth at the first edition of Taipei Dangdai. In 2021, Jeng held a solo exhibition at Tao Art Space in Taipei.

His works have been collected by Toledo Museum of Art (Ohio, USA), the White Rabbit Gallery (Sydney, Australia), Yuehu Museum of Art, Shanghai, China, Kuandu Museum of Fine Arts, Taipei, Taiwan.

== See also ==
- Line Art
- Cecily Brown
- Taiwanese art
