= UCI Indoor Cycling World Championships =

Cycling competition

The UCI Indoor Cycling World Championships are the set of world championship events for the disciplines of artistic cycling and a tournament of cycle ball. The World Championships are regulated by the Union Cycliste Internationale.

The UCI awards a gold medal and a rainbow jersey to the winner. Silver and bronze medals are awarded to the second and third place contestants. World champions wear their rainbow jersey until the following year's championship, but they may wear it only in the type of event in which they won it.

== Single Artistic cycling – Men ==
=== Medalists by year ===
Men's medalists
| Year | Location | Gold | Silver | Bronze |
|---|---|---|---|---|
| 1956 | Copenhagen; Denmark | Arnold Tschopp; Switzerland | Edi Grommes; West Germany | Adolf Pokorný; Czechoslovakia |
| 1957 | Liège; Belgium | Arnold Tschopp; Switzerland | Werner Vogt; East Germany | Holdi Thom; East Germany |
| 1958 | Karl-Marx-Stadt; East Germany | Heinz Pfeifer; West Germany | Arnold Tschopp; Switzerland | Hebert Wolfgang; East Germany |
| 1959 | Stuttgart; West Germany | Heinz Pfeifer; West Germany | Arnold Tschopp; Switzerland | Jan Krištůfek; Czechoslovakia |
| 1960 | Mulhouse; France | Arnold Tschopp; Switzerland | Heinz Pfeifer; West Germany | Heinz Stapf; West Germany |
| 1961 | St. Gallen; Switzerland | Arnold Tschopp; Switzerland | Gerhard Bräuer; East Germany | Hans Thissen; West Germany |
| 1962 | Vienna; Austria | Arnold Tschopp; Switzerland | Gerhard Blotny; East Germany | Jan Krištůfek; Czechoslovakia |
| 1963 | Basel; Switzerland | Arnold Tschopp; Switzerland | Hans Thissen; West Germany | Gerhard Bräuer; East Germany |
| 1964 | Copenhagen; Denmark | Hans Thissen; West Germany | Manfred Maute; West Germany | Jan Krištůfek; Czechoslovakia |
| 1965 | Prague; Czechoslovakia | Hans Thissen; West Germany | Gerhard Blotny; East Germany | Manfred Maute; West Germany |
| 1966 | Köln; West Germany | Willi Eichin; West Germany | Gerhard Bräuer; East Germany | Frantisek Kratochwil; Czechoslovakia |
| 1967 | Baden; Switzerland | Gerhard Blotny; East Germany | Manfred Maute; West Germany | Willi Eichin; West Germany |
| 1968 | Kassel; West Germany | Manfred Maute; West Germany | Willi Eichin; West Germany | Gerhard Blotny; East Germany |
| 1969 | Erfurt; East Germany | Gerhard Blotny; East Germany | Manfred Maute; West Germany | Willi Eichin; West Germany |
| 1970 | Ostrava; Czechoslovakia | Willi Eichin; West Germany | Manfred Maute; West Germany | Wilko Finke; East Germany |
| 1971 | Baden; Switzerland | Manfred Maute; West Germany | Gerhard Obert; West Germany | Jan Krištůfek; Czechoslovakia |
| 1972 | Offenburg; West Germany | Manfred Maute; West Germany | Gerhard Obert; West Germany | Peter Eberhard; Switzerland |
| 1973 | Vienna; Austria | Gerhard Obert; West Germany | Reiner Niedergesäss; West Germany | Peter Eberhard; Switzerland |
| 1974 | Heerlen; Netherlands | Gerhard Obert; West Germany | Kurt Hunsänger; West Germany | Peter Eberhard; Switzerland |
| 1975 | Ghent; Belgium | Gerhard Obert; West Germany | Kurt Hunsänger; West Germany | Patrik Schwartz; France |
| 1976 | Münster; West Germany | Kurt Hunsänger; West Germany | Gerhard Obert; West Germany | Patrik Schwartz; France |
| 1977 | Brno; Czechoslovakia | Kurt Hunsänger; West Germany | Patrik Schwartz; France | Gerhard Obert; West Germany |
| 1978 | Herning; Denmark | Kurt Hunsänger; West Germany | Franz Kratochwil; West Germany | Hansjörg Mohn; Switzerland |
| 1979 | Schiltigheim; France | Franz Kratochwil; West Germany | Patrik Schwartz; France | Gerhard Obert; West Germany |
| 1980 | Rheinfelden; Switzerland | Franz Kratochwil; West Germany | Jürgen Kessler; West Germany | Patrik Schwartz; France |
| 1981 | Heerlen; Netherlands | Franz Kratochwil; West Germany | Jürgen Kessler; West Germany | Markus Maggi; Switzerland |
| 1982 | Wiesbaden; West Germany | Franz Kratochwil; West Germany | Markus Maggi; Switzerland | Jürgen Kessler; West Germany |
| 1983 | Vienna; Austria | Peter Nieratschker; West Germany | Hermann Martens; Switzerland | Jürgen Kessler; West Germany |
| 1984 | Schiltigheim; France | Markus Maggi; Switzerland | Dietmar Ingelfinger; West Germany | Jürgen Kessler; West Germany |
| 1985 | St. Gallen; Switzerland | Markus Maggi; Switzerland | Jürgen Kessler; West Germany | Hermann Martens; Switzerland |
| 1986 | Genk; Belgium | Dieter Maute; West Germany | Dietmar Ingelfinger; West Germany | Roland Fleisch; Austria |
| 1987 | Herning; Denmark | Dieter Maute; West Germany | Dietmar Ingelfinger; West Germany | Hermann Martens; Switzerland |
| 1988 | Ludwigshafen; West Germany | Harry Bodmer; West Germany | Hermann Martens; Switzerland | Dieter Maute; West Germany |
| 1989 | Heerlen; Netherlands | Harry Bodmer; West Germany | Dieter Maute; West Germany | Hermann Martens; Switzerland |
| 1990 | Bregenz; Austria | Dietmar Ingelfinger; West Germany | Harry Bodmer; West Germany | Hermann Martens; Switzerland |
| 1991 | Brno; Czechoslovakia | Harry Bodmer; Germany | Dieter Maute; Germany | Hermann Martens; Switzerland |
| 1992 | Zürich; Switzerland | Harry Bodmer; Germany | Dieter Maute; Germany | Lionel Schwer; France |
| 1993 | Hong Kong | Dieter Maute; Germany | Jens Schmitt; Germany | Christian Wilhelm; Switzerland |
| 1994 | Saarbrücken; Germany | Dieter Maute; Germany | Jens Schmitt; Germany | José Arellano; Spain |
| 1995 | Épinal; France | Dieter Maute; Germany | Jens Schmitt; Germany | José Arellano; Spain |
| 1996 | Johor Bahru; Malaysia | Jens Schmitt; Germany | Joachim Wesner; Germany | José Arellano; Spain |
| 1997 | Winterthur; Switzerland | Martin Rominger; Germany | Jens Schmitt; Germany | Hannes Mähr; Austria |
| 1998 | Přerov; Czech Republic | Martin Rominger; Germany | Jens Schmitt; Germany | Hannes Mähr; Austria |
| 1999 | Madeira; Portugal | Martin Rominger; Germany | José Arellano; Spain | Hannes Mähr; Austria |
| 2000 | Böblingen; Germany | Martin Rominger; Germany | Matthias Letsch; Germany | Milan Krivanek; Czech Republic |
| 2001 | Kaseda; Japan | Martin Rominger; Germany | José Arellano; Spain | Matthias Letsch; Germany |
| 2002 | Dornbirn; Austria | Martin Rominger; Germany | Arnošt Pokorný; Czech Republic | Milan Křivánek; Czech Republic |
| 2003 | Schiltigheim; France | Martin Rominger; Germany | Robin Hartmann; Germany | Arnošt Pokorný; Czech Republic |
| 2004 | Tata; Hungary | Arnošt Pokorný; Czech Republic | Robin Hartmann; Germany | Steffen Hain; Germany |
| 2005 | Freiburg im Breisgau; Germany | David Schnabel; Germany | Robin Hartmann; Germany | Milan Křivánek; Czech Republic |
| 2006 | Chemnitz; Germany | David Schnabel; Germany | Florian Blab; Germany | Robin Hartmann; Germany |
| 2007 | Winterthur; Switzerland | Robin Hartmann; Germany | David Schnabel; Germany | Michael Brugger; Germany |
| 2008 | Dornbirn; Austria | David Schnabel; Germany; 191.64 | Florian Blab; Germany; 190.37 | Robin Hartmann; Germany; 188.19 |
| 2009 | Tavira; Portugal | David Schnabel; Germany; 194.39 | Florian Blab; Germany; 177.29 | Sum Yee Samuel Yu; Hong Kong; 148.90 |
| 2010 | Stuttgart; Germany | David Schnabel; Germany; 206.57 | Florian Blab; Germany; 200.16 | Hang Cheong Wong; Macau; 160.30 |
| 2011 | Kagoshima; Japan | David Schnabel; Germany; 208.91 WR | Florian Blab; Germany; 205.17 | Hang Cheong Wong; Macau; 165.31 |
| 2012 | Aschaffenburg; Germany | David Schnabel; Germany; 208.46 | Florian Blab; Germany; 198.98 | Yannick Martens; Switzerland; 164.27 |
| 2013 | Basel; Switzerland | David Schnabel; Germany; 208.25 | Michael Niedermeier; Germany; 193.67 | Wong Chin To; Hong Kong; 163.03 |
| 2014 | Brno; Czech Republic | Michael Niedermeier; Germany; 202.55 | Simon Puls; Germany; 187.51 | Wong Chin To; Hong Kong; 170.96 |
| 2015 | Johor; Malaysia | Michael Niedermeier; Germany | Simon Puls; Germany | Wong Chin To; Hong Kong |
| 2016 | Stuttgart; Germany | Lukas Kohl; Germany | Michael Niedermeier; Germany | Yannick Martens; Switzerland |
| 2017 | Dornbirn; Austria | Lukas Kohl; Germany | Moritz Herbst; Germany | Wong Chin To; Hong Kong |
| 2018 | Liège; Belgium | Lukas Kohl; Germany | Moritz Herbst; Germany | Wong Chin To; Hong Kong |
| 2019 | Basel; Switzerland | Lukas Kohl; Germany | Marcel Jüngling; Germany | Wong Chin To; Hong Kong |
| 2021 | Stuttgart; Germany | Lukas Kohl; Germany | Max Maute; Germany | Emilio Arellano; Spain |
| 2022 | Ghent; Belgium | Lukas Kohl; Germany | Marcel Jüngling; Germany | Emilio Arellano; Spain |
| 2023 | Glasgow; United Kingdom | Lukas Kohl; Germany | Philipp-Thies Rapp; Germany | Emilio Arellano; Spain |
| 2024 | Bremen; Germany | Emilio Arellano; Spain | Philipp-Thies Rapp; Germany | Lukas Kohl; Germany |
| 2025 | Göppingen; Germany | Philipp-Thies Rapp; Germany | Linus Weber; Germany | Csaba Varga; Hungary |
| 2026 | Ludwigsburg; Germany | Philipp-Thies Rapp; Germany | Simon Halter; Germany | Csaba Varga; Hungary |

=== Top medal winners (1956–2024) ===
| No. | Athlete | Country | Gold | Silver | Bronze |
|---|---|---|---|---|---|
| 1 | David Schnabel | Germany | 8 | 1 | 0 |
| 2 | Martin Rominger | Germany | 7 | 0 | 0 |
| 3 | Lukas Kohl | Germany | 7 | 0 | 1 |
| 4 | Arnold Tschopp | Switzerland | 6 | 2 | 0 |
| 5 | Dieter Maute | Germany | 5 | 3 | 1 |
| 6 | Franz Kratochwil | West Germany | 4 | 1 | 1 |
| 7 | Harry Bodmer | Germany | 4 | 1 | 0 |
| 8 | Manfred Maute | West Germany | 3 | 4 | 1 |
| 9 | Gerhard Obert | West Germany | 3 | 3 | 2 |
| 10 | Kurt Hunsänger | West Germany | 3 | 2 | 0 |

=== Medals by countries (1956–2026) ===
| Rank | Nation | Gold | Silver | Bronze | Total |
|---|---|---|---|---|---|
| 1 | Germany / West Germany | 58 | 55 | 17 | 130 |
| 2 | Switzerland | 8 | 5 | 13 | 26 |
| 3 | East Germany | 2 | 5 | 5 | 12 |
| 4 | Spain | 1 | 2 | 6 | 9 |
| 5 | Czech Republic / Czechoslovakia | 1 | 1 | 10 | 12 |
| 6 | France | 0 | 2 | 4 | 6 |
| 7 | Hong Kong | 0 | 0 | 7 | 7 |
| 8 | Austria | 0 | 0 | 4 | 4 |
| 9 | Hungary | 0 | 0 | 2 | 2 |
| 9 | Macau | 0 | 0 | 2 | 2 |
| Totals (10 entries) | | 70 | 70 | 70 | 210 |

== Single Artistic cycling – Women ==
=== Medalists by year ===
Women's Medalists
| Year | Location | Gold | Silver | Bronze |
|---|---|---|---|---|
| 1959 | Stuttgart; West Germany | Edith Beneke; West Germany | Käthi Wahl; West Germany | Ursula Beckers; West Germany |
| 1960 | Mülhausen; France | Anna Matoušková; Czechoslovakia | Edith Manthey; West Germany | Ursula Beckers; West Germany |
| 1961 | St. Gallen; Switzerland | Gisela Florack; West Germany | Edith Manthey; West Germany | Annerose Loesch; East Germany |
| 1962 | Wien; Austria | Gisela Florack; West Germany | Gerhild Bauer; West Germany | Annerose Loesch; East Germany |
| 1963 | Basel; Switzerland | Gerhild Bauer; West Germany | Edith Manthey; West Germany | Annerose Loesch; East Germany |
| 1964 | Copenhagen; Denmark | Gerhild Bauer; West Germany | Annemarie Fehr; Austria | Anna Matoušková; Czechoslovakia |
| 1965 | Prague; Czechoslovakia | Annemarie Fehr; Austria | Gerhild Bauer; West Germany | Anna Matoušková; Czechoslovakia |
| 1966 | Köln; West Germany | Gerhild Bauer; West Germany | Anna Matoušková; Czechoslovakia | Annemarie Fehr; Austria |
| 1967 | Baden; Switzerland | Anna Matoušková; Czechoslovakia | Hildegard Laigre; West Germany | Annemarie Flaig; West Germany |
| 1968 | Kassel; West Germany | Annemarie Flaig; West Germany | Anna Matoušková; Czechoslovakia | Hildegard Laigre; West Germany |
| 1969 | Erfurt; East Germany | Annemarie Flaig; West Germany | Anna Matoušková; Czechoslovakia | Elisabeth Binanzer; West Germany |
| 1970 | Ostrava; Czechoslovakia | Annemarie Flaig; West Germany | Anna Matoušková; Czechoslovakia | Hildegard Laigre; West Germany |
| 1971 | Baden; Switzerland | Ann. Flaig-Schlosser; West Germany | Anna Matoušková; Czechoslovakia | Hildegard Laigre; West Germany |
| 1972 | Offenburg; West Germany | Ann. Flaig-Schlosser; West Germany | Anna Matoušková; Czechoslovakia | Elisabeth Binanzer; West Germany |
| 1973 | Wien; Austria | Elisabeth Binanzer; West Germany | Anna Matoušková; Czechoslovakia | Edith Westhäuser; West Germany |
| 1974 | Heerlen; Netherlands | Anna Matoušková; Czechoslovakia | Elisabeth Binanzer; West Germany | Gabi Höhler; West Germany |
| 1975 | Gent; Belgium | Anna Matoušková; Czechoslovakia | Regina Jisra; West Germany | Gabi Höhler; West Germany |
| 1976 | Münster; West Germany | Anna Matoušková; Czechoslovakia | Edith Westhäuser; West Germany | Lea Horvathova; Czechoslovakia |
| 1977 | Brno; Czechoslovakia | Anna Matoušková; Czechoslovakia | Edith Westhäuser; West Germany | Gabi Höhler; West Germany |
| 1978 | Herning; Denmark | Gabi Höhler; West Germany | Anna Matoušková; Czechoslovakia | Gudrun Lorenz; West Germany |
| 1979 | Schiltigheim; France | Anna Matoušková; Czechoslovakia | Eliane Maggi; Switzerland | Silvia Steiner; Switzerland |
| 1980 | Rheinfelden; Switzerland | Eliane Maggi; Switzerland | Regina Jisra; West Germany | Lea Horváthová; Czechoslovakia |
| 1981 | Heerlen; Netherlands | Petra Bender; West Germany | Regina Jisra; West Germany | Eliane Maggi; Switzerland |
| 1982 | Wiesbaden; West Germany | Maria Beerlage; West Germany | Petra Bender; West Germany | Eliane Maggi; Switzerland |
| 1983 | Wien; Austria | Maria Beerlage; West Germany | Danuše Hájková; Czechoslovakia | Ursula Pfaff; France |
| 1984 | Schiltigheim; France | Gudrun Regele; West Germany | Maria Beerlage; West Germany | Danuše Hájková; Czechoslovakia |
| 1985 | St. Gallen; Switzerland | Eliane Maggi; Switzerland | Gudrun Regele; West Germany | Danuše Hájková; Czechoslovakia |
| 1986 | Genk; Belgium | Heike Marklein; West Germany | Danuše Hájková; Czechoslovakia | Jana Pospíšilová; Czechoslovakia |
| 1987 | Herning; Denmark | Marianne Martens; Switzerland | Heike Marklein; West Germany | Danuše Hrdličková; Czechoslovakia |
| 1988 | Ludwigshafen; West Germany | Marianne Martens; Switzerland | Heike Marklein; West Germany | Iris Kurz; West Germany |
| 1989 | Heerlen; Netherlands | Heike Marklein; West Germany | Iris Kurz; West Germany | Marianne Martens; Switzerland |
| 1990 | Bregenz; Austria | Claudia Dreher; West Germany | Marianne Martens; Switzerland | Iris Kurz; West Germany |
| 1991 | Brno; Czechoslovakia | Iris Kurz; Germany | Andrea Barth; Germany | Sabine Franz; Austria |
| 1992 | Zürich; Switzerland | Iris Kurz; Germany | Andrea Barth; Germany | Leona Soušková; Czechoslovakia |
| 1993 | Hong Kong | Iris Kurz; Germany | Andrea Barth; Germany | Leona Soušková; Czech Republic |
| 1994 | Saarbrücken; Germany | Andrea Barth; Germany | Iris Kurz; Germany | Martina Štěpánková; Czech Republic |
| 1995 | Epinal; France | Andrea Barth; Germany | Sonja Bissinger; Germany | Leona Soušková; Czech Republic |
| 1996 | Johor Bahru; Malaysia | Andrea Barth; Germany | Martina Štěpánková; Czech Republic | Daniela Keller; Switzerland |
| 1997 | Winterthur; Switzerland | Sandra Schlosser; Germany | Martina Štěpánková; Czech Republic | Sonja Bissinger; Germany |
| 1998 | Přerov; Czech Republic | Martina Štěpánková; Czech Republic | Sonja Bissinger; Germany | Astrid Ruckaberle; Germany |
| 1999 | Madeira; Portugal | Martina Štěpánková; Czech Republic | Sandra Schlosser; Germany | Astrid Ruckaberle; Germany |
| 2000 | Böblingen; Germany | Astrid Ruckaberle; Germany | Martina Štěpánková; Czech Republic | Sandra Schlosser; Germany |
| 2001 | Kaseda; Japan | Astrid Ruckaberle; Germany | Martina Štěpánková; Czech Republic | Nicole Krautwurst; Germany |
| 2002 | Dornbirn; Austria | Martina Štěpánková; Czech Republic | Astrid Ruckaberle; Germany | Silke Gaiser; Germany |
| 2003 | Schiltigheim; France | Astrid Ruckaberle; Germany | Corinna Hein; Germany | Martina Štepánková; Czech Republic |
| 2004 | Tata; Hungary | Claudia Wieland; Germany | Corinna Hein; Germany | Sarah Kohl; Austria |
| 2005 | Freiburg; Germany | Claudia Wieland; Germany | Sandra Beck; Germany | Denise Boller; Austria |
| 2006 | Chemnitz; Germany | Sarah Kohl; Austria | Claudia Wieland; Germany | Sandra Beck; Germany |
| 2007 | Winterthur; Switzerland | Anja Scheu; Germany | Sarah Kohl; Austria | Sandra Beck; Germany |
| 2008 | Dornbirn; Austria | Anja Scheu; Germany; 171.04 | Sandra Beck; Germany; 166.24 | Marion Kleinschwärzer; Germany; 166.08 |
| 2009 | Tavira; Portugal | Corinna Hein; Germany; 172.19 | Sandra Beck; Germany; 163.35 | Denise Boller; Austria; 154.51 |
| 2010 | Stuttgart; Germany | Denise Boller; Austria; 170.63 | Marion Kleinschwärzer; Germany; 165.64 | Corinna Hein; Germany; 157.82 |
| 2011 | Kagoshima; Japan | Corinna Hein; Germany; 171.75 | Sandra Beck; Germany; 169.71 | Nikola Lebánková; Czech Republic; 156.85 |
| 2012 | Aschaffenburg; Germany | Corinna Hein; Germany; 179.93 | Sandra Beck; Germany; 177.75 | Adriana Mathis; Austria; 165.19 |
| 2013 | Basel; Switzerland | Corinna Hein; Germany; 180.11 | Lisa Hattemer; Germany; 170.12 | Seraina Waibel; Switzerland; 153.98 |
| 2014 | Brno; Czech Republic | Corinna Biethan; Germany; 178.02 | Adriana Mathis; Austria; 170.93 | Nicole Frýbortová; Slovakia; 164.97 |
| 2015 | Johor; Malaysia | Adriana Mathis; Austria | Nicole Frýbortová; Slovakia | Lisa Hattemer; Germany |
| 2016 | Stuttgart; Germany | Lisa Hattemer; Germany | Viola Brand; Germany | Nicole Frýbortová; Slovakia |
| 2017 | Dornbirn; Austria | Milena Slupina; Germany | Viola Brand; Germany | Adriana Mathis; Austria |
| 2018 | Liège; Belgium | Iris Schwarzhaupt; Germany | Milena Slupina; Germany | Adriana Mathis; Austria |
| 2019 | Basel; Switzerland | Milena Slupina; Germany | Viola Brand; Germany | Lorena Schneider; Austria |
| 2021 | Stuttgart; Germany | Milena Slupina; Germany | Lara Füller; Germany | Alessa Hotz; Switzerland |
| 2022 | Ghent; Belgium | Jana Pfann; Germany | Ramona Dandl; Germany | Alessa Hotz; Switzerland |
| 2023 | Glasgow; United Kingdom | Ramona Dandl; Germany | Lara Füller; Germany | Lorena Schneider; Austria |
| 2024 | Bremen; Germany | Lara Füller; Germany | Jana Pfann; Germany | Lorena Schneider; Austria |
| 2025 | Göppingen; Germany | Jana Pfann; Germany | Alessa Hotz; Switzerland | Lorena Schneider; Austria |
| 2026 | Ludwigsburg; Germany | Lara Füller; Germany | Ramona Dandl; Germany | Alessa Hotz; Switzerland |

=== Top medal winners (1959–2014) ===
| No. | Athlete | Country | Gold | Silver | Bronze |
|---|---|---|---|---|---|
| 1 | Anna Matoušková | (Czech Republic) Czechoslovakia | 7 | 8 | 2 |
| 2 | Corinna Hein-Biethan | Germany | 5 | 2 | 1 |
| 3 | Annemarie Flaig-Schlosser | West Germany | 5 | 1 | 0 |
| 4 | Martina Štěpánková | Czech Republic | 3 | 4 | 2 |
| 5 | Iris Kurz | Germany | 3 | 3 | 0 |
| 6 | Andrea Barth | Germany | 3 | 2 | 2 |
| 7 | Gerhild Bauer | West Germany | 3 | 2 | 0 |
| 8 | Astrid Ruckaberle | Germany | 3 | 1 | 2 |

=== Medals by countries (1959–2026) ===
| Rank | Nation | Gold | Silver | Bronze | Total |
|---|---|---|---|---|---|
| 1 | Germany / West Germany | 49 | 46 | 26 | 121 |
| 2 | Czech Republic / Czechoslovakia | 10 | 14 | 14 | 38 |
| 3 | Austria | 4 | 3 | 12 | 19 |
| 4 | Switzerland | 4 | 3 | 9 | 16 |
| 5 | Slovakia | 0 | 1 | 2 | 3 |
| 6 | East Germany | 0 | 0 | 3 | 3 |
| 7 | France | 0 | 0 | 1 | 1 |
| Totals (7 entries) | | 67 | 67 | 67 | 201 |

== Pairs Artistic cycling – Women ==
=== Medalists by year ===
| Year | Gold | Silver | Bronze |
|---|---|---|---|
| 1986 | (Germany) Manuela Kramp / Stefanie Teuber | (Austria) Brigitte Franz / Sabine Franz | (Switzerland) Martens / Obrecht |
| 1987 | (Austria) Brigitte Franz / Sabine Franz | (Germany) Daniela Krauter / Sandra Kienle | (Germany) Simone Liebenow / Claudia Horner |
| 1988 | (Germany) Martina Heimpel / Hildegard Wahl | (Germany) Sigrid Kiefer / Ulrike Meyer | (Portugal) Ivone Carvalho / Carmen Carvalho |
| 1989 | (Germany) Doris te Vrugt / Sabine Ostendorf | (Czech Republic) Edita Jelinkova/Lenka Kosova | (Portugal) Ivone Carvalho / Carmen Carvalho |
| 1990 | (Germany) Angelika Ziegler / Sylvia Steegmüller | (Portugal) Ivone Carvalho / Carmen Carvalho | (Germany) Sigrid Hupfer / Ulrike Meyer |
| 1991 | (Portugal) Ivone Carvalho / Carmen Carvalho | (Austria) Astrid Schröck / Sandra Nussbaum | (Switzerland) Claudia Gut / Monika Keller |
| 1992 | (Germany) Wittig / Heller | (Germany) Angelika Ziegler/Sylvia Steegmüller | (Portugal) Ivone Carvalho / Carmen Carvalho |
| 1993 | (Portugal) Ivone Carvalho / Carmen Carvalho | (Germany) Ute Bihler / Renate Truppe | (Germany) Susanne Müller / Kerstin Rösner |
| 1994 | (Germany) Angelika Ziegler / Sylvia Steegmüller | (Germany) Ute Bihler / Renate Truppe | (Czech Republic) Blanka Pospisilova / Sarka Jelinkova |
| 1995 | (Germany) Angelika Ziegler / Sylvia Steegmüller | (Germany) Susanne Seifert / Kerstin Stark | (Portugal) Ivone Carvalho / Carmen Carvalho |
| 1996 | (Germany) Susanne Seifert / Kerstin Stark | (Czech Republic) Blanka Pospisilova / Sarka Jelinkova | (Austria) Heike Müller / Marika Müller |
| 1997 | (Germany) Jäger / Schelshorn | (Portugal) Ivone Carvalho / Carmen Carvalho | (Austria) Heike Müller / Marika Müller |
| 1998 | (Portugal) Ivone Carvalho / Carmen Carvalho | (Austria) Heike Müller / Marika Müller | (Czech Republic) Blanka Neuschlova / Sarka Janeckova |
| 1999 | (Austria) Sabrina Theiner / Sarah Kohl | (Germany) Eva Breitenbach / Yvonne Breitenbach | (Czech Republic) Blanka Neuschlova / Sarka Janeckova |
| 2000 | (Portugal) Ivone Carvalho / Carmen Carvalho | (Czech Republic) Blanka Neuschlova / Sarka Janeckova | (Germany) Sandra Steegmüller / Katrin Ludwig |
| 2001 | (Germany) Sandra Steegmüller / Katrin Ludwig | (Germany) Eva Breitenbach / Yvonne Breitenbach | (Switzerland) Eliane Zeller / Petra Storchenegger |
| 2002 | (Germany) Carolin Ingelfinger / Katja Knaack | (Germany) Manuela Schönberger / Silke Gaiser | (Switzerland) Seraina Stahel / Letizia Stahel |
| 2003 | (Germany) Carolin Ingelfinger / Katja Knaack | (Germany) Nadine Wöhler / Katharina Urban | (Czech Republic) Andrea Petrickova / Iva Valesova |
| 2004 | (Germany) Carolin Ingelfinger / Katja Knaack | (Germany) Katrin Schultheis / Sandra Sprinkmeier | (Czech Republic) Andrea Petrickova / Iva Valesova |
| 2005 | (Germany) Carolin Ingelfinger / Katja Knaack | (Germany) Katrin Schultheis / Sandra Sprinkmeier | (Switzerland) Eliane Zeller / Petra Storchenegger |
| 2006 | (Germany) Carolin Ingelfinger / Katja Knaack | (Germany) Katrin Schultheis / Sandra Sprinkmeier | (Switzerland) Barbara Morf / Franziska Geier |
| 2007 | (Germany) Katrin Schultheis / Sandra Sprinkmeier | (Germany) Jasmin Soika / Katharina Wurster | (Czech Republic) Andrea Petríckova / Iva Valesová |
| 2008 | (Germany) Katrin Schultheis / Sandra Sprinkmeier | (Germany) Jasmin Soika / Katharina Wurster | (Switzerland) Barbara Morf / Nina Bommeli |
| 2009 | (Germany) Katrin Schultheis / Sandra Sprinkmeier | (Germany) Julia Thürmer / Nadja Thürmer | (Switzerland) Barbara Morf / Nina Bommeli |
| 2010 | (Germany) Jasmin Soika / Katharina Wurster | (Germany) Katrin Schultheis / Sandra Sprinkmeier | (Switzerland) Barbara Morf / Nina Bommeli |
| 2011 | (Germany) Katrin Schultheis / Sandra Sprinkmeier | (Germany) Jasmin Soika / Katharina Wurster | (Czech Republic) Andrea Petríckova / Iva Valesová |
| 2012 | (Germany) Katrin Schultheis / Sandra Sprinkmeier | (Germany) Jasmin Soika / Katharina Wurster | (Austria) Darinka Puhr / Nadina Gasser |
| 2013 | (Germany) Jasmin Soika / Katharina Wurster | (Germany) Katrin Schultheis / Sandra Sprinkmeier | (Switzerland) Bettina Weber / Anja Weber |
| 2014 | (Germany) Katrin Schultheis / Sandra Sprinkmeier | (Germany) Jasmin Soika / Katharina Wurster | (Switzerland) Bettina Weber / Anja Weber |
| 2015 | (Germany) Julia Thürmer / Nadja Thürmer | (Germany) Lena Bringsken / Lisa Bringsken | (Switzerland) Fabienne Gamper / Rahel Nägele |
| 2016 | (Germany) Julia Thürmer / Nadja Thürmer | (Germany) Lena Bringsken / Lisa Bringsken | (Switzerland) Fabienne Gamper / Rahel Nägele |
| 2017 | (Germany) Julia Thürmer / Nadja Thürmer | (Germany) Lena Bringsken / Lisa Bringsken | (Switzerland) Fabienne Gamper / Rahel Nägele |
| 2018 | (Germany) Lena Bringsken / Lisa Bringsken | (Germany) Sophie-Marie Nattmann / Caroline Wurth | (Austria) Rosa Kopf / Svenja Bachmann |
| 2019 | (Germany) Lena Bringsken / Lisa Bringsken | (Germany) Sophie-Marie Nattmann / Caroline Wurth | (Austria) Rosa Kopf / Svenja Bachmann |
| 2021 | (Germany) Helen Vordermeier / Selina Marquardt | (Germany) Caroline Wurth / Sophie-Marie Wöhrle | (Austria) Rosa Kopf / Svenja Bachmann |
| 2022 | (Germany) Caroline Wurth / Sophie-Marie Wöhrle | (Germany) Helen Vordermeier / Selina Marquardt | (Austria) Rosa Kopf / Svenja Bachmann |
| 2023 | (Germany) Selina Marquardt / Helen Vordermeier | (Austria) Svenja Bachmann / Rosa Kopf | (Switzerland) Sina Bäggli / Julia Hämmerli |
| 2024 | (Germany) Henny Kirst / Antonia Bärk | (Germany) Kim Leah Schlüter / Neele Jodeleit | (Switzerland) Simona Lucca / Larissa Tanner |
| 2025 | (Germany) Henny Kirst / Antonia Bärk | (Germany) Kim Leah Schlüter / Neele Jodeleit | (Switzerland) Simona Lucca / Larissa Tanner |
| 2026 | (Germany) Kim Leah Schlüter / Neele Jodeleit | (Switzerland) Simona Lucca / Larissa Tanner | (Germany) Lillith Mester / Mira-Sofie Osterhage |

== Pairs Artistic cycling – Mixed ==
=== Medalists by year ===
Women's Medalists
| Year | Gold | Silver | Bronze |
|---|---|---|---|
Men's pairs
| 1986 | (West Germany) Markus Dreher & Armin Jurisch | (West Germany) Matthias Schlecht & Michael Böpple | (Austria) Gert Fleisch & Roland Fleisch |
| 1987 | (West Germany) Markus Dreher & Armin Jurisch | (West Germany) Matthias Schlecht & Michael Böpple | (Austria) Gert Fleisch & Roland Fleisch |
| 1988 | (West Germany) Markus Dreher & Armin Jurisch | (West Germany) Gebrüder Weil | (France) C. Cabourg & C. Jaros |
| 1989 | (West Germany) Gebrüder Weil | (West Germany) Matthias Schlecht & Michael Böpple | (France) C. Cabourg & C. Jaros |
| 1990 | (West Germany) Theo Benz & Armin Prinz | (France) C. Cabourg & C. Jaros | (West Germany) Matthias Schlecht & Michael Böpple |
| 1991 | (Germany) Matthias Schlecht & Michael Böpple | (Germany) T. Benz & A. Prinz | (France) C. Cabourg & C. Jaros |
| 1992 | (Germany) Stefan Raaf & Michael Roth | (Germany) Matthias Schlecht & Michael Böpple | (France) C. Cabourg & C. Jaros |
| 1993 | (Germany) Stefan Raaf & Michael Roth | (Germany) T. Benz & A. Prinz | (Austria) M. Bachmann & D. Entner |
| 1994 | (Germany) Stefan Raaf & Michael Roth | (Germany) Michael & Heiko Rauch | (Czech Republic) R. Zellweger & M. Schilt |
| 1995 | (Germany) Stefan Raaf & Michael Roth | (Germany) Michael & Heiko Rauch | (Czech Republic) D. Balasek & M. Digon |
| 1996 | (Germany) Michael & Heiko Rauch | (Germany) Stefan Raaf & Michael Roth | (Czech Republic) R. Zellweger & M. Schilt |
| 1997 | (Germany) Michael & Heiko Rauch | (Germany) Stefan Raaf & Michael Roth | (Czech Republic) R. Zellweger & M. Schilt |
| 1998 | (Germany) Stefan Raaf & Michael Roth | (France) F. Sonnemoser & P. Gilgenkrantz | (Czech Republic) D. Balasek & M. Digon |
| 1999 | (Germany) Michael & Heiko Rauch | (Germany) Stefan Raaf & Michael Roth | (France) F. Sonnemoser & P. Gilgenkrantz |
| 2000 | (Germany) Stefan Raaf & Michael Roth | (Germany) Michael & Heiko Rauch | (Czech Republic) D. Balasek & M. Digon |
| 2001 | (Germany) Simon Altvater & Nico Kunert | (Germany) Michael & Heiko Rauch | (Czech Republic) Petr & Kamil Bartunek |
| 2002 | (Germany) Simon Altvater & Nico Kunert | (Germany) Michael & Heiko Rauch | (Austria) Gebrüder Fritsch |
| 2003 | (Germany) Simon Altvater & Nico Kunert | (Germany) Michael & Heiko Rauch | (Czech Republic) Petr & Kamil Bartunek |
| 2004 | (Germany) Simon Altvater & Nico Kunert | (Germany) Michael & Heiko Rauch | (Czech Republic) Petr & Kamil Bartunek |
| 2005 | (Germany) Simon Altvater & Nico Kunert | (Germany) Felix & Jonas Niederberger | (Czech Republic) Petr & Kamil Bartunek |
| 2006 | (Germany) Simon Altvater & Nico Kunert | (Germany) Felix & Jonas Niederberger | (Czech Republic) Petr & Kamil Bartunek |
| 2007 | (Germany) Felix & Jonas Niederberger | (Germany) Viktor Volk & Manuel Huber | (Czech Republic) Beni Jost & Joel Schmid |
Open pairs
| 2008 | (Germany) Viktor Volk & Manuel Huber | (Germany) Stefan Rauch & Ann-Kathrin Egert | (Austria) Joachim & Fabian Allgäuer |
| 2009 | (Germany) Stefan Rauch & Ann-Kathrin Egert | (Germany) Felix & Florian Blümmel | (Czech Republic) Beni Jost & Joel Schmid |
| 2010 | (Germany) Stefan Rauch & Ann-Kathrin Egert | (Germany) Felix & Florian Blümmel | Hong Kong Hin Bon Ip & Pok Man Yu |
| 2011 | (Germany) Luisa & Benedikt Bassmann | (Germany) Oliver & Daniel Gronbach | Hong Kong Hin Bon Ip & Pok Man Yu |
| 2012 | (Germany) Luisa & Benedikt Bassmann | (Germany) Oliver & Daniel Gronbach | Hong Kong Hin Bon Ip & Pok Man Yu |
| 2013 | (Germany) André & Benedikt Bugner | (Germany) Luisa & Benedikt Bassmann | (Austria) Fabian Allgäuer & Adriana Mathis |
| 2014 | (Germany) André & Benedikt Bugner | (Austria) Fabian Allgäuer & Adriana Mathis | (Germany) Michael Rauch & Melissa Breitenbach |
| 2015 | (Germany) André & Benedikt Bugner | (Germany) Stefanie Dietrich & Robert -Schmidt | (Czech Republic) Lukas Burri & Fabienne Hammerschmidt |
| 2016 | (Germany) André & Benedikt Bugner | (Germany) Serafin Schefold & Max Hanselmann | (Austria) Marcel Schnetzer & Jana Latzer |
| 2017 | (Germany) Serafin Schefold & Max Hanselmann | (Germany) André & Benedikt Bugner | (Czech Republic) Lukas Burri & Fabienne Hammerschmidt |
| 2018 | (Germany) Serafin Schefold & Max Hanselmann | (Czech Republic) Lukas Burri & Fabienne Hammerschmidt | (Germany) Patrick Tisch & Nina Stapf |
| 2019 | (Germany) Serafin Schefold & Max Hanselmann | (Germany) André & Benedikt Bugner | (Czech Republic) Lukas Burri & Fabienne Hammerschmidt |
| 2021 | (Germany) Serafin Schefold & Max Hanselmann | (Germany) Lea-Victoria Styber & Nico Rödiger | (Austria) Katharina Kühne & Marcel Schnetzer |
| 2022 | (Germany) Serafin Schefold & Max Hanselmann | (Germany) Lea-Victoria Styber & Nico Rödiger | (Austria) Katharina Kühne & Marcel Schnetzer |
| 2023 | (Germany) Serafin Schefold & Max Hanselmann | (Germany) Lea-Victoria Styber & Nico Rödiger | (Hong Kong) Jeff Lim & Ron Lim |
| 2024 | (Germany) Lea-Victoria Styber & Nico Rödiger | (Germany) Niklas Kreuzmann & Celine Stapf | (Hong Kong) Jeff Lim & Ron Lim |
| 2025 | (Germany) Lea-Victoria Styber & Nico Rödiger | (Hong Kong) Jeff Lim & Ron Lim | (Germany) Niklas Kreuzmann & Celine Stapf |
| 2026 | (Germany) Lea-Victoria Styber & Nico Rödiger | (Germany) Patrick Tisch & Julia Hämmerli | (Austria) Marcel Schnetzer & Franziska Belmega |

== Quartets Artistic cycling – Women/Mixed ==
=== Medalists by year ===
| Year | Gold | Silver | Bronze |
|---|---|---|---|
UCI World Championships - Women's Quartets
| 2003 | Switzerland; Eliane Zeller; Petra Storchenegger; Jeanette Schneider; Sabrina Lenherr | Germany; Katja Gaißer; Simone Rudolf; Christine Zimmermann; Manuela Dieterle; RMSV Aach – Trainer Paul Gaißer | Austria; Kathrin Hagen; Melanie Melbinger; Silke Melbinger; Martina Schwar – RMV Hohenems |
| 2004 | Switzerland; Eliane Zeller; Petra Storchenegger; Jeanette Schneider; Sabrina Lenherr | Germany; Katja Gaißer; Simone Rudolf; Christine Zimmermann; Manuela Dieterle; RMSV Aach – Trainer Paul Gaißer | Czech Republic; Marketa Toboliková; Jana Oplocká; Katerina Pribylová; Michaela Matousková |
| 2005 | Czech Republic; Marketa Toboliková; Jana Oplocká; Katerina Pribylová; Michaela Matousková | Austria; Kathrin Hagen; Melanie Melbinger; Silke Melbinger; Martina Schwar – RMV Hohenems | Switzerland; Daniela Keller; Corinna Paul; Doris Roth; Angela Bollinger |
| 2006 | Germany; Wöhler; Carvalho; Carvallo-Becker; Pawletta – Liemer RC | Czech Republic; Pribylova; Tobolikova; Oplocka; Matouskova | Switzerland; Daniela Keller; Corinna Paul; Doris Roth; Angela Bollinger |
| 2007 | Germany; Manuela Dieterle; Katja Gaißer; Ines Rudolf; Simone Rudolf – RMSV Edelweiss Aach | Austria; Kathrin Hagen; Melanie Melbinger; Silke Melbinger; Martina Schwar – RMV Hohenems | Switzerland; Daniela Keller; Corinna Paul; Doris Roth; Angela Bollinger |
| 2008 | Austria; Kathrin Hagen; Melanie Melbinger; Silke Melbinger; Martina Schwar – RMV Hohenems | Germany; Manuela Dieterle; Katja Gaißer; Ines Rudolf; Simone Rudolf – RMSV Aach | Switzerland; Anja Gollmann; Andrea Keller; Maura Stiefel; Nora Willener – Kunstradfahrer Luzern |
| 2009 | Germany; Manuela Dieterle; Katja Gaißer; Ines Rudolf; Simone Rudolf – RMSV Aach | Austria; Kathrin Hagen; Melanie Melbinger; Silke Melbinger; Martina Schwar – RMV Hohenems | Switzerland; Anja Gollmann; Andrea Keller; Maura Stiefel; Nora Willener – Kunstradfahrer Luzern |
| 2010 | Germany; Katharina Gülich; Sonja Mauermeier; Ramona Strassner; Ruth-Maria Weiand – RSV Steinhöring | Austria; Martina Diem; Tanja Hutter; Joana Loureiro da Costa; Claudia Mathis – RV Hohenems | Switzerland; Anja Gollmann; Andrea Keller; Maura Stiefel; Nora Willener – Kunstradfahrer Luzern |
| 2011 | Germany; Katharina Gülich; Sonja Mauermeier; Ramona Strassner; Christina Posch – RSV Steinhöring | Switzerland; Carolin Noll; Andrea Keller; Maura Stiefel; Nora Willener – Kunstradfahrer Luzern | Slovakia; Korina Vas; Dora Szabo; Viktoria Csente; Alica Vinczeová – SKC Kolarovo |
| 2012 | Germany; Katharina Gülich; Sonja Mauermeier; Ramona Strassner; Christina Posch – RSV Steinhöring | Switzerland; Carolin Noll; Andrea Schilling; Maura Stiefel; Nora Willener – Kunstradfahrer Luzern | Austria; Nina Klammsteiner; Marion Müller; Elisa Klammsteiner; Anna Pircher |
| 2013 | Germany; Katharina Gülich; Sonja Mauermeyer; Anja Sporer; Christina Posch – RSV Steinhöring | Switzerland; Carolin Noll; Andrea Schillig; Maura Stiefel; Nora Willener – Kunstradfahrer Luzern | Austria; Nina Klammsteiner; Marion Müller; Elisa Klammsteiner; Anna Pircher |
| 2014 | Switzerland; Céline Burlet; Flavia Zuber; Melanie Schmid; Jennifer Schmid – RV Sirnach | Germany; Nelly Ludwig; Anja Fahrion; Sandra Möbus; Janina Raisch – RKV Denkendorf | Austria; Alice Stampach; Anna Pircher; Marion Müller; Julia Wetzel |
| 2015 | Germany; Katharina Gülich; Christine Posch; Michaela Schweiger; Ramona Ressel – RSV Steinhöring | Switzerland; Céline Burlet; Jennifer Schmid; Melanie Schmid; Flavia Zuber – RV Sirnach | Slovakia; Alica Vinczeová; Molnar Bagita; Viktoria Glofáková; Dora Szabo – SKC Kolarovo |
UCI-World Championships (Open Quartets)
| 2016 | Switzerland; Céline Burlet; Jennifer Schmid; Melanie Schmid; Flavia Zuber – RV Sirnach | Germany; Katharina Güllich; Ramona Strassner; Christine Posch; Ramona Ressel – RSV Steinhöring | Slovakia; Alica Vinczeová; Dora Szabo; Viktoria Glofáková; Henrietta Domin – SKC Kolarovo |
| 2017 | Switzerland; Céline Burlet; Jennifer Schmid; Melanie Schmid; Flavia Zuber – RV Sirnach | Germany; Katharina Güllich; Ramona Strassner; Michaela Schweiger; Ramona Ressel – RSV Steinhöring | Slovakia; Alica Vinczeová; Dora Szabo; Viktoria Glofáková; Henrietta Domin – SKC Kolarovo |
| 2018 | Germany; Katharina Güllich; Julia Dörner; Annamaria Milo; Ramona Ressel – RSV Steinhöring | Switzerland; Céline Burlet; Jennifer Schmid; Melanie Schmid; Flavia Zuber – RV Sirnach | Austria; Leonie Huber; Lea Schneider; Lukas Schneider; Julia Wetzel |
| 2019 | Switzerland; Elena Fischer; Vanessa Hotz; Saskia Grob; Stefanie Moos | Germany; Nora Erbenich; Sabrina Born; Annika Furch; Hannah Rohrwick | Austria; Leonie Huber; Lea Schneider; Lukas Schneider; Julia Wetzel |
| 2021 | Germany; Nora Erbenich; Sabrina Born; Annika Furch; Hannah Rohrwick | Austria; Leonie Huber; Lea Schneider; Lukas Schneider; Julia Wetzel | Switzerland; Ronja Zünd; Fabienne Haas; Laura Tarneller; Nadine Bissegger |
| 2022 | Germany; Annika Rosenbach; Milena Schwarz; Tijem Karatas; Stella Rosenbach | Switzerland; Stefanie Moos; Vanessa Hotz; Flavia Schürmann; Carole Ledergerber | Hong Kong; So Cheuk Lam; Wong Cheuk Sze; Ho Dong Qing; Lam Cheuk Yu |
| 2023 | Switzerland; Stefanie Moos; Vanessa Hotz; Flavia Schürmann; Carole Ledergerber | Germany; Annika Rosenbach; Milena Schwarz; Tijem Karatas; Stella Rosenbach | Austria; Lea Morscher; Annika Pichler Sze; Anna Pircher; Laura Schnetzer |
| 2024 | Switzerland; Stefanie Haas; Valerie Unternährer; Selina Niedermann; Sarah Manser | Germany; Milena Schwarz; Tijem Karatas; Stella Rosenbach; Svenja Kraus | Austria; Laura Schnetzer; Annika Pichler Sze; Anna Pircher; Lea Morscher |
| 2025 | Switzerland; Stefanie Haas; Sarah Manser; Selina Niedermann; Valerie Unternährer | Germany; Tijem Karatas; Annika Rosenbach; Stella Rosenbach; Milena Schwarz | Hong Kong; Ho Dong Qing; Lam Cheuk Yu; So Cheuk Lam; Wong Cheuk Sze |
| 2026 | Germany; Tijem Karatas; Milena Schwarz; Stella Rosenbach; Annika Rosenbach | Switzerland; Selina Niedermann; Geraldine Unternährer; Rhea Martinez; Valerie Unternährer | France; Alice Rieb; Valentine Rieb; Justine Martz; Thérèse Rietsch |

== Cycle-ball ==
=== Men ===
Medalists
| Year | Location | Gold | Silver | Bronze |
|---|---|---|---|---|
| 1930 | (Germany) Leipzig | Germany; Karl Berndt; Willi Scheibe | Germany; Georg Grebe; Otto Pantle | France; Charles Weichert; Phillipe Weichert |
| 1931 | (Switzerland) Bern | Germany; Wilhelm Schreiber; Eugen Blersch | Switzerland; Walter Osterwalder; Walter Gabler | France; Charles Weichert; Phillipe Weichert |
| 1932 | (France) Straßburg | Germany; Wilhelm Schreiber; Eugen Blersch | Switzerland; Walter Osterwalder; Walter Gabler | France; Ernest Heitz; René Heitz |
| 1933 | (France) Paris | Germany; Wilhelm Schreiber; Eugen Blersch | Switzerland; Walter Osterwalder; Walter Gabler | France; Charles Weichert; Phillipe Weichert |
| 1934 | (Germany) Leipzig | Germany; Wilhelm Schreiber; Eugen Blersch | Switzerland; Walter Osterwalder; Walter Gabler | France; Charles Weichert; Phillipe Weichert |
| 1935 | (Belgium) Antwerpen | Germany; Wilhelm Schreiber; Eugen Blersch | Switzerland; Walter Osterwalder; Walter Gabler | France; Charles Weichert; Phillipe Weichert |
| 1936 | (Switzerland) Zürich | Germany; Gustav Köping; Eugen Blersch | Switzerland; Walter Osterwalder; Walter Gabler | France; Charles Weichert; Phillipe Weichert |
| 1937 | (Austria) Wien | Germany; Wilhelm Schreiber; Eugen Blersch | Switzerland; Walter Osterwalder; Walter Gabler | France; Charles Weichert; Phillipe Weichert |
| 1938 | (France) Straßburg | Germany; Gustav Köping; Karl Schäfter | Switzerland; Walter Osterwalder; Walter Gabler | France; Auguste Ferrand; Alfred Doell |
Not held 1939-1945
| 1946 | (Switzerland) Zürich | Switzerland; Walter Osterwalder; Walter Gabler | France; Auguste Ferrand; Alfred Doell | Czechoslovakia; Jaroslav Novak; Jan Novak |
| 1947 | (France) Paris | Switzerland; Walter Osterwalder; Jakob Engler | Czechoslovakia; Frantisek Sedlacek; Bohumil Danes | (Belgium) Jozef Rogghe; Gaston Devos |
| 1948 | (Czechoslovakia) Prague | Czechoslovakia; Frantisek Sedlacek; Bohumil Danes | Switzerland; Walter Gebs; Ottavio Zollet | France; Marcel Amann; Georges Ertz |
| 1949 | (Denmark) Kopenhagen | Switzerland; Walter Gebs; Ottavio Zollet | France; Auguste Ferrand; Georges Ertz | Czechoslovakia; Frantisek Sedlacek; Bohumil Danes |
| 1950 | (Belgium) Lüttich | Switzerland; Walter Osterwalder; Rudi Breitenmoser | France; Marcel Amann; Georges Ertz | (Belgium) Gustaaf Tack; Alfons Bultynck |
| 1951 | (Italy) Mailand | Switzerland; Walter Osterwalder; Rudi Breitenmoser | West Germany; Willi Pensel; Rudi Pensel | France; Marcel Amann; Auguste Ferrand |
| 1952 | (Luxembourg) Bad Mondorf | Switzerland; Walter Osterwalder; Rudi Breitenmoser | West Germany; Willi Pensel; Rudi Pensel | France; Marcel Amann; Auguste Ferrand |
| 1953 | (Switzerland) Zürich | Switzerland; Walter Osterwalder; Rudi Breitenmoser | West Germany; Willi Pensel; Rudi Pensel | Czechoslovakia; Frantisek Sedlacek; Jaroslav Novak |
| 1954 | (Germany) Köln | Switzerland; Fritz Flachsmann; Rudi Breitenmoser | West Germany; Willi Pensel; Rudi Pensel | Czechoslovakia; Frantisek Sedlacek; Jaroslav Novak |
| 1955 | (Italy) Mailand | West Germany; Willi Pensel; Rudi Pensel | Czechoslovakia; Frantisek Sedlacek; Jaroslav Novak | Switzerland; Fritz Flachsmann; Ottavio Zollet |
| 1956 | (Denmark) Kopenhagen | Switzerland; Walter Osterwalder; Rudi Breitenmoser | West Germany; Willi Pensel; Rudi Pensel | Czechoslovakia; Frantisek Sedlacek; Jaroslav Novak |
| 1957 | (Belgium) Lüttich | West Germany; Willi Pensel; Rudi Pensel | Switzerland; Walter Gebs; Ottavio Zollet | East Germany; Gerd Martin; Gerhard Degenkolb |
| 1958 | (East Germany) Karl-Marx-Stadt | East Germany; Gerd Martin; Gerhard Degenkolb | Switzerland; Georges Lienhard; Rudi Breitenmoser | France; Jean Wolff; René Boeglin |
| 1959 | (Germany) Stuttgart | West Germany; Karl Buchholz; Oskar Buchholz | East Germany; Heinz Schneider; Gerhard Landmann | Czechoslovakia; Zdenek Birma; Lubomir Spachmann |
| 1960 | (France) Mülhausen | Switzerland; Adolf Oberhänsli; Erwin Oberhänsli | France; Jean Wolff; René Boeglin | West Germany; Theo Drzewicki; Erhard Stübner |
| 1961 | (Switzerland) St. Gallen | West Germany; Karl Buchholz; Oskar Buchholz | East Germany; Gerd Martin; Gerhard Degenkolb | Czechoslovakia; Jindrich Pospisil; Jaroslav Svoboda |
| 1962 | (Austria) Wien | West Germany; Karl Buchholz; Oskar Buchholz | Czechoslovakia; Jindrich Pospisil; Jaroslav Svoboda | Switzerland; Georges Lienhard; Rudi Breitenmoser |
| 1963 | (Switzerland) Basel | West Germany; Karl Buchholz; Oskar Buchholz | Switzerland; Adolf Oberhänsli; Erwin Oberhänsli | East Germany; Dieter Stolze; Hans Stolze |
| 1964 | (Denmark) Kopenhagen | West Germany; Karl Buchholz; Oskar Buchholz | Czechoslovakia; Jan Pospisil; Jindrich Pospisil | France; Jean Wolff; René Boeglin |
| 1965 | (Czechoslovakia) Prag | Czechoslovakia; Jan Pospisil; Jindrich Pospisil | East Germany; Gerd Martin; Erich Dusin | West Germany; Werner Wenzel; Günter Bittendorf |
| 1966 | (Germany) Köln | East Germany; Gerd Martin; Erich Dusin | West Germany; Werner Wenzel; Günter Bittendorf | Czechoslovakia; Jan Pospisil; Jindrich Pospisil |
| 1967 | (Switzerland) Baden | West Germany; Werner Wenzel; Günter Bittendorf | Czechoslovakia; Jan Pospisil; Jindrich Pospisil | East Germany; Erich Emde; Erich Dusin |
| 1968 | (Germany) Kassel | Czechoslovakia; Jan Pospisil; Jindrich Pospisil | East Germany; Dieter Stolze; Hans Stolze | West Germany; Werner Wenzel; Günter Bittendorf |
| 1969 | (East Germany) Erfurt | Czechoslovakia; Jan Pospisil; Jindrich Pospisil | West Germany; Wolfgang Flackus; Klaus Bernais | East Germany; Erich Emde; Erich Dusin |
| 1970 | (Czechoslovakia) Ostrava | Czechoslovakia; Jan Pospisil; Jindrich Pospisil | West Germany; Wolfgang Flackus; Klaus Bernais | Switzerland; Paul Oberhänsli; Georg Meile |
| 1971 | (Switzerland) Baden | Czechoslovakia; Jan Pospisil; Jindrich Pospisil | West Germany; Wolfgang Flackus; Klaus Bernais | Switzerland; Peter Tschopp; Bruno Moser |
| 1972 | (Germany) Offenburg | Czechoslovakia; Jan Pospisil; Jindrich Pospisil | West Germany; Wolfgang Flackus; Klaus Bernais | Switzerland; Jörg Osterwalder; Hanspeter Maurer |
| 1973 | (Austria) Wien | Czechoslovakia; Jan Pospisil; Jindrich Pospisil | West Germany; Wolfgang Flackus; Klaus Bernais | Switzerland; Peter Tschopp; Remo Stübi |
| 1974 | (Netherlands) Heerlen | Czechoslovakia; Jan Pospisil; Jindrich Pospisil | West Germany; Wolfgang Flackus; Klaus Bernais | Switzerland; Paul Oberhänsli; Georg Meile |
| 1975 | (Belgium) Gent | Czechoslovakia; Jan Pospisil; Jindrich Pospisil | West Germany; Wolfgang Flackus; Klaus Bernais | Switzerland; Paul Oberhänsli; Georg Meile |
| 1976 | (Germany) Münster | Czechoslovakia; Jan Pospisil; Jindrich Pospisil | West Germany; Wolfgang Flackus; Klaus Bernais | Switzerland; Paul Oberhänsli; Georg Meile |
| 1977 | (Czechoslovakia) Brünn | Czechoslovakia; Jan Pospisil; Jindrich Pospisil | West Germany; Hartmut Retlaff; Rainer Will | Switzerland; Beat Weber; Bruno Moser |
| 1978 | (Denmark) Herning | Czechoslovakia; Jan Pospisil; Jindrich Pospisil | Switzerland; Paul Oberhänsli; Georg Meile | West Germany; Erwin Schmitt; Klaus Schneider |
| 1979 | (France) Schiltigheim | Czechoslovakia; Jan Pospisil; Jindrich Pospisil | Switzerland; Paul Oberhänsli; Jörg Osterwalder | (Belgium) Eric Tack; Daniel van der Velde |
| 1980 | (Switzerland) Möhlin | Czechoslovakia; Jan Pospisil; Jindrich Pospisil | Switzerland; Paul Oberhänsli; Jörg Osterwalder | West Germany; Hartmut Retzlaff; Thomas Steinmeier |
| 1981 | (Netherlands) Heerlen | Czechoslovakia; Jan Pospisil; Jindrich Pospisil | Switzerland; Paul Oberhänsli; Jörg Osterwalder | West Germany; Erwin Schmitt; Klaus Schneider |
| 1982 | (Germany) Wiesbaden | West Germany; Andreas Steinmeier; Thomas Steinmeier | Czechoslovakia; Jan Pospisil; Jindrich Pospisil | Switzerland; Markus Foi; Luigi Foi |
| 1983 | (Austria) Wien | West Germany; Andreas Steinmeier; Thomas Steinmeier | Czechoslovakia; Jan Pospisil; Jindrich Pospisil | Switzerland; Peter Kern; Martin Zinser |
| 1984 | (France) Schiltigheim | Czechoslovakia; Jan Pospisil; Jindrich Pospisil | Switzerland; Paul Oberhänsli; Jörg Osterwalder | West Germany; Andreas Steinmeier; Thomas Steinmeier |
| 1985 | (Switzerland) St. Gallen | Czechoslovakia; Jan Pospisil; Jindrich Pospisil | West Germany; Andreas Steinmeier; Thomas Steinmeier | Switzerland; Paul Oberhänsli; Jörg Osterwalder |
| 1986 | (Belgium) Genk | Czechoslovakia; Jan Pospisil; Jindrich Pospisil | West Germany; Jürgen King; Werner King | Switzerland; Peter Kern; Martin Zinser |
| 1987 | (Denmark) Herning | Czechoslovakia; Jan Pospisil; Jindrich Pospisil | West Germany; Jürgen King; Werner King | Austria; Andreas Bösch; Manfred Schneider |
| 1988 | (Germany) Ludwigshafen am Rhein | Czechoslovakia; Jan Pospisil; Jindrich Pospisil | West Germany; Frank Müller; Manfred Geiler | Austria; Andreas Bösch; Gernot Fontain |
| 1989 | (Netherlands) Heerlen | Czechoslovakia; Miroslav Berger; Miroslav Kratochvil | West Germany; Jürgen King; Werner King | Austria; Andreas Bösch; Manfred Schneider |
| 1990 | (Austria) Bregenz | Germany; Andreas Steinmeier; Thomas Steinmeier | Czechoslovakia; Miroslav Berger; Miroslav Kratochvil | Switzerland; Alfred Metzger; Urs Suter |
| 1991 | (Czech Republic) Brünn | Germany; Jürgen King; Werner King | Switzerland; Peter Kern; Marcel Bosshart | (Belgium) Luc Mottet; Rudy Covent |
| 1992 | (Switzerland) Zürich | Germany; Jürgen King; Werner King | Switzerland; Peter Kern; Marcel Bosshart | Czechoslovakia; Miroslav Berger; Miroslav Kratochvil |
| 1993 | (Hong Kong) Hongkong | Switzerland; Peter Kern; Marcel Bosshart | Austria; Marco Schallert; Reinhard Schneider | Germany; Jürgen King; Werner King |
| 1994 | (Germany) Saarbrücken | Germany; Jürgen King; Werner King | Czech Republic; Miroslav Berger; Miroslav Kratochvil | Switzerland; Peter Kern; Marcel Bosshart |
| 1995 | (France) Epinal | Switzerland; Peter Kern; Marcel Bosshart | Czech Republic; Miroslav Berger; Miroslav Kratochvil | (Belgium) Luc Mottet; Rudy Covent |
| 1996 | (Malaysia) Johor Bahru | Switzerland; Peter Kern; Marcel Bosshart | Germany; Michael Lomuscio; Sandro Lomuscio | Austria; Rudolf Böhm; Herbert Pischl |
| 1997 | (Switzerland) Winterthur | Switzerland; Peter Kern; Marcel Bosshart | Czech Republic; Pavel Smid; Oldrich Groch | Austria; Andreas Bösch; Gernot Fontain |
| 1998 | (Czech Republic) Prerov | Germany; Jörg Latzel; Karsten Hormann | Czech Republic; Miroslav Berger; Miroslav Kratochvil | Austria; Marco Schallert; Dietmar Schneider |
| 1999 | (Portugal) Madeira | Switzerland; Christoph Hauri; Peter Jiricek | Austria; Marco Schallert; Dietmar Schneider | Czech Republic; Pavel Smid; Petr Skotak |
| 2000 | (Germany) Böblingen | Germany; Michael Lomuscio; Sandro Lomuscio | Switzerland; Hanspeter Flachsmann; Peter Jiricek | Austria; Marco Schallert; Dietmar Schneider |
| 2001 | (Japan) Kaseda | Germany; Michael Lomuscio; Sandro Lomuscio | Austria; Marco Schallert; Dietmar Schneider | Czech Republic; Pavel Smid; Petr Skotak |
| 2002 | (Austria) Dornbirn | Switzerland; Paul Looser; Peter Jiricek | Austria; Marco Schallert; Reinhard Schneider | Czech Republic; Pavel Smid; Petr Skotak |
| 2003 | (France) Schiltigheim | Czech Republic; Miroslav Berger; Jiří Hrdlička | Switzerland; Paul Looser; Peter Jiricek | Austria; Andreas Lubetz; Reinhard Schneider |
| 2004 | (Hungary) Tata | Czech Republic; Pavel Smid; Petr Skotak | Switzerland; Paul Looser; Peter Jiricek | Austria; Simon König; Dietmar Schneider |
| 2005 | (Germany) Freiburg | Germany; Mike Pfaffenberger; Steve Pfaffenberger | Czech Republic; Miroslav Berger; Jiří Hrdlička | Austria; Simon König; Dietmar Schneider |
| 2006 | (Germany) Chemnitz | Germany; Christian Hess; Thomas Abel | Czech Republic; Jiri Böhm; Jiří Hrdlička | Austria; Simon König; Dietmar Schneider |
| 2007 | (Switzerland) Winterthur | Germany; Christian Hess; Thomas Abel | Austria; Martin Lingg; Markus Bröll | Switzerland; Timo Reichen; Peter Jiricek |
| 2008 | (Austria) Dornbirn | Czech Republic; Radim Hason; Jiří Hrdlička | Germany; Christian Hess; Thomas Abel | Austria; Simon König; Dietmar Schneider |
| 2009 | (Portugal) Tavira | Switzerland; Marcel Waldispühl; Peter Jiricek | Germany; Uwe Berner; Matthias König | Austria; Simon König; Dietmar Schneider |
| 2010 | (Germany) Stuttgart | Germany; Uwe Berner; Matthias König | Switzerland; Marcel Waldispühl; Peter Jiricek | Austria; Patrick Schnetzer; Dietmar Schneider |
| 2011 | (Japan) Kagoshima | Austria; Patrick Schnetzer; Dietmar Schneider | Switzerland; Roman Schneider; Dominik Planzer | Germany; Roman Müller; Marco Rossmann |
| 2012 | (Germany) Aschaffenburg | Switzerland; Roman Schneider; Dominik Planzer | Austria; Patrick Schnetzer; Dietmar Schneider | Germany; Jens Krichbaum; Marco Rossmann |
| 2013 | (Switzerland) Basel | Austria; Patrick Schnetzer; Markus Bröll | Germany; Jens Krichbaum; Marco Rossmann | Switzerland; Roman Schneider; Dominik Planzer |
| 2014 | (Czech Republic) Brünn | Austria; Patrick Schnetzer; Markus Bröll | Switzerland; Roman Schneider; Dominik Planzer | Czech Republic; Pavel Smid; Petr Skotak |
| 2015 | (Malaysia) Johor Bahru | Austria; Patrick Schnetzer; Markus Bröll | Switzerland; Roman Schneider; Dominik Planzer | (France) Benjamin Meyer; Quentin Seyfried |
| 2016 | (Germany) Stuttgart | Austria; Patrick Schnetzer; Markus Bröll | Switzerland; Roman Schneider; Dominik Planzer | Germany; Gerhard Mlady; Bernd Mlady |
| 2017 | (Austria) Dornbirn | Germany; Gerhard Mlady; Bernd Mlady | Austria; Patrick Schnetzer; Markus Bröll | Switzerland; Roman Schneider; Dominik Planzer |
| 2018 | (Belgium) Lüttich | Austria; Patrick Schnetzer; Markus Bröll | Germany; Gerhard Mlady; Bernd Mlady | Switzerland; Roman Schneider; Paul Looser |
| 2019 | (Switzerland) Basel | Austria; Patrick Schnetzer; Markus Bröll | Germany; Gerhard Mlady; Bernd Mlady | Czech Republic; Jiří Hrdlička; Pavel Loskot |
| 2021 | (Germany) Stuttgart | Germany; Gerhard Mlady; Bernd Mlady | Switzerland; Benjamin Waibel; Severin Waibel | Austria; Patrick Schnetzer; Stefan Feurstein |
| 2022 | (Belgium) Gent | Austria; Patrick Schnetzer; Stefan Feurstein | Germany; Gerhard Mlady; Bernd Mlady | Switzerland; Benjamin Waibel; Severin Waibel |
| 2023 | (Scotland) Glasgow | Germany; Andre Kopp; Raphael Kopp | Switzerland; Timon Frohlich; Yannick Frohlich | Austria; Patrick Schnetzer; Stefan Feurstein |
| 2024 | (Germany) Bremen | Germany; Raphael Kopp; Bernd Mlady | Austria; Patrick Schnetzer; Stefan Feurstein | Switzerland; Severin Waibel; Jon Müller |
| 2025 | (Germany) Göppingen | Germany; Raphael Kopp; Bernd Mlady | Austria; Stefan Feurstein; Patrick Schnetzer | Switzerland; Timon Fröhlich; Yannick Fröhlich |
| 2026 | (Germany) Ludwigsburg | Austria; Markus Bröll; Patrick Schnetzer | Germany; Robert Mlady; Michael Birkner | Switzerland; Timon Fröhlich; Yannick Fröhlich |

=== Women ===
Medalists
| Year | Location | Gold | Silver | Bronze |
|---|---|---|---|---|
| 2023 | (Scotland) Glasgow | Germany; Claire Feyler; Nadine Jacqueline Weber | Japan; Sayaka Kizawa; Kana Murabayashi | |
| 2024 | (Germany) Bremen | Germany; Judith Wolf; Danielle Holzer | Switzerland; Sava Baumann; Chiara Dotoli | Czech Republic; Veronika Kripnerová; Blanka Adamová |
| 2025 | (Germany) Göppingen | Germany; Danielle Holzer; Judith Wolf | Switzerland; Sava Baumann; Chiara Dotoli | Japan; Sayaka Tokuhiro; Nana Yamashita |
| 2026 | (Germany) Ludwigsburg | Germany; Danielle Holzer; Judith Wolf | Switzerland; Valerie Suter; Chiara Dotoli | Japan; Sayaka Tokuhiro; Nana Yamashita |
