= 2007 UCI Indoor Cycling World Championships =

- Venue: Winterthur, Switzerland
- Date: 9 November–11 November 2007
- Stadium: Eulachhalle
- Nations participating: 21
- Cyclists participating: 144

The logo of the Indoor Cycling world championship in Winterthur

The 2007 UCI Indoor Cycling World Championships took place in Winterthur in switzerland from 9 to 11 November and crowned world champions in the cycling disciplines of cycle ball and artistic cycling. Germany managed to get all seven gold medals at this championship and won 11 medals in total - including all three in men's single artistic cycling.

The whole event was located in the stadium Eulachhalle, originally the home stadium of the handball club Pfadi Winterthur. It was actually the second indoor cycling world championship held in Winterthur after the one in 1997.

In total 144 athletes out of 21 nations took part in the competition. The participating nations were all from Europe and Asia, except for a Tchad starting Czech team.

== Organisation ==
The idea to give Winterthur another world championship indoor cycling after the one in 1997 came from Marianne Kern, member of the RMV Pfungen and member of the management board of Swiss Cycling for indoor cycling. After the candidature of Winterthur was made public the other candidates revoke their candidatures so that Winterthur could perform the World Championship. The whole event had a budget of 750'000 swiss francs - after the end of the WC they made a profit of 29'600 SFr.

=== The organising committee ===
- Daniel Frei, president
- Max Wullschleger, finances
- Marianne Kern, sport
- Toni Hostettler, marketing
- Daniel Spengler, infrastructure

The members of the OC are all out of the city and the region of Winterthur.

== Venue ==
The whole event took place in the Eulachhalle in Winterthur. During the event one hall was used for the sporting events and the other was an event hall, where you could eat and also a cultural program was there. In the entrance area there were some exhibitors, a bar, a coat check and an information desk. The Eulachhalle was sold out during the whole event with 3,280 spectators, a hall record.

== Medals table ==
Rank	Nation	Gold	Silver	Bronze	Total
1	Germany (GER)	6	3	2	11
2	Austria (AUT)	0	3	0	3
3	Switzerland (SUI)	0	0	3	3
4	Czech Republic (CZE)	0	0	1	1
Totals (4 entries)		6	6	6	18

== Cycle ball ==
=== Modus ===
The competitors started in three different groups, ordered after their strengthen. In group A the fight for the medals took place. In all groups they compete in the league mode against each other. For group B and C the table afterward is the final results.

In group A there was also an intermediate stage where the 2nd- against the 5th-placed and the 3rd against the 4th placed played. The winners came into a final round with the winner of the first round. The two first teams of the final round make out the world cup winner in a final game at the end.

=== Group A ===
In the group A Germany could win the final game against Austria with 6:4. Top goal scorer was the Austrian player Martin Lingg.

place	country	player 1	player 2
1.	Germany	Thomas Abel	Christian Hess
2.	Austria	Martin Lingg	Markus Bröll
3.	Switzerland	Timo Reichen	Peter Jiricek
4.	Czech Republic	Robert Loskot	Pavel Vitula
5.	Croatia	Jasmin Fazlic	Michael Posedi
6.	Belgium	Rudy Covent	Peter Martens

=== Relegation game group A/B ===
Japan - Belgium 3:2

=== Group B ===
place	country	player 1	player 2	GD	Pts.
1.	Japan	Naoya Kinoshita	Ko Matsuda	24:14	9
2.	Romania	Dorian Doroftei	Mircea Tric	14:9	8
3.	Spain	Daniel Cortés Balsalobre	Florencio Monge	11:15	4
4.	Slovakia	Dalibor Roznik	Robert Rizmann	8:15	3
5.	France	Frédérique Marcoux	Michel Maillavin	12:15	2

=== Relegation game group B/C ===
Hong Kong - France 6:4

=== Group C ===
place	country	player 1	player 2	GD	Pts.
1.	Hong Kong	Man Fai Lo	Wing Tai Ho	39:8	16
2.	Hungary	Tamás Szitás	Vilmos Toma	37:15	13
3.	Malaysia	Abd Halim Samsinar	Dahlan Mohd Zikri	28:19	6
4.	Macau	U Hin Lai	Run Quin Lin	4:66	0

== Artistic cycling ==
There were competitions in single, pair and four-man-team for women and in single and pair for men.

=== Modus ===
At first there was a qualification round with all athletes. The four best athletes could fight for the medals in the final.

=== Women ===
==== Single ====
In total 23 athletes out of 12 nations participated in that discipline.

final table

place	country	competitor	max pts.	final pts.
1.	Germany	Anja Scheu	338.00	331.60
2.	Austria	Sarah Kohl	335.40	328.51
3.	Germany	Sandra Beck	336.80	326.35
4.	Czech Republic	Martina Trnková	336.60	322.27

==== Pair ====
In total 14 teams out of 9 nations participated in that discipline. The German team Schulheis/Sprinkmeier made in qualification round with 316.39 points a new world record.

final table

place	country	competitor 1	competitor 2	max pts.	final pts.
1.	Germany	Katrin Schultheis	Sandra Sprinkmeier	325.40	311.61
2.	Germany	Jasmin Soika	Katharina Wurster	315.60	302.37
3.	Czech Republic	Andrea Petríckova	Iva Valesová	304.00	288.61
4.	Switzerland	Barbara Morf	Nina Bommeli	300.00	288.07

==== Four-Man-Team ====
Beside the finalists Hungary and France had a team, but they had both no chances for the finals.

final table

place	country	team	max pts.	final pts.
1.	Germany	Manuela Dieterle; Katja Gaisser; Simone Rudolf; Ines Rudolf	368.60	356.23
2.	Austria	Kathrin Hagen; Melanie Melbinger; Martina Schwar; Silke Melbinger	371.80	352.31
3.	Switzerland	Angela Bolliger; Daniela Keller; Doris Roth; Corinna Paul	365.00	345.87
4.	Czech Republic	Markéta Tobolíková; Jana Oplocká; Michaela Matousková; Katerina Pribylová	366.80	331.47

=== Men ===
==== Single ====
In total 23 Athletes out of 13 nations participated in that discipline.

final table

place	country	competitor	max pts.	final pts.
1.	Germany	Robin Hartmann	349.60	347.25
2.	Germany	David Schnabel	348.20	346.97
3.	Germany	Michael Brugger	346.20	342.81
4.	Czech Republic	Milan Krivánek	332.60	325.27

==== Pair ====
In total 12 Doubles out of 7 nations participated in that discipline.

final table

place	country	competitor 1	competitor 2	max pts.	final pts.
1.	Germany	Felix Niederberger	Jonas Niederberger	328.40	320.33
2.	Germany	Viktor Volk	Manuel Huber	321.80	306.88
3.	Switzerland	Beni Jost	Joel Schmid	299.00	294.53
4.	Hong Kong	Sum Yee Yu	Tin Hin Lo	298.20	290.30

== Websites ==
- Official website of the Indoor Cycling-WC 2007 (in German)
