= Eulachhalle =

Arena in Winterthur, Switzerland

Coordinates: 47.5034°N 8.7118°E

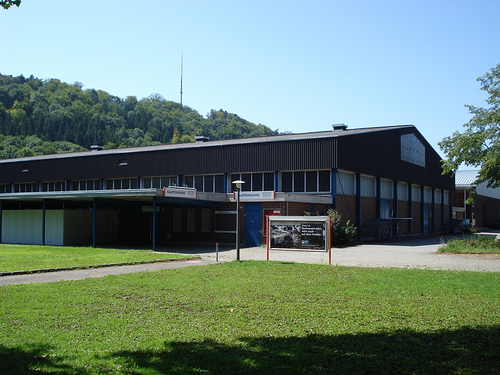
The entrance area of Eulachhalle

Eulachhalle is an arena located in Winterthur, Switzerland. It is primarily used for team handball and is the home arena of Pfadi Winterthur and Yellow Winterthur. Eulachhalle holds 2,300 people.

The heavy metal band Iron Maiden performed a concert here during the Virtual XI World Tour, on 2 October 1998.

In 2008, the arena was the host of the finals of the men's and women's EuroFloorball Cup final rounds. The Arena has also twice been the host of the UCI Indoor Cycling World Championships, in 1997 and 2007. At the 2007 world championships there was a record number of 3,280 spectators in the arena.

Eulachhalle also holds regular trade fairs and concerts.
