= Schnetzer =

Schnetzer is a surname. Notable people with the surname include:

- Ben Schnetzer, American actor
- Ferenc Schnetzer (1867–1944), Hungarian military officer and politician
- Patrick Schnetzer (born 1993), Austrian cycle ball player
- Ricardo Schnetzer (1953–2026), Brazilian voice actor
- Stephen Schnetzer (born 1948), American actor

== See also ==
- Schnitzer, another surname
