= Stunt riding =

Stunt riding may refer to:

- Artistic cycling on bicycles
- Motorcycle stunt riding on motorized vehicles
- Trick riding on horses
