= Viola Brand =

German artistic cyclist (born 1994)

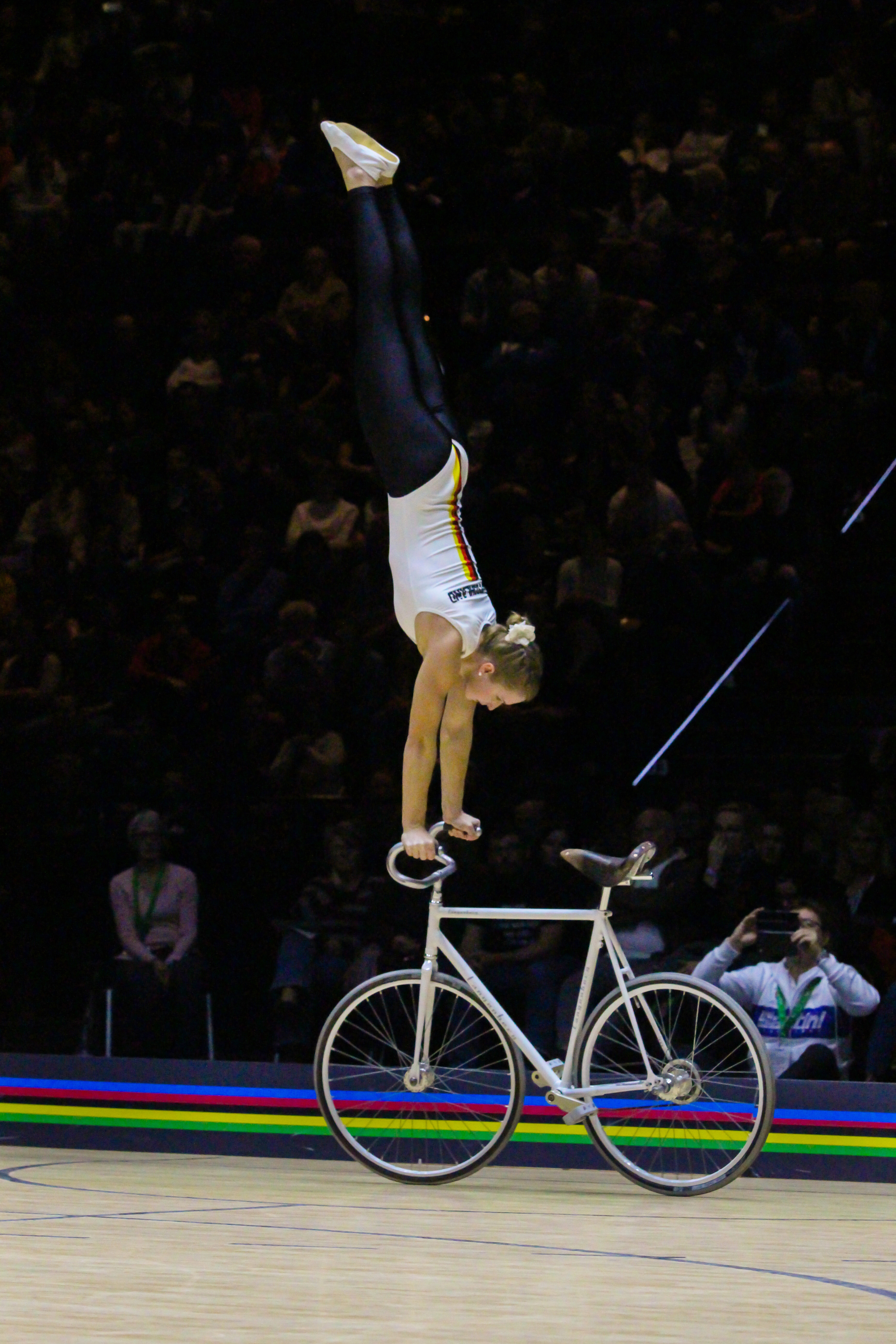
- Viola Brand doing a handstand in 2019

Personal information
- Born: 28 June 1994 (age 32) Backnang, Germany

Cycling career
- Sport: Cycling
- Discipline: Artistic cycling
- Role: Single

Major wins
- German Champion (2017); European Champion (2018)
Medal record
Representing Germany
Single artistic cycling
World Championships
Silver medal – second place	2016 Stuttgart	Women Elite
Silver medal – second place	2017 Dornbirn	Women Elite
Silver medal – second place	2019 Basel	Women Elite
European Championships
Gold medal – first place	2018 Wiesbaden	Women Elite

Viola Brand (born 28 June 1994) is a German cyclist specialising in artistic cycling. She has won national and European championships twice each, and the silver medal three times in the World Championships.

== Personal life ==
Brand was born in Backnang, Germany. She tried to climb the training bike as early as five years old, then still failing to reach the pedals. Her elder brother did artistic cycling before her, and both he and Brand were coached by their mother. She started training artistic cycling at six years old.

Brand is studying clinical nutrition at Hohenheim University, Stuttgart. As of February 2021, she is writing the thesis for her master's degree.

== Professional career ==
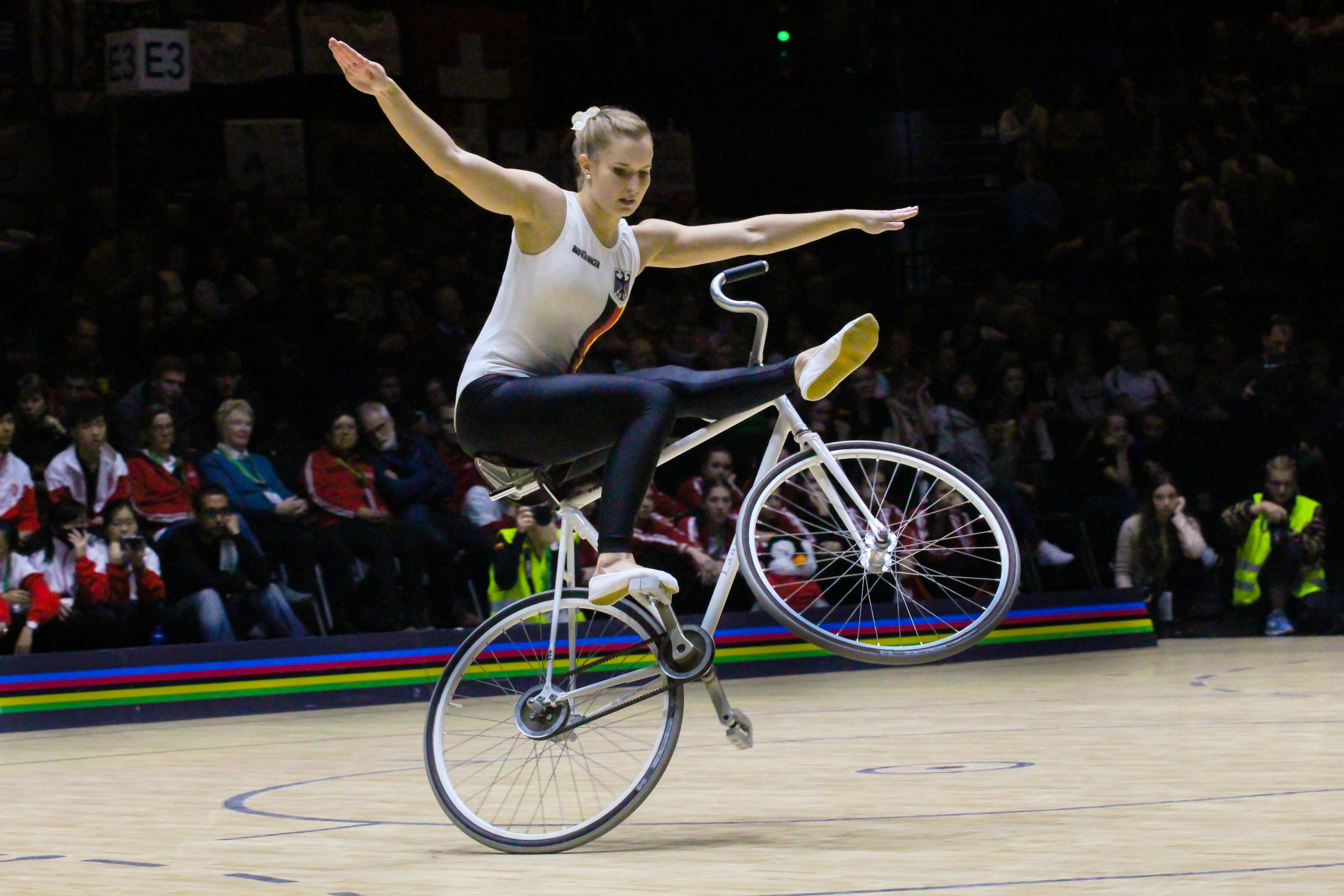
Brand at the World Championships in Basel 2019

Brand's sports club is RSV Unterweissach (located in Weissach im Tal). She joined the German national sports team at the age of 15, and won the Junior European Championships in 2012.

She set a world record at the European Junior Championships in 2011 in her age group, and another world record at the regular European Championships in 2018. Her best personal score was 194.71 points in German Masters 2019.

Brand spent years perfecting her choreography and learning new stunts. It took her seven years of training to be able to do a handstand on the handlebar, the stunt Brand is most proud of, and in June 2019 she was able to perform a Maute jump for the first time, jumping from the saddle to the handlebars.

Brand participated in a total of five World Championships, missing qualification in 2018 after a competition which German national coach Dieter Maute called "very hard". Since each nation can only send two participants, Brand stated that "qualification is much harder than winning a medal at the World Championships". Brand uses a special belt-driven bicycle, and her motto, inscribed on the toothed belt, is "Du musst den Kampf mehr lieben als den Sieg" ("You have to love the fight more than the victory").

Her last official competition was in Basel at the World Championships in December 2019, where she won a silver medal, making it her third Vice Championship. In February 2020 she announced her retirement, although she continues to perform for exhibitions and to promote her sport. Brand hopes to someday see artistic cycling become one of the Olympic sports.

== Statistics ==
=== Personal best ===
Her best results, according to data from the Union Cycliste Internationale (UCI) and German Cycling Federation (BDR):

Artistic Cycling – Single women
Competition	City	Date	Result	Position	References
German Masters 1	Lemgo (Germany)	6 September 2014	173.78	2nd	
German Masters 2	Klein-Winternheim (Germany)	20 September 2014	172.80	2nd	
German Championships	Denkendorf (Germany)	18 October 2014	175.30	2nd	
German Masters 1	Bruckmühl (Germany)	5 September 2015	175.98	1st	
German Masters 3	Mörfelden-Walldorf (Germany)	3 October 2015	179.99	2nd	
German Championships	Lübbecke (Germany)	16 October 2015	173.06	2nd	
3-Nations Cup	Koblach (Austria)	7 November 2015	180.41	1st	
German Masters 1	Oberschleißheim (Germany)	10 September 2016	171.60	2nd	
German Masters 3	Biberach an der Riss (Germany)	8 October 2016	182.75	1st	
World Championships	Stuttgart (Germany)	2 December 2016	173.75	2nd	
German Masters 1	Weil im Schönbuch (Germany)	9 September 2017	169.31	3rd	
German Masters 2	Öhringen (Germany)	23 September 2017	184.80	2nd	
German Masters 3	Gutach (Germany)	7 October 2017	185.28	2nd	
German Championships	Hamburg (Germany)	20 October 2017	183.94	1st	
World Championships	Dornbirn (Austria)	24 November 2017	183.29	2nd	
World Cup	Prague (Czech Republic)	10 February 2018	176.04	3rd	
European Championships	Wiesbaden (Germany)	1 June 2018	186.58	1st	
World Cup	Heerlen (Netherlands)	30 June 2018	162.36	3rd	
World Cup	Hong Kong (China)	12 August 2018	175.93	1st	
German Championships	Neresheim (Germany)	19 October 2018	180.66	2nd	
World Cup	Bokod (Hungary)	10 August 2019	180.69	1st	
German Masters 2	Biberach an der Riss (Germany)	21 September 2019	193.39	1st	
German Masters 3	Weil im Schönbuch (Germany)	5 October 2019	181,97	1st	
German Championships	Moers (Germany)	18 October 2019	183.00	2nd	
3-Nations Cup	Baar, Switzerland (Switzerland)	23 November 2019	192.09	1st	
World Cup	Erlenbach (Germany)	30 November 2019	181.8	1st	
World Championships	Basel (Switzerland)	6 December 2019	185.14	2nd	

== Other activities ==
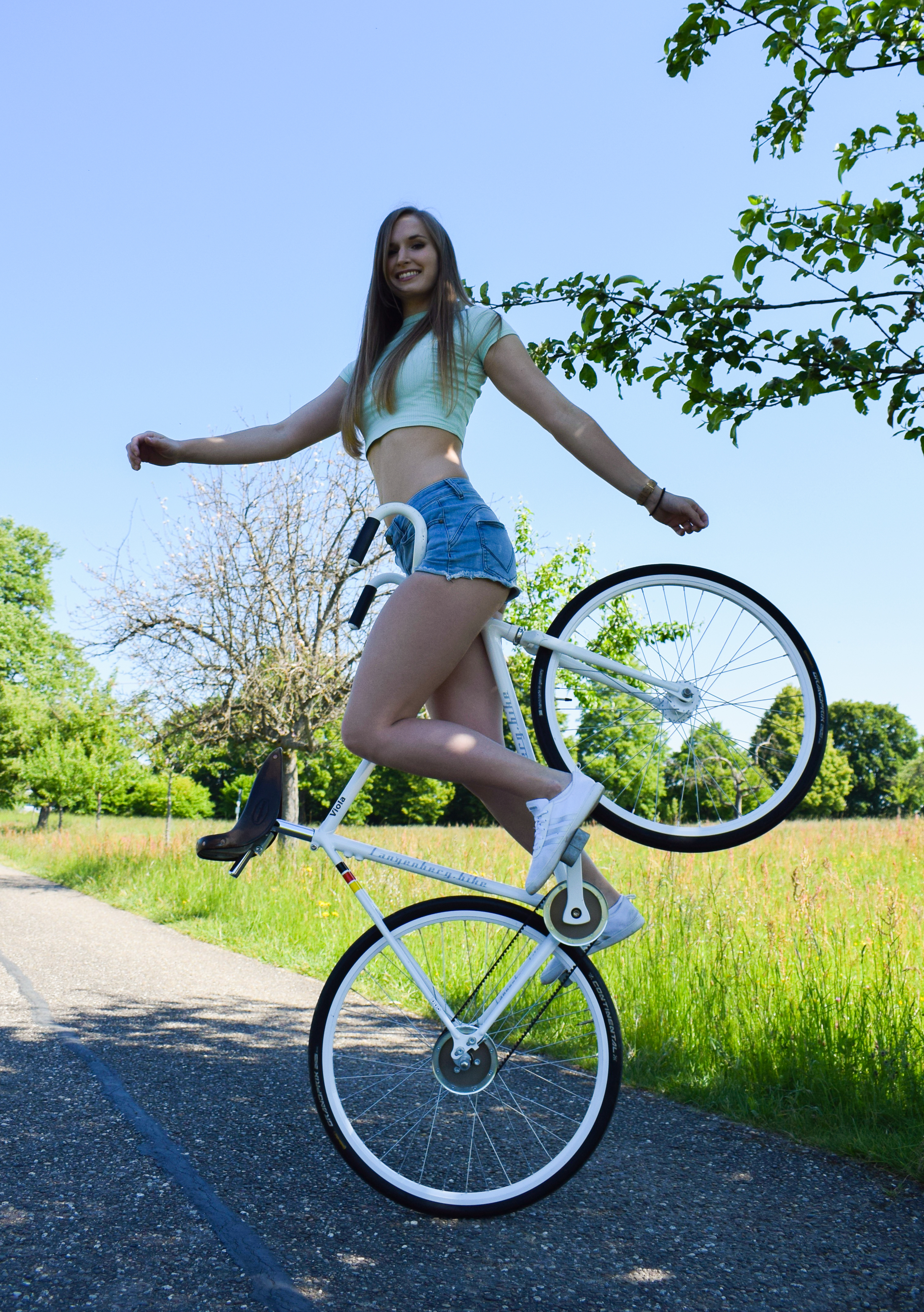
Brand doing a stunt outdoors (2020)

In 2017, Brand started an Instagram account after a friend suggested it, and by July 2018 had gathered over 100k followers. As of February 2021, she has almost 400k followers. Her channel piqued the interest of staff from The Ellen DeGeneres Show, which Brand used to watch to improve her English skills, and in February 2020 she was a guest in the show. In 2018, she participated in the talent show Das Supertalent but failed to reach the final. In 2019, she toured with the show Feuerwerk der Turnkunst through 22 cities in Germany, with her performance being lauded.

After her February 2020 retirement from professional sports, Brand announced that she would like to focus on appearances in shows and her social media. In early 2021, she signed a contract with the Golden State Warriors to perform during the halftime show, virtually at first due to the ongoing COVID-19 pandemic; in early 2022 she performed live during several NBA halftime shows. In July 2021, the Stuttgarter Zeitung reported on an underwater photography session featuring Brand with her bicycle. In May 2022, she was featured in a video by Danny MacAskill.
