= Corinna Hein =

German cyclist (born 1983)

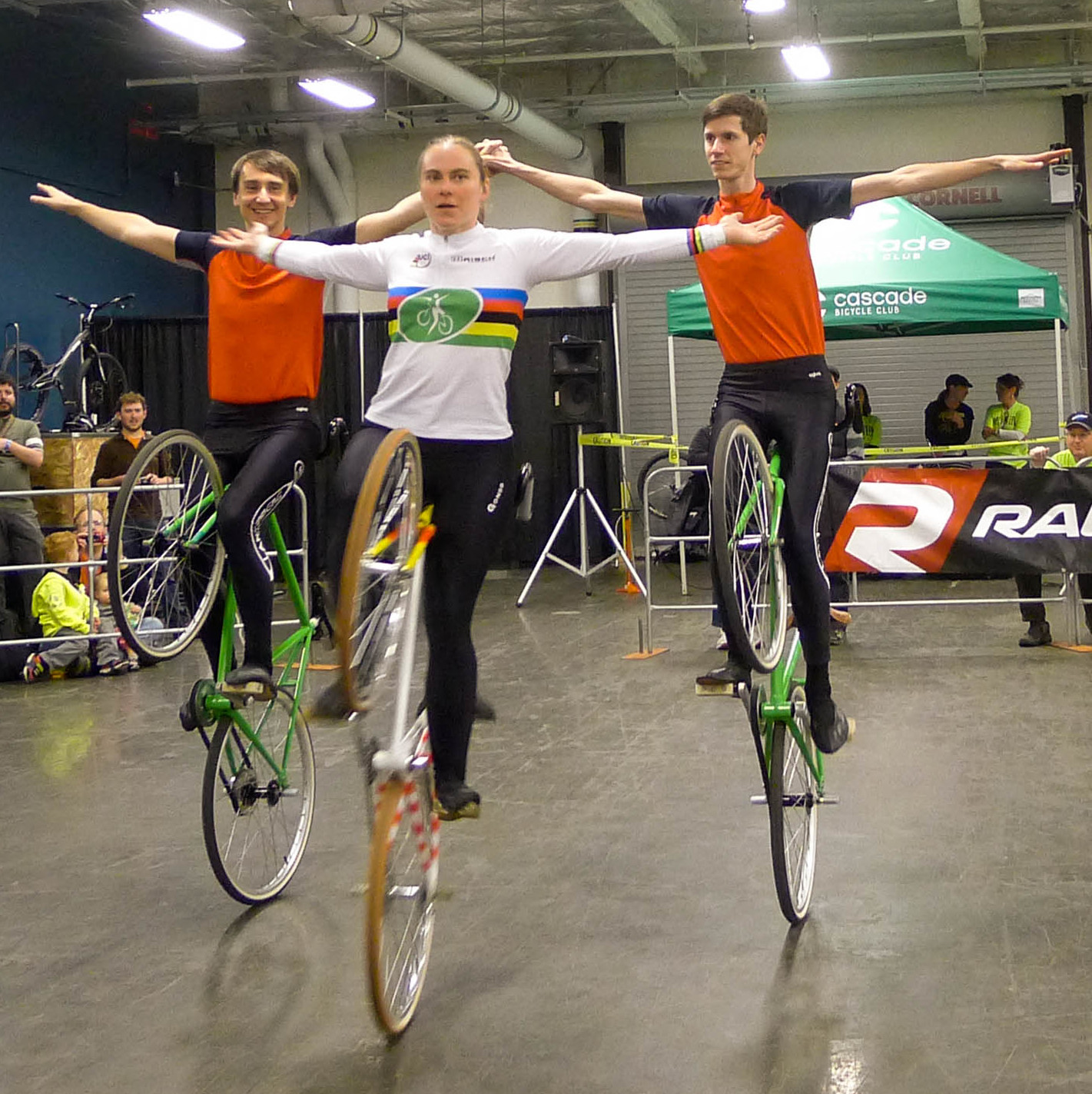
- Hein (middle) with Lukas Matla and Stefan Muso in 2014
- Born: 6 February 1983 (age 42); Achern, Germany
- Other names: Corinna Biethan
- Occupation: Cyclist
- Known for: World Artistic cycling Champion

Corinna Hein born Corinna Biethan (born 6 February 1983) is a German indoor cyclist. She has been World Artistic cycling Champion five times and the German champion seven times (2016).

== Life ==
Hein was born in Achern in 1983. From 2002 to 2007 Corinna Biethan studied material sciences at the Technical University of Darmstadt. She became a doctor of Engineering. She liked to juggle and ride a unicycle. She studied the art of cycling with her father, Werner Hein and trains at Mörfelder Kunstradfahrer. She became a member of the SKV Mörfelden team in 2006.

She won the World Artistic cycling championship in 2009.

One of her trainers was a friend named Heike Marklein.

She married before she went to Brno to claim her fifth UCI World title as Corinna Biethan.

She has been World Champion five times and the German champion seven times (2016).
