= Pospíšil brothers =

Cycle ball players

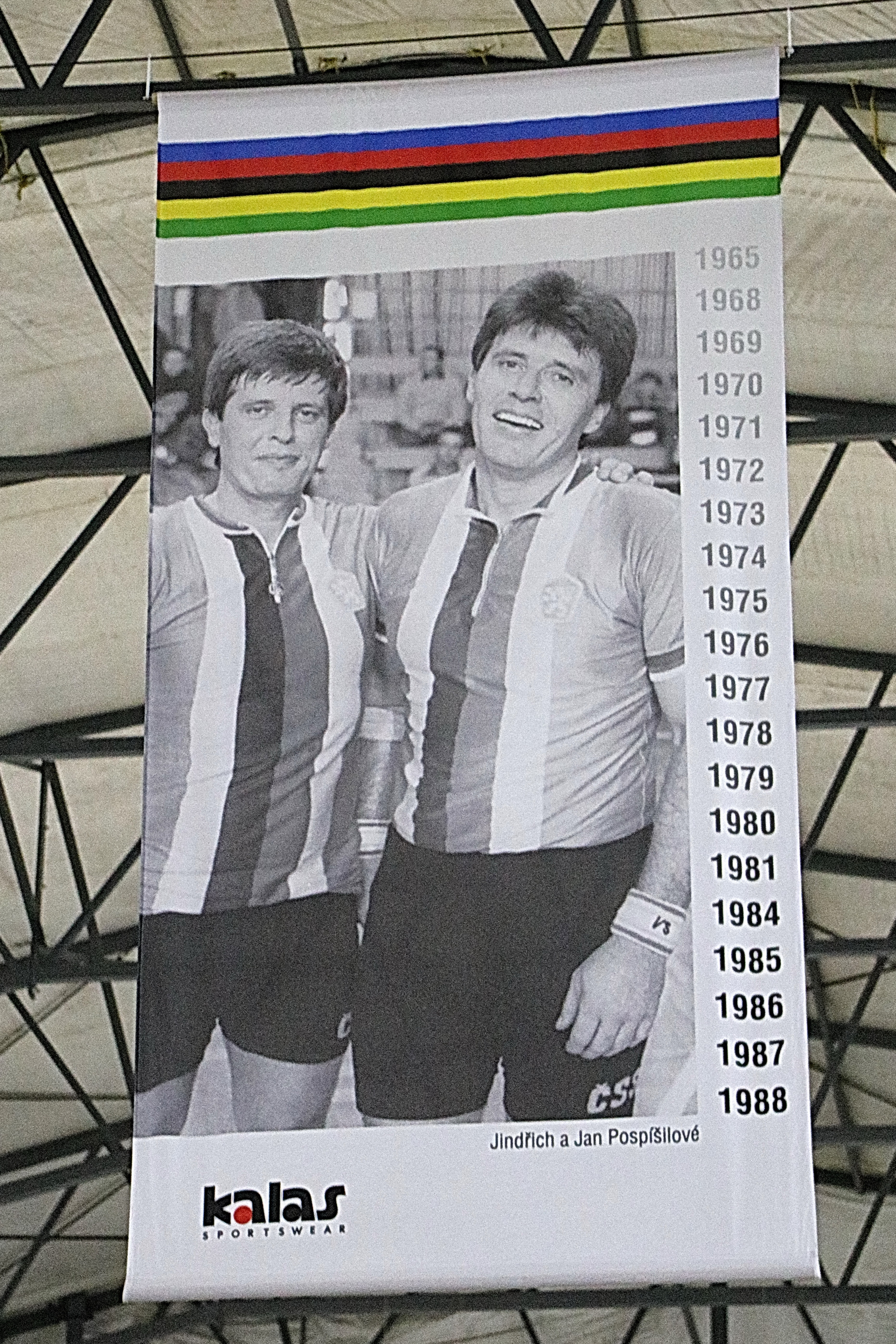
Pospíšil brothers in Hall of Fame of the Czech cycling sport - portrait at Prague-Motol Velodrome

The Pospíšil brothers are Czechoslovak players of cycle ball who won a world championship twenty times. Jindřich Pospíšil was born on 23 March 1942, Jan Pospíšil on 25 April 1945, both in Brno, Czechoslovakia.

Before they won their first golden championship medals, Jindřich had already won a silver and bronze with his previous partner Jaroslav Svoboda. Then the brothers together won silver medals at the championship in 1964 in Copenhagen. They won their last championship when Jan was 43 and Jindřich 46 years old.

== World champions ==
- 1965, Prague
- 1968, Kassel
- 1969, Erfurt
- 1970, Ostrava
- 1971, Baden
- 1972, Offenburg
- 1973, Vienna
- 1974, Heerlen
- 1975, Ghent
- 1976, Münster
- 1977, Brno
- 1978, Herning
- 1979, Schiltigheim
- 1980, Rheinfelden
- 1981, Heerlen
- 1984, Schiltigheim
- 1985, St. Gallen
- 1986, Genk
- 1987, Herning
- 1988, Ludwigshafen
