= Katrin Schultheis and Sandra Sprinkmeier =

The cyclists Katrin Schultheis (born 25 January 1984 in Mainz) and Sandra Sprinkmeier (born 31 May 1984 in Mainz) are a former team of artistic cyclists. They were world champions six times.

They are members of RV Mainz-Ebersheim.

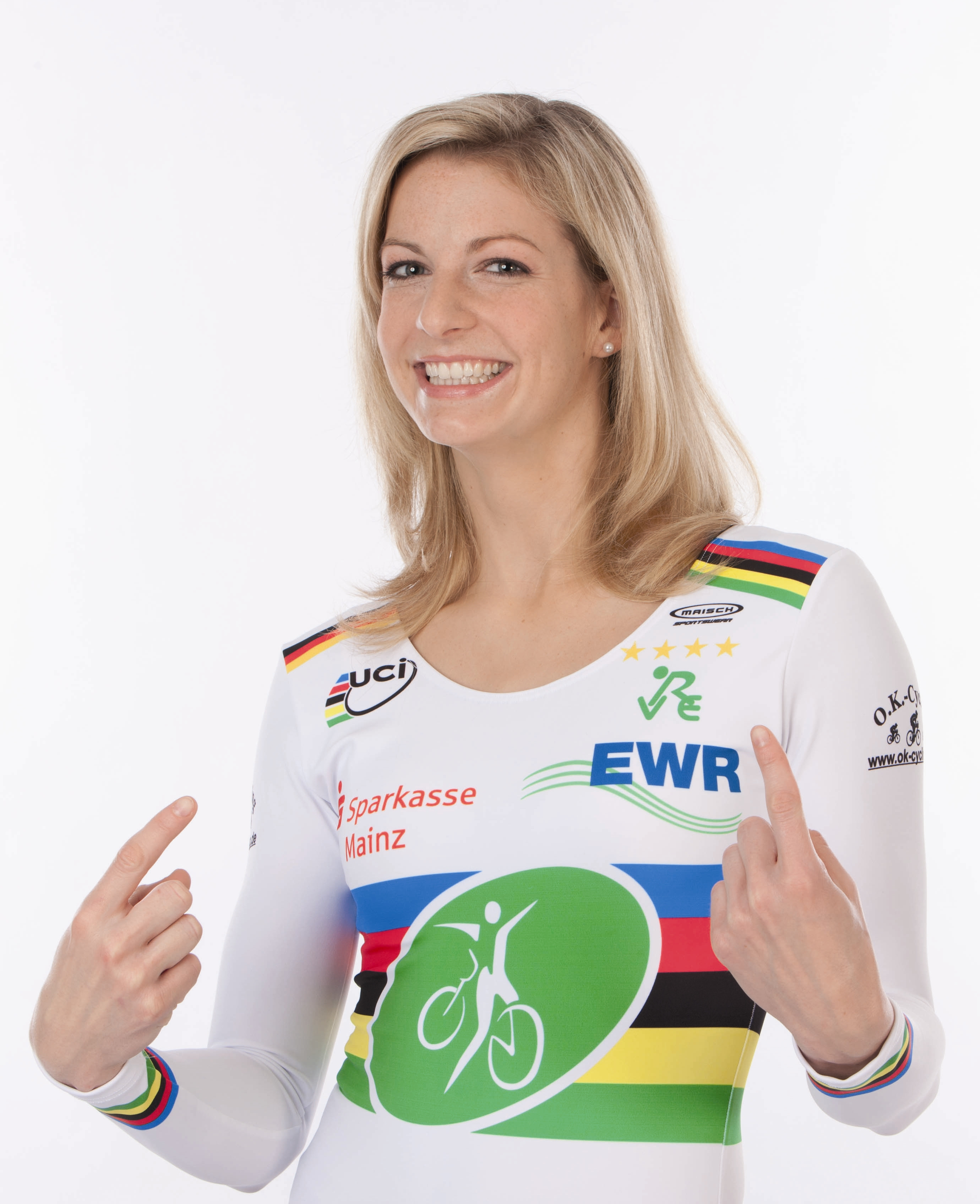
Katrin Schultheis (2011)

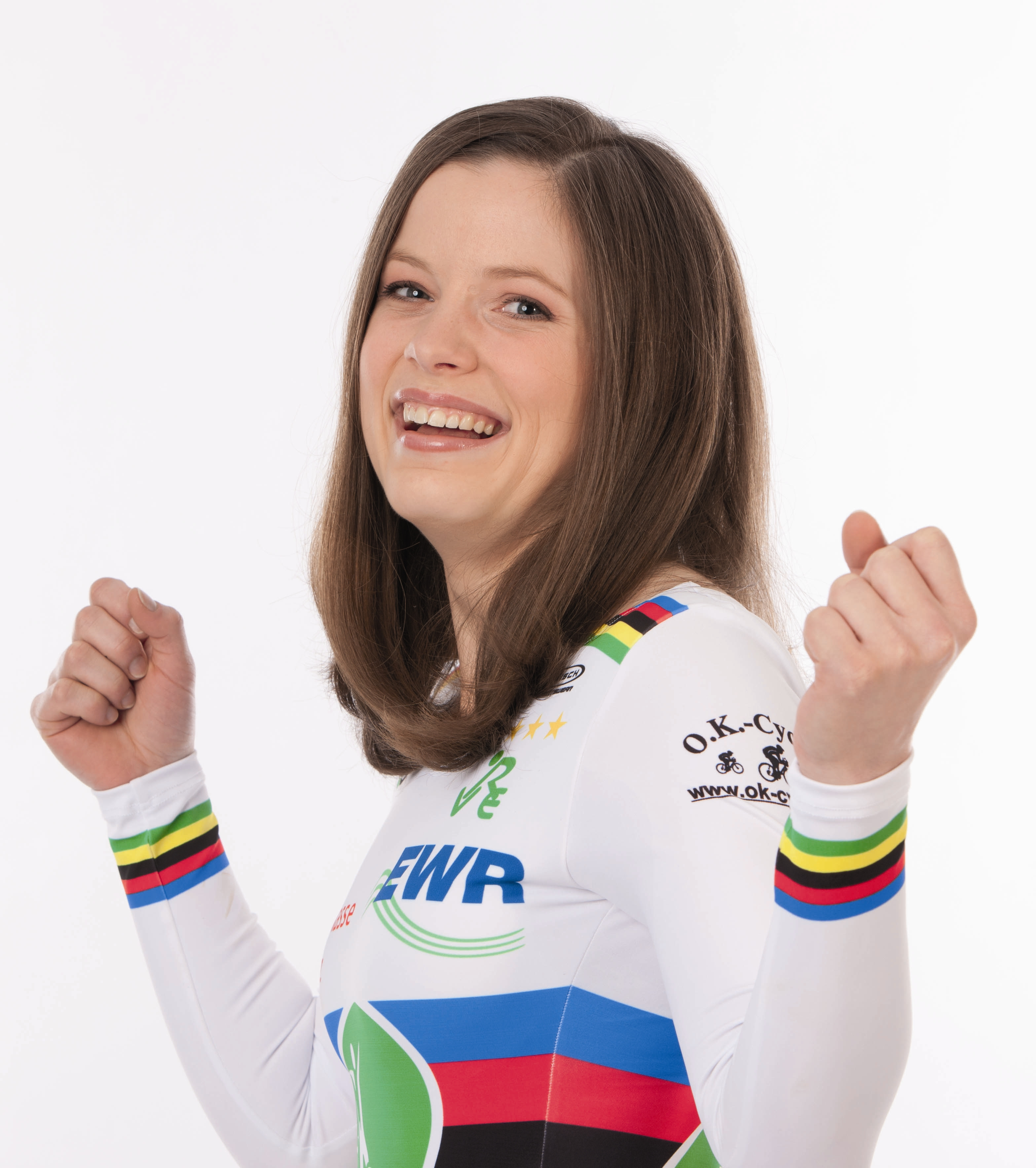
Sandra Sprinkmeier (2011)

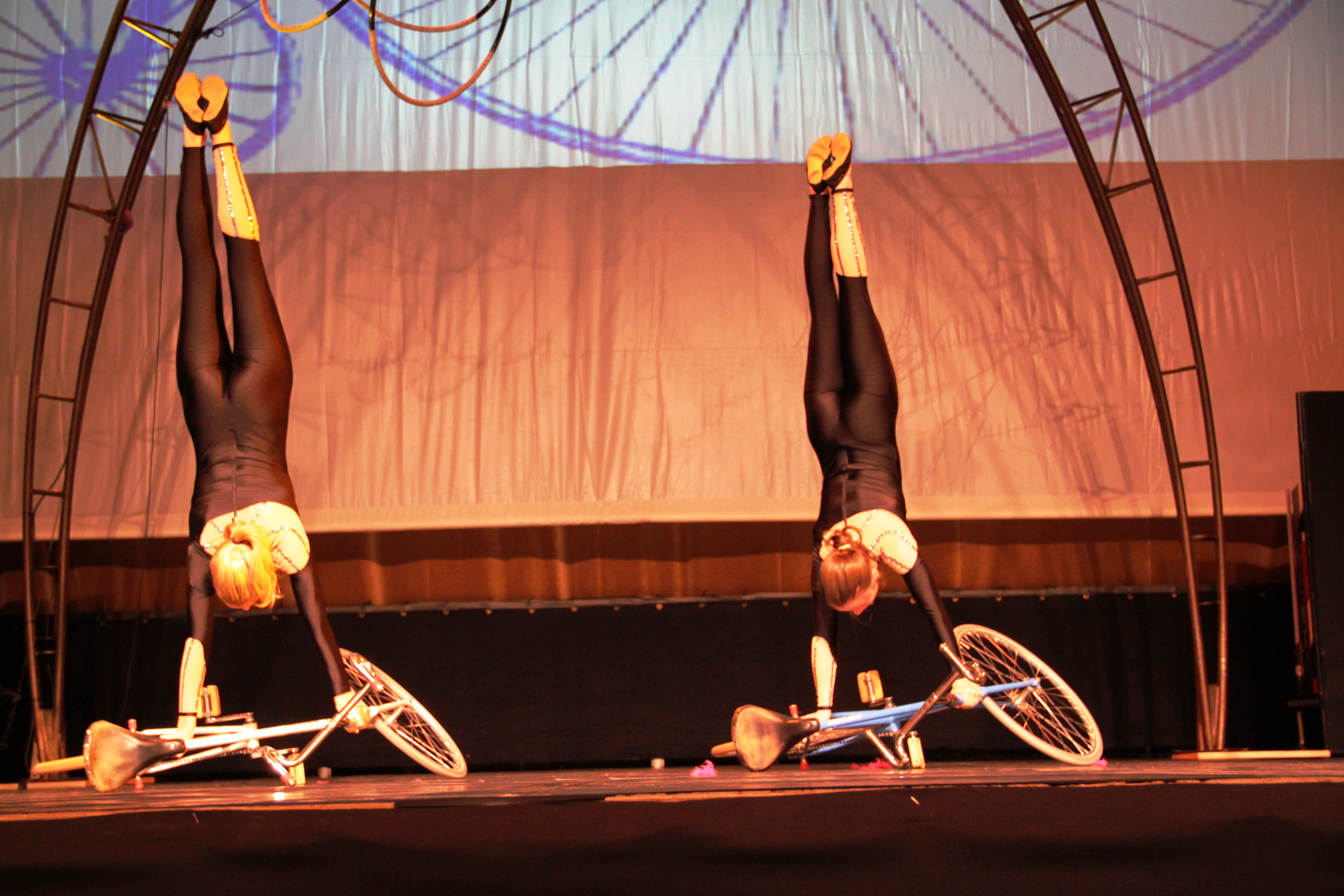
show program

== Successes ==
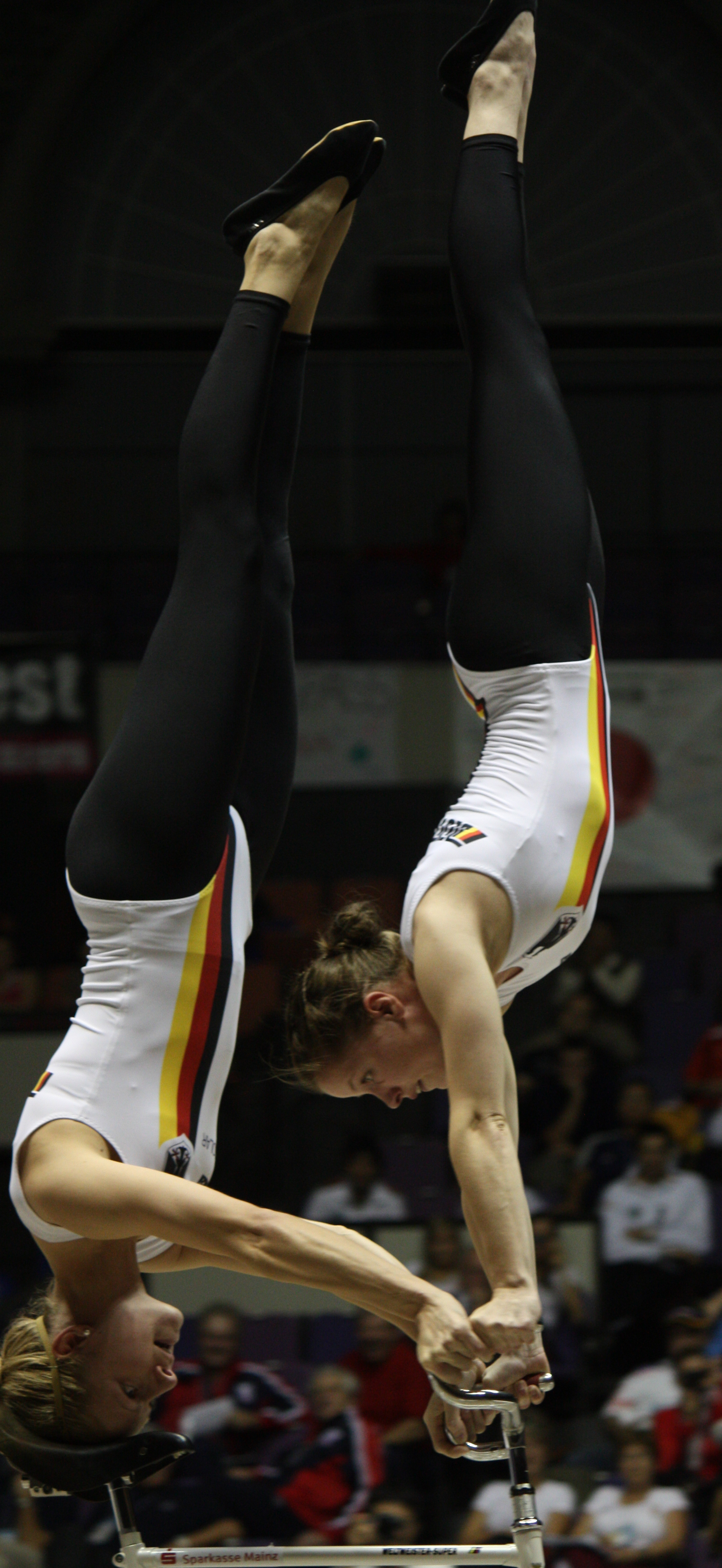
handstand / headstand at the World Championships 2011

2013

- new world-record 165.12 points, first cyclists over 165 points.

2012

- world-champions in Aschaffenburg
- German champions
- winners of the German-Masters-Series

2011

- world-champions in Kagoshima
- winners of the German-Masters-Series
- new world-record 160.43 points, first cyclists over 160 points.

2010

- vice-world-champions in Stuttgart
- winners of the German-Masters-Series
- new world-record 156.33 points

2009

- world-champions in Tavira (Portugal)
- UCI-Ranking-winners
- German champions
- new world-record 150.75 points

2008

- world-champions in Dornbirn (Austria)
- UCI-Ranking-winners
- winners of the German-Masters-Series

2007

- world-champions in Winterthur (Switzerland)
- new world-record 316.39 points
- UCI-Ranking-winners
- winners of the German-Masters-Series
