= Patrick Schnetzer =

Austrian cyclist

Patrick Schnetzer (born 15 November 1993) is an Austrian cycle ball player. He is considered one of the best current cycle ball players, having won eight of the last eleven cycle ball world championships.

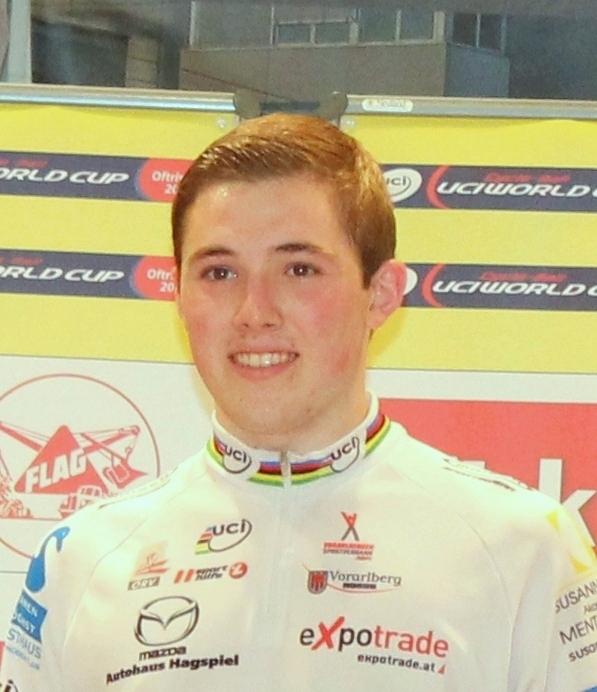
Patrick Schnetzer beim Radball-Weltcup 2012 in Oftringen
