= Cycle ball =

Sport similar to association football played on bicycles

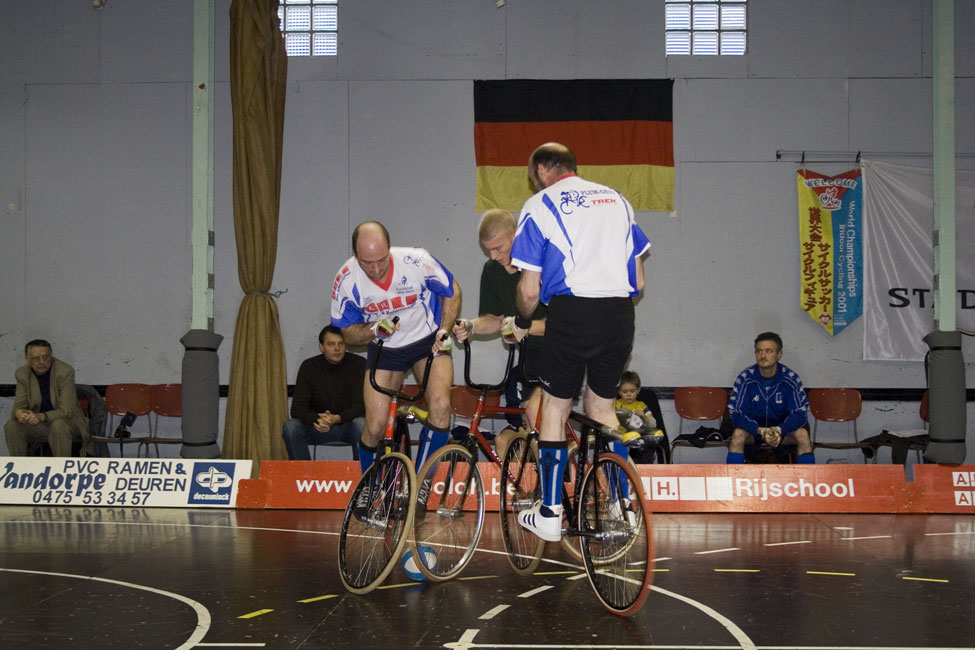
- Cycle ball
- Highest governing body: Union Cycliste Internationale
- First played: 1883

Characteristics
- Contact: No
- Team members: Yes
- Mixed-sex: No
- Type: Cycle sports

Presence
- Country or region: Europe, Japan
- Olympic: No
- World Games: 1989

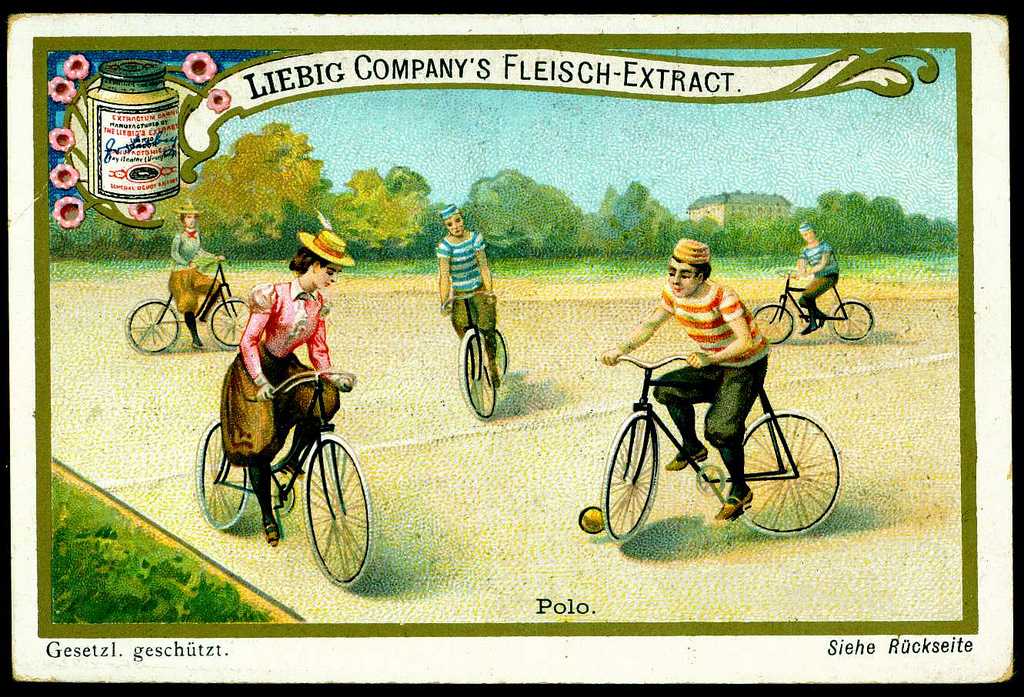
Cycle-ball, early 20th century

Cycle-ball, also known as "radball" (from German), is a sport similar to association football played on bicycles. The two people on each team ride a fixed-gear bicycle with no brakes or freewheel. The ball is controlled by the bike and the head, except when defending the goal.

== History ==
The sport was introduced in 1883 by American artistic cyclist Nicholas Edward Kaufmann. The first match was played on September 14 that year between Kaufmann and fellow artistic cyclist John Featherly. Its first world championships were in 1929. In the early 20th century, the sport spread to Germany; in the modern day, Germany is the location of the sport's largest fanbase. Cycle-ball is also popular in Austria, Switzerland, and the Czech Republic. The most successful players were the Pospíšil brothers of Czechoslovakia, world champions 20 times between 1965 and 1988.

Cycle ball court

Closely related is artistic cycling in which the athletes perform a kind of gymnastics on cycles.

== Rules ==
A game of cycle ball is played by two teams of two players in two halves, each lasting seven minutes. Matches take place on a rectangular field measuring 14 meters in length and 11 meters in width. Goals are square and measure two by two meters.

== Championships ==
- UCI Indoor Cycling World Championships since 1930 (Men) / 2023 (Women) / Artistic since 1956/1959 / Pair 1986 / Quartets 2003
- Cycle-ball at the 2005 and 2007 Asian Indoor Games
- Cycle-ball at the 1989 World Games
- European Cycleball Championship since 1967
- 15th Asian Indoor Cycling Championships in Hong Kong 2024
- UEC Indoor Cycling Juniors European Championships (Union Européenne de Cyclisme)
- Club Competitions

== Results ==
Since 1.1.2010 to 1.1.2026:

Men / Women

== Ranking ==
Last Update: 1.1.2026

=== Men ===
Since 1930

Rank Matches Points

1 Germany 484 4122

2 Austria 475 4016

3 Switzerland 498 3884

4 France 466 3687

5 Czechia 474 3641

6 Liechtenstein 21 3516

7 Croatia 70 3320

8 USA 32 3225

9 Romania 60 3188

10 Belgium 434 3149

11 Japan 313 3101

12 Spain 49 3020

13 Serbia 5 2983

14 Denmark 195 2961

15 Sweden 122 2938

16 Hungary 118 2913

17 Türkiye 5 2832

18 Italy 61 2816

19 Slovakia 52 2773

20 Hong Kong 255 2769

21 Norway 11 2769

22 Netherlands 132 2766

23 Armenia 35 2728

24 Australia 68 2637

25 Ghana 5 2608

26 Jordan 16 2459

27 Malaysia 234 2451

28 Canada 56 2370

29 Thailand 25 2284

30 Great Britain 21 2069

31 Macau 52 1604

Ranking generated from a database of 2479 matches.

Ranking generated at 09:42:38 on Tuesday, 16 December, 2025.

=== Women ===
Since 2023

Rank Matches Points

1 Germany 11 3472

2 Switzerland 11 3201

3 Czechia 9 2961

4 Japan 11 2880

5 Austria 4 2486

Ranking generated from a database of 23 matches.

Ranking generated at 09:42:47 on Tuesday, 16 December, 2025.

== National Teams ==
Have 5 women (Since 2023) and 31 men (Since 1930) teams at 1.1.2026.

=== Men ===
Africa (1): Ghana

Americas (2): Canada - United States

Asia & Oceania (7): Australia - Japan - Hong Kong - Jordan - Malaysia - Thailand - Macau

Europe (21): Germany - Switzerland - Czech Republic - Austria - France - Liechtenstein - Croatia - Romania - Belgium - Spain - Serbia - Denmark - Sweden - Hungary - Turkey - Italy - Slovakia - Norway - Netherlands - Armenia - United Kingdom

=== Women ===
Asia & Oceania (1): Japan

Europe (4): Germany - Switzerland - Czech Republic - Austria

== See also ==
- Cycle polo
- Hardcourt Bike Polo
