= Artistic cycling =

Form of competitive indoor cycling

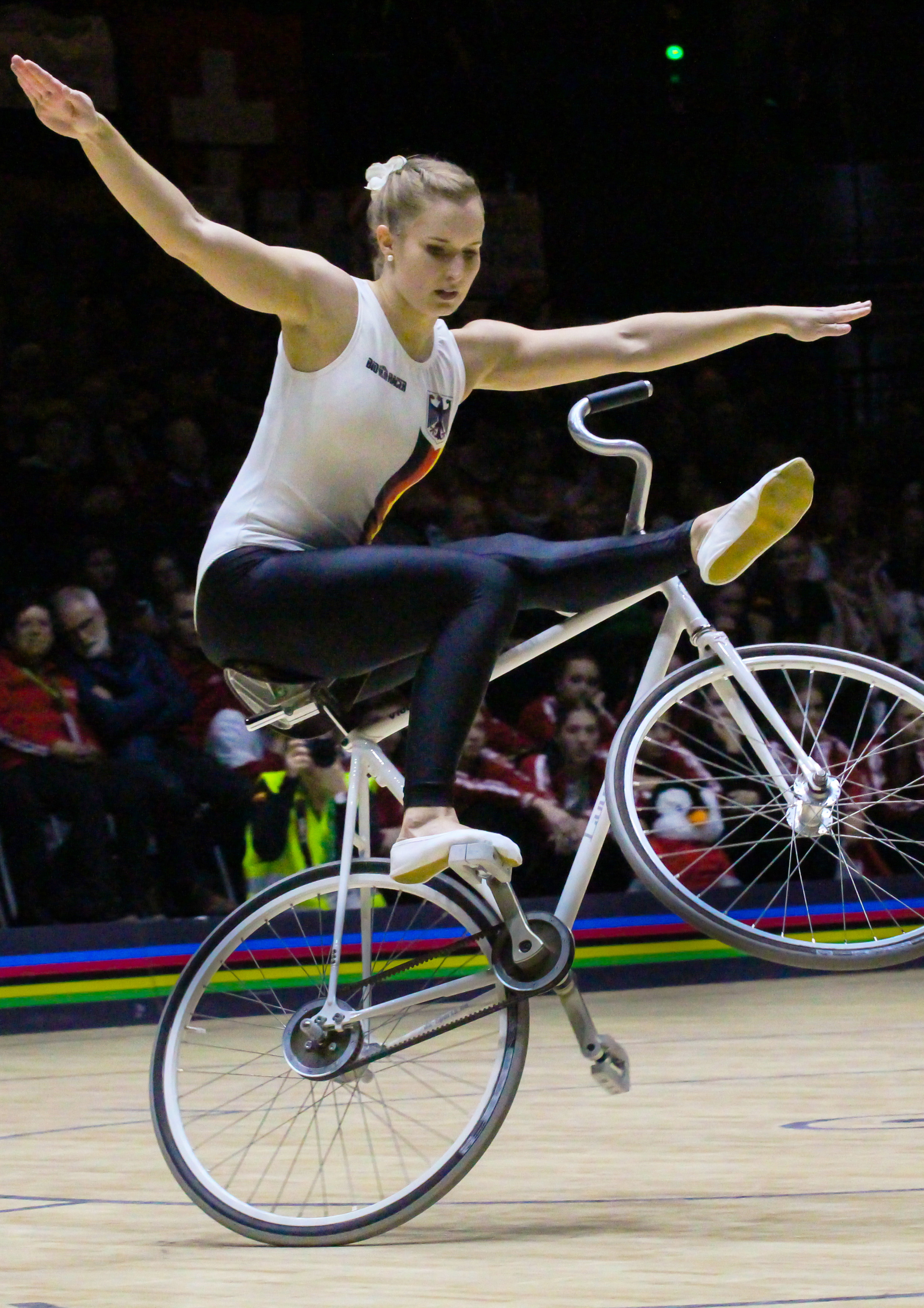
- Viola Brand
- Highest governing body: Union Cycliste Internationale
- First played: 19th century

Characteristics
- Contact: No
- Mixed-sex: No
- Type: Cycle sports
- Equipment: Specialized bicycle
- Venue: Indoor court

Presence
- Country or region: Europe, Asia
- Olympic: No
- World Games: 1989

Artistic cycling is a form of competitive indoor cycling in which athletes perform tricks (called exercises) for points on specialized, fixed-gear bikes in a format similar to ballet or gymnastics. The exercises are performed in front of judges in five-minute rounds by singles, pairs, four- or six-person teams.

== History ==
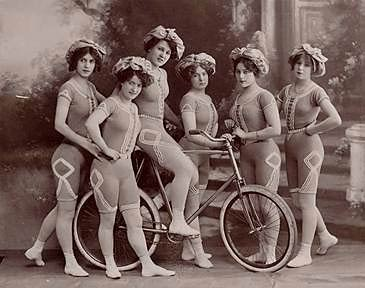
Kaufmann's Cycling Beauties

The first unofficial world championships in artistic cycling was held in 1888 by Swiss-American Nicholas Edward Kaufmann and was largely a publicity stunt to showcase his trick bicycling.

The first official world championships were held for men in 1956 and for women in 1970.

== Bikes ==
The bicycles used for artistic cycling are a form of fixed gear bicycle. The gearing of the chainring and sprocket are run at or near a one-to-one ratio, but the chainring may not have fewer teeth than the sprocket. The wheels must be of equal size and are closely spaced in order to make tricks, such as wheelies, easier to perform.

The handlebars are similar in form to a shallow drop handlebar found on a racing bicycle which has been turned upside down. Handlegrips or bar tape are applied to the top, horizontal portions of the bar. The handlebar, which can spin 360°, is mounted to a stem that has no horizontal extension, which puts the stem clamp in line with the steering axis and allows for the handlebars to remain in the same relative position no matter whether the front wheel is facing forward or backward.

The crank arm length may have a center to center distance of 130 to 170 mm.

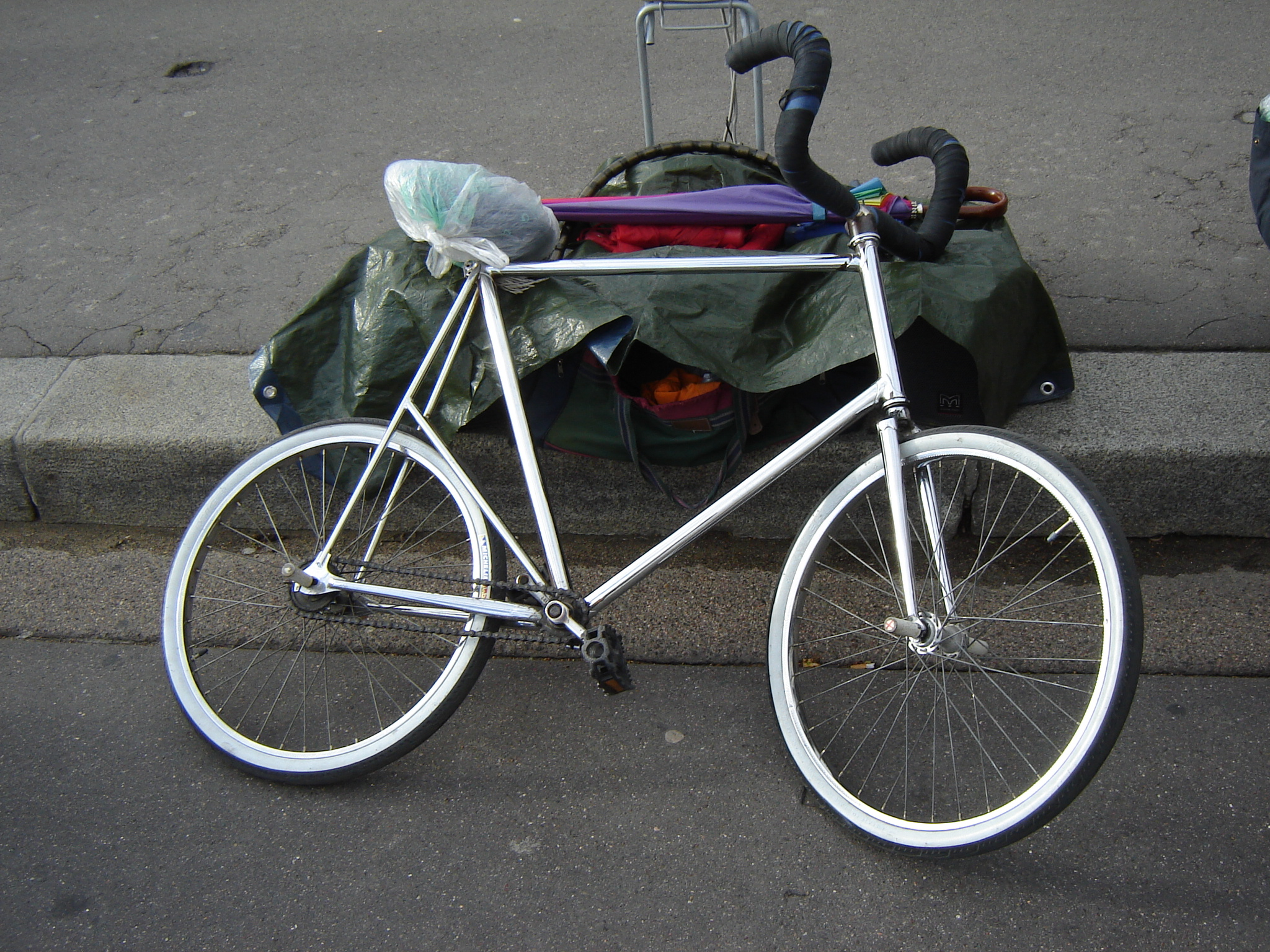
Specialised stunt bicycle

== Riding area ==
a) length = 12.0 to 14.0 meters b) width = 9.0 to 11.0 meters c) inner circle = 0.5 meters diameter d) middle circle = 4.0 meters diameter e) outer circle = 8.0 meters diameter f) stripes quartering = 0.5 meters g) clear area = 0.5 to 2 meters

The riding area for artistic cycling is a wooden court, which also serves cycle ball competitions, that ranges in dimensions from 9 × 12 meters to 11 × 14 meters, where the maximum size is mandated for international competitions.

Three concentric circles are taped or painted at the center of the court with diameters (measured to the outside edge of the line) of 0.5, 4, & 8 meters. Four half-meter hashes extend radially from the four quadrants of the middle circle.

A clear area of 0.5 to 2 meters must be free of all immovable objects around the perimeter of the court. Two meters is required for international competitions.

== Championships ==
- UCI Indoor Cycling World Championships
- Artistic cycling at the 2005 and 2007 Asian Indoor Games
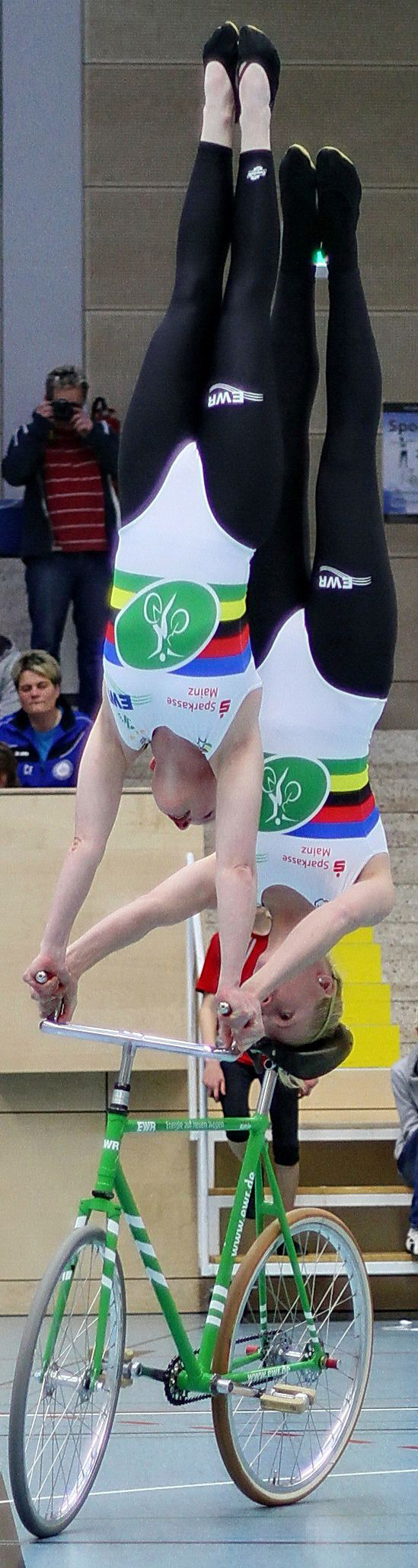
headstand / handstand

== Gallery ==
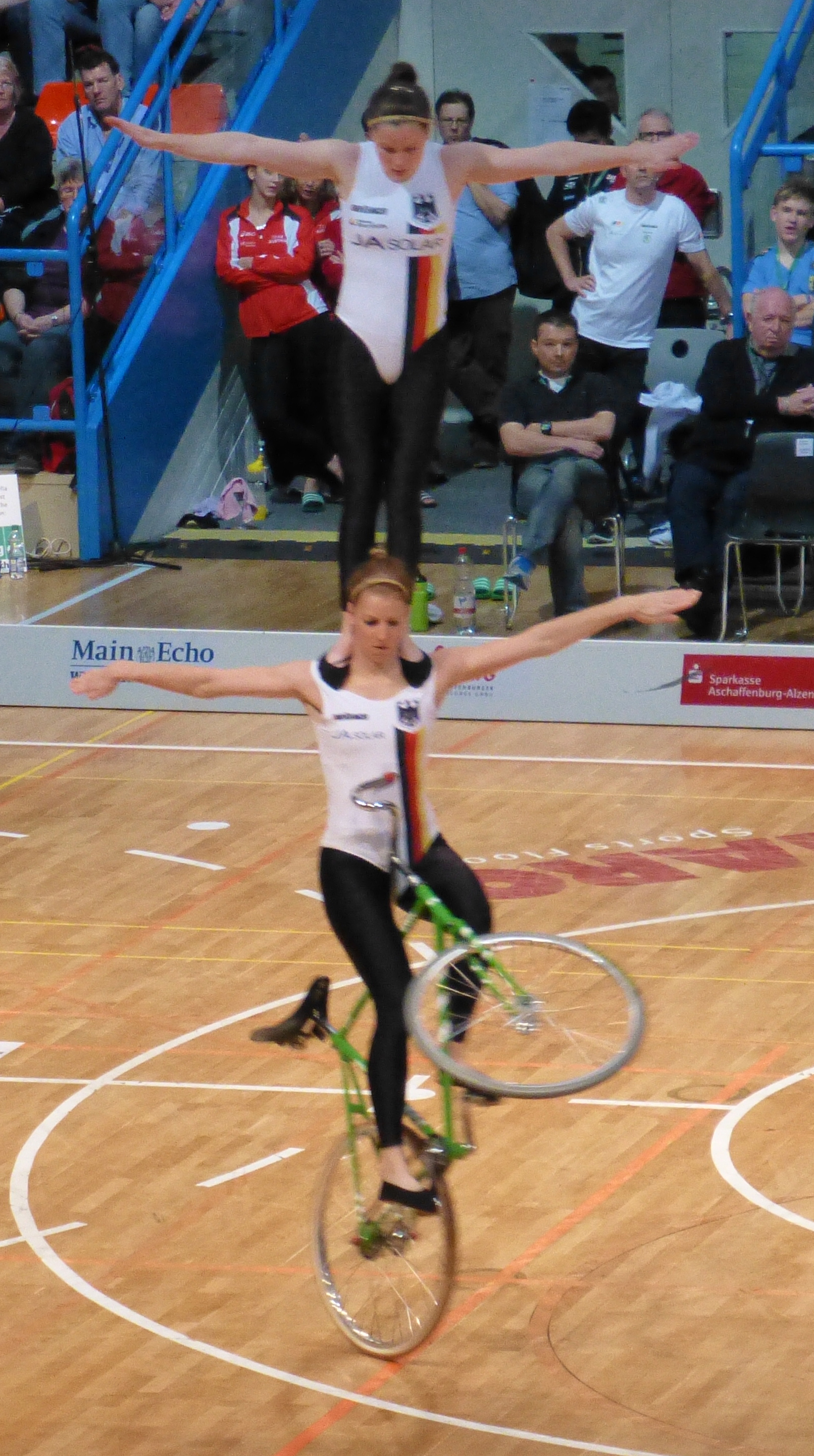
Katrin Schultheis and Sandra Sprinkmeier

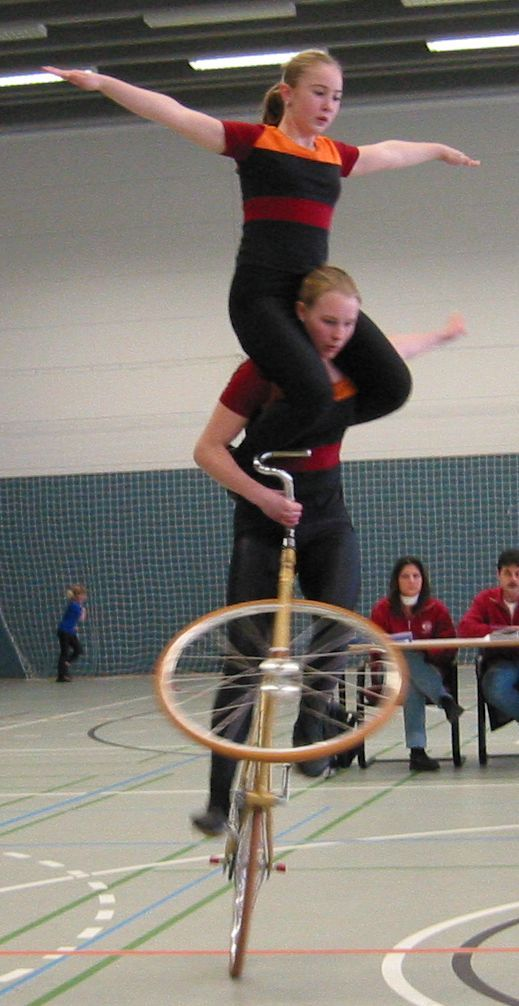
Pair artistic cycling

== See also ==
- Art bike
- Outline of cycling
- Glossary of cycling
- List of bicycle parts
- Freestyle fixed gear
- Indoor cycling at the World Games
