= Meko =

Meko or MEKO may refer to:

== People ==
- Michi Meko (born 1974), U.S. multidisciplinary artist
- Jim Meko, U.S. politician who stood for the 2010 San Francisco Board of Supervisors election
- Abu Yamen al-Meko, a leader of the Syrian militia force Raqqa Hawks Brigade
- Meko (Japanese: 妻子, lit. 'wife'; circa 7/8th-century), female Japanese Man'yōshū poet
- Meko the Pharoah, a member of the Wu-Tang Clan hiphop collective
- Taehong Kim (handle: MekO), e-sports gamer, member of the New York Excelsior and member of the Houston Outlaws
- Meko Kvirikashvili (born 1983), Georgian rugby union player
- Meko Winbush, film director, who directed 2023 film Gray Matter

== Places ==
- Meko, Ogun State, Nigeria
- Meko, Pamona Barat (West Pamona), Poso Regency, Central Sulawesi, Sulawesi Island, Indonesia

== Other uses ==
- Methylethyl ketone oxime (MEKO), C_{2}H_{5}C(NOH)CH_{3}
- MEKO (German: Mehrzweck-Kombination, lit. 'multi-purpose-combination'), a frigate design that is a family of warships developed by German shipyard Blohm+Voss

== See also ==
- MECO (disambiguation)
