= Casting at the 1981 World Games =

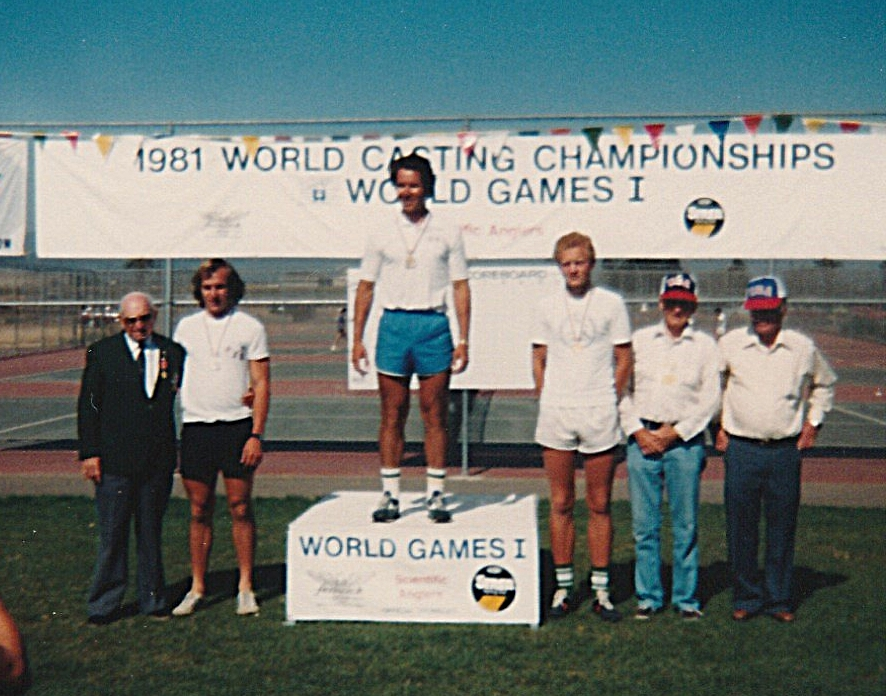
Casting - Multiplier Distance Single Handed gold, silver and bronze medalists, respectively – Steve Rajeff (USA), Chris Korich (USA) and Zack Willson (USA)

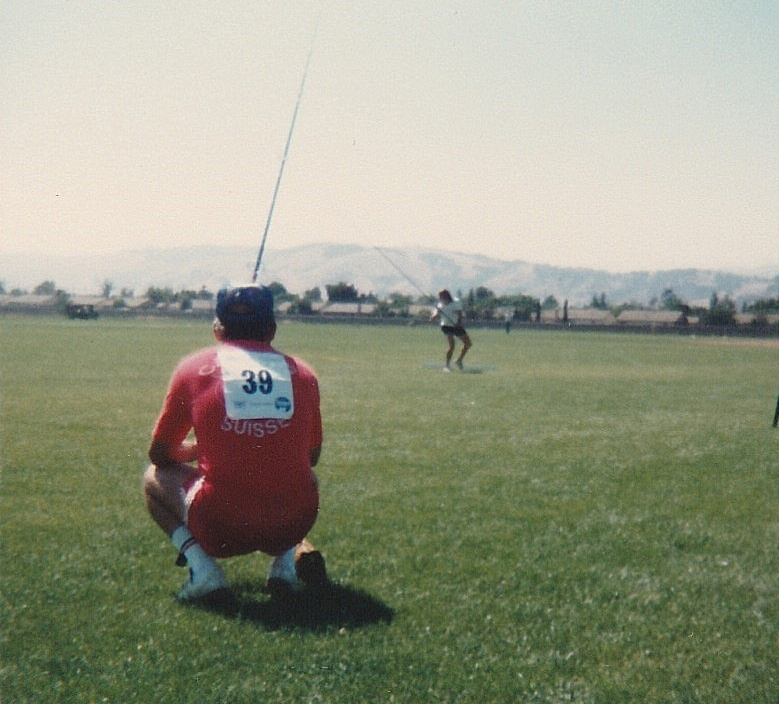
Casting competition at San Jose, California, during World Games I

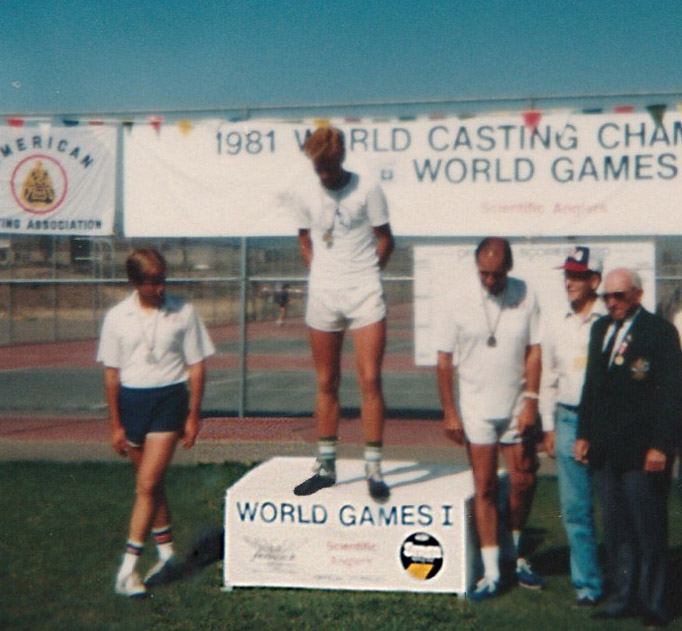
Casting - Multiplier Distance Double Handed gold, silver and bronze medalists, respectively: Chris Korich (USA), Art Walker (CAN) and Keith Pryor (USA)

The sport casting events of World Games I were held on July 29–August 2, 1981, at Gunderson High School in San Jose, California, in the United States. These were the first World Games, an international quadrennial multi-sport event, and were hosted by the city of Santa Clara. The World Casting Championships were held simultaneously and included women, juniors and pros. The only World Games casting events were these 11 men’s contests. Casters from the United States won 18 of the 33 medals awarded, with Steve Rajeff collecting four gold medals.

Casting is the act of using a fishing rod and reel and accurately throwing the lure in a specific spot.

== Medalists ==
Event	Gold	Silver	Bronze
Men
Fly skish accuracy	Harald Mæhle (NOR)	Chris Korich (USA)	Erwin Meindl (AUT)
Spinning accuracy Arenburg target	Guido Vinck (BEL)	Harald Mæhle (NOR)	Steve Rajeff (USA)
Spinning accuracy skish	Øyvind Førland (NOR)	Tom Martens (NED)	Helmut Hochwartner (AUT)
Fly distance single handed	Steve Rajeff (USA)	Martin Hayes (AUS)	Øyvind Førland (NOR)
Fly distance double handed	Steve Rajeff (USA)	Chris Korich (USA)	Øyvind Førland (NOR)
Spinning distance single handed	Ernst Rohatsch (AUT)	Markus Kläusler (SUI)	Steve Rajeff (USA)
Spinning distance double handed	Chris Korich (USA)	Helmut Hochwartner (AUT)	Kevin Carriero (USA)
Multiplier accuracy	Øyvind Førland (NOR)	Chris Korich (USA)	Zack Wilson (USA)
Multiplier distance single handed	Steve Rajeff (USA)	Chris Korich (USA)	Zack Wilson (USA)
Multiplier distance double handed	Chris Korich (USA)	Bruce Walker (CAN)	Keith Pryor (USA)
All-round	Steve Rajeff (USA)	Tim Rajeff (USA)	Øyvind Førland (NOR)

== Details ==
=== Fly skish accuracy ===
(first 11 places decided in a cast-off)

1. Harold Maehle, Norway, 100 points

2. Chris Korich, USA, 100

3. Harald Meindl, Austria, 100

4. John Waters, Australia, 100

5. Guido Vinck, Belgium, 100

6. Ron Reeves, Australia, 100

7. Raphael Lasseet, Belgium, 100

8. Bjorn Rogler, Norway, 100

9. Stefan Mantier, Austria, 100

10. James Tomlinson, Scotland, 100

11. Oyvind Forland, Norway, 100

=== Spinning accuracy Arenburg target ===
(ties broken in castoff)

1. Guid Vinck, Belgium, 100 points

2. Harold Maehle, Norway, 98

3. Steve Rajeff, USA, 98

4. Felix Roth, Switzerland, 98

5. Ron Reeves, Australia, 98

6. B.L. Farley, USA, 96

followed by at least 25 others

=== Spinning accuracy skish ===
(ties broken in castoff)

1. Oyvind Forland, Norway, 100

2. Tom Martens, Netherlands, 100

3. Helmut Hochwartner, Austria, 100

4. Felix Roth, Switzerland, 100

5. Harold Maehle, Norway, 100

6. Tim Rajeff, USA, 95

followed by at least 24 others

=== Fly distance single handed ===
1. Steve Rajeff, USA, 67.12 m

2. Peter Hayes, Australia, 64.43 m

3. Oyvind Forland, Norway, 63.39 m

=== Fly distance double handed ===
1. Steve Rajeff, USA, 79.94 m

2. Chris Korich, USA, 79.04 m

3. Oyvind Forland, Norway, 76.34 m

=== Spinning distance single handed ===
1. Ernst Rohatsch, Austria, 73.33m, 109.99 points

2. Peter Klausier, Switzerland, 71.94m, 107.91

3. Steve Rajeff, USA, 71.23m, 106.84

=== Spinning distance double handed ===
1. Chris Korich, USA, 122.06, 183.09 points

2. Helmut Hochwartner, Austria, 118.56, 178.84

3. Kevin Carriero, USA, 116.87, 175.30

=== Multiplier accuracy ===
1. Øyvind Førland, NOR

2. Chris Korich, USA

3. Zack Wilson, USA

=== Multiplier distance single handed ===
1. Steve Rajeff, USA

2. Chris Korich, USA

3. Zack Wilson, USA

=== Multiplier distance double handed ===
1. Steve Rajeff, USA

2. Art Walker, Canada

3. Keith Pryor, USA

=== All-round ===
1. Steve Rajeff, USA

2. Chris Korich, USA

3. Tim Rajeff, USA
