= Mauro Di Pasquale =

Canadian powerlifter

- Born: Mauro Di Pasquale; 1945 (age 80–81); Italy
- Other name: "The Anabolic Doc"
- Occupations: Doctor, powerlifter, author, Ship Captain
- Height: 5 ft 8 in (1.73 m)
- Title: IPF World Powerlifting Champion

Competition record

Powerlifting

Representing Canada

World Games
Gold medal – first place	1981 Santa Clara	75kg

IPF World Powerlifting Championships
7th	1974	67.5 kg
1st	1976	67.5 kg
2nd	1978	67.5 kg
2nd	1979	75kg
2nd	1980	75kg
6th	1984	75kg

Canadian National Championships
1st	1974	67.5 kg
1st	1976	67.5 kg
1st	1978	67.5 kg
1st	1979	75kg
1st	1980	75kg
1st	1982	75kg
1st	1983	75kg
1st	1984	75kg

Mauro G. Di Pasquale (born 1945) is an Italian-born Canadian powerlifter, bodybuilding author, columnist and low-carbohydrate diet advocate. He is an IPF world champion, World Games champion, and an eight-time Canadian champion in powerlifting.

== Biography ==
Di Pasquale was an assistant professor at the University of Toronto from 1988 to 1998. He lectured and researched on athletic performance, nutritional supplements, and drug use in sports. He holds an honors degree in biological science, majoring in molecular biochemistry and genetics (1968), and a medical degree (1971) – both from the University of Toronto. Di Pasquale is certified as a Medical Review Officer (MRO) by the Medical Review Officer Certification Council (MROCC). He was the MRO for the National Association for Stock Car Auto Racing (NASCAR). From 1997 to 1999 Di Pasquale was involved in writing, research, and product development for Experimental and Applied Sciences (EAS).

As a bodybuilding author, Di Pasquale has written thousands of articles for many large bodybuilding and fitness magazines such as Muscle & Fitness and Iron Man; His articles and books have been translated into Italian language and published in Italy by Sandro Ciccarelli Olympian's News magazine. He has also written several books on bodybuilding related topics such as bodybuilding nutrition and performance-enhancing drugs.

Impressed by the way Di Pasquale would monitor steroid use in the bodybuilding industry, World Wrestling Federation (WWF, now WWE) owner Vince McMahon hired him in June 1992 to monitor the company's new drug testing program; at this time, McMahon was facing criminal charges for allegedly supplying steroids to some of his wrestlers in a manner that violated federal law and was hoping to regain public confidence. While working with the WWF, Di Pasquale took a hardline approach and ensured that anyone who failed a drug test would leave the company; such an example showed when WWF wrestler Ultimate Warrior failed a drug test in September 1992. His firm policy towards steroid use earned him the nickname "Mr. Steroid Hunter."

== Diet ==
Di Pasquale is an advocate of low-carbohydrate dieting. He has authored The Anabolic Diet (1995) which advocates a cyclic ketogenic diet (CKD). His diet was also called "The Pork Chop Diet".

== Powerlifting ==
Di Pasquale won the IPF World Powerlifting Championships in 1976, as well as the IPF World Games in 1981. He is also an eight-time Canadian champion, two-time Pan American and one-time North American champion. He is also the first Canadian powerlifter to become a World Champion and first Canadian powerlifter to total ten times their own bodyweight in any weight class. Di Pasquale is the only Canadian to ever total ten times their own bodyweight in two weight classes.

== Selected publications ==
- Drug Use and Detection in Amateur Sports (1984)
- The Anabolic Diet (1995)
- Amino Acids and Proteins for the Athlete: The Anabolic Edge (1997)
- The Metabolic Diet: The Revolutionary Diet that Explodes the Myths About Carbohydrates and Fats (2000)
