= Frederick Hatfield =

American powerlifter

- Born: October 21, 1942
- Died: May 14, 2017 (aged 74)
- Other name: "Dr. Squat"
- Occupations: Powerlifter, Teacher
- Height: 5 ft 6 in (1.68 m)

Competition record

Powerlifting

Representing United States

World Games
Silver medal – second place	1981 Santa Clara	100 kg

IPF World Powerlifting Championships
1st	1983	100 kg
1st	1986	110 kg

USPF National Championships
2nd	1981	100 kg
2nd	1983	100 kg
3rd	1984	100 kg
2nd	1985	110 kg
2nd	1986	110 kg

AAU National Championships
3rd	1977	82.5 kg

Frederick C. Hatfield (October 21, 1942 – May 14, 2017), nicknamed Dr. Squat, was an American world champion powerlifter and PhD holder in sports sciences. He was also the co-founder and president of the International Sports Sciences Association, an organization of fitness experts which certifies personal fitness trainers from around the world. He went on to make the ICOPRO bodybuilding protein and supplements for Vince McMahon's World Bodybuilding Federation. After the promotion folded, McMahon continued to market the product until 1995.

== Personal life and career ==
Hatfield was born in Williamstown, Massachusetts, in 1942. He graduated from Cromwell High School. He served in the United States Marine Corps where he worked with the Office of Naval Intelligence in the Philippines until 1964, when he enrolled in Southern Connecticut State University.

Upon graduating, Hatfield earned his Bachelor of Science degree in health, physical education and recreation. He then attended the University of Illinois at Urbana-Champaign, where he earned his Master's degree in the social sciences of sport. He went on to earn his PhD in psychology, sociology and motor learning from Temple University in Philadelphia.

Hatfield held positions at Newark State College, Bowie State University, and the University of Wisconsin–Madison. He taught undergraduate students, and conducted research in sport psychology. He has written over 60 books, some of them best-sellers. His best-selling seminal work Bodybuilding:A Scientific Approach set the standard for many fitness books today. He wrote hundreds of academic and fitness articles which have been cited by experts, including Anabolic Steroids expert James Wright.

He trained hundreds of professional athletes including Mr. Olympia winner Lee Haney, Evander Holyfield, and Lyle Alzado.

He was diagnosed with metastatic skeletal cancer in 2012 and was advised by 3 doctors that he had 3 months to live. However, he told CBN News that he had tried to slow progression with a ketogenic diet and the cancer went away completely.

He was inducted in the National Fitness Hall of Fame in 2016.

Hatfield died May 14, 2017 from sudden heart failure at age 74.

== Accomplishments in powerlifting ==
As a powerlifter, Hatfield won 2 IPF World Powerlifting Championships titles in 1983 and 1986. At the age of 45, he set a squat world record by lifting 1,014 pounds (460 kg) in the 125 kg (276 lb) weight class, which at the time was the heaviest squat in history regardless of bodyweight. He weighed 255 lbs.

Personal Records
Squat	1014 pounds
Bench	523 pounds
Deadlift	766 pounds
Snatch	275 pounds
Clean and Jerk	369 pounds
