= Track speed skating at the 1981 World Games =

The track speed skating events of World Games I were held on July 29–31, 1981, in Parking Lot J of Marriott’s Great America amusement park in Santa Clara, California, in the United States. These were the first World Games, an international quadrennial multi-sport event, and were hosted by the city of Santa Clara. The course was a 400-meter triangle-shaped track. Italian athletes won 11 of the 18 track speed skating medals.

== Medalists ==
Event	Gold	Silver	Bronze
Men
5000m	Tom Peterson (USA)	Giuseppe Cruciani (ITA)	Hermes Fossi (ITA)
10,000m	Tom Peterson (USA)	Hermes Fossi (ITA)	Moreno Bagnolini (ITA)
20,000m	Scott Constantine (NZL)	Giuseppe Cruciani (ITA)	Moreno Bagnolini (ITA)
Women
5000m	Monica Lucchese (ITA)	Paola Sometti (ITA)	Annie Lambrechts (BEL)
10,000m	Paola Cristofori (ITA)	Darlene Kessenger (USA)	Annie Lambrechts (BEL)
15,000m	Annie Lambrechts (BEL)	Paola Christofori (ITA)	Monica Lucchese (ITA)

== Details ==
=== Men ===
==== 5000 m ====
1. Tom Peterson, USA, 10:29.58.
2. Giuseppe Cruciani, Italy, 10:29.73.
3. Hermes Fossi, Italy, 10:30.42.
4. Dimitri Van Cauwemberge, Belgium, 10:31.11.
5. Chuck Jackson, USA, 10:31.20.
6. Danny Van De Perre, Belgium, 10:31.22.
7. Robb Dunn, USA, 10:32.10.
8. Scott Constantine, New Zealand, 10:32.24.
9. Augustin Ramirez, Colombia, 10:32.37.
10. Dean Huffman, USA, 10:33.31.
11. Alvaro Arrendondo, Colombia, 10:34.06.
12. Humberto Triana, Colombia, 10:34.34.
13. Serge Plante, Canada, 10:38.04.
14. Roland De Roo, Belgium, 10:41.69.
15. Moreno Bagnolini, Italy, 10:51.69.
16. Doug Blair, Canada, 10:56.24.

==== 10,000 m ====
1. Tom Peterson, USA, 20:19.19
2. Hermes Fossi, Italy, 20:19.35
3. Moreno Bagnolini, Italy, 20:19.41
4. Danny Van de Perre, Belgium, 20:19.41
5. Chuck Jackson, USA, 20:19.67
6. Robb Dunn, USA, 20:19.81
7. Scott Constantine, New Zealand, 20:19.87
8. Humberto Triana, Colombia, 20:20.01
9. Dean Huffman, USA 20:20.09
10. Augustin Ramirez, Colombia, 20:20.64
11. Alvaro Arrendondo, Colombia, 20:20.70
12. Dimitri Van Cauwenberghe, Belgium, 20:20.75
13. Serge Plante, Canada, 20:20.97
14. Roland De Rod, Belgium, 20:21.00
15. Giuseppe Cruciani, Italy, 20:27.09
16. Doug Blair, Canada, 20:49.68

==== 20,000 m ====
1. Scott Constantine, New Zealand, 40:03.43.
2. Giuseppe Cruciani, Italy, 40:38.02.
3. Moreno Bagnolini, Italy, 40:38.06.
4. Danny Van De Perre, Belgium, 40:38.08.
5. Tom Peterson, USA, disqualified from 3rd, no time credited
6. Hermes Fossi, Italy, 40:39.02.
7. Augustin Ramirez, Colombia, 40:39.04.
8. (tie) Robb Dunn, USA; Dimitri Van Cauwenberghe, Belgium; Serge Plante, Canada, 40:39.08.
11. Chuck Jackson, USA, 40:40.04.
12. Humberto Triana, Colombia, 40:40.06.
13. Doug Blair, Canada, 40:42.08.

=== Women ===
==== 5000 m ====
1. Monica Lucchese, Italy, 10:18.90.
2. Paola Sometti, Italy, 10:19.01.
3. Annie Lambrechts, Belgium, 10:19.53.
4. Mary Barriere, USA, 10:19.80.
5. Paola Christofori, Italy, 10:20.49.
6. Sue Dooley, USA, 10:24.79.
7. Fiona Wass, New Zealand, 10:25.53.
8. Darlene Kessinger, USA, 10:31.03.
9. Christine DeClerk, Belgium, 10:34.59.

==== 10,000 m ====
1. Paola Cristofori, Italy, 21:45.13
2. Darlene Kessinger, USA, 21:45.25
3. Anne Lambrechts, Belgium, 21:45.84
4. Mary Barriere, USA, 21:46.14
5. Paola Sometti, Italy, 21:46.17
6. Monica Lucchese, Italy, 21:46.45
7. Luigia Foini, Italy, 21:46.60
8. Fiona Wass, New Zealand, 21:47.36
9. Sue Dooley, USA, 21:47.68
10. Christine DeClerck, Belgium, 21:48.00
11. Marie Van Damme, Belgium, DNF

==== 15,000 m ====
1. Annie Lambrechte, Belgium, 33:45.04. (time as published in source)
2. Paola Christofori, Italy, 33:45.03.
3. Monica Lucchese, Italy, 33:45.03.
4. Darlene Kessinger, USA, 33:45.04.
5. Paola Sometti, Italy, 33:46.02.

No times –

6. Mary Barriere, USA
7. Fiona Wass, New Zealand.
8. Luigia Fioni, Italy.
9. Sue Dooley, USA
10. Christine de Clerck, Belgium.
11. Marie-Claire Van Damme, Belgium.
