= Road speed skating at the 1981 World Games =

The road speed skating events of World Games I were held on August 1, 1981, in the vicinity of Marriott’s Great America amusement park in Santa Clara, California, in the United States. These were the first World Games, an international quadrennial multi-sport event, and were hosted by the city of Santa Clara. This was the first time that the marathon and half-marathon road events were conducted in international competition. Both events were held on the city streets of Santa Clara. Tom Peterson of the United States set an American record in winning the marathon.

== Medalists ==
Event	Gold	Silver	Bronze
Men
Marathon	Tom Peterson (USA)	Ermes Fossi (ITA)	Danny Van De Perre (BEL)
Women
Half-marathon	Annie Lambrechts (BEL)	Mary Barriere (USA)	Sue Dooley (USA)

== Details ==
=== Men’s marathon (42 km) ===
1. Tom Peterson, USA, 1:26:00.67

2. Ermes Fossi, Italy

3. Danny Van De Perre, Belgium

4. Moreno Bagnolini, Italy

5. Dean Huffman, USA

6. Chuck Jackson, USA

7. Augustin Ramirez, Colombia

8. Serge Plante, Canada

9. Scott Constantine, New Zealand

10. Robb Dunn, USA

11. Roland De Roo, Belgium

12. Humberto Triana, Colombia

13. Dimitri Van Cauwenberghe, Belgium

14. Alvaro Arrendondo, Colombia

15. Doug Blair, Canada

16. Giuseppe Cruciani, Italy

=== Women’s half-marathon (21 km) ===
1. Anne Lambrechts, Belgium, 50:27.33

2. Mary Barriere, USA

3. Sue Dooley, USA

4. Luigia Foini, Italy

5. Darlene Kessinger, USA

6. Christine DeClerck, Belgium

7. Monica Lucchese, Italy

8. Marie Van Damme, Belgium

9. Fiona Wass, New Zealand

10. Paola Cristofori, Italy

11. Paola Sometti, Italy
