= MECO =

Meco, Mecos, or MECO may refer to:

== People ==
=== Given name ===
- Meço Bono (18th century), member of the Supreme Council of the Armed Forces for the Pashalik of Yanina, under Ali Pasha of Ioannina
- Meco Eno (born 1966), American musician
- Meco Poliziani, Canadian player of Canadian football, drafted into the Canadian Football League in 1960

=== Surname ===
- Alejandra Meco (born 1990), Spanish actress and dancer
- Éric Di Meco (born 1963), French footballer
- Jose Luis Abalos Meco (born 1958), Spanish politician
- Richard Meco (1590–1661), English musician
- Sonila Meço (born 1977), Albanian journalist, television presenter and lecturer
- Sylvia Meco, a competitor for Italy in artistic roller skating at the 1981 World Games
- Vincenzo Meco (born 1940), Italian racing cyclist

=== Nickname, stage name or pseudonym ===
- Meco, American record producer and musician Domenico Monardo (1939–2023)
- The Great Meco, a wrestler signed to Revolutionary Championship Wrestling
- Carmelo "Meco" Domínguez, a Bolivian drug lord involved in Presidential corruption in Bolivia
- Américo "Meco" dos Santos, an Angolan footballer for Atlético Petróleos de Luanda

=== Other people ===
- A meco, a member of the Mecos, a Casta, a caste of Amerindians in Iberian colonial empires

== Places ==
- Meco (municipality), a part of metropolitan Madrid, Spain
  - Meco rail station, on the C-8 (Cercanías Madrid) rail line
- Meco, New York, United States, a hamlet
- El Meco, an ancient Maya port, now an archaeological site
- Meco Mountain, Angola - see Portuguese Angola
- Meco, a river in Chile - see List of rivers of Chile (D–O)
- El Meco, a tributary of the Moctezuma River in Acatlán, Hidalgo, Mexico

== Businesses ==
- Mactan Electric Company, a Filipino electrical utility
- Maui Electric Company, an American electrical utility
- MECO Construction, a Costa Rican company - see Johnny Araya Monge

== Sports ==
- Mecos București, a defunct Romanian football club
- Meco Cup, a women's ice hockey tournament
- Meco, a racehorse that won the 1874 Juvenile Stakes (United States)

== Other uses ==
- Magnetospheric eternally collapsing object, a theoretical alternative to a black hole
- Magnolia Electric Co. (MECo), an American band, the backing band to Jason Molina
- Main engine cutoff, the shut-off of the first stage in a multistage rocket
- Middle East Christian Outreach, which merged with SIM (Christian organization) in 2016
- Middle Eocene Climatic Optimum, a global warming period 40 million years ago, during the Eocene
- Middle European Cooperation in Statistical Physics, an international conference on statistical physics
- Manila Economic and Cultural Office, Taipei, Taiwan; the representative office and de facto embassy of the Philippines to Taiwan

== See also ==
- Meko (disambiguation)
