= International Sports Sciences Association =

Fitness education and certification company

- Founded: 1988; 38 years ago
- Founder: Sal Arria; Frederick Hatfield
- Type: For-profit
- Headquarters: Phoenix, Arizona
- Location: Phoenix, Arizona
- Method: Certifications, technical assistance, trainings and seminars
- Website: www.issaonline.com

The International Sports Sciences Association (ISSA) is an organization that operates as an education and certification company for fitness trainers, personal trainers, strength and conditioning coaches, nutritionists, nutrition coaches, and aerobic instructors.

Instruction is based on exercise assessment, nutritional planning, fitness instruction, sports medicine practice, and post-rehabilitation training. The school has enrolled over 300,000 students in its fitness education and continuing education courses.

== History ==
The International Sports Sciences Association was founded in 1988, when, "recognizing the need for standardization and credibility, Dr. Sal Arria and Dr. Frederick Hatfield created a personal fitness training program to merge gym experience with practical and applied sciences." The ISSA became a Provisional Affiliate of the National Board of Fitness Examiners in 2004.

In 2009, the ISSA became the first fitness organization to earn accreditation by a federally recognized accrediting agency—the Distance Education and Training Council (an accrediting agency recognized by the United States Department of Education and the Council for Higher Education Accreditation).

In 2019, Andrew Wyant joined ISSA as its president and CEO. In 2021, ISSA was acquired by Tailwind Capital.

== Divisions ==
- Public Division: no restrictions, open to current students, current members, and the general public.
  - Primary function: to encourage enrollment in ISSA education programs...[and] provide information via articles and links on health and fitness.
- Education Division: access restricted to students enrolled in ISSA education courses, and ISSA certified members in good standing.
  - Primary function: to provide specialized education in health and fitness.
- Professional Division: Exam access for ISSA students qualified to sit for final exam, full access for ISSA certified members in good standing.
  - Primary function: To administer final exams, issue certifications, [and] oversee maintenance of professional status.

== Accreditation and affiliations ==
The ISSA is also a Provisional Affiliate of the National Board of Fitness Examiners (NBFE).
