= San José Unified School District =

School district in California, United States

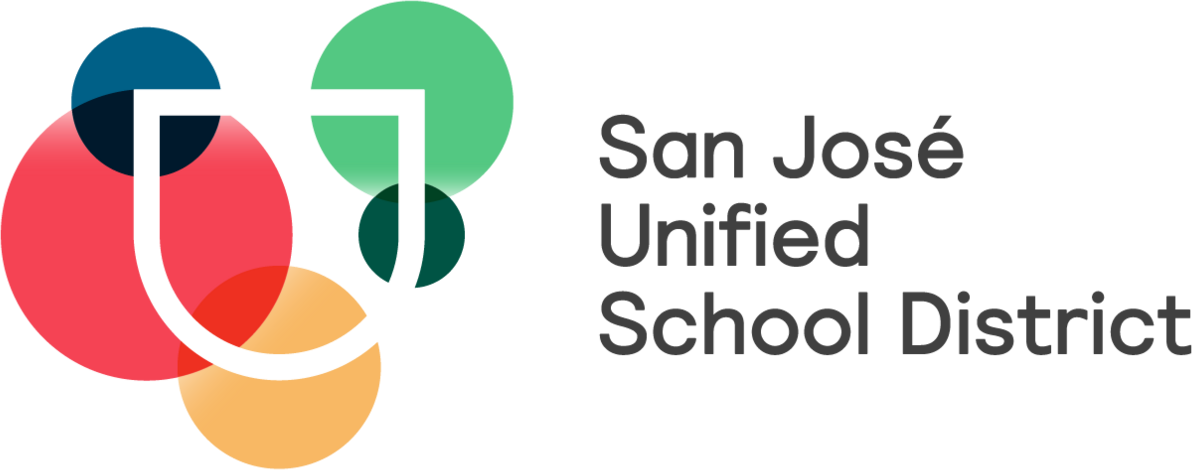

Location
- San Jose, California Santa Clara County United States
- Coordinates: 37°20′10″N 121°54′41″W

District information
- Type: Unified school district
- Grades: TK–12
- Established: 1853
- Superintendent: Nancy Albarrán
- Schools: 41
- NCES District ID: 0634590

Students and staff
- Students: 31,713
- Teachers: 1,412.15 FTE
- Staff: Over 3,000

Other information
- Website: www.sjusd.org

San José Unified School District (abbreviated SJUSD) is a TK-12 unified school district in Santa Clara County, California, that covers a large portion of the city of San Jose. The district has more than 3,000 full-time employees serving approximately 30,000 students in 41 schools from Downtown San Jose in the north to the Almaden Valley in the south. It is one of 19 school districts that serve parts of San Jose, the largest school district in the Santa Clara Valley, and the 24th largest in California.

== History ==
San José Unified School District was established in 1853 as the San Jose City School District. The district adopted its present name in 1936.

In 1863, the district opened San Jose High School, the second-oldest public high school in California. In 1953, the district took over operation of San Jose City College from San Jose State College.

State law originally required school districts to be coterminous with city limits. San Jose's rapid expansion under city manager Dutch Hamann caused territory to be transferred to the San José Unified School District from the surrounding rural school districts. The rural districts used lawsuits to delay or block annexations in an attempt to preserve their tax bases. In 1954, the state passed a law allowing school districts to have distinct boundaries from cities, mostly confining San José Unified School District to its boundaries at the time. Christensen (2015) cites the resulting hodgepodge of school districts within San Jose as a contributing factor in the city's "fragmented politics, lack of identity and racial segregation". The law also required certain elementary districts to either build their own high school or be annexed by a district that already had a high school. Thus, in 1956, the voters in Almaden Union School District elected to merge with San José Unified.

In 1971, parents in San Jose filed suit against the school district to force school integration. The district claimed that any racial segregation was due to housing patterns, not explicit policy. However, in 1984, the United States District Court for the Northern District of California issued a desegregation order for the school district, embarrassing local officials. The district responded by opening magnet schools and busing students.

In 1983, federal bankruptcy judge Seymour Abrahams declared the school board bankrupt under Chapter 9. The judge rolled back employee wages.

In the late 1990s, a fire sprinkler broke in the basement of the district office, destroying many of the district's historic documents. District staff and local historians have been working ever since to rebuild the district archive.

By 2017, a high cost of living and housing shortage had contributed to the district's declining enrollment.

Over 164 years, San José Unified has supported 53 elementary schools, of which 26 remain active as of the 2017–2018 school year. Additionally, the district supports six comprehensive middle schools, six comprehensive high schools, a continuation high school, and an alternative education school.

In Q3 2025, district officials made plans to close 8 or 9 elementary schools, with a possible 9-school closure including one relocation at the end of the school year. This incentive was discussed at the school board on February 10, 2026.

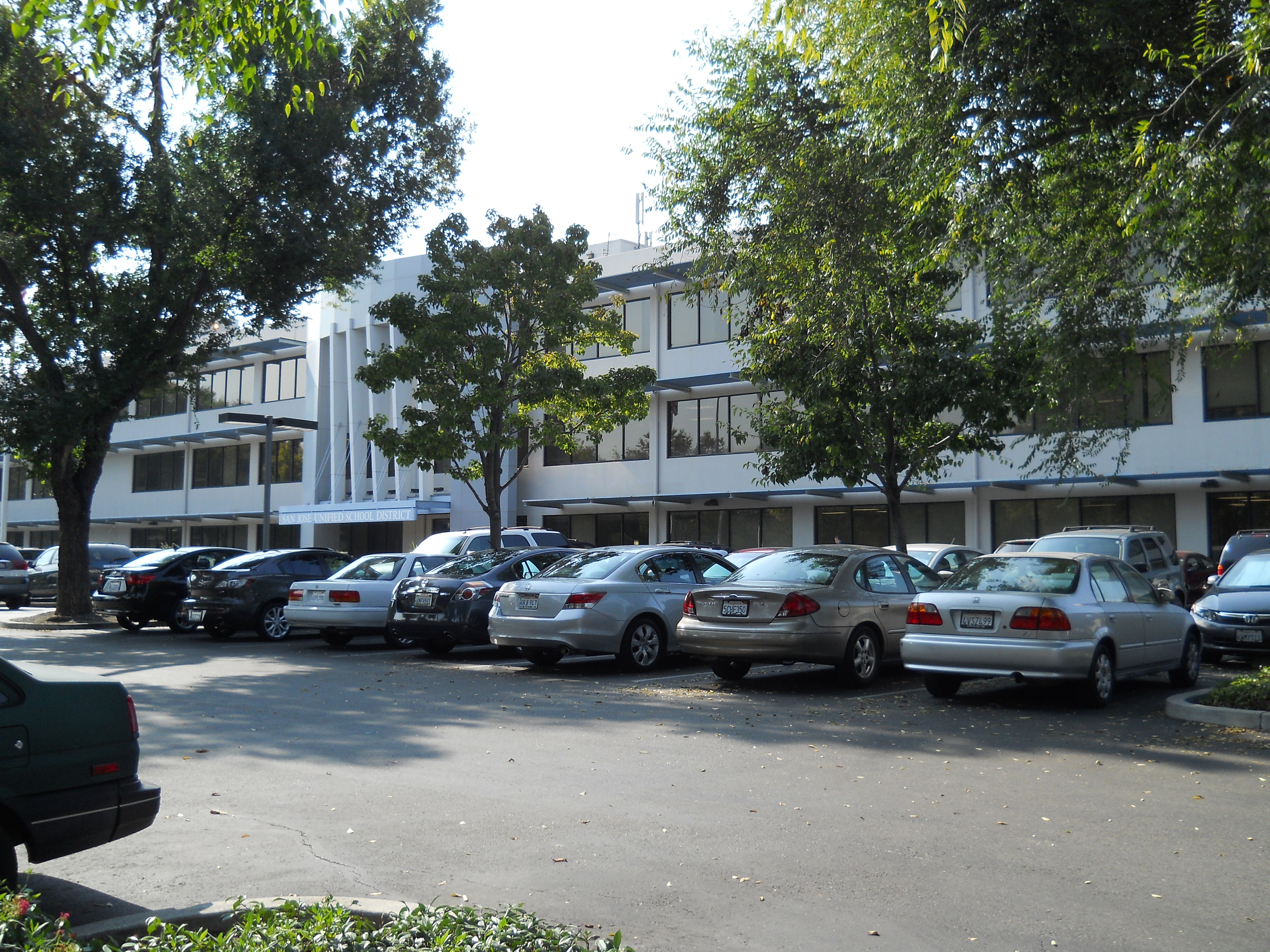
San José Unified School District administration building, 855 Lenzen Avenue

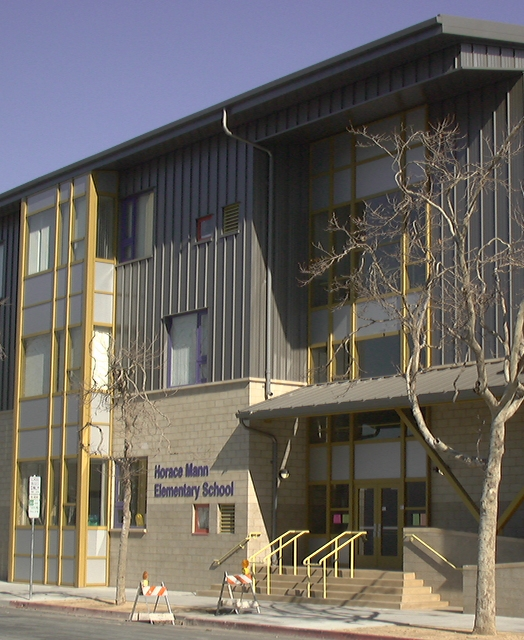
Horace Mann Elementary School in downtown San Jose

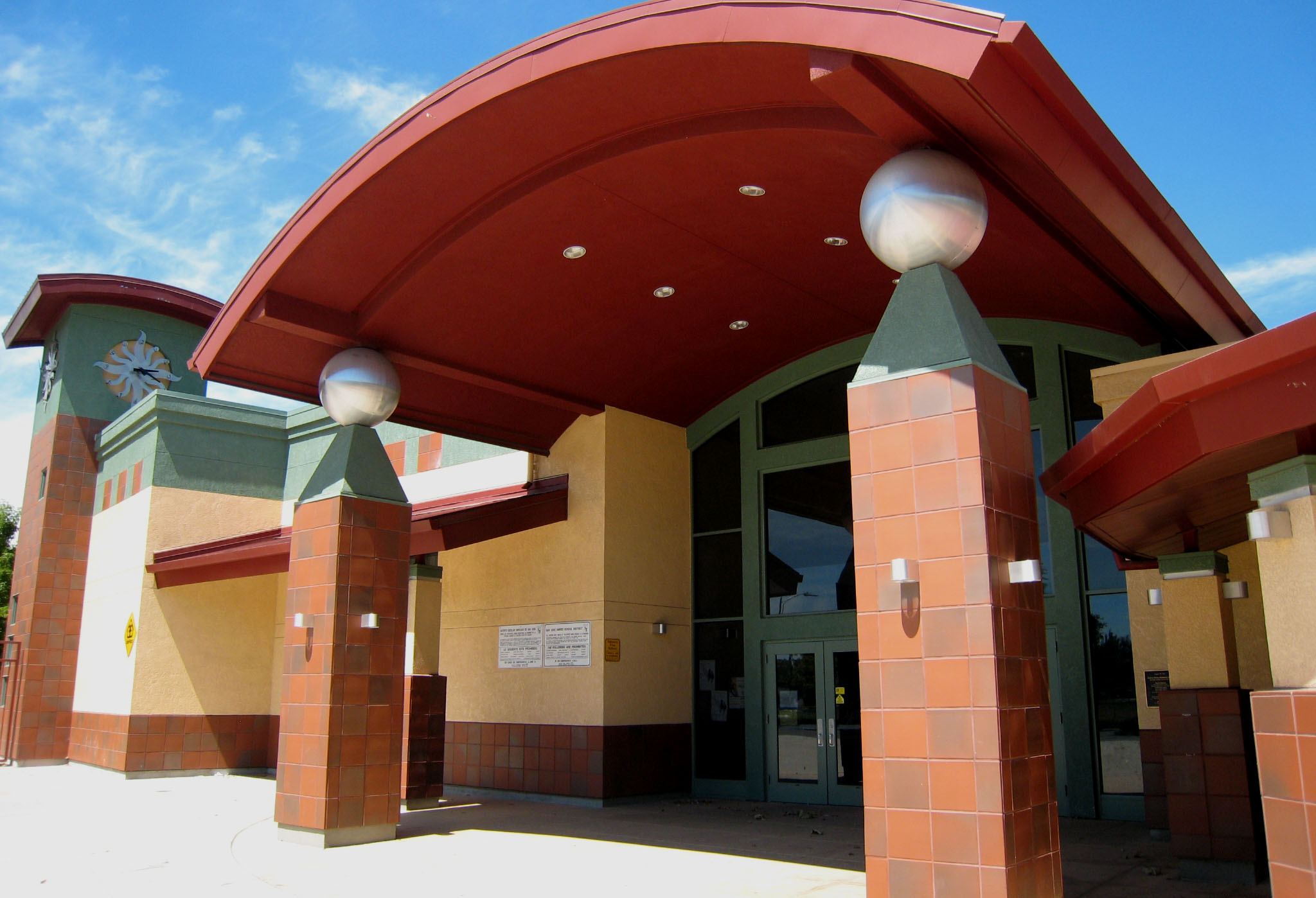
Hammer Montessori Magnet School

== List of schools ==
School name	Neighborhood	Students	FTE Teachers	Pupil/Teacher Ratio
Allen at Steinbeck (K-8)		807	47	17.2
Almaden Elementary School		415	25	16.6
Bachrodt Elementary School		644	39	16.5
Booksin Elementary School		794	36	22.1
Broadway High School		251	18	13.9
Canoas Elementary School		429	27	17
Rachel Carson Elementary School		422	21	20.1
Castillero Middle School		1247	61	20.4
Anne Darling Elementary School		473	34	13.9
Downtown College Prep		399	25	16
Ernesto Galarza Elementary School		350		21.1
Empire Gardens Elementary School		450	19	23.7
Gardner Elementary School		549	27	20.3
Grant Elementary School		602	28	21.5
Graystone Elementary School		758	36	21.1
Gunderson High School		1128	57	19.8
Hacienda Environmental Science Magnet School		688	32	21.5
Hammer Montessori Magnet School		312	14	22.3
Bret Harte Middle School		1999	56	21.3
Herbert Hoover Middle School		1093	63	17.3
Leland High School		1795	82	21.9
Liberty High School		334	26	12.8
Abraham Lincoln High School		1786	84	21.2
Los Alamitos Elementary School		703	31	22.7
Lowell Elementary School		399	25	17.1
Horace Mann Elementary School		614	32	16
Middle College High School		42	2	21
John Muir Middle School		1178	54	21.8
Muwekma Ohlone Middle School		883	51	20.2
Selma Olinder Elementary School	Olinder-Bonita	443	32	13.8
Pioneer High School		1627	77	21.1
Reed Elementary School		513	23	22.3
River Glen Elementary School		538	26	20.7
San Jose Community High School		15	5	3
San Jose High School		1119	58	19.3
Schallenberger Elementary School		564	25	22.7
Simonds Elementary School		719	31	23.2
Terrell Elementary School		529	29	18.2
Trace Elementary School		1002	51	19.4
Washington Elementary School		507	34	14.9
Williams Elementary School		718	28	25.6
Willow Glen Elementary School		749	33	22.7
Willow Glen High School		1589	77	20.6
Willow Glen Middle School		1227	73	16.8

* Note: Based on data from the 2013-2014 school year

== Transportation ==
San Jose Unified School District's bus fleet consists of the following

- Thomas Saf-T-Liner C2 Special needs (unknown amount)
- Thomas Saf-T-Liner HDX (unknown amount)

=== Historical fleet ===
- Gen 4 Blue Bird All American RE
- Gen 2 Thomas Saf-T-Liner WestCoast-ER
