= Powerlifting at the 1981 World Games =

The powerlifting events of World Games I were held on July 25–26, 1981, at Marriott's Great America amusement park in its Grandstand Pavilion (today the site of The Grizzly roller coaster) in Santa Clara, California. These were the first World Games, an international quadrennial multi-sport event, and were hosted by the city of Santa Clara in the United States. The powerlifting events apparently had a dearth of competitors, as there were no bronze medals awarded in eight of the nine events, and lifters representing the United States won 15 of the 18 medals awarded. In the -100 kg class, Jim Cash of the U.S. set world records in both dead lift and total lift.

== Medalists ==
Event	Gold	Silver	Bronze
Men
-52kg	Hideaki Inabe (JPN)	Don MacVicar (USA)	
-56kg	Gary Hunnicut (USA)		
-60kg	Chokichi Ito (JPN)	George Hummel (USA)	Mark Shijo (USA)
-75kg	Mauro Di Pasquale (CAN)	Ray Neeley (USA)	
-82.5kg	Jim Grudzien (USA)	Dennis Wright (USA)	
-90kg	Walter Thomas (USA)	Jim Len (USA)	
-100kg	Jim Cash (USA)	Fred Hatfield (USA)	
-110kg	Scott Palmer (USA)	Gene Kunit (USA)	
Super heavyweight	Doyle Kenady (USA)	Dave Shaw (USA)	

== Details ==
=== −52 kg ===
1. Hideki Inabi, Japan, 565 kg (squat 227.5, bench press 117.5, deadlift 220) 2. Don McVicar, Canada, 503 kg (192.5, 135.5, 175)

=== −56 kg ===
1. Gary Hunnicut, USA, 437.5 kg (155, 117.5, 165)

=== −60 kg ===
1. Chokichi Ito, Japan, 597.5 kg (215, 142.5, 240) 2. George Hummel, USA, 585 kg (210, 140, 235) 3. Mark Shijo, USA, 432.5 kg (162.5, 85, 185)

=== −75 kg ===
1. Mauro Di Pasquale, Canada 2. Ray Neeley, USA

=== −82.5 kg ===
1. Jim Grudzien, USA 2. Dennis Wright, USA

=== −90 kg ===
1. Walter Thomas, USA, 907.5 kg. 2. Jim Len, USA, 727.5 kg

=== −100 kg ===
1. Jim Cash, USA, 937.5 kg (world record; also set a world record in the dead lift) 2. Fred Hatfield, USA, 915 kg

=== −110 kg ===
1. Scott Palmer, USA, 765 kg 2. Gene Kunit, USA, 675 kg

=== Super heavyweight ===
1. Doyle Kenady, USA 985 kg 2. Dave Shaw, USA, 925 kg
