= Bowling at the 1981 World Games =

The ten-pin bowling events of World Games I were held on July 28 – August 1, 1981, at Homestead Lanes in Cupertino, California, in the United States. These were the first World Games, an international quadrennial multi-sport event, and were hosted by the city of Santa Clara.

== Medalists ==
Event	Gold	Silver	Bronze
Men
Singles	Arne Svein Strøm (NOR)	Ernst Berndt (AUT)	Chris Batson (AUS)
Women
Singles	Liliane Gregori (FRA)	Porntip Singha (THA)	Mary Lou Vining (USA)
Mixed
Doubles	Ruth Guerster; Chris Batson (AUS)	Ari Leppala; Mikko Kaartinen (FIN)	Hilde Reitermaier; Ernst Berndt (AUT)

== Details ==
=== Men ===
==== Singles ====
Preliminary round

Eliminated – Tus-Yank Kwo (Chinese Taipei), Andre Van Gurp (Netherlands), Juan Roquebert (Panama), Rocky Dears (Bermuda), John Basaraba (Puerto Rico), Rick Knockaert (Canada), Terry Chea (Bahamas)

Early knockout round

Winners bracket– Arne Strom, Norway, d. P. S. Nathan, Malaysia, 386-336; Neville Robinson, Britain, d. Young Gak Kim, Korea, 412-371; Mats Karlsson, Sweden, d. Jim Lindquist, U.S., 371-367; Chris Batson, Australia, d. Frank Maes, Belgium, 371-361; Paeng Nepomuceno, Philippines, d. Mikko Kaartinen, Finland, 368-353; Ernst Berndt, Austria, d. Ryuichiro Goto, Japan, 417-337; Suracha Kasemsiriroj, Thailand, d. Phillipe Dubois, France, 448-405; Utz Dehler, W. Germany, d. Edward Chia-Gee Lee, Hong Kong, 376-365.

Losers bracket – Surachai Kasemsiriroj, Thailand, d. P.S. Nathan, Malaysia, 421-368; Frank Maes, Belgium, d. Mats Karlsson, Sweden, 404-383; Paeng Nepomuceno, Philippines, d. Nikko Kaartinen, Finland, 442-428; Edward Lee, Hong Kong, d. Neville Robinson, Britain, 343-0342. Maes d. Kasemsiriroj, 373-367; Nepomucesno d. Lee, 408-329.

Later knockout round

Winners bracket – Arne Strom, Norway, d. Neville Robinson, Britain, 407-352; Chris Batson, Australia, d. Mats Karlsson, Sweden, 425-411; Ernst Berndt, Austria, d. Paeng Nepomuceno, Philippines, 377-360; Utz Dehler, W. Germany, d. Surachi Kasemsiriroj, Thailand, 403-383.

Losers bracket – P. S. Nathan, Malaysia, d. Young Gak Kim, Korea, 376-355; Frank Maes, Belgium, d. Jim Lindquist, U.S., 373-369; Mikko Kaartinen, Finland, d. Ryuichiro Goto, Japan, 406-359; Edward Lee, Hong Kong, d. Philippe Dubois, France, 463-356.

Roll-off for 16th place – Edward Lee, Hong Kong, d. Rick Knockaert, Canada, 189-174.

Semifinals – Arne Strom, Norway, d. Chris Batson, Australia, 399-359; Ernst Berndt, Austria, D. Utz Dehler, W. Germany, 468-358.

Final – Arne Strom, Norway d. Ernst Berndt, Austria, 224-170 in playoff, after Berndt d. Strom, 398-390. Gold, Strom. Silver, Berndt. Bronze, Chris Batson, Australia

=== Women ===
==== Singles ====
Preliminary round

Eliminated – Gisela Lins (West Germany), Joan Hollis (Bermuda), Maricel Berges Ayala (Colombia), Sylvia Haven (Bahamas), Nellie Castillo (Philippines), Mulathy Nathan (Malaysia), Gyung Ok Jun (South Korea), Jui-Fu Chen (Chinese Taipei), Elias Isabel De Bennett (Panama)

Early knockout round

Winners bracket – Airi Leppala, Finland, d. Jacqueline Coudere, Belgium, 393-349; Portnip Singha, Thailand, d. Hilde Reitermaier, Austria, 416-344; Liliane Gregori, France, d. Warsini Rahardjo, Indonesia, 321-314; Ruth Guerster, Australia, d. Judy Peterson, Canada, 410-345; Frances Perez, Puerto Rico, d. Toshi-ko Ohbe, Japan, 352-351; Mary Lou Vining, U.S., d. Catherine Che, Hong Kong, 378-366; Tove Walstad, Norway, d. Yvonne Berndt, Sweden, 352-306; Irene Gronert, Netherlands, d. Gillian Holt, Britain, 347-327.

Losers bracket – Tove Walstad, Norway, d. Jacqueline Coudere, Belgium, 373-372; Toshi-Ko Ohbe, Japan, d. Frances Perez, Puerto Rico, 427-363; Warsini Rahardjo, Indonesia, d. Rith Guerster, Australia, 358-327; Yvonne Berndt, Swedsen, d. Aira Leppala, Finland, 427-353. Rahardjo d. Walstad, 436-354; Berndt d. Ohbe, 392-352.

Later knockout round

Winners bracket – Portnip Singha, Thailand, d. Airi Leppaia, Finland, 392-371; Liliane Gregori, France, d. Ruth Guerster, Australia, 385-369; Mary Lou Vining, U.S., d. Frances Perez, Puerto Rico, 336-335; Irene Gronert, Netherlands, d. Tove Walstad, Norway, 374-360.

Losers bracket – Jackqueline Coudere, Belgium, d. Hilde Reitermaier, 365-325; Warsini Rahardjo, Indonesia, d. Judy Peterson, Canada, 370-335; Yvonne Berndt, Sweden, d. Gillian Holt, Britain, 450-353.

Semifinals – Liliane Gregori, France, d. Portnip Singha, Thailand, 380-367; Mary Lou Vining, U.S., d. Irene Gronert, Netherlands, 371-360.

Final – Liliane Gregori, France d. Portnip Singha, Thailand, 349-341. Gold, Gregori. Silver, Singha. Bronze, Mary Lou Vining, USA.

=== Mixed ===
==== Doubles ====
Final – Ruth Guerster (222)/Chris Batson (179), Australia d. Airi Leppala (155)/Mikki Kaartinen (190), Finland, 399-345. Gold, Guerster/Batson. Silver, Lappala/Kaartinen. Bronze, Hilde Reitermaier/Ernst Berndt, Austria.
