= 1981 World Games =

Multi-sport event in Santa Clara, California, US

World Games I
- Host city: Santa Clara, California, US
- Nations: 58
- Athletes: 1,400 (est.)
- Events: 104
- Opening: July 24, 1981
- Closing: none held
- Opened by: Kim Un-yong; President of World Games I Executive Committee
- Main venue: Toso Pavilion (19 events)

Cover of the World Games I brochure produced for Santa Clara in 1981.

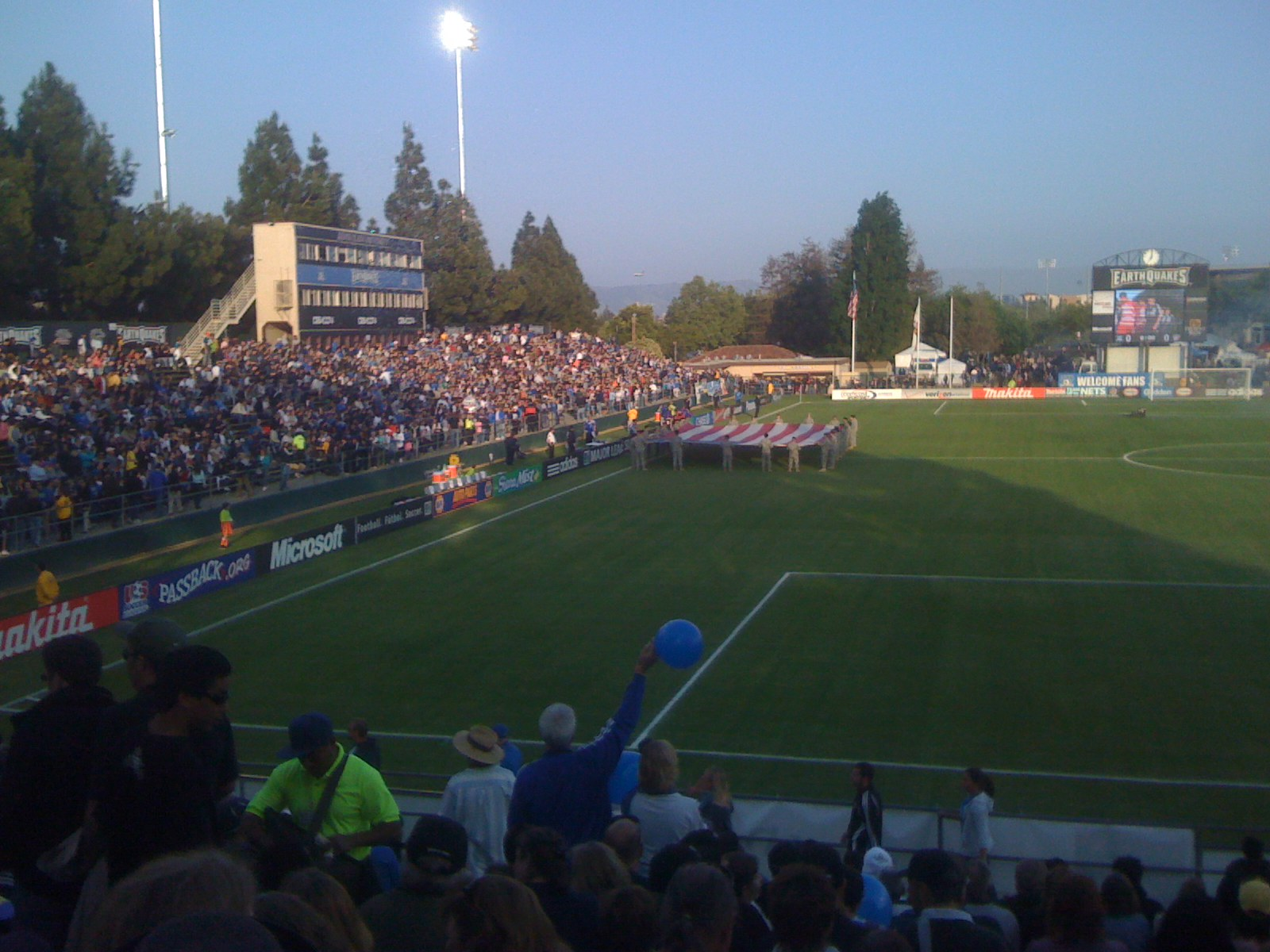
Buck Shaw Stadium, site of the opening ceremonies and tug of war matches

Location of Santa Clara, the host city, in California on the west coast of the United States.

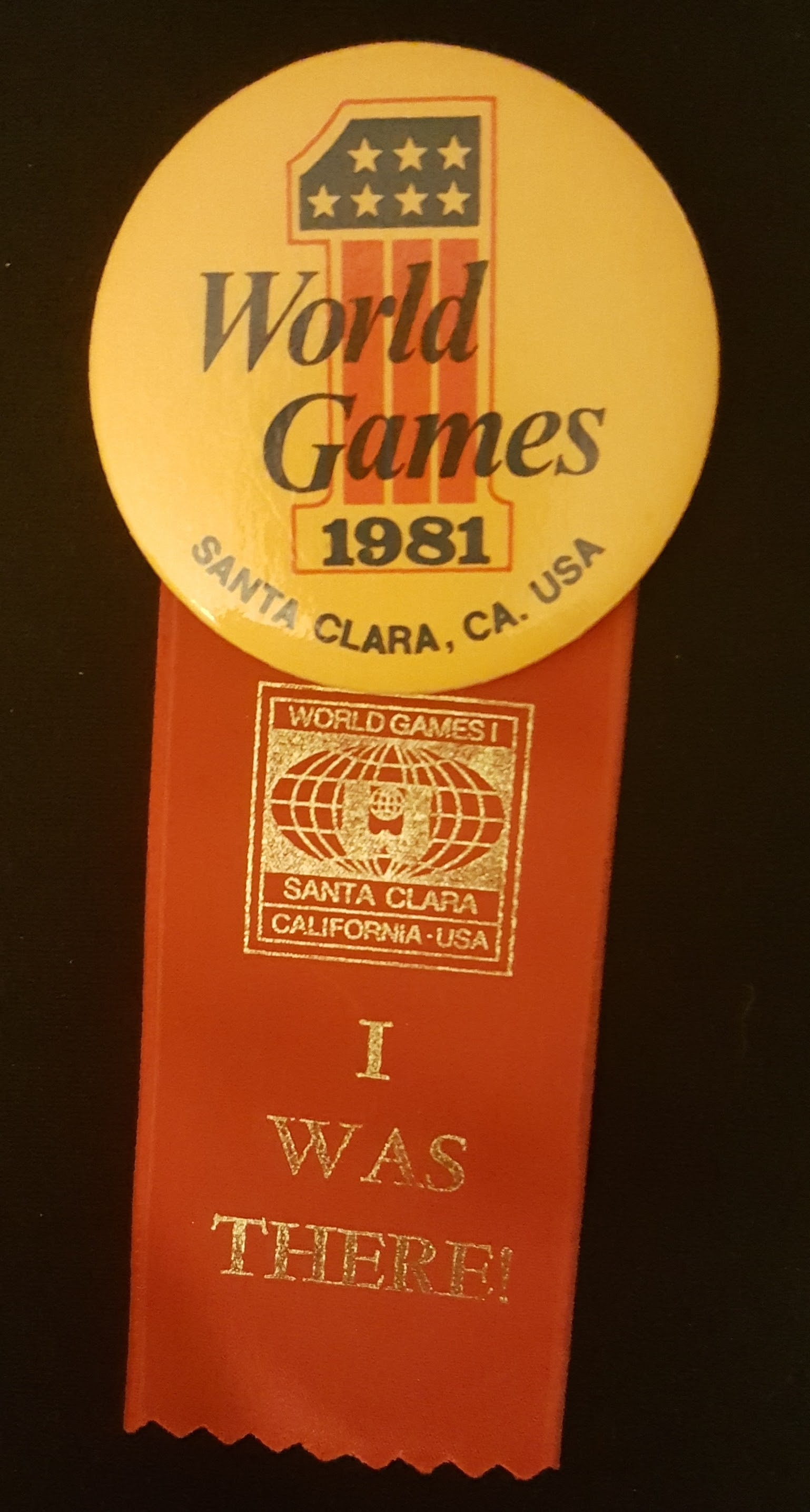
World Games I souvenir button

The 1981 World Games were the first World Games, an international multi-sport event, and were held in Santa Clara, California, United States. The games featured sports that were not included in the Olympics, including tug-of-war, racquetball, baseball and softball, artistic roller skating, roller hockey, roller speed skating, finswimming, karate, women's water polo, bowling, bodybuilding, waterskiing, casting, badminton, trampoline, powerlifting and taekwondo. Best estimates for attendance figures were that about 80,000 spectators witnessed the first World Games.

== Implementation ==
The World Games Council was formed independently of the International Olympic Committee (IOC) and adopted policies designed to avoid problems that had plagued the Olympic Games for several decades. For example, construction of new facilities was not required or encouraged. Any flags displayed at ceremonies and Games sites were limited to the flags of the participating sports federations. No national anthems were played nor national flags displayed. Athletes entered the opening ceremonies grouped by sport under individual federation banners rather than by country. Athletes also were housed according to sport. The respective sport federations paid for each athlete's housing, food and airfare.

The decision to stage World Games I was finalized in January, 1981. The organizing efforts were seriously set back when the Games' promotions agency, Global Sports Management of New York, pulled out in the final months. "It's a humble beginning to what we think is going to be a hard-earned, but successful and regularly-held international event. It's a miracle it is taking place at all," said World Games I promotions and sales coordinator Kent Hertenrath.

Kim Un-yong, president of the World Games executive committee, opened the Games with a brief address. “Our theme is sport for the sake of sport and a total disregard for where an athlete comes from,” said Kim. Casey Conrad, executive director of the President’s Council on Physical Fitness, represented U.S. President Ronald Reagan, who had survived an assassination attempt four months earlier, in greeting the athletes. Governor of California Jerry Brown had planned to attend the opening ceremonies. But that summer, when Mediterranean fruit flies were discovered in the Santa Clara Valley, Brown withdrew to focus on emergency eradication efforts.

The Soviet Union had been invited to send athletes but, in the aftermath of the boycotted 1980 Summer Olympics in Moscow, instead worked to prevent the competition from ever occurring. An event-day official of the casting governing body said that it had located the casting venue on land, which was preferred by the Eastern Bloc nations, instead of on water, as was the usual practice, in a failed effort to encourage their participation (personal communication, August 1, 1981). Games secretary-general Don Porter said that some of the problems encountered in the first World Games were created by the International Olympic Committee, especially the Eastern Bloc countries. Porter said that the national Olympic committees of these countries, as well as the IOC, had intensely pressured the World Games. He stated, “I think the International Olympic Committee is very concerned about World Games. We’re not competing with the Olympic Games. We support the Olympic movement.”

In fact, the World Games were organized to welcome both Olympic and non-Olympic sports. The sport governing bodies that were members of the World Games Council desired to be accepted eventually into the Olympic Games. Looking to the future, the Council sought to rule out the potential for the IOC to deny a sport’s Olympic acceptance based on an exclusion of the Olympic sports from the World Games program. Therefore, the World Games Council encouraged the participation of the sport federations of the Olympic Games.

Indeed, the Olympic sport of boxing was to have been contested in these games and was featured on organizers' promotional materials. However, AIBA withdrew the sport from the program in the weeks before the opening of the games because of IOC disapproval. Don Porter stated that, according to the president of AIBA, Don Hall, the IOC threatened to exclude boxing from the 1984 Los Angeles Olympics if AIBA participated in the World Games.

In the morning after the close of these Games, U.S. air traffic controllers went on a nationwide strike, leaving some athletes temporarily stranded.

As for the competition, Games officials expressed great satisfaction. Kim said, "The important thing was the competition, and in that regard, the Games were a big success." Kim presented the city of Santa Clara with the first official Games flag.

The executive director of World Games I, John Bragg, envisioned more than 50 sports participating in future events. "[H]opefully we will set the trend for many World Games to come. ... ," he said. "People here are beginning to realize that this is not just another competition. We could really revolutionize and clean out some of the negative aspects of international sports." At the time, the World Games Council planned to hold the Games every two years and received presentations during the 1981 Games from prospective cities to host the 1983 edition, with London said to be the front-runner.

== Participants ==
58 nations sent athletes to the first World Games. The People’s Republic of China was the only communist country represented. (Poland was expected but evidently did not show.) Mainland China had not participated in a summer international multi-sport competition since one athlete competed in the 1952 Summer Olympics. China participated only in badminton, capturing four of the five gold medals.

World records in waterskiing and powerlifting highlighted the first weekend of competition. Ana Maria Carrasco of Venezuela broke her own world record in waterskiing tricks. In the 100 kg class in powerlifting, Jim Cash of the U.S. set world records in both dead lift and total lift.

Two athletes each won four individual gold medals in these games: Steve Rajeff of the U.S. in casting and Juergen Kolenda of West Germany in finswimming. Tom Peterson of the U.S., in roller speed skating, and Anne-Marie Rouchon of France, in finswimming, won three each.

Participating Nations at the 1981 World Games
- Argentina
- Australia
- Austria
- Bahamas
- Barbados
- Belgium
- Belize
- Bermuda
- Brazil
- Canada
- Chile
- China
- Chinese Taipei
- Colombia
- Curaçao
- Denmark
- Dominican Republic
- Ecuador
- Egypt
- England
- Fiji
- Finland
- France
- Great Britain
- Guatemala
- Hong Kong
- India
- Indonesia
- Ireland
- Israel
- Italy
- Ivory Coast
- Japan
- Kenya
- Luxembourg
- Malaysia
- Mexico
- Netherlands
- New Zealand
- Nigeria
- Norway
- Panama
- Paraguay
- Peru
- Philippines
- Portugal
- Puerto Rico
- Saint Vincent and the Grenadines
- Scotland
- Singapore
- South Korea
- Spain
- Sweden
- Switzerland
- Thailand
- United States (host)
- Venezuela
- Wales
- West Germany

== Sports ==
For seven World Games sports, according to their federation presidents at the time, the strongest competition ever held in those individual events was fielded at these Games. 104 titles were awarded in 16 sports, including one belatedly designated an "invitational" or demonstration sport. An invitational sport program did not exist at the time. An agreement was reached with FINA in the lead-up to the games not to allow women's water polo athletes to march in the opening ceremony, to assuage the displeasure of the International Olympic Committee (IOC) for its being included in the program.

as invitational sport

Sport	Titles	Notes
Badminton	5	venue: San Jose Civic Auditorium. China, in its first summer multi-sport event since the 1952 Summer Olympics, competed in badminton only, winning 4 gold medals.
Baseball	1	venue: San Jose Municipal Stadium. Teams: Australia, Panama, South Korea and United States.
Bodybuilding	6	venue: San Jose Center for the Performing Arts. Arnold Schwarzenegger, winner of seven consecutive world championships and later the governor of California, carried the flag of the International Federation of Bodybuilders in the opening ceremony.
Bowling	3	venue: Homestead Lanes, Cupertino, Ten-pin
Casting	11	venue: Gunderson High School, San Jose
Finswimming	12	venue: Santa Clara International Swim Center. This was the only sport in which athletes of the host nation were not entered.
Gymnastics:		venue: San Jose Civic Auditorium
Trampoline	6	
Tumbling	2	
Karate	9	venue: Buchser High School (Santa Clara), Toso Pavilion (Santa Clara University). Japanese athletes won five of the nine events.
Powerlifting	9	venue: Grandstand Pavilion (today the site of The Grizzly roller coaster), Marriott's Great America, Santa Clara . American athletes won six of the nine events.
Racquetball	4	venue: Decathlon Club (today the Bay Club), Santa Clara. This competition served as the first racquetball world championships. American athletes won all four events.
Roller sports:		Inline skates were not used.
Artistic skating	4	venue: Cal Skate, Milpitas. American athletes won all four events.
Speed skating	8	venue: Marriott's Great America Parking Lot J and neighboring streets, Santa Clara. The course was a 400-meter triangle-shaped track. The marathon road race was the first to be contested at the international level. Italian athletes won 12 of the 24 medals.
Roller hockey	1	venue: Cal Skate, Milpitas. Teams: Argentina, Brazil, Chile, Italy, Portugal and United States.
Softball	2	venue: Central Park, Santa Clara. Both men's and women's competitions were held. Kathy Arendsen pitched four shutouts for the U.S. women. Mexico's men withdrew, being replaced by a second U.S. squad, which won the gold.
Taekwondo	10	venue: Toso Pavilion, Santa Clara University. South Korean athletes won nine of the ten weight classifications. The victory of a Canadian athlete in the heavyweight class was called "the biggest upset of World Games I."
Tug of war	2	venue: Buck Shaw Stadium, Santa Clara University (site of the opening ceremonies) The first medal event of the first World Games was the outdoor 640 kg tug of war.
Water polo	1	venue: Santa Clara International Swim Center. Women's teams from the Netherlands, Canada and the U.S. (2) participated, playing six games.
Water skiing	8	venue: Berkeley Aquatic Park, Berkeley
Total	104	

== Medal table ==
The medal tally during the first World Games follows. The United States was at the top of the final medal table.

* Host nation (United States)

Rank	Nation	Gold	Silver	Bronze	Total
1	United States (USA)*	38	38	25	101
2	South Korea (KOR)	9	3	1	13
3	Italy (ITA)	7	14	19	40
4	France (FRA)	7	6	6	19
5	Japan (JPN)	7	4	5	16
6	Canada (CAN)	5	5	6	16
7	Great Britain (GBR)^{[a]}	4	4	4	12
8	Norway (NOR)	4	1	3	8
9	West Germany (FRG)	4	0	5	9
10	China (CHN)	4	0	0	4
11	Netherlands (NED)	3	4	5	12
12	Belgium (BEL)	3	0	4	7
13	Venezuela (VEN)	2	0	0	2
14	Australia (AUS)	1	4	5	10
15	Sweden (SWE)^{[a]}	1	4	3	8
16	Austria (AUT)	1	2	3	6
17	Switzerland (SWI)	1	2	1	4
18	Finland (FIN)	1	2	0	3
19	Chinese Taipei (TPE)	1	1	1	3
20	New Zealand (NZL)	1	0	0	1
20	Portugal (POR)	1	0	0	1
22	Spain (ESP)	0	3	3	6
23	Mexico (MEX)	0	2	5	7
24	Argentina (ARG)	0	1	2	3
24	Denmark (DEN)	0	1	2	3
24	Ivory Coast (CIV)	0	1	2	3
27	Egypt (EGY)	0	1	1	2
28	Thailand (THA)	0	1	0	1
29	Indonesia (INA)	0	0	3	3
30	Bahamas (BAH)	0	0	1	1
30	India (IND)	0	0	1	1
Totals (31 entries)		105	104	116	325

- Two bronze medals were awarded in each badminton (5), karate kumite (7) and taekwondo (10) event. No bronze medals were awarded in 8 of the 9 powerlifting events and the women's synchronized trampoline event. No silver medal was awarded in one powerlifting event. In women's individual trampoline, Canada and USA tied for the silver medal; thus no bronze medal was awarded.
- ^[a] The mixed badminton title was won by a pair of players from Sweden and Great Britain. Both nations are counted as having won a gold medal.

== Calendar ==
- All dates are Pacific Daylight Time (UTC−07:00)

OC	Opening ceremony	●	Event competitions	1	Gold medal events

July/August	24 Fri	25 Sat	26 Sun	27 Mon	28 Tue	29 Wed	30 Thu	31 Fri	1 Sat	2 Sun	Gold medal events
Ceremonies	OC										—N/a
Artistic roller skating				●	●	2	2				4
Badminton		●	●	●	5						5
Baseball				●	●	●	1				1
Bodybuilding							4	2			6
Bowling					●	●	●	●	3		3
Casting						1	2	4	1	3	11
Finswimming		4	5	3							12
Karate		●	●	9							9
Powerlifting		5	4								9
Racquetball									●	4	4
Road speed skating									2		2
Roller hockey				●	●	●	●	1			1
Softball							●	●	●	2	2
Taekwondo						3	3	4			10
Track speed skating						2	2	2			6
Trampoline gymnastics						4	4				8
Tug of war	1	1									2
Water polo		●	●	1							1
Water skiing		●	8								8
Total gold medal events	1	10	17	13	5	12	18	13	6	9	104
Cumulative total	1	11	28	41	46	58	76	89	95	104	Gold medal events
July/August	24 Fri	25 Sat	26 Sun	27 Mon	28 Tue	29 Wed	30 Thu	31 Fri	1 Sat	2 Sun	

== Gallery ==
IWGA World Games I gallery of photos here.

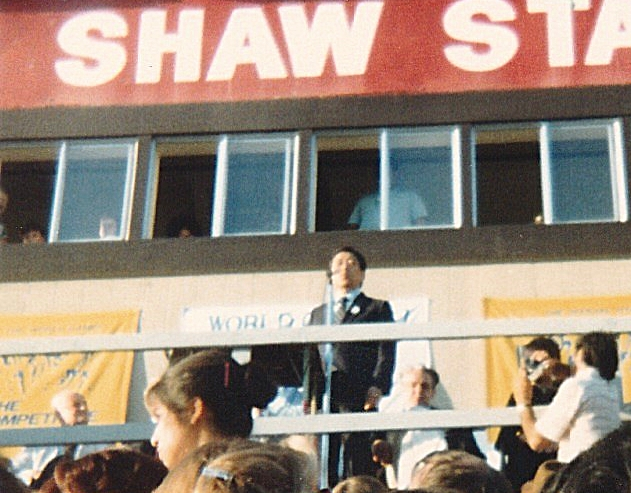
Dr. Kim Un-yong of South Korea opens World Games I.

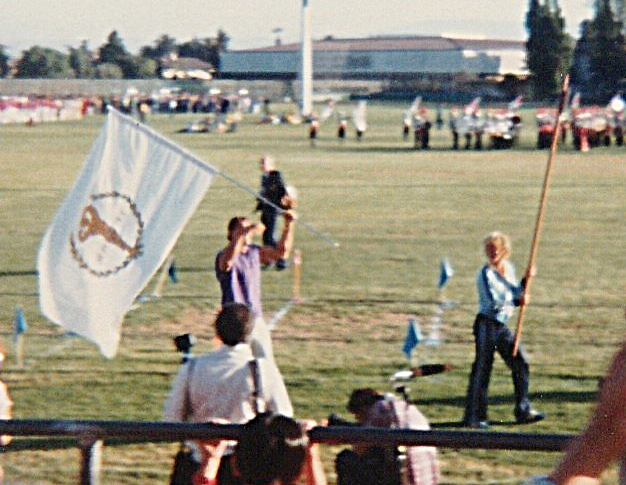
Arnold Schwarzenegger, winner of seven consecutive world championships, carries the flag of the International Federation of Bodybuilders in the opening ceremony of World Games I in 1981 at Santa Clara University, California.

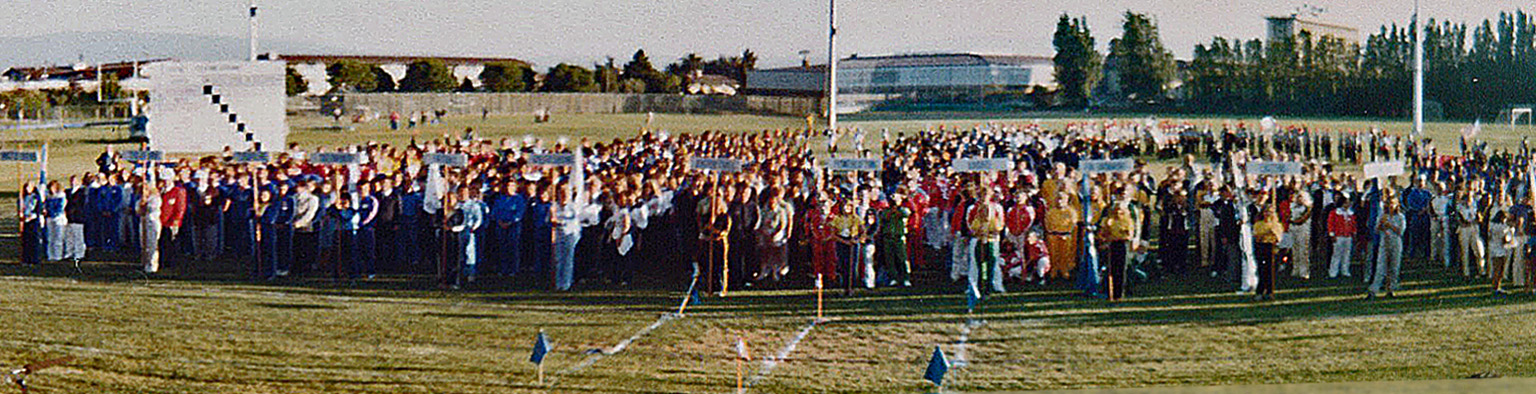
World Games I athletes grouped by sport at the inaugural opening ceremony; tug of war pulling area marked on foreground for first ever World Games event, which followed the ceremony

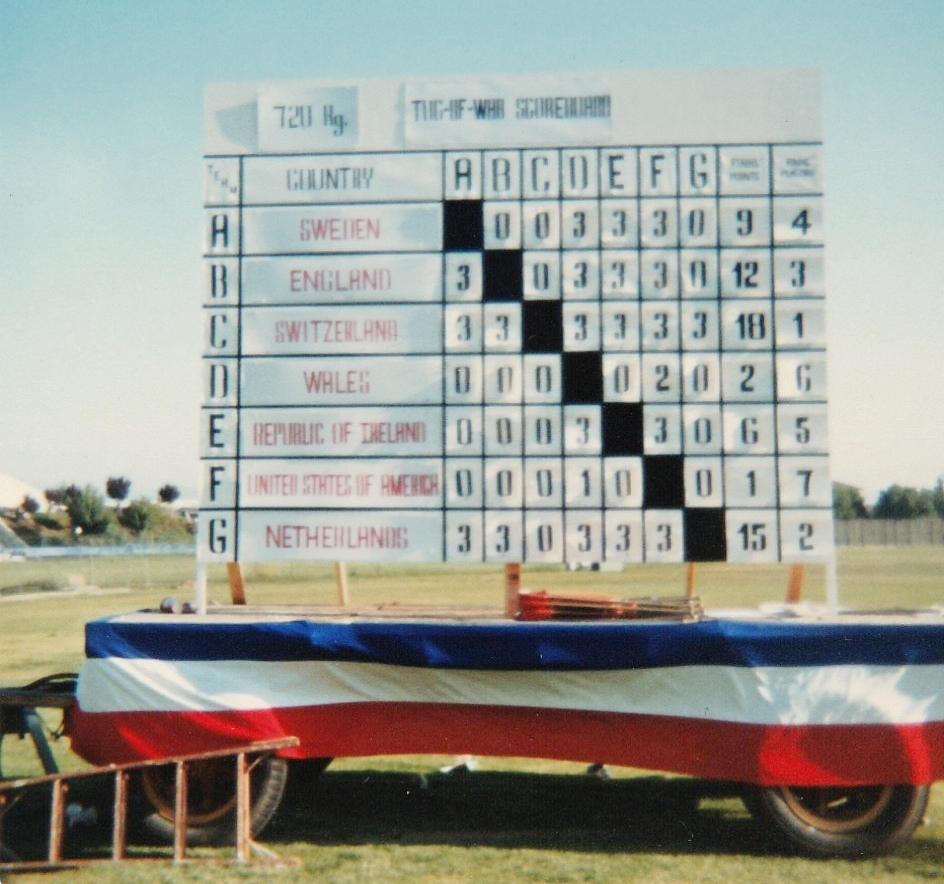
Men's 720 kg tug of war final scoreboard at World Games I

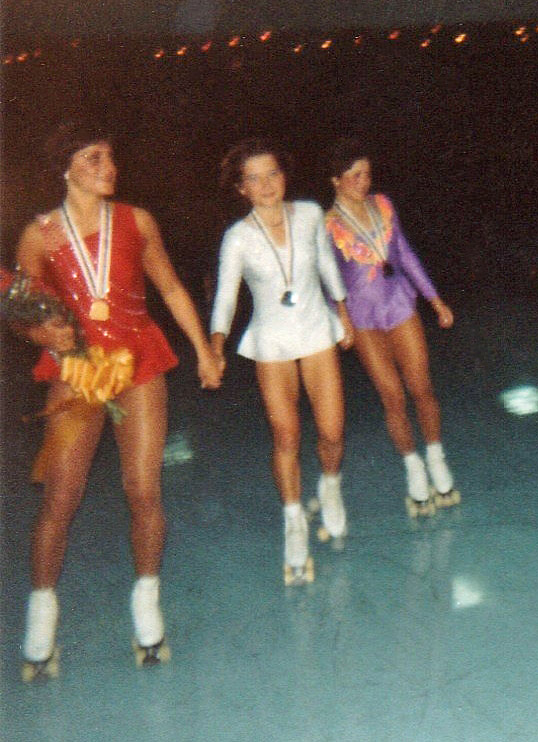
Artistic skating ladies singles gold, silver and bronze medalists (l to r) Anna Conklin (USA), Elena Bonati (ITA) and Tina Kneisley (USA) acknowledge the crowd at the medal ceremony.

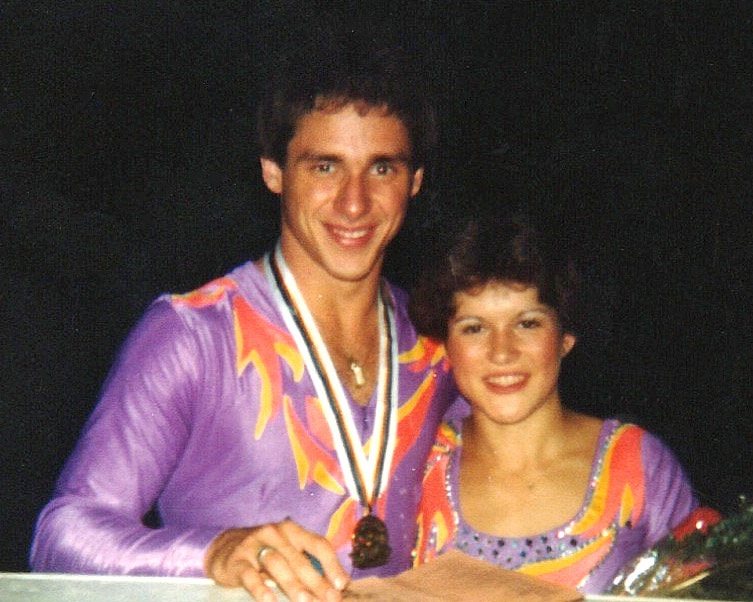
Artistic roller skating pairs gold medalists, Tina Kneisley and Paul Price (USA)

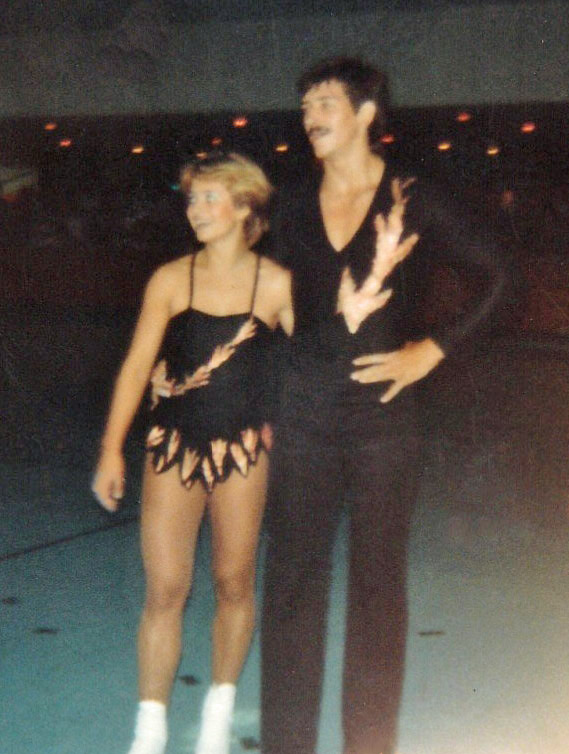
Sylvia Gingras and Guy Aubin (CAN), bronze medalists in pairs artistic roller skating at the 1981 World Games

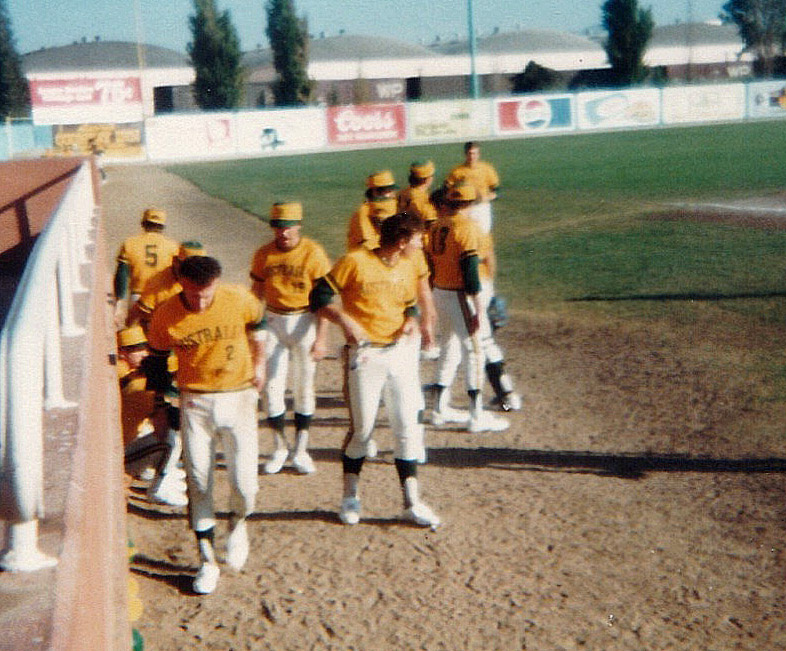
Australia's baseball team at World Games I in 1981 at San Jose Municipal Stadium

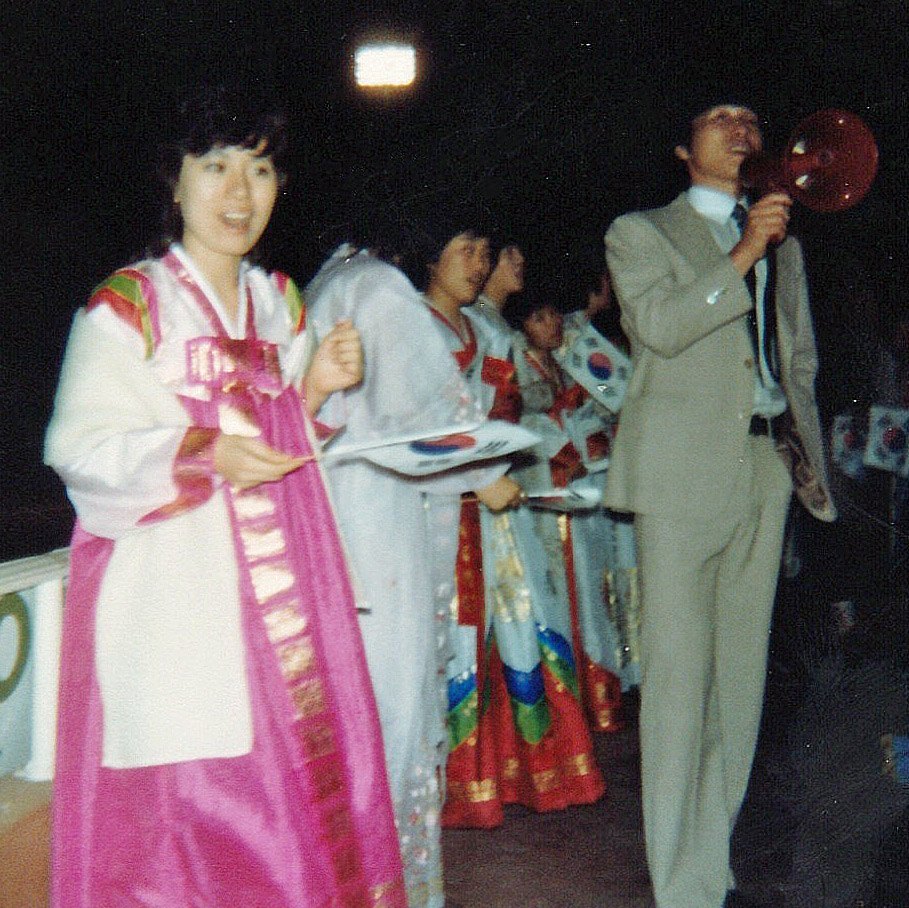
Korean baseball fans cheer for their team at World Games I.

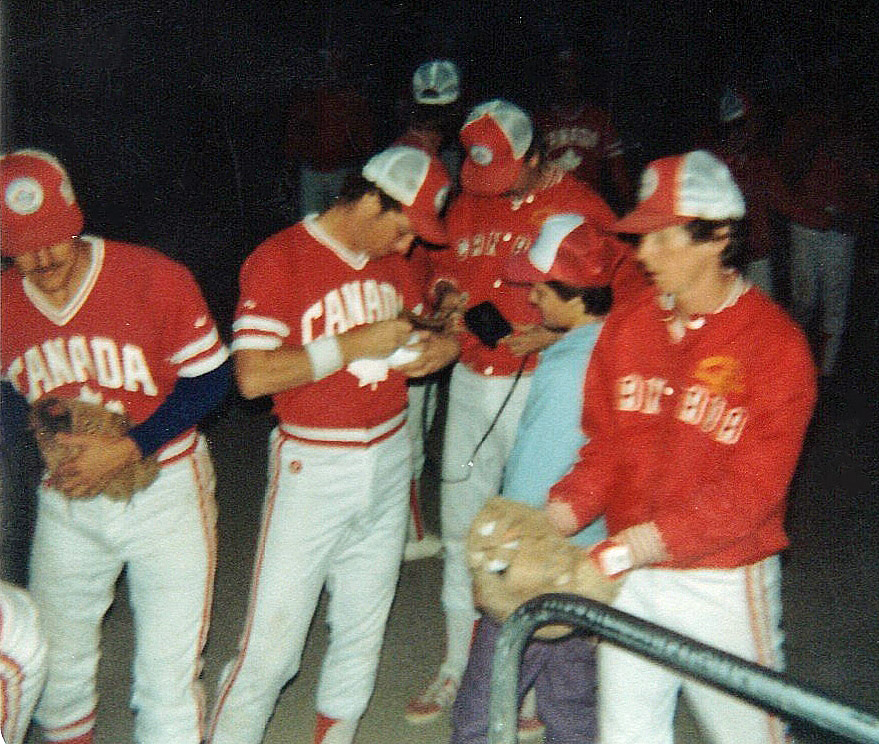
Canada's men's softball team at the 1981 World Games

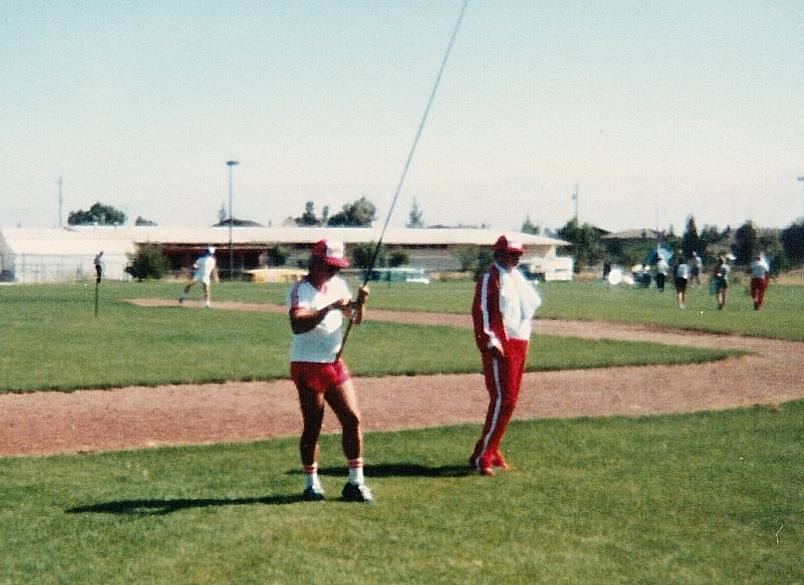
Casting athlete at World Games I

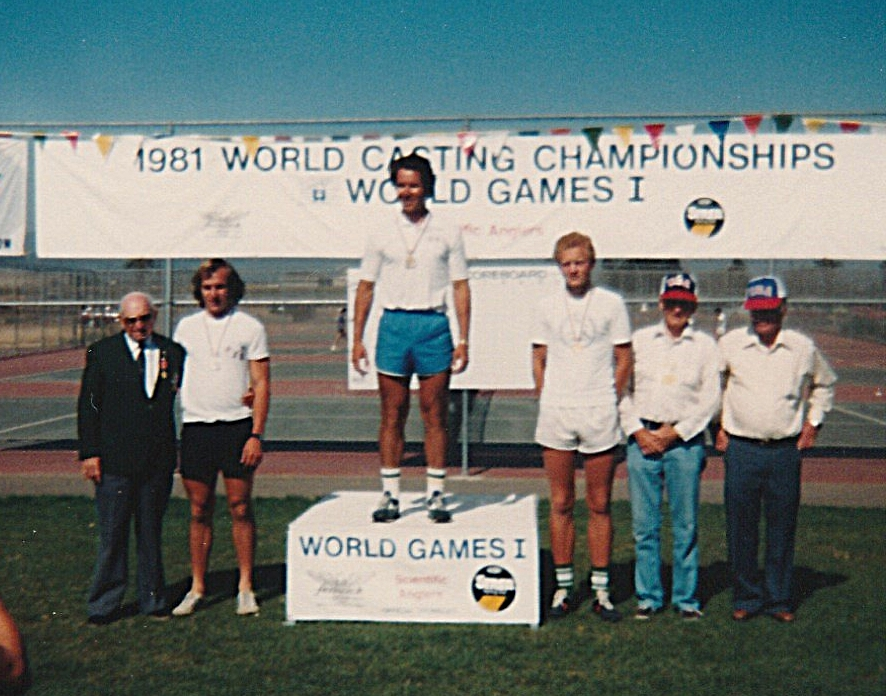
Casting - Multiplier Distance Single Handed gold, silver and bronze medalists, respectively – Steve Rajeff (USA), Chris Korich (USA) and Zack Willson (USA)

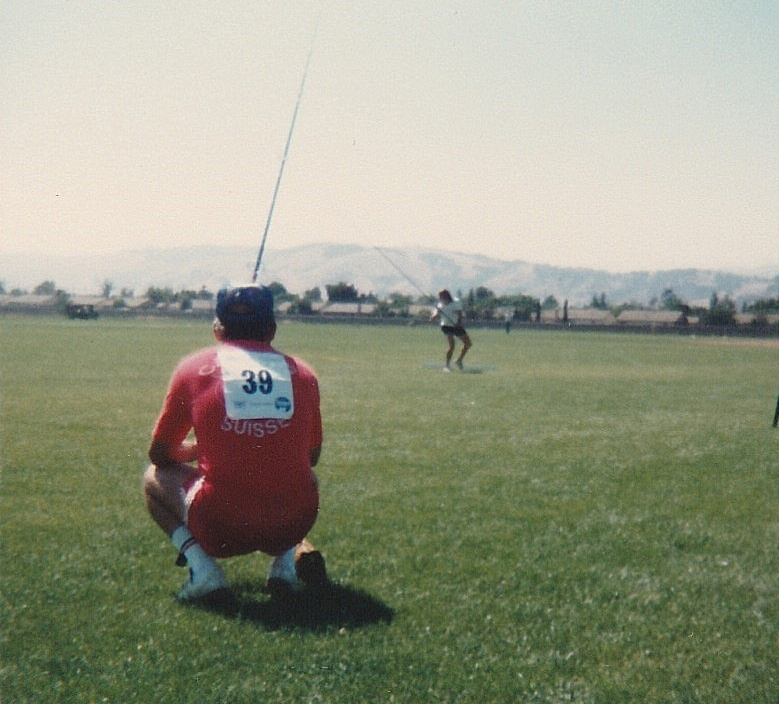
Casting competition at San Jose, California, during World Games I

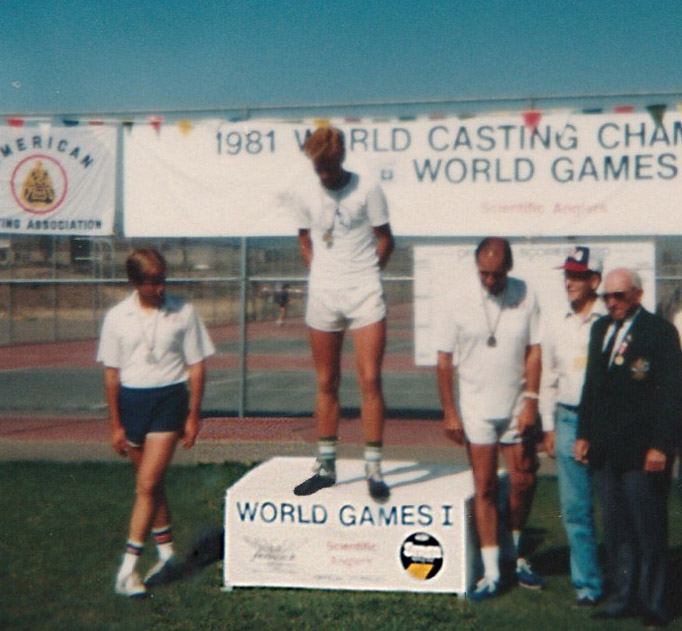
Casting - Multiplier Distance Double Handed gold, silver and bronze medalists, respectively: Chris Korich (USA), Art Walker (CAN) and Keith Pryor (USA)

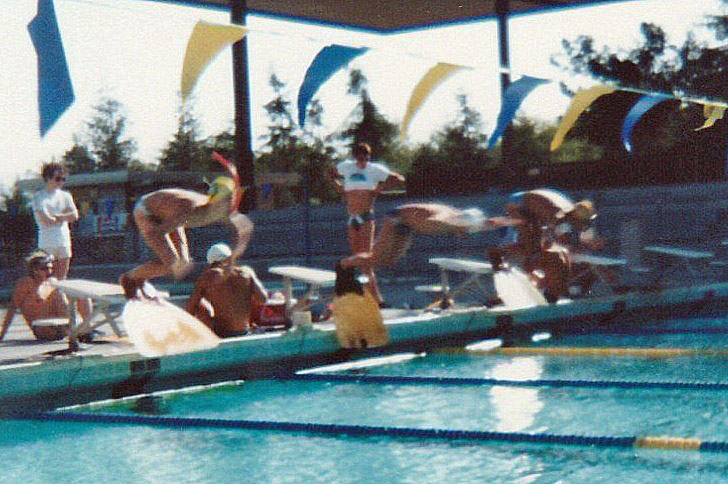
Finswimming competition at World Games I

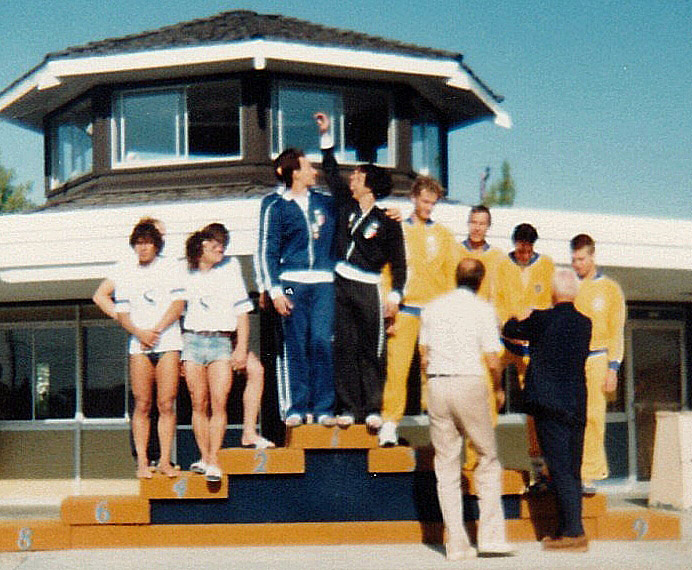
Medals podium for the unofficial men's finswimming 4x200m relay, with Italy II on top (time 6:30.16) and Sweden, the next single-nationality team, in third place. Other swimmers stood in for the second-place team of two West German and two French athletes.

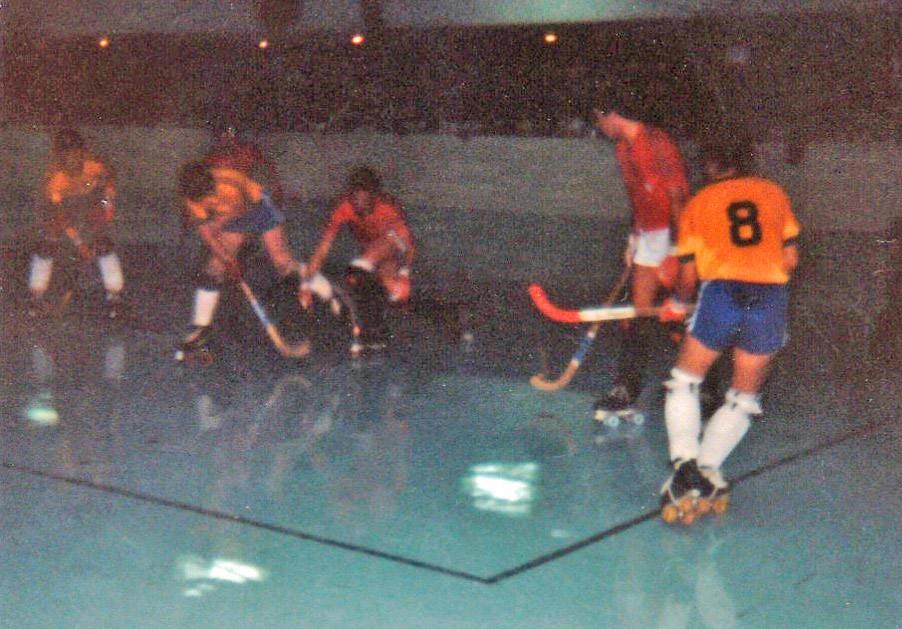
World Games I action in roller hockey

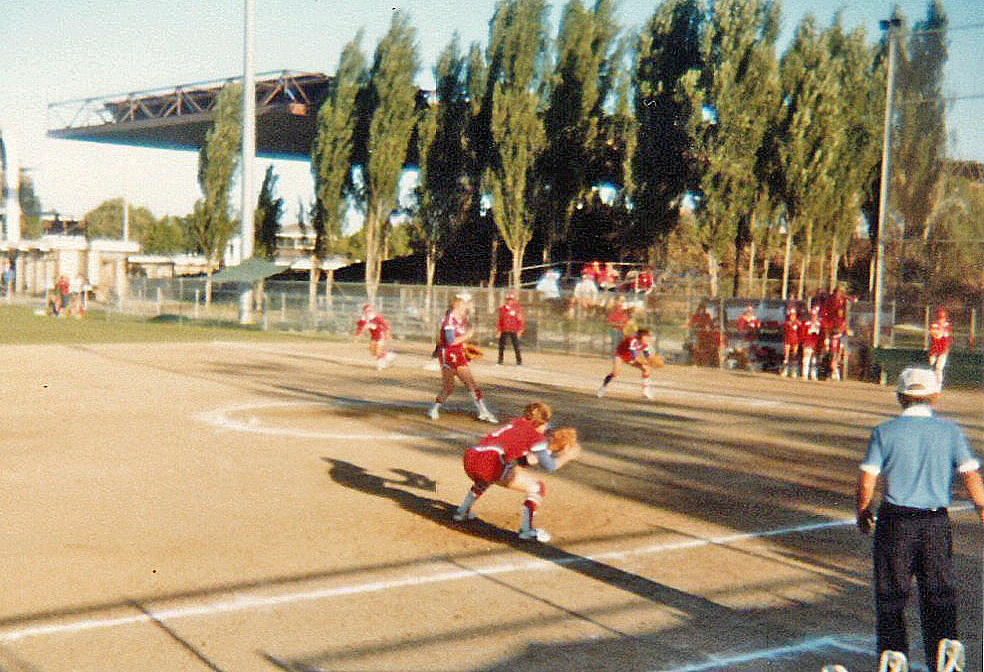
Women's softball at World Games I

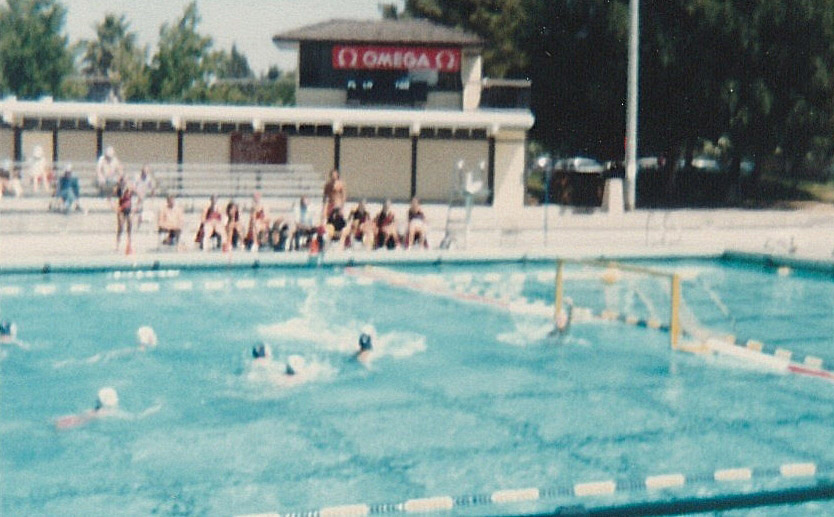
Women's water polo at World Games I

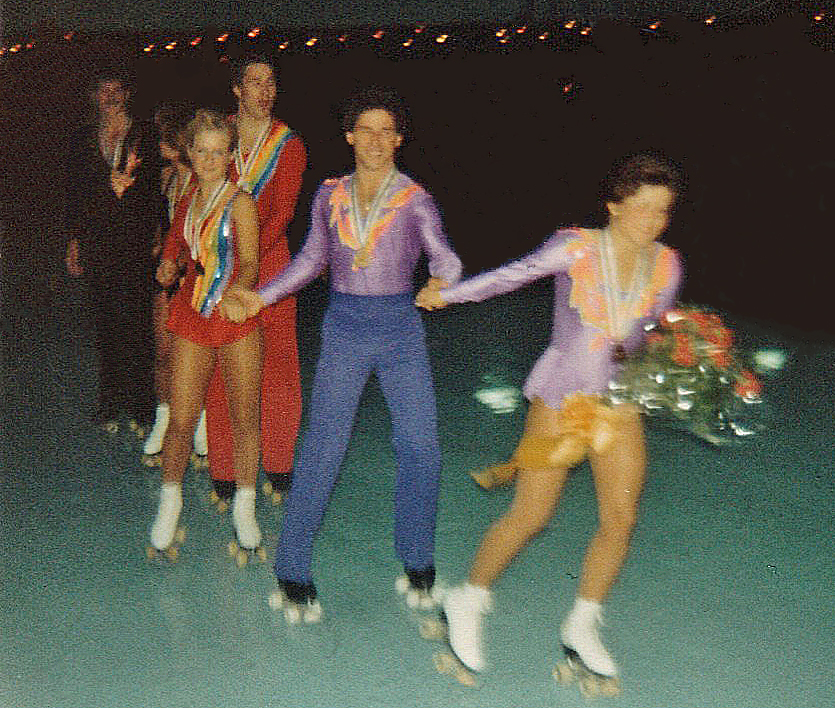
World Games I Pairs Artistic Skating medalists after podium ceremony, July 1981

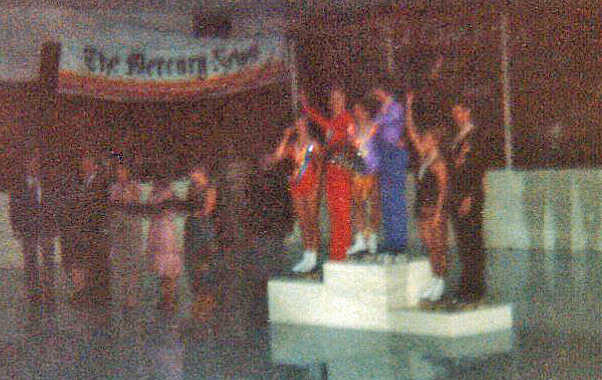
World Games I Pairs Artistic Skating medals podium, July 1981

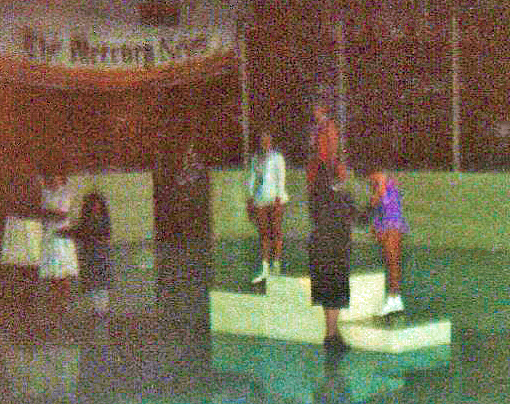
World Games I Ladies Artistic Skating medals podium, July 1981

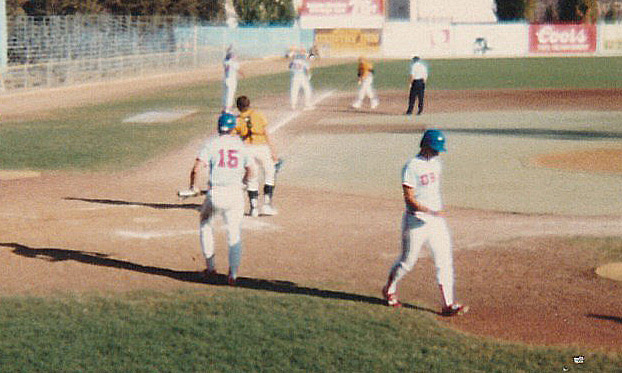
World Games I USA-Australia baseball game, July 1981

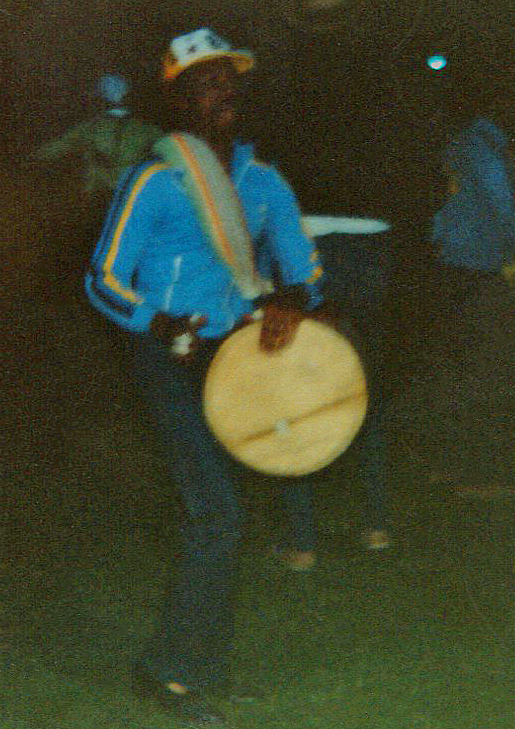
World Games I Women's Softball, Bahamas post-game celebration, August 1981. After the bronze-medal clinching women's softball game, Bahamian fans staged an impromptu celebration that wound its way around the perimeter of the field, with continual singing, dancing, music and Caribbean beats.
