= List of New York Excelsior players =

New York Excelsior is an American esports team founded in 2017 that competes in the Overwatch League (OWL). The Excelsior began playing competitive Overwatch in the 2018 season.

All rostered players during the OWL season (including the playoffs) are included, even if they did not make an appearance.

== All-time roster ==
As of September 30, 2022

Handle	Name	Role	Country	Seasons	Ref.
Anamo	Taesung Jung	Support	South Korea	2018–2020	
ANSOONJAE	Soonjae An	Support	South Korea	2022–present	
ArK	Yeonjun Hong	Support	South Korea	2018–2019	
BiaNcA	Dongwook Kim	Tank	South Korea	2019–2021	
FEATH5R	Seungwoo Lee	Damage	South Korea	2021	
Fl0w3R	Yeonoh Hwang	Damage	South Korea	2019	
Flora	Youngwoo Lim	Damage	South Korea	2021–present	
Friday	Minjae Jo	Support	South Korea	2021	
Gangnamjin	Namjin Gang	Support	South Korea	2022–present	
Gwangboong	Gwangwon Kim	Damage	South Korea	2021	
Haksal	Hyojong Kim	Damage	South Korea	2020	
Ho1	Howon Jeon	Support	South Korea	2022–present	
HOTBA	Hongjun Kim	Tank	South Korea	2020	
Ivy	Seunghyun Lee	Tank	South Korea	2021	
Janus	Junhwa Song	Tank	South Korea	2018	
JJonak	Seonghyun Bang	Support	South Korea	2018–2021	
Kalios	Wooyeol Shin	Tank	South Korea	2021	
Kellan	Minjae Kim	Tank	South Korea	2022–present	
Libero	Haeseong Kim	Damage	South Korea	2018–2020	
Mandu	Chanhee Kim	Support	South Korea	2020	
Mano	Donggyu Kim	Tank	South Korea	2018–2020	
MekO	Taehong Kim	Tank	South Korea	2018–2019	
Myunb0ng	Sangmin Seo	Support	South Korea	2022	
Nenne	Yeonkwan Jeong	Damage	South Korea	2019–2020	
Pine	Dohyeon Kim	Damage	South Korea	2018–2019	
Saebyeolbe	Jongryeol Park	Damage	South Korea	2018–2020	
Vulcan	Jack McArthur	Tank	United States	2022	
WhoRU	Seungjun Lee	Damage	South Korea	2020	
Yaki	Junki Kim	Damage	South Korea	2022–present	
Yakpung	Gyeongmu Jo	Tank	South Korea	2021	
