= Artistic roller skating at the 1981 World Games =

The artistic roller skating events of World Games I were held on July 27–30, 1981, at Cal Skate Roller Rink in Milpitas, California, in the United States. These were the first World Games, an international quadrennial multi-sport event, and were hosted by the city of Santa Clara.

== Medalists ==
Event	Gold	Silver	Bronze
Men
Singles	Mike Glatz (USA)	Rick Elsworth (USA)	Michele Biserni (ITA)
Women
Singles	Anna Conklin (USA)	Elena Bonati (ITA)	Tina Kneisley (USA)
Mixed
Pairs	United States; Tina Kneisley; Paul Price	United States; Ann Green; Rick Elsworth	Canada; Sylvia Gingras; Guy Aubin
Dance couples	United States; Holly Valente; William Richardson	United States; Cindy Smith; Mark Howard	Great Britain; Kim Geoghegan; Eamon Geoghegan

== Details ==
=== Men’s singles ===
Rank	Athlete	Nation	Short program	After free skate
1st place, gold medalist(s)	Mike Glatz	United States	1	1
2nd place, silver medalist(s)	Rick Elsworth	United States	2	2
3rd place, bronze medalist(s)	Michele Biserni	Italy	3	3
	Paul Irving	Australia	4	?
	Ivan Ragazzi	Italy	5	?
	Pierre Adjoury	Canada	6	?
	James Beaton	England	7	?
	Juan Carlos Hidalgo	Colombia	8	?

=== Women’s singles ===
Rank	Athlete	Nation	Short program	After free skate
1st place, gold medalist(s)	Anna Conklin	United States	2	1
2nd place, silver medalist(s)	Elena Bonati	Italy	1	2
3rd place, bronze medalist(s)	Tina Kneisley	United States	3	3
	Kathleen O'Brien Di Felice	United States	4	?
	Daniela Marinelli	Italy	5	?
	Irene Bates	New Zealand	6	?
	Barbara Pennington	Canada	7	?

=== Dance couples ===
Rank	Athletes	Nation	Compulsory dances	After free dance
1st place, gold medalist(s)	Bill Richardson; Holly Valenti	United States	1	1
2nd place, silver medalist(s)	Mark Howard; Cindy Smith	United States	2	2
3rd place, bronze medalist(s)	Eamon Geoghegan; Kim Geoghegan	Great Britain	3	3
	Jim Crouch; Sherrie McCumber	Canada	4	?
	Gianni Galetti; Azzurra Nascetti	Spain	5	?
	Gary Irving; Tracy Ferris	Australia	6	?

=== Pairs ===
Rank	Athletes	Nation	Compulsory dances	After free skate
1st place, gold medalist(s)	Paul Price; Tina Kneisley	United States	1	1
2nd place, silver medalist(s)	Rick Elsworth; Ann Marie Green	United States	2	2
3rd place, bronze medalist(s)	Guy Aubin; Sylvia Gingras	Canada	3	3
	Michael Hanrahan; Louise Hawdon	Australia	4	?
	Guglielmo Pistocchi; Sylvia Meco	Italy	no placing, Pistocchi fell	?

== Gallery ==
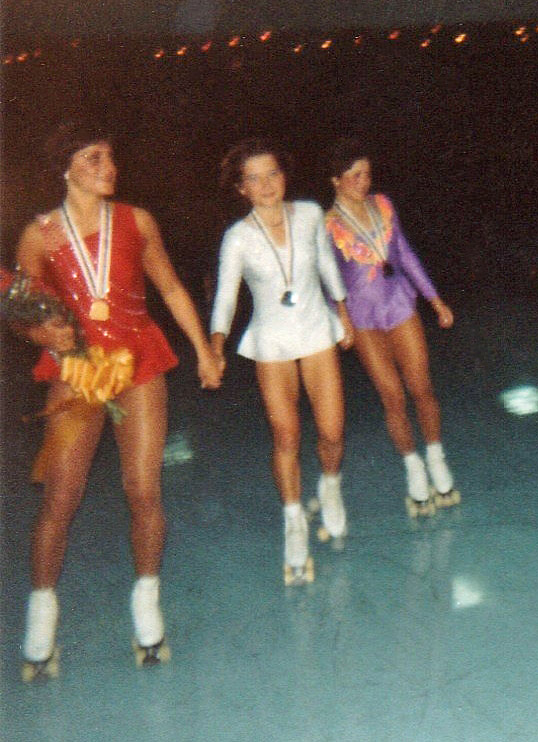
Artistic skating ladies singles gold, silver and bronze medalists (l to r) Anna Conklin (USA), Elena Bonati (ITA) and Tina Kneisley (USA) acknowledge the crowd at the medal ceremony.

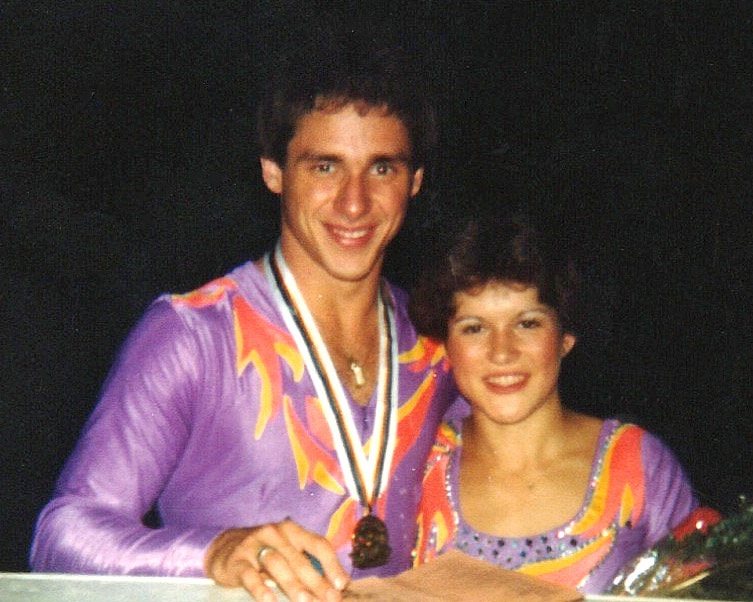
Artistic roller skating pairs gold medalists, Tina Kneisley and Paul Price (USA)

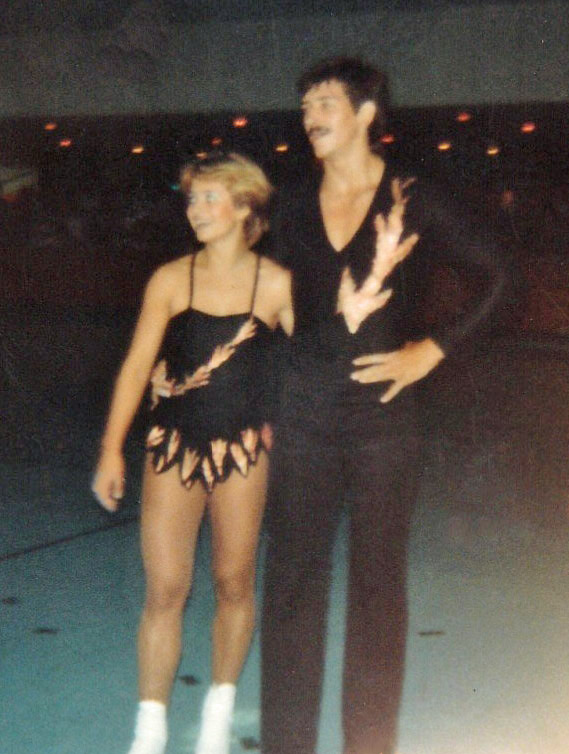
Sylvia Gingras and Guy Aubin (CAN), bronze medalists in pairs artistic roller skating at the 1981 World Games

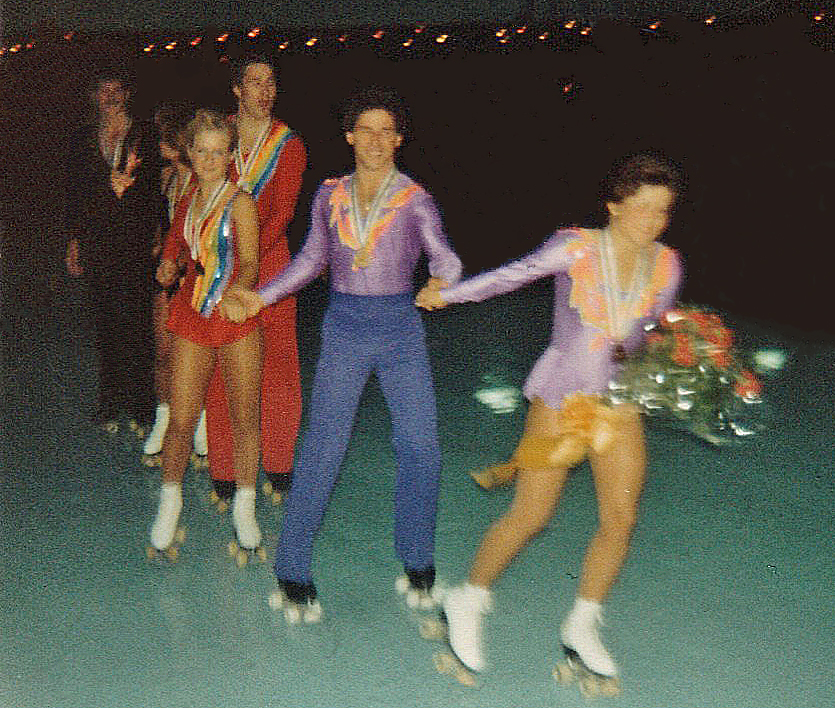
World Games I Pairs Artistic Skating medalists after podium ceremony, July 1981

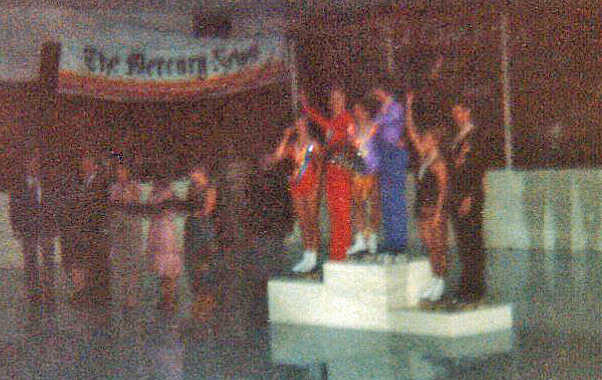
World Games I Pairs Artistic Skating medals podium, July 1981

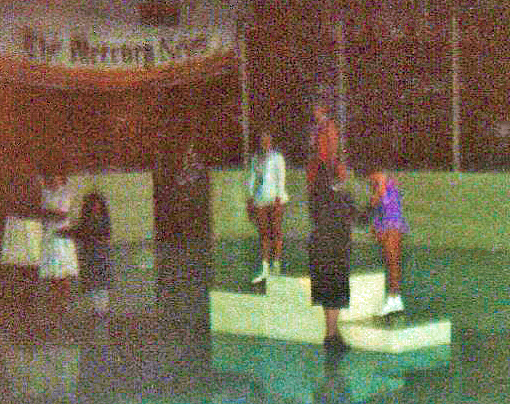
World Games I Ladies Artistic Skating medals podium, July 1981
