= List of Houston Outlaws players =

The Houston Outlaws are an American esports team founded in 2017 that competes in the Overwatch League (OWL). The Outlaws began playing competitive Overwatch in the 2018 season.

All rostered players during the OWL season (including the playoffs) are included, even if they did not make an appearance.

== All-time roster ==
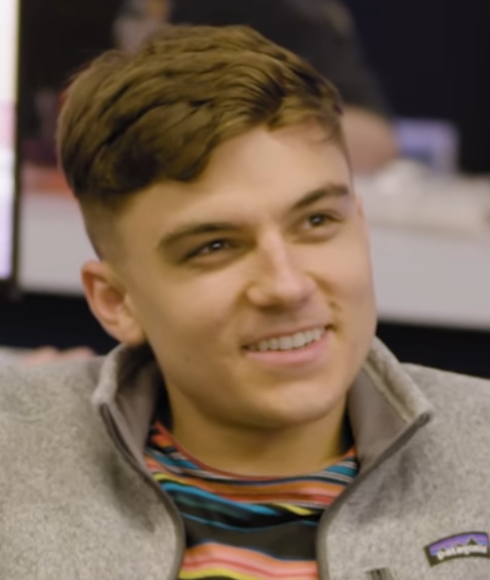
Jacob "JAKE" Lyon.

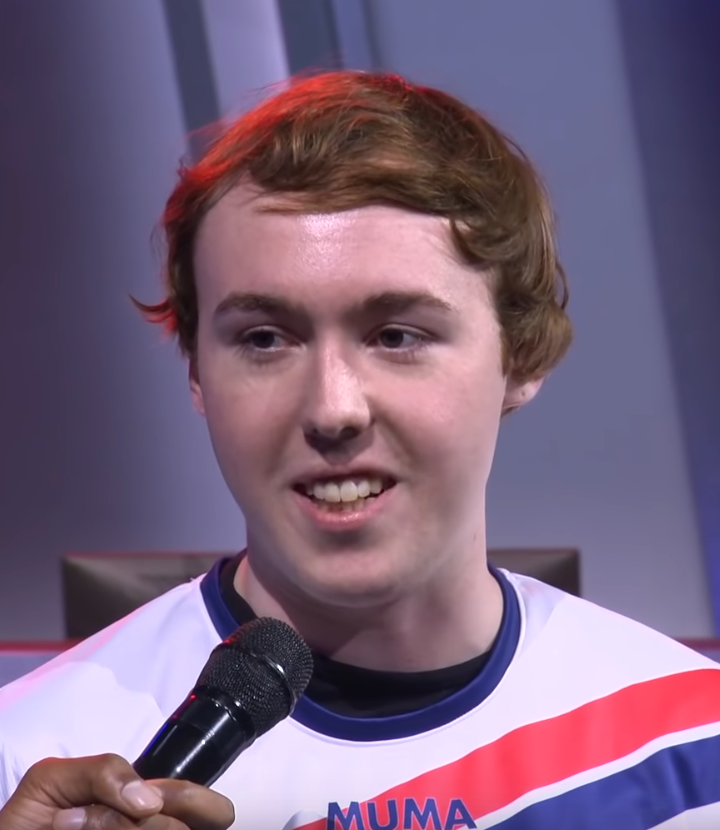
Austin "Muma" Wilmot.

As of December 15, 2021

Handle	Name	Role	Country	Seasons	Ref.
ArHaN	Wonhyeop Jeong	Damage	South Korea	2018–2019	
Bani	Christopher Benell	Support	Canada	2018–2019	
blasé	Jeffrey Tsang	Damage	United States	2020	
Boink	Daniel Pence	Support	United States	2018–2020	
Clockwork	Matt Dias	Damage	United States	2018	
coolmatt	Matt Iorio	Tank	United States	2018–2019	
Crimzo	William Hernandez	Support	Canada	2021	
Danteh	Dante Cruz	Damage	United States	2019–present	
Dreamer	Song Sanglok	Tank	South Korea	2021	
FCTFCTN	Russell Campbell	Tank	United States	2018	
Happy	Jeongwoo Lee	Damage	South Korea	2021	
Hydration	João Pedro Goes Telles	Damage, Tank	United States	2020–2021	
Ir1s	Seunghyun Kim	Support	South Korea	2022–present	
JAKE	Jacob Lyon	Damage, Support	United States	2018–2019, 2021–present	
Jecse	Seungsoo Lee	Support	South Korea	2020	
JJANGGU	Myungheum Cho	Tank	South Korea	2021	
Joobi	Enrique Triana	Support	United States	2021	
KSF	Kyle Frandanisa	Damage	United States	2021–present	
Lastro	Jungwon Mun	Support	South Korea	2022–present	
LiNkzr	Jiri Masalin	Damage	Finland	2018–2020	
MekO	Taehong Kim	Tank	South Korea	2020	
Mendokusaii	Lucas Håkansson	Damage	Sweden	2018	
Muma	Austin Wilmot	Tank	United States	2018–2020	
Pelican	Sehyun Oh	Damage	South Korea	2022–present	
PIGGY	Minjun Shin	Tank	South Korea	2021–present	
Rapel	Junggeun Kim	Support	South Korea	2020	
Rawkus	Shane Flaherty	Support	United States	2018–2020	
SPREE	Alexandre Vanhomwegen	Tank	Belgium	2018–2020	
