= Annie Lambrechts =

Belgian roller skater

Annie Lambrechts is a Belgian roller skating champion. She was awarded the Belgian Sportsman of the year prize in 1981. The same year she was also given the Belgian National Sports Merit Award. She won a total of 140 Belgian titles, 22 European titles, 2 gold and 2 bronze medals at the 1981 World Games. Between 1964 and 1981 she won 19 worldtitles. She was also the first Belgian to win the Flemish Sportsjewel in 1982.

She was married to former athlete André Dehertoghe.

== Records ==
20.000 m	Bahn	32:53.970	Kessel-Lo	1985	World record
30.000 m	Bahn	49:15.906	Kessel-Lo	1985	
50.000 m	Bahn	1:21:26.942	Kessel-Lo	1985	
