= Gunderson High School =

Public school in California, United States

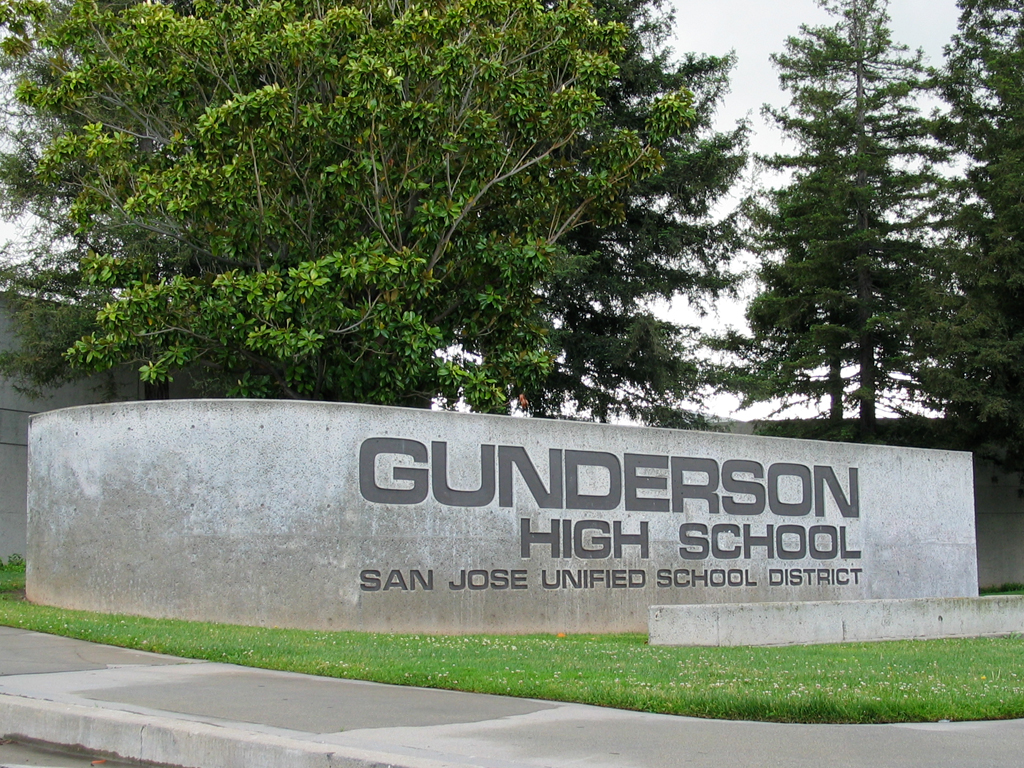
- 622 Gaundabert Lane; San Jose, CA

Information
- Type: Public
- Established: 1976
- School district: San Jose Unified School District
- Principal: Anisha Dalal
- Teaching staff: 49.22 (FTE)
- Grades: 9-12
- Enrollment: 827 (2023-2024)
- Student to teacher ratio: 16.80
- Colors: Gold and Brown
- Mascot: Grizzly Bear
- Website: gunderson.sjusd.org

Henry T. Gunderson High School is a high school situated in the Blossom Valley area of San Jose, California, which first opened in the fall of 1976. It drew the majority of its initial 10th - 12th grade student body from adjacent neighborhoods that were previously within the Pioneer and Leland high school boundaries. The school is part of the San Jose Unified School District and was given the maximum six-year accreditation in 2004, noting the performance of staff and faculty. The school principal is Anisha Dalal, and the average annual enrollment is about 1100 students.

== Technology program ==
Gunderson High School promotes itself as a Technology Magnet school offering a variety of classes through its technologically advanced academic program. Certain electives of the program include animation, multimedia design, digital photography, video production, computer aided design, and electronic music. Weekly school news, Gunderson Live, is also directed and broadcast by students on school televisions.

== Extracurricular activities ==
Gunderson's school newspaper, The Paw Print, is run and maintained by journalism students and is published monthly.

== Notable alumni ==
- James Jones, (class of 2002), NFL player
- Anjelah Johnson, comedian/actor
- John Ottman, Academy Award winning editor of Bohemian Rhapsody
- DJ Hollygrove, Grammy Winning DJ, and radio personality, attended (2000)
