= 2024 in strength sports =

This article lists the strength sports events for 2024.

== Arm wrestling ==
- 2024 WAF Calendar here.

=== WAF World & Continental Championships ===
- March 1–2: 2024 North American Armwrestling Championships in Mexico City
- March 14–16: 2023 African Games in (Ghana) Accra
- April 19–27: 2024 Asian Armwrestling Championship in (Iran) Kish Island
- May 2–12: 2024 European Armwrestling Championship in (Slovakia) Bratislava
- July 5–7: 2024 South America Armwrestling Championship in (Peru) Callao
- August 15–25: 2024 World Armwrestling Championship in (Moldova) Chișinău
- August: 2024 African Armwrestling Championship in (Ghana) Accra

=== International WAF Members Competitions ===
- February 2–3: World Cup - Hardanger Open 2024 in (Norway) Lofthus
  - Results here.
- February 12–17: Mr. Universe Iran in Ramsar
- March 8–10: World Cup SUPER MATCH 2024 in (Italy) Brescia
- May 10–12: Arnold Classic of Africa in (South Africa) Johannesburg
- September 28: Judgement Day in (Hungary) Halásztelek
- October 18–20: International Open Cup SPORT FEST 2024 in (Croatia) Poreč
- November: 2024 Asian Cup in India
- December 14–15: World Cup Iron Arm in (Romania) Bucharest

== Bodybuilding ==
- 2024 PRO Contest Schedule here.

=== IFBB Professional League ===
- March 1–3: 2024 Arnold Classic in (United States) Columbus
  - Men's Open winner: (Iran) Hadi Choopan
- March 15–17: 2024 Arnold Classic - UK in (United Kingdom) Birmingham
  - Men's Open winner: (Iran) Hadi Choopan
- April 5–7: 2024 Arnold Classic South America in (Brazil) São Paulo
  - Men's Open winner: (Brazil) Rafael Brandao
- April 14: 2024 Detroit Pro in (United States) Detroit
  - Men's Open winner: (United States) Martin Fitzwater
- April 26: 2024 Emerald Cup Masters Pro in (United States) Bellevue
- May 18: 2024 New York Pro in (United States) Teaneck
- October 11–12: 2024 Mr. Olympia in (United States) Las Vegas

== CrossFit ==
- CrossFit Competitions Calendar here.

=== 2024 CrossFit Games ===
==== Regional Semifinals ====
- May 17–19: Europe Semifinal by French Throwdown in (France) Décines-Charpieu
- May 17–19: Asia Semifinal by Far East Throwdown in (South Korea) Busan
- May 24–26: Oceania Semifinal by Torian Pro in (Australia) Brisbane
- May 24–26: North America West Semifinal by West Coast Classic in (United States) Carson
- May 31 – June 2: North America East Semifinal by Syndicate Crown in (United States) Knoxville
- May 31 – June 2: South America Semifinal by Copa Sur in (Brazil) Rio de Janeiro
- May 31 – June 2: Africa Semifinal by Renegade Games in (South Africa) Vanderbijlpark

==== World Finals ====
- August 8–11: 2024 CrossFit Games in (United States) Fort Worth

== Powerlifting ==
- 2024 IPF CALENDAR here.
- 2024 Powerlifting Results Database here.

=== World Championships ===
- May 21 – June 1: 2024 World Classic & Equipped Bench Press Championship in (United States) Austin
- June 16–23: 2024 World Classic Open Powerlifting Championships in (Lithuania) Druskininkai
- August 28 – September 8: 2024 World Classic & Equipped Sub-Junior & Junior Powerlifting Championships in (Malta) Valletta
- October 13–20: 2024 World Classic & Equipped Masters Powerlifting Championships in (South Africa) Sun City
- November 11–17: 2024 World Equipped Open Powerlifting Championships in (Iceland) Reykjavík

=== Continental Championships ===
- February 12–18: 2024 European Classic Master Powerlifting Championship in (Spain) Málaga
  - Official results: Men Women.
- March 12–17: 2024 European Open Classic Powerlifting Championships in (Croatia) Velika Gorica

  - Men's 59 kg: (Spain) Iván Campano Díaz
  - Men's 66 kg: (Italy) Federico Murru
  - Men's 74 kg: (Germany) Joshua Wright
  - Men's 83 kg: (United Kingdom) Jurins Kengamu
  - Men's 93 kg: (Norway) Trygve Sletten
  - Men's 105 kg: (Sweden) Emil Norling
  - Men's 120 kg: (United Kingdom) Tony Cliffe
  - Men's 120 kg+: (Georgia (country)) Temur Samkharadze
  - Women's 47 kg: (Italy) Annalisa Motta
  - Women's 52 kg: (France) Camille Hadrys
  - Women's 57 kg: (France) Sovannphaktra Pal
  - Women's 63 kg: (Italy) Chiara Bernardi
  - Women's 69 kg: (Norway) Marte Kjenner
  - Women's 76 kg: (Finland) Ellen Grönlund
  - Women's 84 kg: (United Kingdom) Ziana Azariah
  - Women's 84 kg+: (Belgium) Sonita Kyen Muluh

- May 1–4: 2024 European Masters Equipped Powerlifting Championships in (Luxembourg) Hamm
- May 1–5: 2024 FESUPO Equipped Powerlifting & Bench Press Championship in (Brazil) Caçador
- May 5–11: 2024 Asian Equipped Powerlifting Championship in Hong Kong
- May 7–12: 2024 European Open, Junior & Sub-Junior Equipped Powerlifting Championships in (Luxembourg) Hamm
- July 5–13: 2024 Asian African Pacific Powerlifting &Benchpress Championships (Classic & Equipped) in (South Africa) Potchefstroom
- July 22–26: 2024 FISU World Championships Powerlifting in (Estonia) Tartu
- August 5–10: 2024 IPF/NAPF North American Regional Powerlifting Championships in (United States) Scottsdale
- August 5–11: 2024 European Open, Sub-junior, Junior & Masters Classic & Equipped Bench Press Championships in (Turkey) Istanbul
- September 13–15: 2024 Western European Equipped & Classic Powerlifting Championships (Classic & Equipped) in (Malta) Valletta
- September 18–22: 2024 South American Classic Powerlifting - Men and Women in (Argentina) Buenos Aires
- September 23–28: 2024 Asian Equipped/Classic Bench Press Championships in (Kyrgyzstan) Bishkek
- October 4–11: 2024 Commonwealth Championships (Classic & Equipped) in (South Africa) Sun City
- October 6–13: 2024 European Sub-Junior & Junior Classic Powerlifting Championships in (Czech Republic) Plzeň
- October 7–14: 2024 Oceania Regional Powerlifting & Bench Press Championships in (New Caledonia) Nouméa
- October 30 – November 2: 2024 NAPF/FESUPO Pan-American Regional Bench Press Championships & NAPF North American Regional Bench Press Championships in (Costa Rica) San José
- December 1–10: 2024 Asian Classic Powerlifting Championships in (Uzbekistan) Tashkent

=== Other Events ===
- January 28: 2024 Reykjavik International Games in (Iceland) Reykjavík
- February 10: 2024 SBD Sheffield - Classic Powerlifting in (United Kingdom) Sheffield
- March 15–17: 2024 Arnold Sports Festival UK in (United Kingdom) Birmingham
- July 13–14: 2024 Euro Muscle Show in (Netherlands) Amsterdam

== Strongman ==
- Full 2024 Strongman Archives Results here.

=== Major International Competitions ===
- March 1–2: 2024 Arnold Strongman Classic in (United States) Columbus
  - Winner: (Canada) Mitchell Hooper
- March 1–2: 2024 Arnold Strongwoman Classic in (United States) Columbus
  - Winner: (United States) Angelica Jardine
- March 16–17: 2024 Arnold UK - Strongman in (England) Marston Green
  - Men's winner: (Canada) Mitchell Hooper
  - Women's winner: (United Kingdom) Lucy Underdown
- May 5: 2024 World's Strongest Man in (United States) Myrtle Beach
- August 16–18: 2024 Shaw Classic in (United States) Loveland
- November 9: 2024 Rogue Invitational in (Scotland) Aberdeen
- November 17: 2024 Magnús Ver Magnússon Strongman Classic in Iceland

=== 2024 GIANTS LIVE:The World's Strongest Man Arena Tour ===
- January 27: Britain's Strongest Man 2024 in (England) Sheffield
  - Winner: (Scotland) Tom Stoltman
- April 13: Europe's Strongest Man 2024 in (England) Leeds
- June 22: England's Strongest Man 2024 in York
- July 13: The Strongman Classic 2024 in (England) London
- September 7: The Strongman Open & World Log Lift Challenge 2024 in (England) Birmingham
- September 28: The USA Strongman Championships & World Deadlift Championships 2024 in (United States) Las Vegas
- October 19: The World Tour Finals 2024 in (Scotland) Glasgow

=== 2024 Strongman Champions League ===
Date	Host city	Event	Winner	Runner-up	Third place
February 24–25	(Finland) Joensuu	2024 SCL Iceman	(Latvia) Aivars Šmaukstelis	(United States) Nick Wortham	(United Kingdom) Kane Francis
April 6–7	(Martinique) Fort-de-France	2024 SCL Martinique	(Canada) Tristain Hoath	(Netherlands) Kelvin de Ruiter	(Germany) Dennis Kohlruss
April 27	Hungary	2024 SCL Hungary	(Poland) Adam Roszkowski	(Canada) Frédérick Rhéaume	(Hungary) Péter Juhász
May 25	Serbia	2024 SCL Serbia			
June 22	Netherlands	2024 SCL Holland			
June 29–30	Finland	2024 SCL World Record Breakers			
July 20	Estonia	2024 SCL Estonia			
August 3	Portugal	2024 SCL Portugal			
August 16–19	Finland	2024 SCL World's Strongest Viking			
August 31	Poland	2024 SCL Poland			
September 14	Romania	2024 SCL Romania			
September 28	England	2024 SCL England			
October 12	Cyprus	2024 SCL Cyprus			
October 26	South Africa	2024 SCL Africa			
November 9/16	TBD	2024 SCL World Finals			

=== Other Strongman Competitions ===
Date	Host city	Event	Winner	Runner-up	Third place
January 21	(Australia) Molendinar	2024 Beasts of Burden	(New Zealand) Mathew Ragg	(Australia) Brenton Stone	(Australia) Eddie Williams
January 28	(United Arab Emirates) Dubai	2024 Middle East's Strongest Man	(Lebanon) Fadi El Masri	(Kenya) Stephen Wamalwa	(Nigeria) Jerome Pever
May 4	Hungary	2024 U90 & U105; Strongman European Championships			
May 12	(Russia) Krasnoyarsk	2024 Siberian Power Show			
June 8–9	Finland	2024 U90 & U105; Strongman World Championships			

== Tug of war ==
- Tug of war Events here.

=== World Championships ===
- February 8 – 11: 2024 TWIF Indoor World Championships in (Sweden) Helsingborg

  - Men's 560 kg winners: Northern Ireland
  - Men's 600 kg winners: Chinese Taipei
  - Men's 640 kg winners: Netherlands
  - Men's 680 kg winners: Netherlands
  - Women's 500 kg winners: Chinese Taipei
  - Women's 540 kg winners: China
  - Mixed 580 kg winners: Basque Country
  - Mixed 600 kg winners: China

- September 5 – 8: 2024 TWIF Outdoor World Championships in (Germany) Mannheim

=== Other Tournaments ===
- May 10 & 11: 2024 TTV Eibergen International Tournament in (Netherlands) Eibergen
- May 25 & 26: 2024 “Turan Cup” Indoor Tournament Baku in (Azerbaijan) Baku
- June 1 & 2: 2024 Int’l. Outdoor Tug Of War Tournament in (Republic of Ireland) Dublin
