= Tug of war at the World Games =

Tug of war was introduced as a World Games sport at the first World Games in 1981 World Games in Santa Clara. It has been played at all editions since then. Two teams, in a test of strength, pull on opposite ends of a rope. The goal is to bring the rope a certain distance in one direction against the force of the opposing team’s pull. Two teams of eight, whose total mass must not exceed a class maximum weight, align themselves at opposite ends of the rope. The teams start with the rope’s center-line directly above a line marked on the ground, and once the contest has commenced, attempt to pull the other team such that the marking on the rope closest to their opponent crosses the center-line.

== Men ==
=== -640 kg ===
Games	Gold	Silver	Bronze
1981 Santa Clara	England	SUI	NED
1985 London	IRL	SUI	England
1989 Karlsruhe	SUI	IRL	England
1993 The Hague	SUI	IRL	ESP
1997 Lahti	ESP	SUI	IRL
2005 Duisburg	SUI	SWE	GER
2009 Kaohsiung	SUI	GER	NED
2013 Cali	SUI	GBR	GER
2017 Wrocław	GBR	SUI	GER
2022 Birmingham	SUI	GBR	BEL

=== -680 kg ===
Games	Gold	Silver	Bronze
2001 Akita	NED	SUI	SWE
2005 Duisburg	NED	SWE	IRL
2009 Kaohsiung	NED	SUI	GBR

=== -700 kg ===
Games	Gold	Silver	Bronze
2013 Cali	NED	SUI	SWE
2017 Wrocław	SUI	NED	GBR

=== -720 kg ===
This is a discontinued event.

Games	Gold	Silver	Bronze
1981 Santa Clara	SUI	NED	England
1985 London	IRL	England	SUI
1989 Karlsruhe	England	SUI	IRL
1993 The Hague	SUI	IRL	GER
1997 Lahti	NED	SWE	IRL

=== Indoor -600 kg ===
This is a discontinued event.

Games	Gold	Silver	Bronze
2001 Akita	England	Scotland	JPN

== Women ==
=== Indoor -520 kg ===
Games	Gold	Silver	Bronze
2005 Duisburg	TPE	JPN	NED
2009 Kaohsiung	TPE	NED	GBR

=== Indoor -540 kg ===
Games	Gold	Silver	Bronze
2013 Cali	TPE	NED	RSA
2017 Wrocław	TPE	CHN	RSA
