= Casting at the 2001 World Games – Women's fly accuracy =

Casting women's fly accuracy at the 2001 World Games
- Venue: Akita Prefectural Central Park, Akita, Japan
- Date: 22–24 August 2001
- Competitors: 12 from 7 nations

Medalists
gold medal	(Germany) Jana Maisel
silver medal	(Austria) Alena Zinner
bronze medal	(Czech Republic) Zuzana Kočířová

The women's fly accuracy competition in casting at the 2001 World Games took place from 22 to 24 August 2001 at the Akita Prefectural Central Park in Akita, Japan.

== Competition format ==
A total of 12 athletes entered the competition. Best six athletes from preliminary round qualifies to the semifinal. From semifinal the best three athletes advances to the final.

== Results ==
=== Preliminary ===
			Round 1		Round 2		Note
Rank	Athlete	Nation	Score	Time	Score	Time	Note
1	Zuzana Kočířová	Czech Republic	100	3:33	100	3:19	Q
2	Jana Maisel	Germany	100	2:11	95	2:28	Q
3	Alena Zinner	Austria	90	3:23	100	3:14	Q
4	Ewa Wieczorek	Poland	100	3:47	90	4:02	Q
5	Renata Kuza	Poland	80	4:42	100	3:38	Q
6	Kathrin Ernst	Germany	90	2:18	85	2:12	Q
7	Tina Gerlach	Germany	80	2:47	95	2:49	
8	Hiroko Shirakawa	Japan	55	3:19	80	2:48	
9	Lise-Lotte Janson	Sweden	65	3:19	75	2:28	
10	Pamela Peters	United States	20	2:54	30	3:37	
11	Miki Koyama	Japan	10	4:04	25	4:06	
	Yuriko Mizumoto	Japan	DNS				

=== Semifinal ===
Rank	Athlete	Nation	Score	Time	Note
1	Alena Zinner	Austria	95	3:10	Q
2	Jana Maisel	Germany	90	2:15	Q
3	Zuzana Kočířová	Czech Republic	90	3:13	Q
4	Renata Kuza	Poland	90	3:34	
5	Kathrin Ernst	Germany	85	2:09	
6	Ewa Wieczorek	Poland	80	3:34	

=== Final ===
Rank	Athlete	Nation	Score	Time
1st place, gold medalist(s)	Jana Maisel	Germany	100	2:13
2nd place, silver medalist(s)	Alena Zinner	Austria	95	3:22
3rd place, bronze medalist(s)	Zuzana Kočířová	Czech Republic	90	3:08
