= Flying disc at the 2001 World Games – Women's disc golf =

Women's disc golf at the 2001 World Games
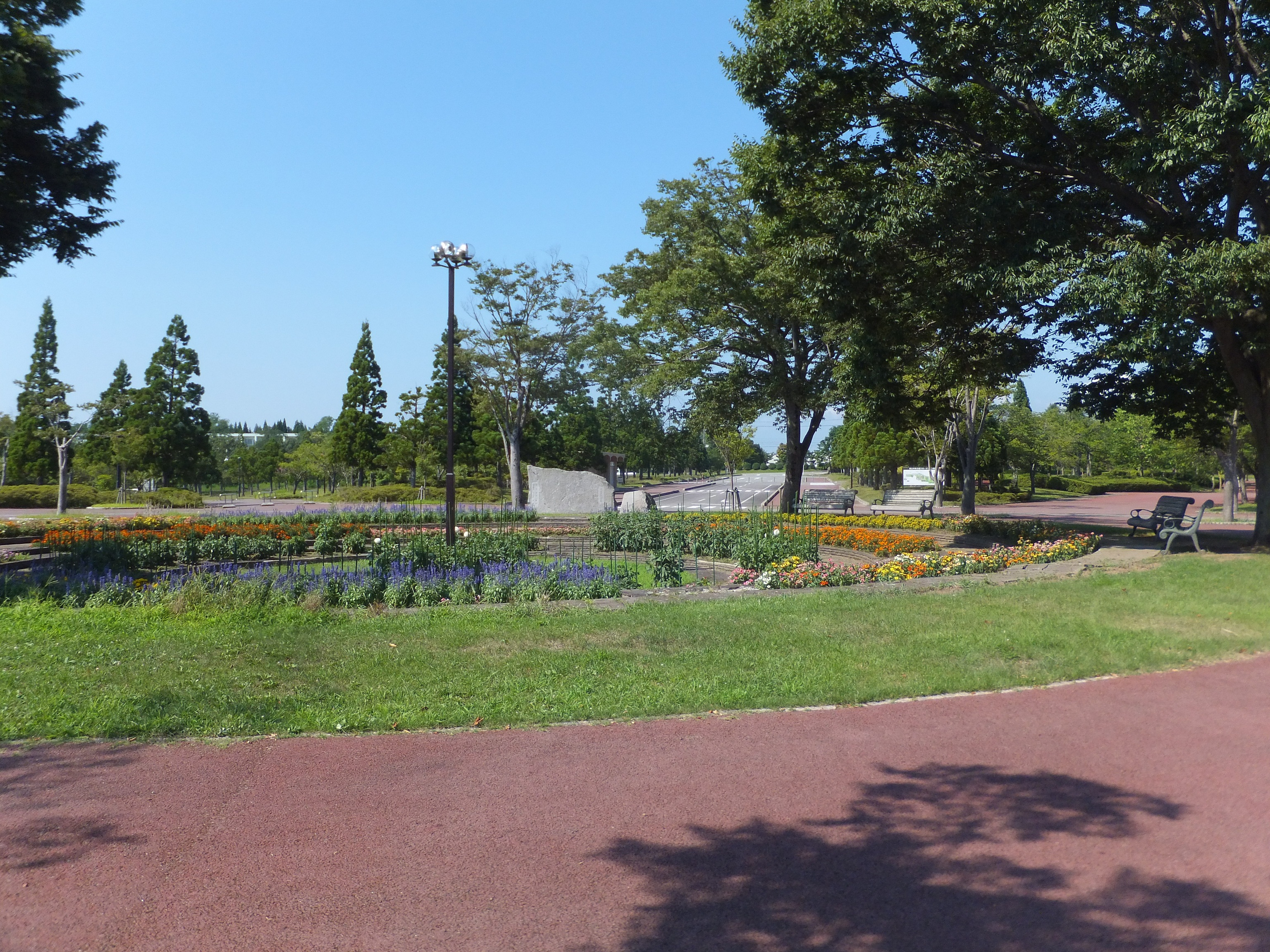
- Akita Prefectural Central Park
- Venue: Akita Prefectural Central Park Disc Golf Course
- Date: 17–18 August 2001
- Competitors: 6 from 6 nations

Medalists
1st place, gold medalist(s)		(United States) Juliana Korver
2nd place, silver medalist(s)		(Sweden) Niloofar Mosavar Rahmani
3rd place, bronze medalist(s)		(United Kingdom) Ruth Steele

The women's disc golf was one of the events in flying disc at the 2001 World Games in Akita. It was played from 17 to 18 August. The competition took place at Akita Prefectural Central Park Disc Golf Course.

== Competition format ==
A total of 6 athletes entered the competition. In preliminary stage they play round-robin tournament on 9 holes. Athletes on the first and second place advances to gold medal match. Athletes on the third and four place advances to bronze medal match. In final rounds athletes have to play 18 holes.

== Results ==
=== Preliminary stage ===
Rank	Athlete	M	W	D	L	WH	USA	SWE	CAN	GBR	NZL	JPN
1	Juliana Korver (USA)	5	4	1	0	16	x	3–1	1–1	5–1	5–1	5–0
2	Niloofar Mosavar Rahmani (SWE)	5	4	0	1	16	1–3	x	3–2	4–1	5–2	3–2
3	Elaine King (CAN)	5	2	2	1	13	1–1	2–3	x	2–2	2–1	6–0
4	Ruth Steele (GBR)	5	1	2	2	13	1–5	1–4	2–2	x	3–3	6–1
5	Rebecca Ward (NZL)	5	0	2	3	10	1–5	2–5	1–2	3–3	x	3–3
6	Naoko Inami (JPN)	5	0	1	4	6	0–5	2–3	0–6	1–6	3–3	x

=== Finals ===
Fifth place match

Hole	1	2	3	4	5	6	7	8	9	10	11	12	13	14	15	16	17	18	S1	S2	S3	Win	Loss	Even	Place
(New Zealand) Ward	W	D	D	L	W	L	L	W	L	L	L	D	W	D	W	W	W	D				7	6	4	5
(Japan) Inami	L	D	D	W	L	W	W	L	W	W	W	D	L	D	L	L	L	D				6	7	4	6

Third place match

Hole	1	2	3	4	5	6	7	8	9	10	11	12	13	14	15	16	17	18	S1	S2	S3	Win	Loss	Even	Place
(Canada) King	W	D	D	D	D	L	L	L	L	D	D	L	D	L								1	6	7	4
(United Kingdom) Steele	L	D	D	D	D	W	W	W	W	D	D	W	D	W								6	1	7	3rd place, bronze medalist(s)

Final

Hole	1	2	3	4	5	6	7	8	9	10	11	12	13	14	15	16	17	18	S1	S2	S3	Win	Loss	Even	Place
(United States) Korver	L	D	W	W	D	W	L	D	L	W	D	L	L	L	W	D	W	W				7	6	5	1st place, gold medalist(s)
(Sweden) Rahmani	W	D	L	L	D	L	W	D	W	L	D	W	W	W	L	D	L	L				6	7	5	2nd place, silver medalist(s)
