= Casting at the 2001 World Games – Women's fly distance single handed =

Casting women's fly distance single handed at the 2001 World Games
- Venue: Akita Prefectural Central Park, Akita, Japan
- Date: 22–24 August 2001
- Competitors: 12 from 7 nations

Medalists
gold medal	(Germany) Kathrin Ernst
silver medal	(Germany) Tina Gerlach
bronze medal	(Austria) Alena Zinner

The women's fly distance single handed competition in casting at the 2001 World Games took place from 22 to 24 August 2001 at the Akita Prefectural Central Park in Akita, Japan.

== Competition format ==
A total of 12 athletes entered the competition. Best six athletes from preliminary round qualifies to the semifinal. From semifinal the best three athletes advances to the final.

== Results ==
=== Preliminary ===
Rank	Athlete	Nation	Round 1	Round 2	Note
1	Jana Maisel	Germany	51.08	49.87	Q
2	Kathrin Ernst	Germany	50.54	47.44	Q
3	Tina Gerlach	Germany	49.34	47.44	Q
4	Alena Zinner	Austria	47.53	42.71	Q
5	Lise-Lotte Janson	Sweden	46.24	44.47	Q
6	Renata Kuza	Poland	47.20	43.14	Q
7	Zuzana Kočířová	Czech Republic	45.21	40.73	
8	Ewa Wieczorek	Poland	39.58	38.89	
9	Yuriko Mizumoto	Japan	39.75	34.45	
10	Pamela Peters	United States	37.93	38.00	
11	Miki Koyama	Japan	38.12	35.48	
12	Hiroko Shirakawa	Japan	31.85	32.99	

=== Semifinal ===
Rank	Athlete	Nation	Distance	Note
1	Kathrin Ernst	Germany	48.03	Q
2	Alena Zinner	Austria	46.94	Q
3	Tina Gerlach	Germany	45.62	Q
4	Jana Maisel	Germany	44.63	
5	Renata Kuza	Poland	43.21	
6	Lise-Lotte Janson	Sweden	41.91	

=== Final ===
Rank	Athlete	Nation	Distance
1st place, gold medalist(s)	Kathrin Ernst	Germany	51.92
2nd place, silver medalist(s)	Tina Gerlach	Germany	47.19
3rd place, bronze medalist(s)	Alena Zinner	Austria	46.94
