= Casting at the 2001 World Games – Men's fly distance single handed =

Casting men's fly distance single handed at the 2001 World Games
- Venue: Akita Prefectural Central Park, Akita, Japan
- Date: 22–24 August 2001
- Competitors: 36 from 12 nations

Medalists
gold medal	(Poland) Jacek Kuza
silver medal	(Czech Republic) Jan Luxa
bronze medal	(Sweden) Henrik Österberg

The men's fly distance single handed competition in casting at the 2001 World Games took place from 22 to 24 August 2001 at the Akita Prefectural Central Park in Akita, Japan.

== Competition format ==
A total of 36 athletes entered the competition. Best nine athletes from preliminary round qualifies to the semifinal. From semifinal the best three athletes advances to the final.

== Results ==
=== Preliminary ===
Rank	Athlete	Nation	Round 1	Round 2	Note
1	Henrik Österberg	Sweden	60.45	60.80	Q
2	Jacek Kuza	Poland	61.60	60.74	Q
3	Ralf Stein	Germany	65.17	58.51	Q
4	Michael Harter	Germany	59.55	60.34	Q
5	Włodzimierz Targosz	Poland	57.97	61.14	Q
6	Jan Meszaros	Slovakia	58.55	59.76	Q
7	Robert Meszaros	Slovakia	58.71	58.90	Q
8	Jan Luxa	Czech Republic	64.54	55.45	Q
9	Jurej Meszaros	Slovakia	59.68	54.35	Q
10	Heinz Maire-Hensge	Germany	58.16	56.36	
11	Patrik Lexa	Czech Republic	55.14	58.18	
12	Steve Rajeff	United States	59.14	53.52	
13	Bjørn Larsen	Norway	55.55	56.13	
14	Klaus-Jurgen Bruder	Germany	58.17	53.41	
15	Josef Luxa	Czech Republic	54.25	55.80	
16	Kazumi Fukai	Japan	55.85	54.25	
17	Tomáš Lexa	Czech Republic	50.71	57.18	
18	Sadaki Sato	Japan	53.29	54.88	
19	Karol Michalik	Slovakia	57.18	52.40	
20	Marijonas Svirbutavičius	Lithuania	54.56	53.31	
21	Hendrik Papenfuss	South Africa	49.24	57.78	
22	Gerhard Pirklbauer	Austria	50.23	54.44	
23	Harald Meindl	Austria	52.19	52.93	
24	Frode Semb	Norway	51.17	52.87	
25	Chris Korich	United States	48.61	54.00	
26	Justas Barauskas	Lithuania	51.96	47.60	
27	Mitsuru Ashida	Japan	50.46	47.61	
28	Tairiku Shirasawa	Japan	50.16	48.24	
29	Henrik Harjanne	Sweden	49.87	50.10	
30	Helmut Hochwartner	Austria	50.09	48.59	
31	Yuji Tsukahara	Japan	48.35	51.03	
32	Markus Kläusler	Switzerland	49.65	48.43	
33	Masayuki Ono	Japan	50.13	45.96	
34	Kenji Okamoto	Japan	47.40	45.26	
35	Werner Gattermaier	Austria	45.18	45.58	
	Kuniyasu Tanaka	Japan	DNS		

=== Semifinal ===
Rank	Athlete	Nation	Distance	Note
1	Henrik Österberg	Sweden	60.60	Q
2	Jan Luxa	Czech Republic	58.38	Q
3	Jacek Kuza	Poland	58.33	Q
4	Robert Meszaros	Slovakia	57.03	
5	Jan Meszaros	Slovakia	56.96	
6	Włodzimierz Targosz	Poland	56.17	
7	Ralf Stein	Germany	56.04	
8	Jurej Meszaros	Slovakia	53.70	
9	Michael Harter	Germany	53.24	

=== Final ===
Rank	Athlete	Nation	Distance
1st place, gold medalist(s)	Jacek Kuza	Poland	61.29
2nd place, silver medalist(s)	Jan Luxa	Czech Republic	60.40
3rd place, bronze medalist(s)	Henrik Österberg	Sweden	59.97
