= Flying disc at the 2001 World Games – Ultimate =

Ultimate frisbee at the 2001 World Games
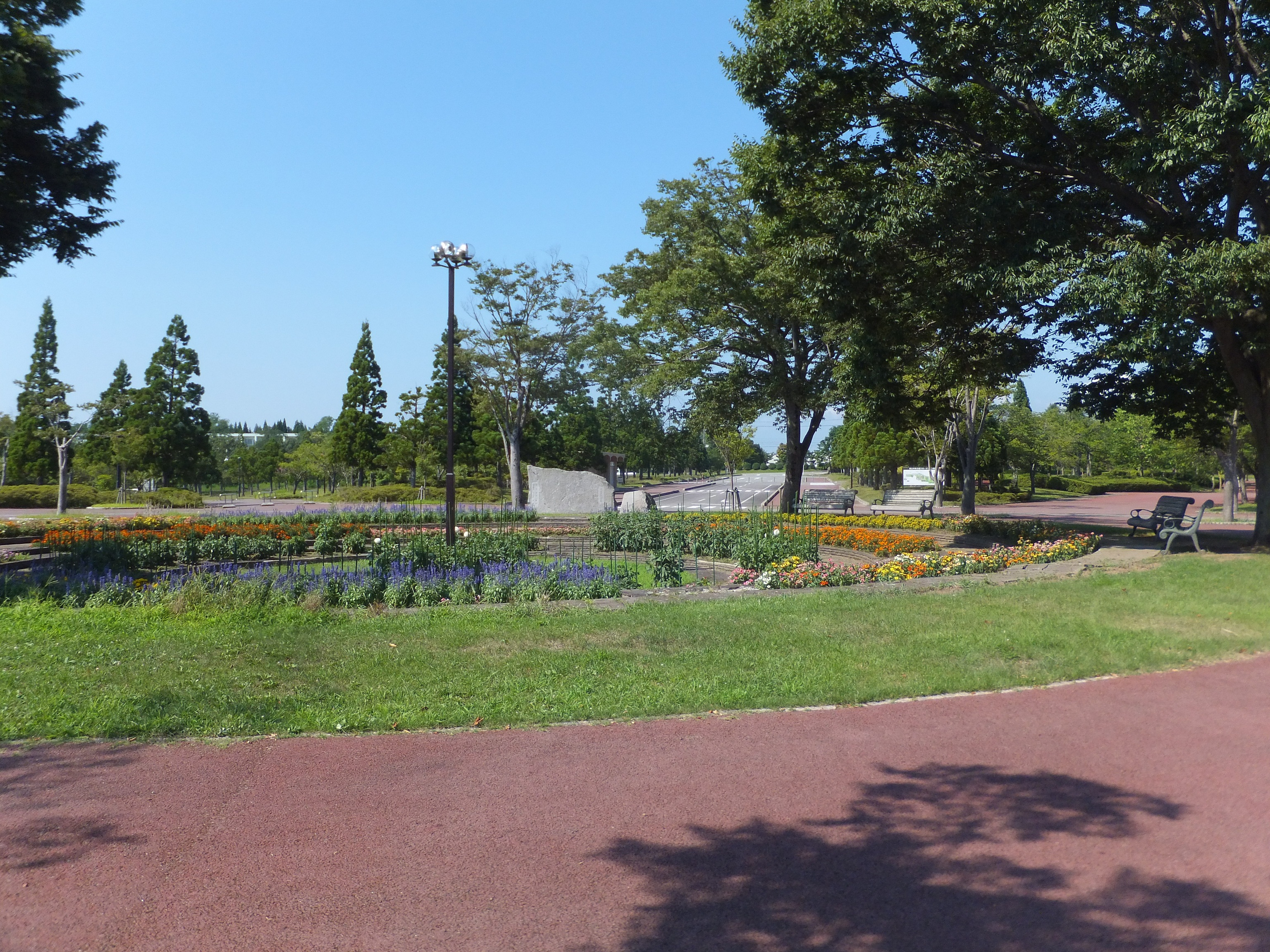
- Akita Prefectural Central Park
- Venue: Akita Prefectural Central Park Football Studiume
- Date: 19–21 August 2001
- Competitors: 60 from 6 nations

Medalists
1st place, gold medalist(s)		Canada
2nd place, silver medalist(s)		United States
3rd place, bronze medalist(s)		Japan

Ultimate was one of the events in flying disc at the 2001 World Games in Akita. It was played from 19 to 21 August. The competition took place at Akita Prefectural Central Park Football Studiume.

== Competition format ==
A total of 6 teams entered the competition. In preliminary stage they play round-robin tournament. The best four teams advances to the semifinals.

== Results ==
=== Preliminary stage ===
Rank	Team	M	W	D	L	PO	Net	CAN	USA	JPN	SWE	FIN	GER
1	Canada	5	5	0	0	96–66	+30	x	16–14	16–13	20–8	25–11	19–14
2	United States	5	4	0	1	83–63	+20	14–16	x	19–9	15–14	15–13	20–11
3	Japan	5	3	0	2	76–71	+5	13–16	9–19	x	18–11	19–11	17–14
4	Sweden	5	1	1	3	79–87	–8	8–20	14–15	11–18	x	18–18	22–16
5	Finland	5	1	1	3	71–88	–17	11–25	13–15	11–19	18–18	x	18–11
6	Germany	5	0	0	5	66–96	–30	14–19	11–20	14–17	16–22	11–18	x

=== Semifinals ===
21 August 2001	Canada	18–10	Sweden	Akita Prefectural Central Park Football Studiume, Akita
21 August 2001		(9–5)		Akita Prefectural Central Park Football Studiume, Akita

21 August 2001	United States	15–12	Japan	Akita Prefectural Central Park Football Studiume, Akita
21 August 2001		(9–6)		Akita Prefectural Central Park Football Studiume, Akita

=== Fifth place match ===
21 August 2001	Finland	19–13	Germany	Akita Prefectural Central Park Football Studiume, Akita
21 August 2001		(9–7)		Akita Prefectural Central Park Football Studiume, Akita

=== Bronze medal match ===
21 August 2001	Sweden	13–19	Japan	Akita Prefectural Central Park Football Studiume, Akita
21 August 2001		(6–10)		Akita Prefectural Central Park Football Studiume, Akita

=== Gold medal match ===
21 August 2001	Canada	18–17	United States	Akita Prefectural Central Park Football Studiume, Akita
21 August 2001		(9–9)		Akita Prefectural Central Park Football Studiume, Akita

== Final ranking ==
Rank	Team
Gold medal	Canada
Silver medal	United States
Bronze medal	Japan
4	Sweden
5	Finland
6	Germany
