= Casting at the 2001 World Games – Women's multiplier accuracy =

Casting women's multiplier accuracy at the 2001 World Games
- Venue: Akita Prefectural Central Park, Akita, Japan
- Date: 22–24 August 2001
- Competitors: 8 from 5 nations

Medalists
| gold medal | (Germany) Jana Maisel |
| silver medal | (Germany) Tina Gerlach |
| bronze medal | (Germany) Kathrin Ernst |

The women's multiplier accuracy competition in casting at the 2001 World Games took place from 22 to 24 August 2001 at the Akita Prefectural Central Park in Akita, Japan.

== Competition format ==
A total of 8 athletes entered the competition. Best six athletes from preliminary round qualifies to the semifinal. From semifinal the best three athletes advances to the final.

== Results ==
=== Preliminary ===
| | | | Round 1 | | Round 2 | | Note |
| Rank | Athlete | Nation | Score | Time | Score | Time | Note |
|---|---|---|---|---|---|---|---|
| 1 | Jana Maisel | Germany | 85 | 5:03 | 95 | 5:05 | Q |
| 2 | Kathrin Ernst | Germany | 85 | 6:01 | 80 | 6:01 | Q |
| 3 | Tina Gerlach | Germany | 80 | 6:21 | 90 | 6:23 | Q |
| 4 | Zuzana Kočířová | Czech Republic | 70 | 6:42 | 60 | 7:18 | Q |
| 5 | Renata Kuza | Poland | 30 | 9:17 | 60 | 7:07 | Q |
| 6 | Pamela Peters | United States | 50 | 5:59 | 35 | 6:26 | Q |
| 7 | Ewa Wieczorek | Poland | 45 | 7:03 | 50 | 7:39 | |
| 8 | Hiroko Shirakawa | Japan | 25 | 6:32 | 30 | 7:44 | |

=== Semifinal ===
| Rank | Athlete | Nation | Score | Time | Note |
|---|---|---|---|---|---|
| 1 | Tina Gerlach | Germany | 90 | 6:24 | Q |
| 2 | Jana Maisel | Germany | 85 | 5:04 | Q |
| 3 | Kathrin Ernst | Germany | 75 | 5:58 | Q |
| 4 | Zuzana Kočířová | Czech Republic | 75 | 6:05 | |
| 5 | Pamela Peters | United States | 60 | 6:01 | |
| 6 | Renata Kuza | Poland | 40 | 9:39 | |

=== Final ===
| Rank | Athlete | Nation | Score | Time |
|---|---|---|---|---|
| 1st place, gold medalist(s) | Jana Maisel | Germany | 95 | 4:57 |
| 2nd place, silver medalist(s) | Tina Gerlach | Germany | 85 | 5:59 |
| 3rd place, bronze medalist(s) | Kathrin Ernst | Germany | 70 | 6:01 |
