= Casting at the 2001 World Games – Men's fly accuracy =

Casting men's fly accuracy at the 2001 World Games
- Venue: Akita Prefectural Central Park, Akita, Japan
- Date: 22–24 August 2001
- Competitors: 36 from 12 nations

Medalists
gold medal	(Sweden) Henrik Österberg
silver medal	(Sweden) Henrik Harjanne
bronze medal	(Czech Republic) Jan Luxa

The men's fly accuracy competition in casting at the 2001 World Games took place from 22 to 24 August 2001 at the Akita Prefectural Central Park in Akita, Japan.

== Competition format ==
A total of 36 athletes entered the competition. Best nine athletes from preliminary round qualifies to the semifinal. From semifinal the best three athletes advances to the final.

== Results ==
=== Preliminary ===
			Round 1		Round 2		Note
Rank	Athlete	Nation	Score	Time	Score	Time	Note
1	Ralf Stein	Germany	100	3:33	100	3:21	Q
2	Henrik Harjanne	Sweden	95	1:15	95	1:18	Q
3	Henrik Österberg	Sweden	95	2:08	95	1:45	Q
4	Kazumi Fukai	Japan	85	1:17	100	1:11	Q
5	Marijonas Svirbutavičius	Lithuania	90	3:33	100	3:07	Q
6	Heinz Maire-Hensge	Germany	95	2:27	95	1:59	Q
7	Jan Luxa	Czech Republic	100	2:39	90	2:31	Q
8	Frode Semb	Norway	90	4:19	95	1:07	Q
9	Kenji Okamoto	Japan	85	1:41	95	1:05	Q
10	Harald Meindl	Austria	90	2:48	95	2:52	
11	Josef Luxa	Czech Republic	90	2:22	90	2:06	
12	Yuji Tsukahara	Japan	80	2:26	100	2:07	
13	Włodzimierz Targosz	Poland	85	2:49	95	1:44	
14	Patrik Lexa	Czech Republic	80	3:17	100	1:38	
15	Mitsuru Ashida	Japan	95	2:14	85	2:00	
16	Jacek Kuza	Poland	100	4:11	80	4:37	
17	Karol Michalik	Slovakia	90	3:20	90	3:08	
18	Werner Gattermaier	Austria	85	2:52	95	2:01	
19	Steve Rajeff	United States	70	2:58	100	2:23	
20	Masayuki Ono	Japan	90	2:24	75	2:01	
21	Markus Kläusler	Switzerland	90	3:27	80	1:54	
22	Tairiku Shirasawa	Japan	80	1:58	90	1:17	
23	Michael Harter	Germany	85	3:41	90	2:21	
24	Tomáš Lexa	Czech Republic	75	2:54	95	1:47	
25	Hendrik Papenfuss	South Africa	75	2:46	95	2:59	
26	Klaus-Jurgen Bruder	Germany	85	3:16	85	2:40	
27	Gerhard Pirklbauer	Austria	80	2:13	85	2:03	
28	Chris Korich	United States	90	4:23	65	2:10	
29	Jurej Meszaros	Slovakia	85	4:21	80	4:20	
30	Justas Barauskas	Lithuania	55	3:42	95	3:07	
31	Bjørn Larsen	Norway	80	2:41	85	2:16	
32	Helmut Hochwartner	Austria	75	2:51	75	2:51	
33	Robert Meszaros	Slovakia	70	4:22	65	1:58	
34	Jan Meszaros	Slovakia	65	4:26	70	2:34	
	Kuniyasu Tanaka	Japan	DNS				
	Sadaki Sato	Japan	DNS				

=== Semifinal ===
Rank	Athlete	Nation	Score	Time	Note
1	Henrik Harjanne	Sweden	100	0:59	Q
2	Henrik Österberg	Sweden	100	1:56	Q
3	Jan Luxa	Czech Republic	100	2:24	Q
4	Marijonas Svirbutavičius	Lithuania	95	2:37	
5	Frode Semb	Norway	90	1:11	
6	Kazumi Fukai	Japan	85	1:02	
7	Ralf Stein	Germany	85	2:17	
8	Kenji Okamoto	Japan	80	1:02	
9	Heinz Maire-Hensge	Germany	80	1:38	

=== Final ===
Rank	Athlete	Nation	Score	Time
1st place, gold medalist(s)	Henrik Österberg	Sweden	100	1:39
2nd place, silver medalist(s)	Henrik Harjanne	Sweden	95	1:10
3rd place, bronze medalist(s)	Jan Luxa	Czech Republic	90	2:18
