= South African Tug of War Federation =

Sports governing body in South Africa

- Sport: Tug of War
- Abbreviation: SATF
- Founded: 1970
- Affiliation: Tug of War International Federation
- Headquarters: Claremont, Cape Town
- Location: Keurboom Close Ramelagh Road Claremont
- President: Anton Rabe
- Secretary: Kobie Phillips

Official website
- www.satugofwar.co.za
- (South Africa)

The South African Tug of War Federation (SATF) also known as the South African Tug-of-War Federation is the national governing body for the development and promotion of the sport of Tug of War (Afrikaans: Toutrek) in the Republic of South Africa. SATF is based in Claremont, Cape Town. The Federation is a member of the Tug of War International Federation (TWIF). SATF is also an affiliate of the South African Sports Confederation and Olympic Committee (SASCOC), which, alongside Sport and Recreation South Africa (SRSA) supervises all organised sport in South Africa.

Men's and Women's teams from South Africa participate in the Tug of War International Federation World Outdoor Championships. In 2017, South Africa won gold in the women's junior 480 kg competition, and the under-23 women's team finished sixth in the 500 kg category. The junior men's team won silver in the 560 kg competition, behind Switzerland and bronze in the under-23 men's category. 300 South African teams contest for honours at the Youth Championships annually. 77 teams participated at the 2017 SATF Prestige Competition. In the World Games, the women's team won bronze medals in the Indoor 540 kg competition at both the 2013 and 2017 editions.

== History ==
South African Tug of War Federation (formerly South African Tug of War Association) was founded in 1970, and celebrated its 40 years of establishment in 2010 during its hosting of the 2010 Outdoor World Championships which coincided with the 50th anniversary of the world governing body Tug of War International Federation (TWIF).

== See also ==
- Sport in South Africa
- Tug of war at the World Games
