= Flying disc at the 2001 World Games – Men's disc golf =

Men's disc golf at the 2001 World Games
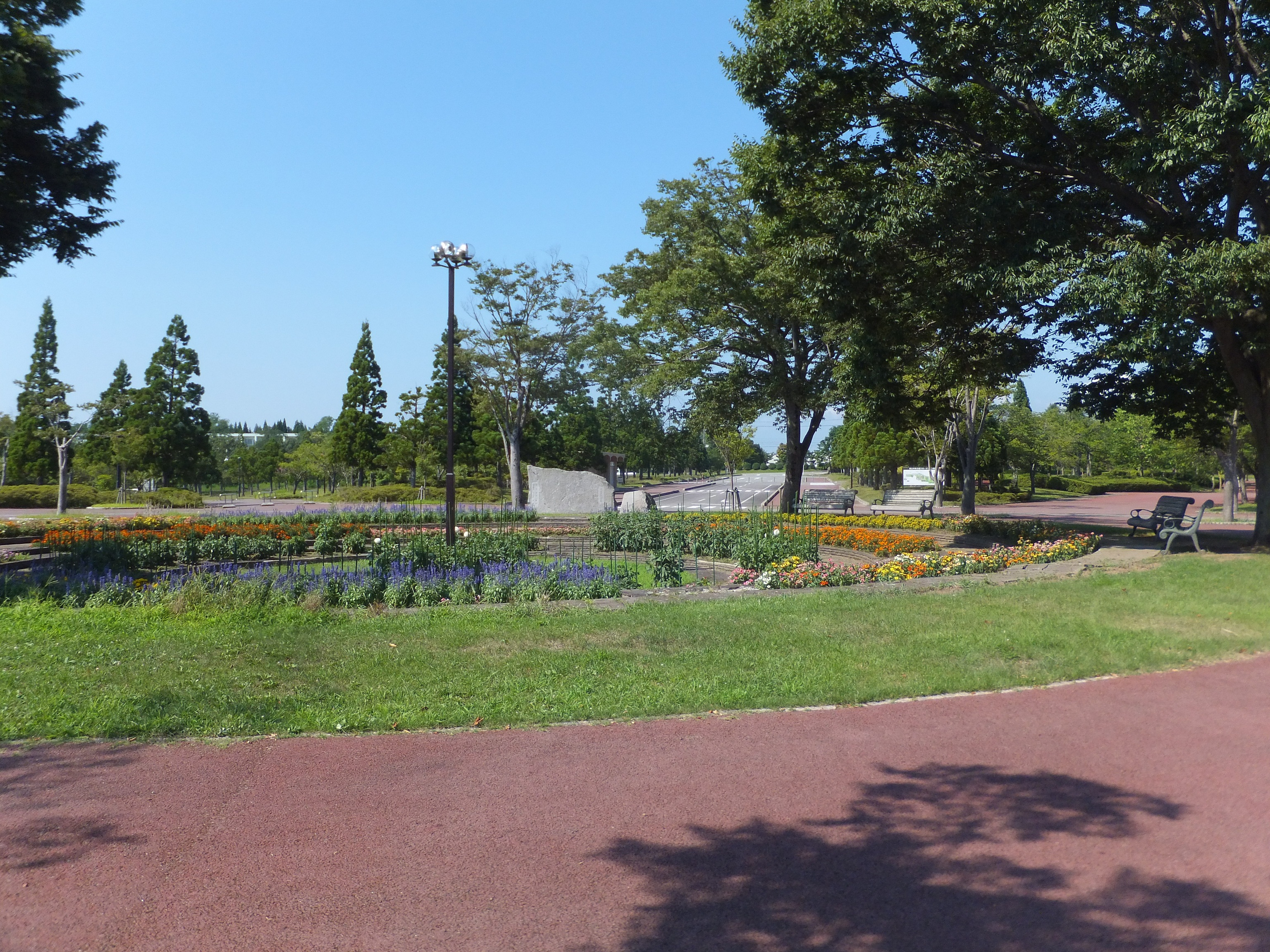
- Akita Prefectural Central Park
- Venue: Akita Prefectural Central Park Disc Golf Course
- Date: 17–18 August 2001
- Competitors: 6 from 6 nations

Medalists
1st place, gold medalist(s)		(United States) Barry Schultz
2nd place, silver medalist(s)		(Canada) Michael Sullivan
3rd place, bronze medalist(s)		(Sweden) Jesper Lundmark

The men's disc golf was one of the events in flying disc at the 2001 World Games in Akita. It was played from 17 to 18 August. The competition took place at Akita Prefectural Central Park Disc Golf Course.

== Competition format ==
A total of 6 athletes entered the competition. In preliminary stage they play round-robin tournament on 9 holes. Athletes on the first and second place advances to gold medal match. Athletes on the third and four place advances to bronze medal match. In final rounds athletes have to play 18 holes.

== Results ==
=== Preliminary stage ===
Rank	Athlete	M	W	L	WH	USA	CAN	JPN	SWE	NZL	GBR
1	Barry Schultz (USA)	5	4	1	18	x	4–3	3–2	1–4	4–1	6–1
2	Michael Sullivan (CAN)	5	3	2	21	3–4	x	3–1	2–1	3–5	6–2
3	Yusaku Yoshino (JPN)	5	3	2	15	2–3	1–3	x	3–2	6–2	3–2
4	Jesper Lundmark (SWE)	5	3	2	18	4–1	1–2	2–3	x	3–2	8–0
5	Simon Feasey (NZL)	5	2	3	13	1–4	5–3	2–6	2–3	x	3–1
6	Derek Robins (GBR)	5	0	5	6	1–6	2–6	2–3	0–8	1–3	x

=== Finals ===
Fifth place match

Hole	1	2	3	4	5	6	7	8	9	10	11	12	13	14	15	16	17	18	S1	S2	S3	S4	Win	Loss	Even	Place
(New Zealand) Feasey	L	W	D	L	D	W	W	W	W	L	L	L	W	W	W	D							8	5	2	5
(United Kingdom) Robins	W	L	D	W	D	L	L	L	L	W	W	W	L	L	L	D							5	8	2	6

Third place match

Hole	1	2	3	4	5	6	7	8	9	10	11	12	13	14	15	16	17	18	S1	S2	S3	S4	Win	Loss	Even	Place
(Japan) Yoshino	L	W	L	L	D	W	W	D	D	D	D	D	L	D	D	D	D	W	D	D	D	L	4	5	13	4
(Sweden) Lundmark	W	L	W	W	D	L	L	D	D	D	D	D	W	D	D	D	D	L	D	D	D	W	5	4	13	3rd place, bronze medalist(s)

Final

Hole	1	2	3	4	5	6	7	8	9	10	11	12	13	14	15	16	17	18	S1	S2	S3	S4	Win	Loss	Even	Place
(United States) Schultz	W	L	D	W	L	W	W	W	D	W	D	D	D	D	D								6	2	7	1st place, gold medalist(s)
(Canada) Sullivan	L	W	D	L	W	L	L	L	D	L	D	D	D	D	D								2	6	7	2nd place, silver medalist(s)
