= Tug of War International Federation =

International governing body for the sport of tug of war

- Tug of War International Federation Logo
- Formation: 1960
- Type: Sport
- Headquarters: Jellum, Netherlands
- Members: 75 countries
- President: Dan McCarthy (Cork, Ireland)
- Website: tugofwar-twif.org

The Tug of War International Federation (TWIF) is the international governing body for the sport of tug of war.

== Members ==
=== Regions ===
1. Asia: 22
2. Oceania: 1
3. Africa: 12
4. Americas:
5. Europe:

=== Member countries ===
Due to national organization and historical rivalry, certain countries are listed below as individuals, rather than as members of a larger political union. For example, the Home Countries compete as separate nations, and the Basque Country has its own team.

Country	Member name	Ref
Australia	Australian Tug of War Association	
Azerbaijan	Azerbaijan Tug of War Sports Society Public Association	
Basque Country		
Belgium	Belgische Touwtrek Bond	
Brazil	Brazil Tug of War Association	
Brunei Darussalam		
Cambodia		
Cameroon	Tug of War Cameroonian Federation	
Canada	Canadian Tug of War Association	
(Guernsey) Channel Islands		
China	Chinese Tug of War Association	
Chinese Taipei	Chinese Taipei Tug of War Association	
Colombia		
Democratic Republic of Congo	TUG OF WAR DRC COD	
Czech Republic	Czech Republic Tug of War Association	
Denmark		
Dominican Republic	Dominican Republic Tug of War Association	
England	English Tug of War Association	
Estonia		
Finland		
France	French Tug of War Association	
Gambia		
Georgia		
Germany	Deutscher Rasenkraftsport- und Tauzieh-Verband	
Ghana	Ghana Tug of War Association	
Greece	Hellenic Tug of War Federation	
Haiti		
Hong Kong		
Hungary	Hungarian Tug of War Association	
India	Tug of War Federation of India	
Iran	Iran Tug of War Association	
Ireland	Irish Tug of War Association	
Israel	Israel Tug of War Association	
Italy	Federazione Italiana Sport del Tiro alla Fune	
Japan	Japan Tug of War Federation	
Kenya	Kenya Tug of War Association	
Korea	Korean Tug of War Association	
Kyrgyzstan		
Laos		
Latvia	Latvian Tug of War Association	
Lithuania		
Macau	Tug of War General Association Macao, China	
Malaysia		
Malta	Malta tug of war Association	
Mauritius		
Mongolia		
Morocco		
Myanmar		
Namibia	Namibia Tug of War Association	
Nepal	Nepal Tug of War Association	
Netherlands	Nederlandse Touwtrek Bond	
Nigeria	Tug of War Association of Nigeria	
Northern Ireland	Northern Ireland Tug of War Association	
Pakistan	Pakistan Tug of War Federation	
Philippines	Philippines Tug of War Association	
Poland		
Romania		
Russia		
Scotland	Scottish Tug of War Association	
Serbia		
Sierra Leone	Sierra Leone Tug of War Association	
Singapore		
Slovakia		
South Africa	South African Tug of War Federation	
Sri Lanka		
Sweden	Svenska Dragkampforbundet	
Switzerland	Schweizer Tauziehverband	
Thailand	Tug of War Thailand Association	
Turkey	Turkish Traditional Sports Federation	
Ukraine		
US	US Amateur Tug of War Association, Inc	
Vietnam		
Wales	Welsh Tug of War Association	
Zambia		
Zimbabwe	Zimbabwe Tug of War Association	

== Competitions ==
TWIF organizes world championships for national teams, U23 and club competition. Those are:

- TWIF Outdoor World Championships (biennially, even years)
- TWIF Indoor World Championships (biennially, even years)
- TWIF Outdoor Clubs Championships (biennially, even years)
- TWIF Indoor Clubs Championships (biennially, even years)
- TWIF Outdoor Junior Championships
- TWIF Indoor Junior Championships
- TWIF Outdoor U23 Championships
- TWIF Indoor U23 Championships

Since the first Baltic Games in 1964, the TWIF has organized the following competitions:

- Since 1965: European Outdoor Championships (every two years)
- Since 1975: World Outdoor Championships (every two years since 1986)
- Since 1981: World Games – Tug of War (every four years)
- Since 1991: World Indoor Championships (every two years)

=== European Tug of War Federation (ETWF) ===
On August 12, 2021, the European Tug of War Federation (ETWF), based in Sweden, was founded by several European federations at the headquarters of the Polish Tug of War Federation. Its goals include improving communication between tug-of-war nations in Europe, introducing new disciplines such as beach tug-of-war and individual tug-of-war, which already exist in Sweden, and advancing the goal of returning tug-of-war to the Olympics.

Currently (as of September 1, 2024), the following 15 nations are members of the ETWF: Ireland, Azerbaijan, Belgium, the Czech Republic, Germany, Israel, Latvia, Lithuania, the Netherlands, Poland, Russia, Serbia, Sweden, Turkey and Ukraine.

=== Asian Tug of War Federation (ATWF) ===
14th Asian Indoor Tug of War Championships was held in Thailand at 2019.

== See also ==
- Tug of war at the Summer Olympics
- Tug of war at the World Games
- Association of IOC Recognised International Sports Federations
