= Tug of War Federation of India =

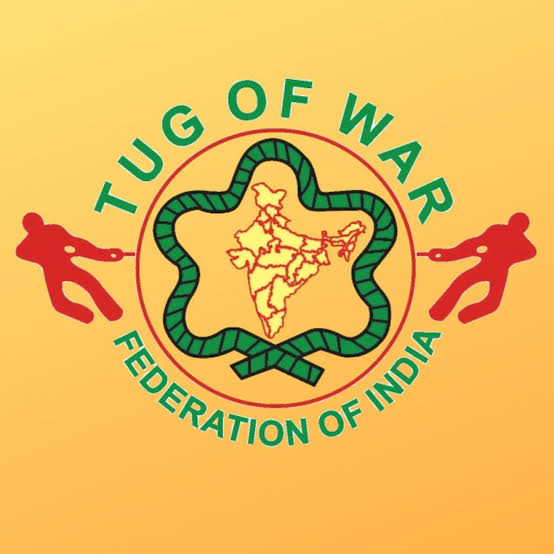
- Sport: Tug of war
- Jurisdiction: India
- Abbreviation: TWFI
- Founded: 1958; 67 years ago
- Affiliation: Tug of War International Federation
- Affiliation date: 1978
- Regional affiliation: Asian Tug of War Federation
- Affiliation date: August 2008
- Headquarters: Delhi Chamber Building, Delhi Gate, Asaf Ali Road, New Delhi
- President: Hari Shanker Gupta
- Secretary: Madan Mohan

Official website
- www.tugofwarindia.in
- (India)

The Tug of War Federation of India (TWFI) is the governing body for tug of war in India. The TWFI was founded by some Indian Armed Forces officers in Ghaziabad, Uttar Pradesh in 1958. The TWFI applied for and received affiliation from the Tug of War International Federation in 1978. The TWFI faced financial issues by 1980, and in the same year, requested that its management be taken over by a Delhi-based sports group. The Federation's new administrative committee was headed by Gautam Kaul (Asiad Jyoti Awardee of the 1982 Asian Games), Hari Shankar Gupta (a youth leader in Delhi) and Madan Mohan (National Youth Awardee). The new management restructured the TWFI and registered it as a society under the Societies Registration Act, 1860 in 1982.

The Indian Railways recognized the TWFI as a national sports federation in September 1999, providing a 75% fare concession to the officials and players of the Federation traveling to tug of war events in India. The TWFI was recognized by the Indian Olympic Association on 23 July 2008.

The TWFI received affiliation from the Asian Tug of War Federation in August 2008. The TWFI has been a full member of the South Asian Tug of War Federation since 2000.

The TWFI had a budget of ₹40 lakh (US$46,000) for expenses in the 2017-18 fiscal year.

== Overseas ==
The TWFI is active in attempting to spread the sport of tug of war in neighbouring countries. The TWFI helped introduce tug of war in Sri Lanka and Nepal, and also helped establish national federations in those nations. The TWFI is also helping Bangladesh establish a national federation. The TWFI is also in the initial stages of establishing federations in The Maldives Republic, Afghanistan, Iran and Bhutan.
