= Tug of war at the 2001 World Games =

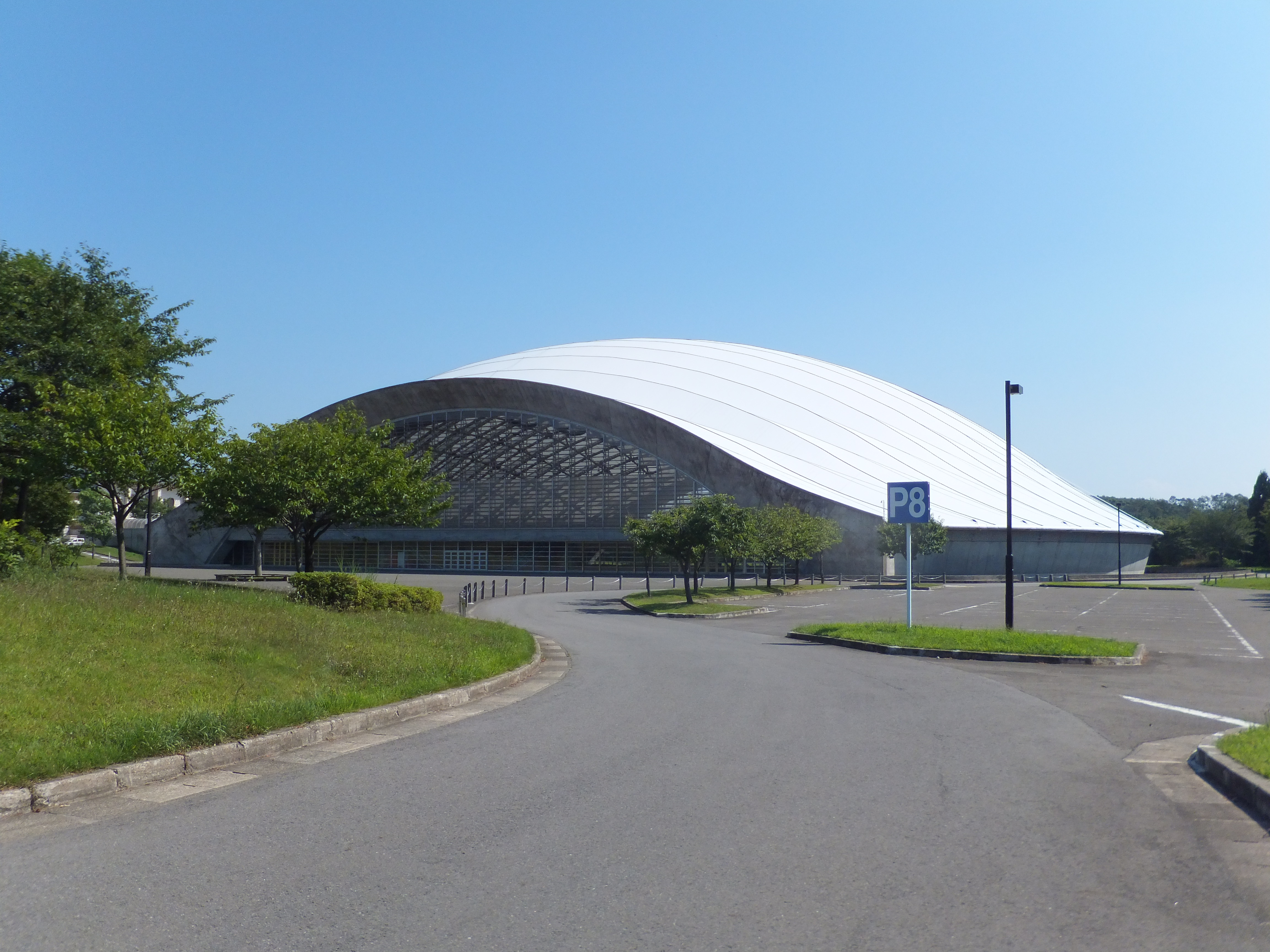
- Akita Skydome
- Venue: Akita Skydome
- Dates: 20–21 August 2001
- Competitors: from 12 nations

The tug of war events at the 2001 World Games in Akita was played between 20 and 21 August. Athletes from 12 nations participated in the tournament. The competition took place at Akita Skydome in Yūwa. Two men's events were held as official sport. Two women's events were invitational sport at this games.

== Participating nations ==
- Australia
- Chinese Taipei
- Germany
- Great Britain
- Ireland
- Japan
- Netherlands
- South Africa
- Spain
- Sweden
- Switzerland
- United States

== Medal table ==
=== Official events ===
Rank	Nation	Gold	Silver	Bronze	Total
1	Great Britain	1	1	0	2
2	Netherlands	1	0	0	1
3	Switzerland	0	1	0	1
4	Japan	0	0	1	1
4	Sweden	0	0	1	1
Totals (5 entries)		2	2	2	6

=== Invitational events ===
Rank	Nation	Gold	Silver	Bronze	Total
1	Netherlands	1	0	1	2
2	Spain	1	0	0	1
3	Japan	0	2	0	2
4	United States	0	0	1	1
Totals (4 entries)		2	2	2	6

== Events ==
=== Men's events ===
Event	Gold	Silver	Bronze
Indoor 600 kg	Great Britain (England); Neil Alcock; Shaun Alcock; Ian Daniels; Carl Davies; David Field; Tony Hadley; Jonathan Jones; Duane Meadowcroft; Phil Paddock; Kirk Scott; Robert Steele	Great Britain (Scotland); Alan Brodie; Larry Dunlop; Stephen Garner; Gary Gillespie; Graeme Hendry; Neil MacFarlane; Thomas Nelson; Robert Patterson; Gordon Sang; Robert Warnock; Tom Weir	Japan; Takashi Chiwaki; Yutaka Ishiyama; Mitsuru Kobayashi; Hideaki Morozumi; Akihiko Nakamura; Masahiro Osada; Tatsuo Saito; Humiaki Sato; Osamu Suzuki; Yoshihiro Takeuchi; Yoshika Yamaki
Outdoor 680 kg	Netherlands; Ivo Brugman; Jan Groot Wassink; Gerben Jansen; Henk Lammers; Erwin Leusink; Marcel Leusink; Wim Mateman; Peter Naalden; Erik Scharenborg; Arnold Veltkamp	Switzerland; Walter Bernhard; Daniel Christen; Peter Christen; Ueli Christen; Patrick Emmenegger; Albert Klager; Fabian Langenstein; Simon Langenstein; Peter Lenherr; Ernst Rutten; Jost Waser	Sweden; Roger Andersson; Johannes Bodi; Fredrik Järviö; Jim Johansson; Kristoffer Johansson; Tom Johansson; Mikael Karlsson; Jesper Persson; Björn Törnblom

=== Women's events ===
Event	Gold	Silver	Bronze
Indoor 480 kg	Spain	Japan	Netherlands
Indoor 520 kg	Netherlands	Japan	United States
