= TWIF Indoor World Championships =

Tug of war competition

The Tug of War Indoor World Championships is a tug of war competition organised by the Tug of War International Federation for national teams. It is one of the two main worldwide competitions in the sport and has been held biennially since 2014. TWIF also organizes the TWIF Outdoor World Championships for nations.

== Venues ==
Year	Location
2014	(Republic of Ireland) Castlebar
2016	(Netherlands) Volendam
2018	(China) Xuzhou
2020	(Republic of Ireland) Letterkenny
2023	(Northern Ireland) Parkgate
2024	(Sweden) Helsingborg
2026	(Taiwan) Taipei

== Medallists ==
=== Men's 560kg ===
Year	Gold	Silver	Bronze
2014	Chinese Taipei (TPE)	England (ENG)	Ireland (IRL)
2016	Ireland (IRL)	Chinese Taipei (TPE)	Northern Ireland (NIR)
2018	Ireland (IRL)	Chinese Taipei (TPE)	Basque Country (Basque Country)
2020	Chinese Taipei (TPE)	Northern Ireland (NIR)	Ireland (IRL)
2023	Northern Ireland (NIR)	Basque Country (Basque Country)	Ireland (IRL)
2024	Northern Ireland (NIR)	Chinese Taipei (TPE)	Basque Country (Basque Country)

=== Men's 600kg ===
Year	Gold	Silver	Bronze
2014	Scotland (SCO)	Chinese Taipei (TPE)	Ireland (IRL)
2016	Scotland (SCO)	Chinese Taipei (TPE)	Basque Country (Basque Country)
2018	Netherlands (NED)	Basque Country (Basque Country)	Chinese Taipei (TPE)
2020	Netherlands (NED)	Northern Ireland (NIR)	Ireland (IRL)
2023	Northern Ireland (NIR)	Basque Country (Basque Country)	Chinese Taipei (TPE)
2024	Chinese Taipei (TPE)	Basque Country (Basque Country)	Ireland (IRL)

=== Men's 640kg ===
Year	Gold	Silver	Bronze
2014	Scotland (SCO)	Ireland (IRL)	Spain (ESP)
2016	Scotland (SCO)	Netherlands (NED)	Ireland (IRL)
2018	Scotland (SCO)	Netherlands (NED)	Ireland (IRL)
2020	Scotland (SCO)	Netherlands (NED)	Ireland (IRL)
2023	Ireland (IRL)	Northern Ireland (NIR)	Basque Country (Basque Country)
2024	Netherlands (NED)	Ireland (IRL)	Italy (ITA)

=== Men's 680kg ===
Year	Gold	Silver	Bronze
2014	Scotland (SCO)	Ireland (IRL)	England (ENG)
2016	Scotland (SCO)	Netherlands (NED)	Ireland (IRL)
2018	Scotland (SCO)	Netherlands (NED)	Ireland (IRL)
2020	Scotland (SCO)	Netherlands (NED)	Ireland (IRL)
2023	Ireland (IRL)	Latvia (LAT)	Netherlands (NED)
2024	Netherlands (NED)	Italy (ITA)	Ireland (IRL)

=== Women's 500kg ===
Year	Gold	Silver	Bronze
2014	Chinese Taipei (TPE)	China (CHN)	Spain (ESP)
2016	China (CHN)	Chinese Taipei (TPE)	Basque Country (Basque Country)
2018	China (CHN)	Chinese Taipei (TPE)	Basque Country (Basque Country)
2020	Chinese Taipei (TPE)	Basque Country (Basque Country)	Netherlands (NED)
2023	Chinese Taipei (TPE)	Basque Country (Basque Country)	China (CHN)
2024	Chinese Taipei (TPE)	Basque Country (Basque Country)	China (CHN)

=== Women's 540kg ===
Year	Gold	Silver	Bronze
2014	China (CHN)	Chinese Taipei (TPE)	South Africa (RSA)
2016	China (CHN)	Chinese Taipei (TPE)	Basque Country (Basque Country)
2018	Chinese Taipei (TPE)	China (CHN)	Basque Country (Basque Country)
2020	Chinese Taipei (TPE)	Basque Country (Basque Country)	Netherlands (NED)
2024	China (CHN)	Chinese Taipei (TPE)	Basque Country (Basque Country)

=== Mixed 580kg ===
Year	Gold	Silver	Bronze
2020	Netherlands (NED)	Chinese Taipei (TPE)	Basque Country (Basque Country)
2023	Basque Country (Basque Country)	Scotland (SCO)	Chinese Taipei (TPE)
2024	Basque Country (Basque Country)	Chinese Taipei (TPE)	China (CHN)

=== Mixed 600kg ===
Year	Gold	Silver	Bronze
2014	Chinese Taipei (TPE)	China (CHN)	England (ENG)
2016	Chinese Taipei (TPE)	China (CHN)	Basque Country (Basque Country)
2018	China (CHN)	Netherlands (NED)	Basque Country (Basque Country)
