= Tug of war at the 2005 World Games =

- Venue: Sportspark Wedau (men's events); Sportschule Wedau (women's events)
- Dates: 16-17 July 2005
- Competitors: 10 nations

Tug of war was contested at the 2005 World Games in Duisburg, Germany, between 16 and 17 July 2005. Medals were awarded for three different events, two men's and one women's.

== Participating nations ==
- Chinese Taipei
- Germany
- Great Britain
- Ireland
- Japan
- Netherlands
- South Africa
- Switzerland
- Sweden
- United States

== Medal table ==
* Host nation (Germany)

Rank	Nation	Gold	Silver	Bronze	Total
1	Netherlands (NED)	1	0	1	2
2	Chinese Taipei (TPE)	1	0	0	1
2	Switzerland (SUI)	1	0	0	1
4	Sweden (SWE)	0	2	0	2
5	Japan (JPN)	0	1	0	1
6	Germany (GER)*	0	0	1	1
6	Ireland (IRL)	0	0	1	1
8	Great Britain (GBR)	0	0	0	0
8	South Africa (RSA)	0	0	0	0
8	United States (USA)	0	0	0	0
Totals (10 entries)		3	3	3	9

== Events ==
=== Men ===
Event	Gold	Silver	Bronze
640 kg	Switzerland	Sweden	Germany
680 kg	Netherlands	Sweden	Ireland

=== Women ===
Event	Gold	Silver	Bronze
520 kg	Chinese Taipei	Japan	Netherlands
