= Tug of war at the 2013 World Games =

- Venue: Alberto León Betancur Coliseum
- Dates: 27-28 July 2013
- Competitors: 155 from 11 nations

Tug of war was contested at the 2013 World Games in Cali, Colombia, between 27 and 28 July 2013. The events were held at the Alberto León Betancur Coliseum. Medals were awarded for three different events, two men's and one women's.

== Participating nations ==
- Belgium (11)
- China (11)
- Chinese Taipei (9)
- Germany (20)
- Great Britain (18)
- Ireland (14)
- Latvia (9)
- Netherlands (17)
- South Africa (9)
- Sweden (16)
- Switzerland (21)

== Medal table ==
Rank	Nation	Gold	Silver	Bronze	Total
1	Netherlands (NED)	1	1	0	2
1	Switzerland (SUI)	1	1	0	2
3	Chinese Taipei (TPE)	1	0	0	1
4	Great Britain (GBR)	0	1	0	1
5	Germany (GER)	0	0	1	1
5	South Africa (RSA)	0	0	1	1
5	Sweden (SWE)	0	0	1	1
8	Belgium (BEL)	0	0	0	0
8	China (CHN)	0	0	0	0
8	Ireland (IRL)	0	0	0	0
8	Latvia (LAT)	0	0	0	0
Totals (11 entries)		3	3	3	9

== Events ==
=== Men ===
Event	Gold	Silver	Bronze
640 kg	Switzerland	Great Britain	Germany
700 kg	Netherlands	Switzerland	Sweden

=== Women ===
Event	Gold	Silver	Bronze
520 kg	Chinese Taipei	Netherlands	South Africa
