= Tug of war at the 1981 World Games =

Tug of war was contested in two weight classes for men at the 1981 World Games. These were the first World Games, an international quadrennial multi-sport event, and were held in Santa Clara, California in the United States. The 640 kg tug of war competition was the first event of the games, as it was held immediately following the opening ceremony at the same location, Buck Shaw Stadium. The Swiss athletes were associated with a club from Engelberg, while the United States was represented by a club from Orfordville, Wisconsin. In an interview during the Games, Albert Sabin, the chief judge of the event, revealed that he was from Birmingham, then hastened to add, "England, not (Birmingham) Alabama."

== Medalists ==
Event	Gold	Silver	Bronze
Men
Outdoor 640 kg	England	Switzerland	Netherlands
Outdoor 720 kg	Switzerland	Netherlands	England

== Tug of war, 640kg ==
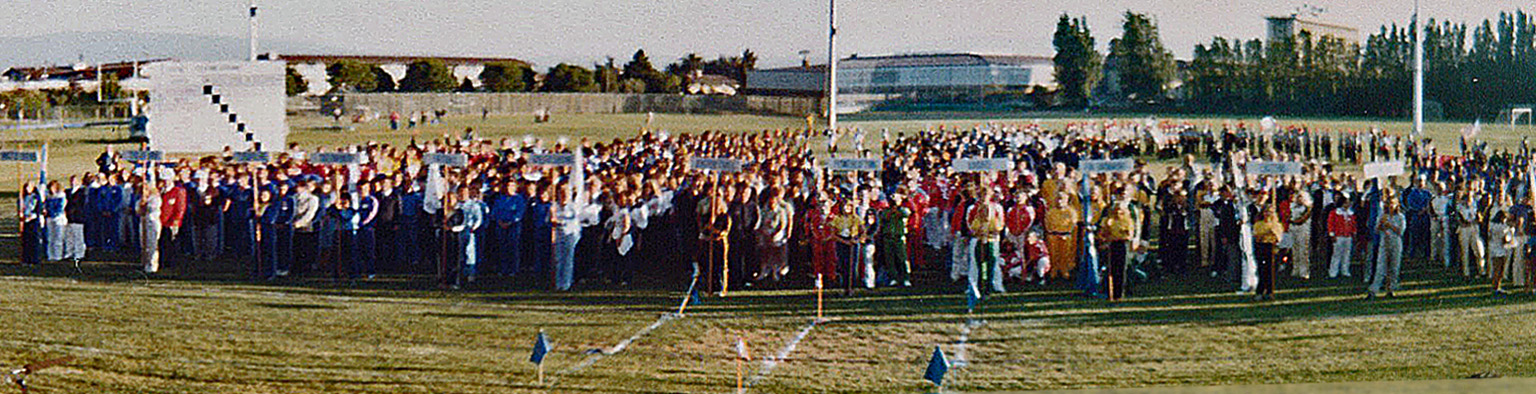
World Games I athletes grouped by sport at the inaugural opening ceremony; tug of war pulling area marked on foreground for first ever World Games event, which followed the ceremony

The outdoor 640 kg tug of war event was conducted on 24 July 1981. It was the first event of the first World Games.

Gold	Silver	Bronze
England Brian Jones; Eric Sutton; Joe Critchlow; John Reilly; Luan Torr; Mark Upton; Ron Critchlow; Rowland Peirson	Switzerland Andreas Arnold; Paul Hurschler; Peter Odermatt; Peter Schleiss; Ruedi Arnold; Sepp Buenter; Walter Bernhard other?	Netherlands Andre Diekman; Bennie Smeiting; Gerrit Bruil; Harry Ravensloot; Herman Geesink; Johan de Jong; Nico Venne; Toon te Boome

Results:

Netherlands def. Wales, 3-0
England def. Ireland, 3-0
Switzerland def. Sweden, 3-0
Netherlands def. U.S., 3-0
Ireland def. Wales, 3-0
England def. Sweden, 3-0
Switzerland def. U.S., 3-0
Netherlands def. England, 2-1
Wales def. Sweden, 3-0
Switzerland def. Ireland, 2-1
England def. U.S., 2-1
Sweden def. Netherlands, 3-0
Switzerland def. Wales, 3-0
Ireland def. U.S., 3-0
England def. Wales, 3-0
Switzerland def. Netherlands, 3-0
Ireland def. Sweden, 3-0
Wales def. U.S., 3-0
England def. Switzerland, 3-0
Netherlands def. Ireland, 3-0
Sweden def. U.S., 3-0

Final standing:

1. England 15 points
2. Switzerland 14
3. Netherlands 11
4. Ireland 10
5. Sweden 6, tie
6. Wales 6, tie
7. USA 1

== Tug of war, 720kg ==
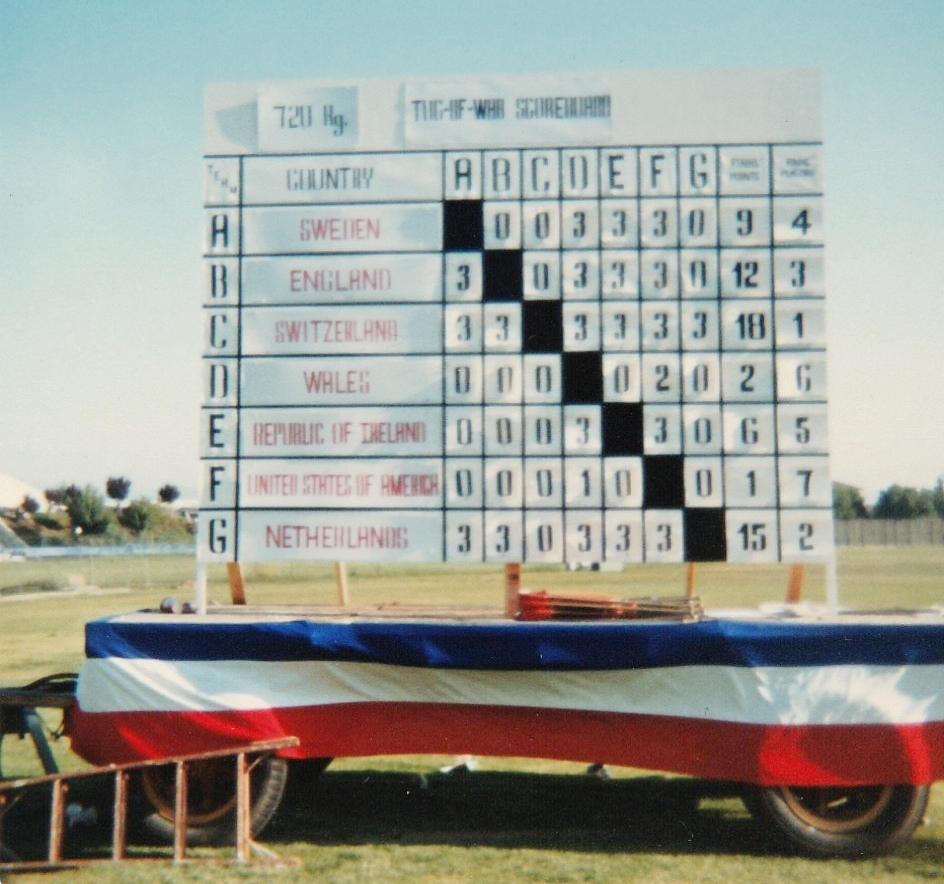
720 kg tug of war final scoreboard at World Games I

The outdoor 720 kg tug of war event was conducted on 25 July 1981.

Gold	Silver	Bronze
Switzerland Albert Feirerabend; Andreas Arnold; Hans Rychen; Karl Langenstein; Peter Odermatt; Peter Schleiss; Ruedi Arnold; Walter Bernhard	Netherlands Albert Weenk; Henk Hemming; Jan Beusink; Johan de Jong; Nico Venne; Nico Versteeg; Toon te Boome; Toon van Culemborg	England unknown.......

Results

Netherlands def. Wales, 3-0
England def. Ireland, 3-0
Switzerland def. Sweden, 3-0
Netherlands def. U.S., 3-0
Ireland def. Wales, 3-0
England def. Sweden, 3-0
Switzerland def. U.S., 3-0
Netherlands def. England, 3-0
Sweden def. Wales, 3-0
Switzerland def. Ireland, 3-0
England def. U.S., 3-0
Netherlands def. Sweden 3-0
Switzerland def. Wales, 3-0
Ireland def. U.S., 3-0
England def. Wales, 3-0
Switzerland def. Netherlands, 3-0
Sweden def. Ireland, 3-0
Wales def. U.S., 2-1
Switzerland def. England, 3-0
Netherlands def. Ireland, 3-0
Sweden def. U.S., 3-0

Final standings:

1. Switzerland 18 points
2. Netherlands 15
3. England 12
4. Sweden 9
5. Ireland 6
6. Wales 2
7. USA 1

Other known individual participants: SWE – Erik Johansson; USA – Tom Naatz
