= TWIF Outdoor World Championships =

Tug of war competition

The Tug of War Outdoor World Championships is a tug of war competition organised by the Tug of War International Federation for national teams. It is the main worldwide competition in the sport and has been held biennially since 2014. TWIF alternates this competition with another biennial world championship, called the TWIF Indoor World Championships for nations.

== Venues ==
Year	Location
2014	(United States) Madison
2016	(Sweden) Malmö
2018	(South Africa) Cape Town
2021	(Spain) Getxo
2022	(Netherlands) Holten
2023	(Switzerland) Sursee
2024	(Germany) Mannheim
2026	(South Africa) Mossel Bay
2028	(Switzerland) St. Gallen

== Medallists ==
=== Men's 580kg (2014-2016) - 560kg (2018-) ===
Year	Gold	Silver	Bronze
2014	Switzerland (SUI)	England (ENG)	Basque Country (Basque Country)
2016	Basque Country (Basque Country)	England (ENG)	Switzerland (SUI)
2018	Germany (GER)	Basque Country (Basque Country)	Netherlands (NED)
2021	Basque Country (Basque Country)	Switzerland (SUI)	Germany (GER)
2022	Switzerland (SUI)	Basque Country (Basque Country)	Germany (GER)
2023	Switzerland (SUI)	Basque Country (Basque Country)	Scotland (SCO)
2024	Basque Country (Basque Country)	Germany (GER)	Switzerland (SUI)

=== Men's 640kg ===
Year	Gold	Silver	Bronze
2014	Switzerland (SUI)	Sweden (SWE)	Germany (GER)
2016	Switzerland (SUI)	Basque Country (Basque Country)	Ireland (IRL)
2018	Switzerland (SUI)	Germany (GER)	England (ENG)
2021	Switzerland (SUI)	Netherlands (NED)	England (ENG)
2022	Switzerland (SUI)	England (ENG)	Netherlands (NED)
2023	Switzerland (SUI)	Netherlands (NED)	Belgium (BEL)
2024	Switzerland (SUI)	Belgium (BEL)	Netherlands (NED)

=== Men's 680kg ===
Year	Gold	Silver	Bronze
2018	Switzerland (SUI)	Netherlands (NED)	England (ENG)
2021	Germany (GER)	Netherlands (NED)	Switzerland (SUI)
2022	Netherlands (NED)	Switzerland (SUI)	England (ENG)
2023	Switzerland (SUI)	Netherlands (NED)	England (ENG)
2024	Germany (GER)	Netherlands (NED)	Chinese Taipei (TPE)

=== Men's 700kg (2014-2016) - 720kg (2018-2022) ===
Year	Gold	Silver	Bronze
2014	Switzerland (SUI)	Sweden (SWE)	Netherlands (NED)
2016	Switzerland (SUI)	Netherlands (NED)	England (ENG)
2018	Netherlands (NED)	Basque Country (Basque Country)	South Africa (RSA)
2021	Switzerland (SUI)	Netherlands (NED)	Germany (GER)
2022	Netherlands (NED)	Switzerland (SUI)	Belgium (BEL)

=== Women's 500kg ===
Year	Gold	Silver	Bronze
2014	Chinese Taipei (TPE)	Sweden (SWE)	Switzerland (SUI)
2016	Chinese Taipei (TPE)	Basque Country (Basque Country)	Sweden (SWE)
2018	Chinese Taipei (TPE)	Switzerland (SUI)	Basque Country (Basque Country)
2021	Basque Country (Basque Country)	Switzerland (SUI)	Netherlands (NED)
2022	Chinese Taipei (TPE)	Switzerland (SUI)	Germany (GER)
2023	Chinese Taipei (TPE)	Switzerland (SUI)	Germany (GER)
2024	Chinese Taipei (TPE)	Switzerland (SUI)	Basque Country (Basque Country)

=== Women's 540kg ===
Year	Gold	Silver	Bronze
2014	Sweden (SWE)	Switzerland (SUI)	Chinese Taipei (TPE)
2016	Chinese Taipei (TPE)	Sweden (SWE)	South Africa (RSA)
2018	Chinese Taipei (TPE)	Switzerland (SUI)	England (ENG)
2021	Sweden (SWE)	Switzerland (SUI)	Netherlands (NED)
2022	Chinese Taipei (TPE)	Netherlands (NED)	Sweden (SWE)
2023	Chinese Taipei (TPE)	Switzerland (SUI)	Sweden (SWE)
2024	Chinese Taipei (TPE)	Sweden (SWE)	Netherlands (NED)

=== Mixed 600kg (2014-2016) - 580kg (2018-) ===
Year	Gold	Silver	Bronze
2014	Sweden (SWE)	Netherlands (NED)	Basque Country (Basque Country)
2016	Sweden (SWE)	Basque Country (Basque Country)	Netherlands (NED)
2018	England (ENG)	Sweden (SWE)	Netherlands (NED)
2021	Sweden (SWE)	Switzerland (SUI)	England (ENG)
2022	Netherlands (NED)	Switzerland (SUI)	Germany (GER)
2023	Sweden (SWE)	Basque Country (Basque Country)	Italy (ITA)
2024	Switzerland (SUI)	Belgium (BEL)	Germany (GER)
