= Akita Prefectural Central Park =

Sports park in Akita, Japan

Coordinates: 39°37′23″N 140°12′15″E

- 秋田県立中央公園

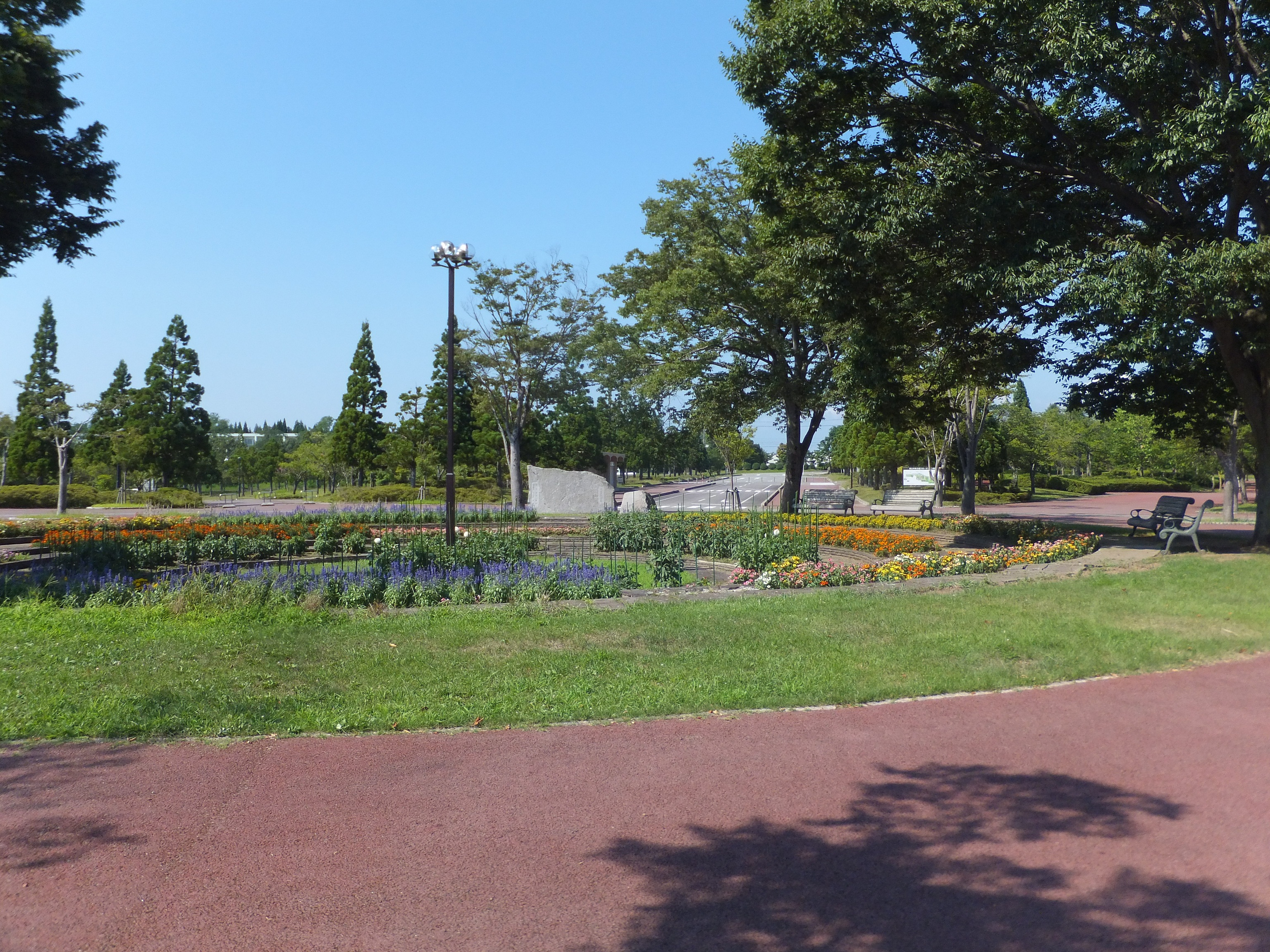

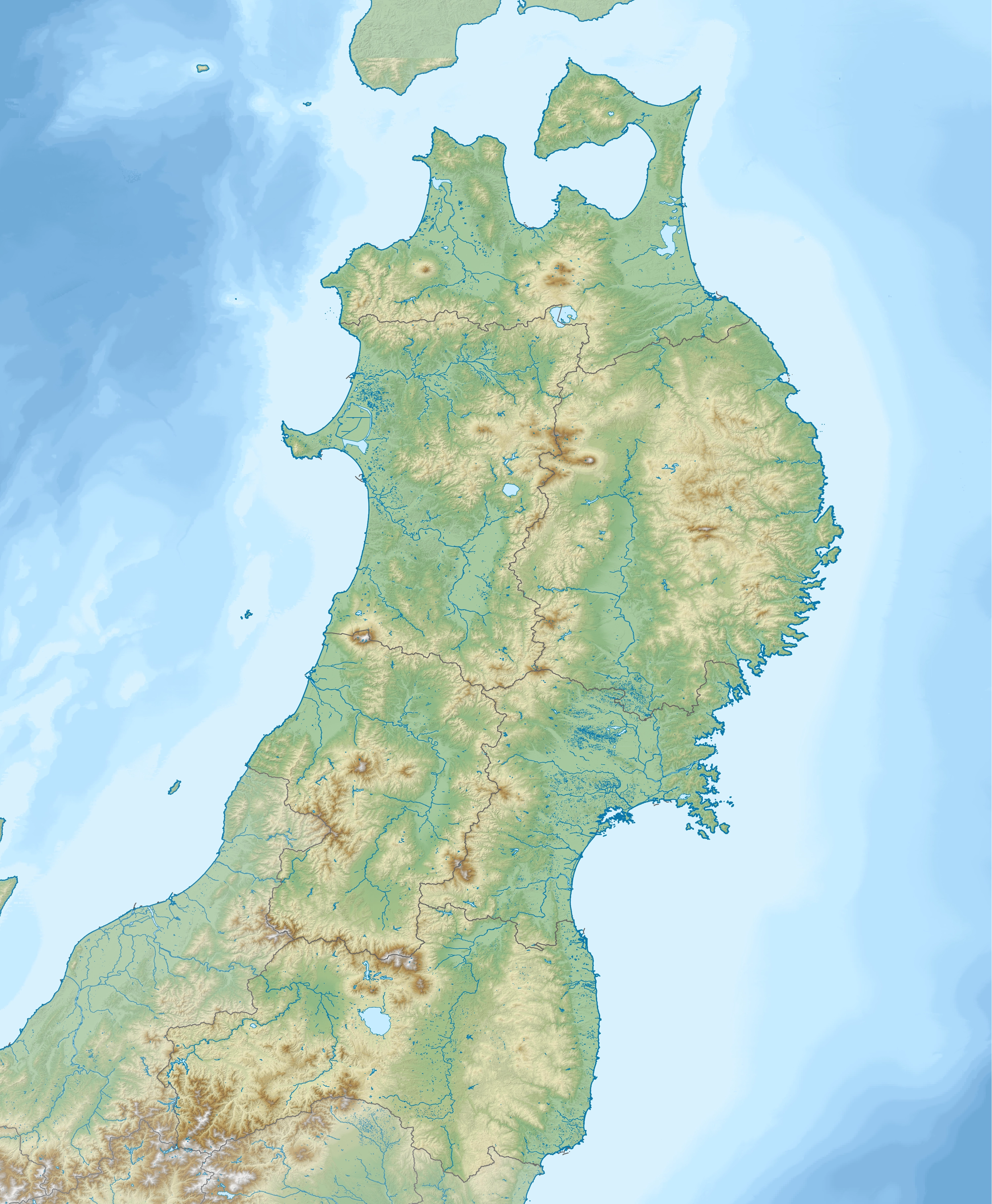
- Location within Akita Prefecture Location within Tohoku, Japan Location within Japan
- Interactive map of Akita Prefectural Central Park
- Full name: Akita Prefectural Central Park
- Location: Yuwa, Akita, Akita, Japan
- Owner: Akita Prefecture
- Capacity: Main Stadium:22,000; Playing Field:16,500; Baseball Stadium:5,000
- Field size: 5,838,000 sqm

Construction
- Opened: 17 March 1983
- Architect: Kunie Ito
- General contractor: Sky Dome:Kajima

Tenants
- Saruta Kōgyō S.C. [tl] Hokuto Bank SC; Akita FC Cambiare; TDK Shinwakai; Akita University Medical FC

Website
- www.akisouko.com/chuo/

Akita Prefectural Central Park (Japanese: 秋田県立中央公園) is a group of sports facilities in Yuwa, Akita, Akita, Japan.

== Facilities ==
=== Akita Sky Dome ===
The dome is the practice facility for the Blaublitz Akita.

=== Prefectural Training Center Arena & Lodge ===
- Stadiums
- Ball parks
- Baseball field
- Tennis courts (20, Artificial turf)
- Archery range
- Training center
- Cross-country skiing course
- Barbecue square
- Camping site

== Gallery ==
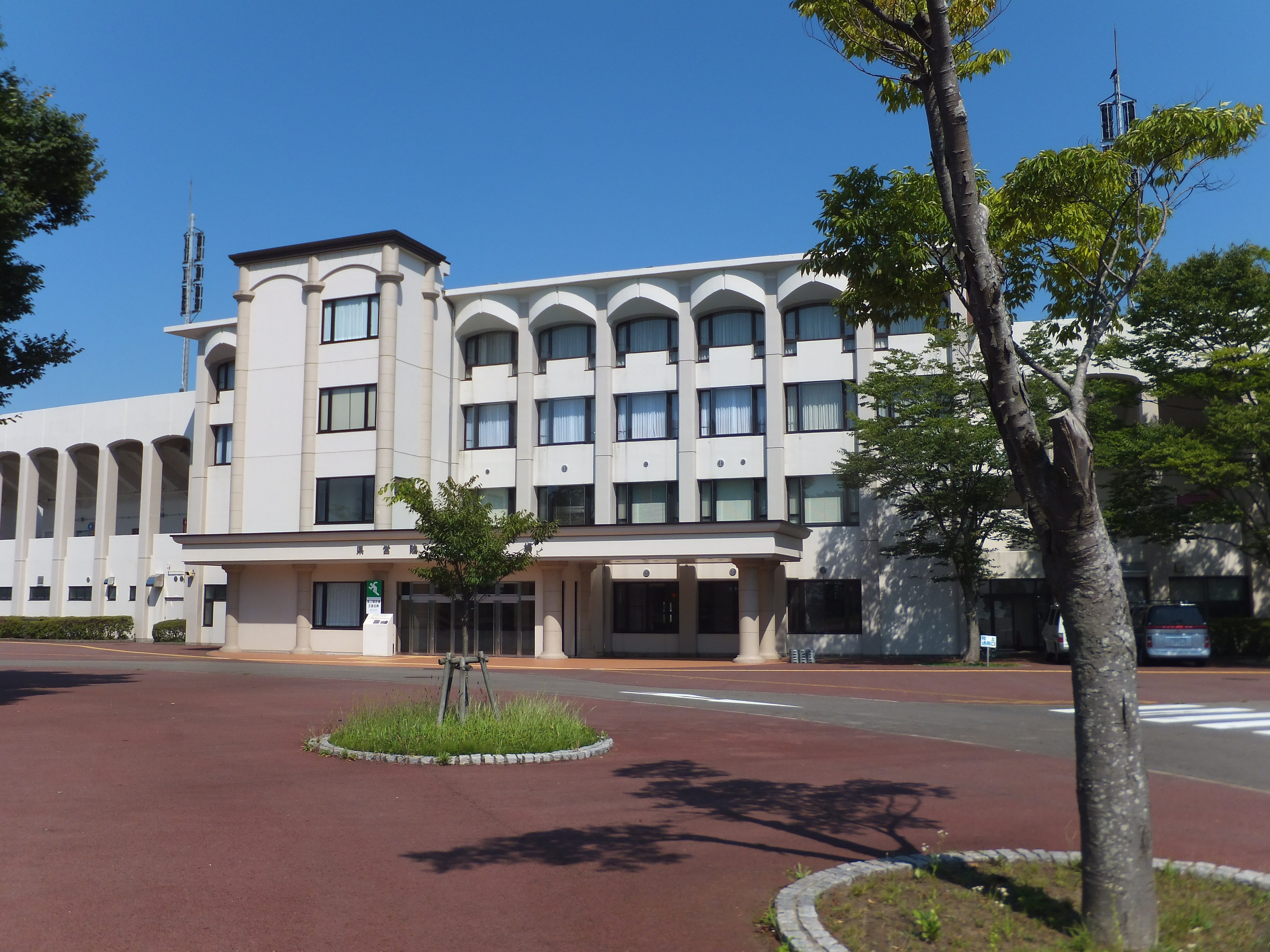
Athletic Studium

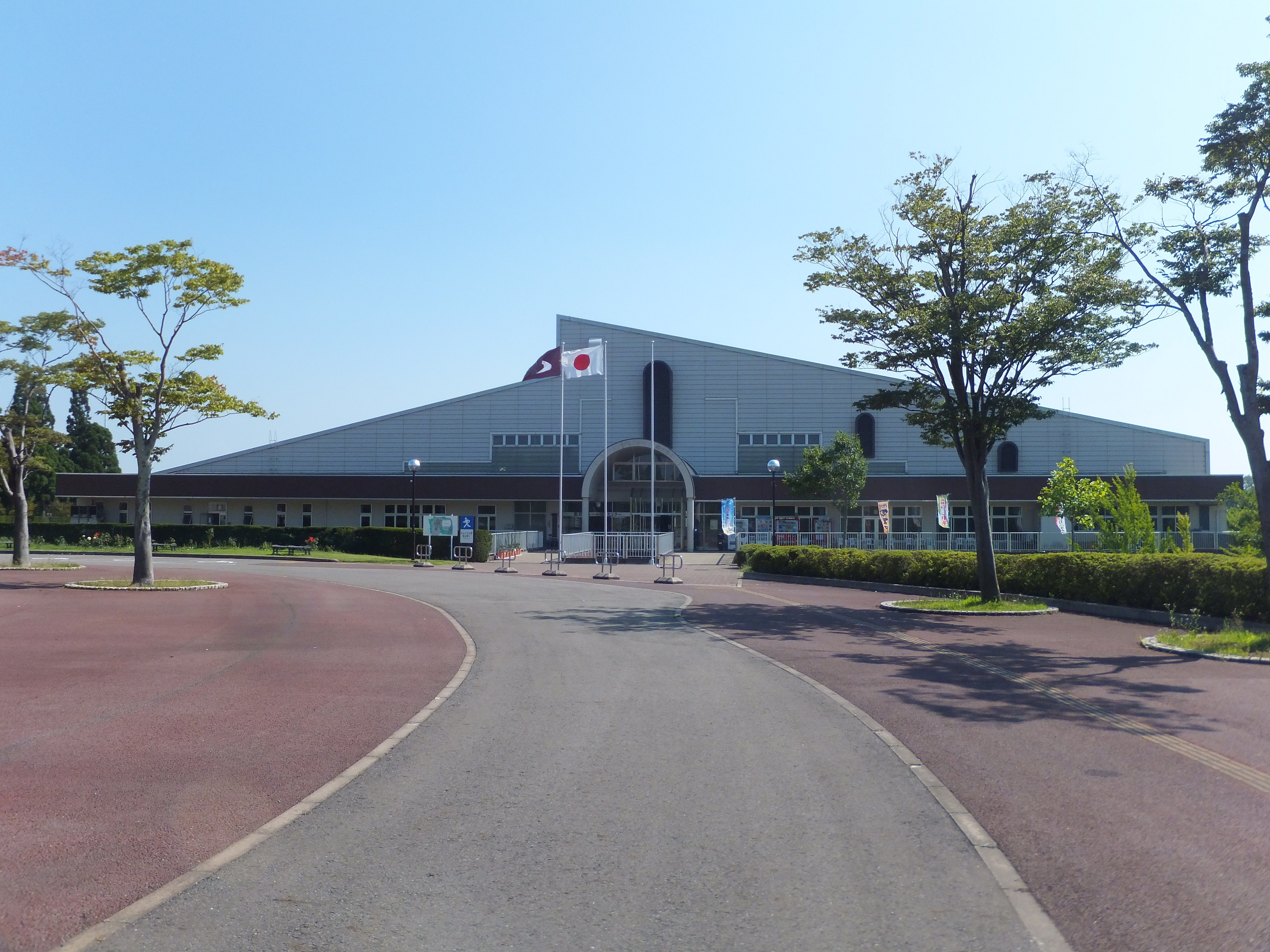
Administration Bureau

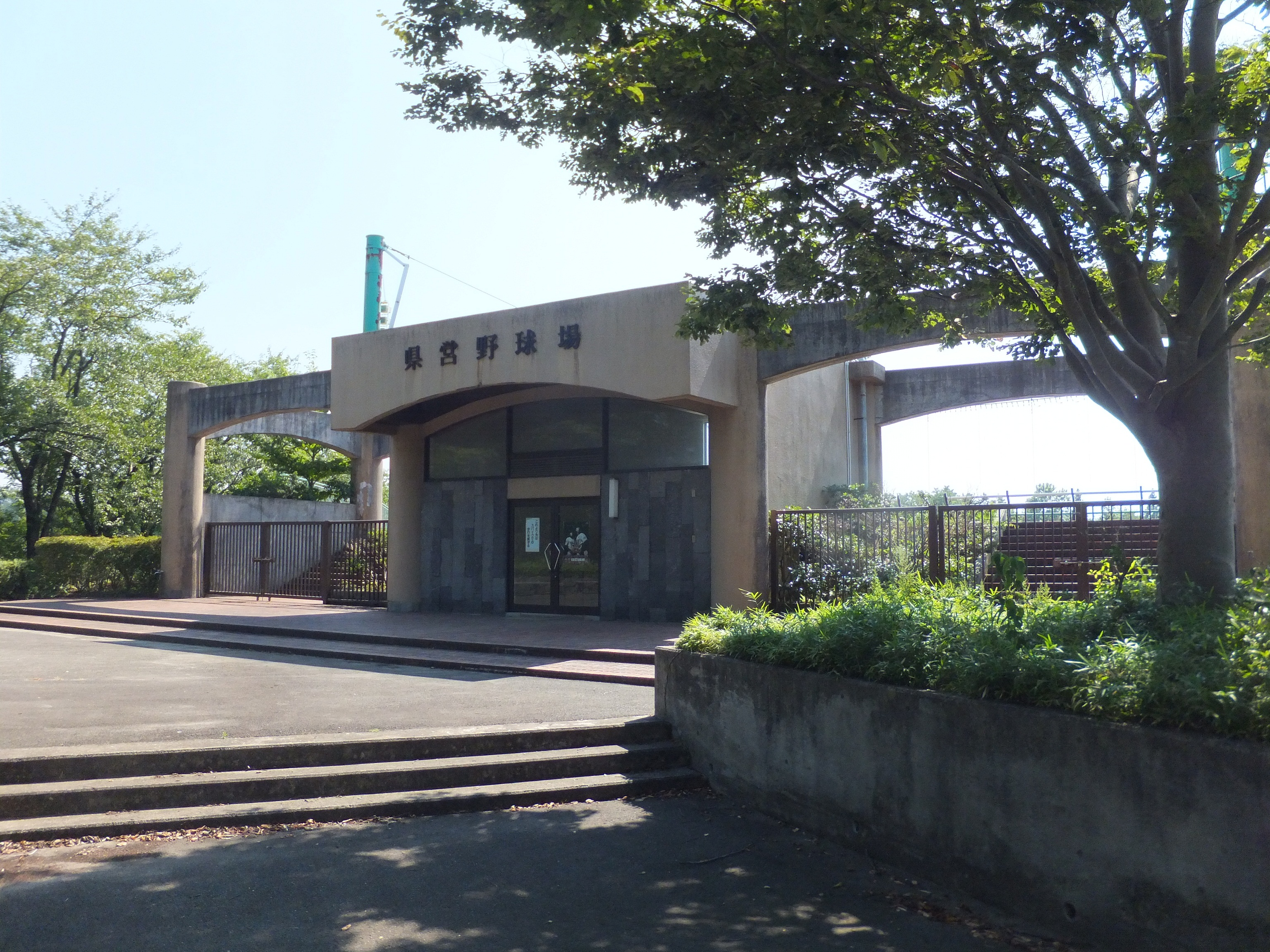
Baseball Stadium

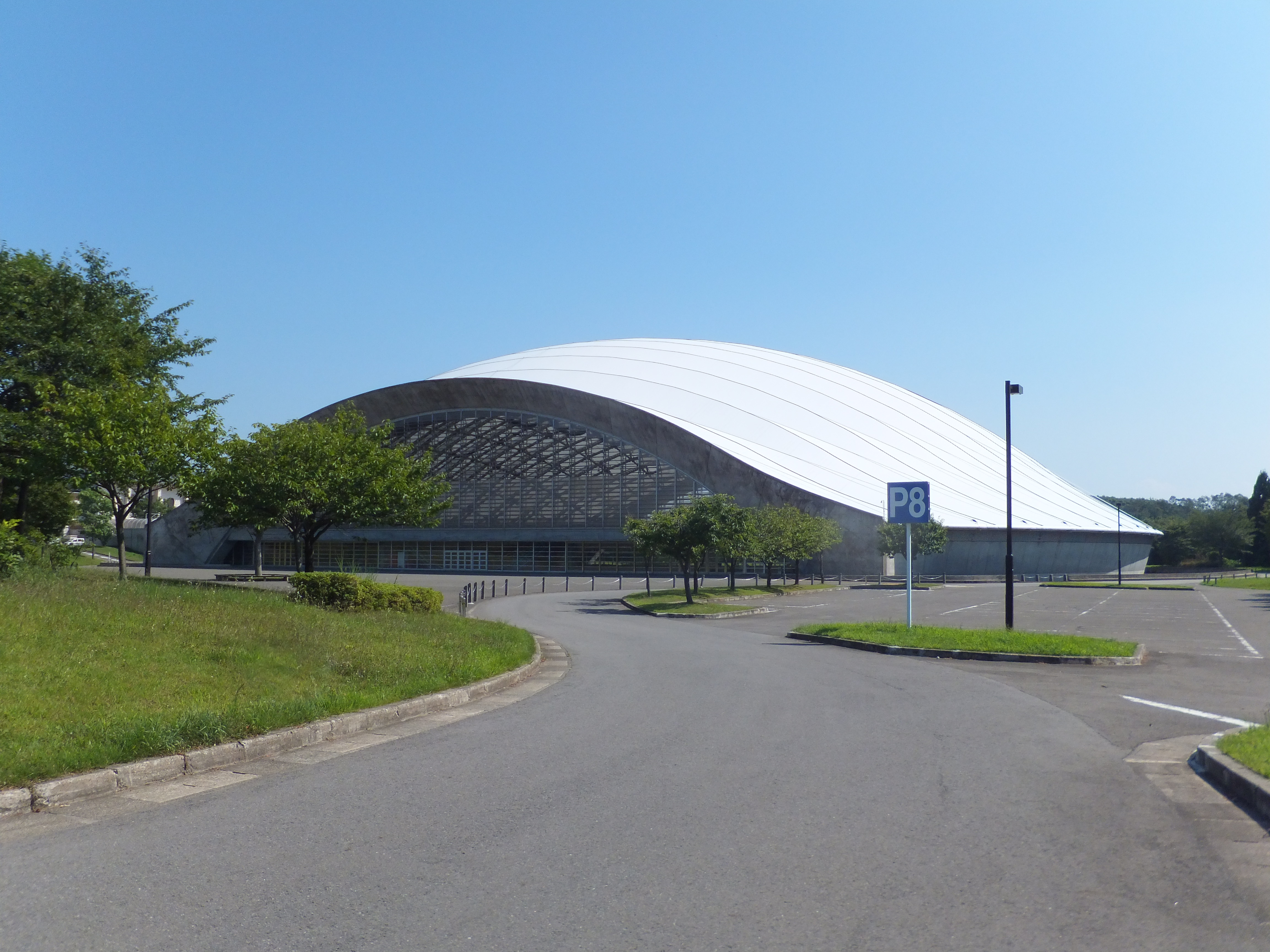
Akita Sky Dome

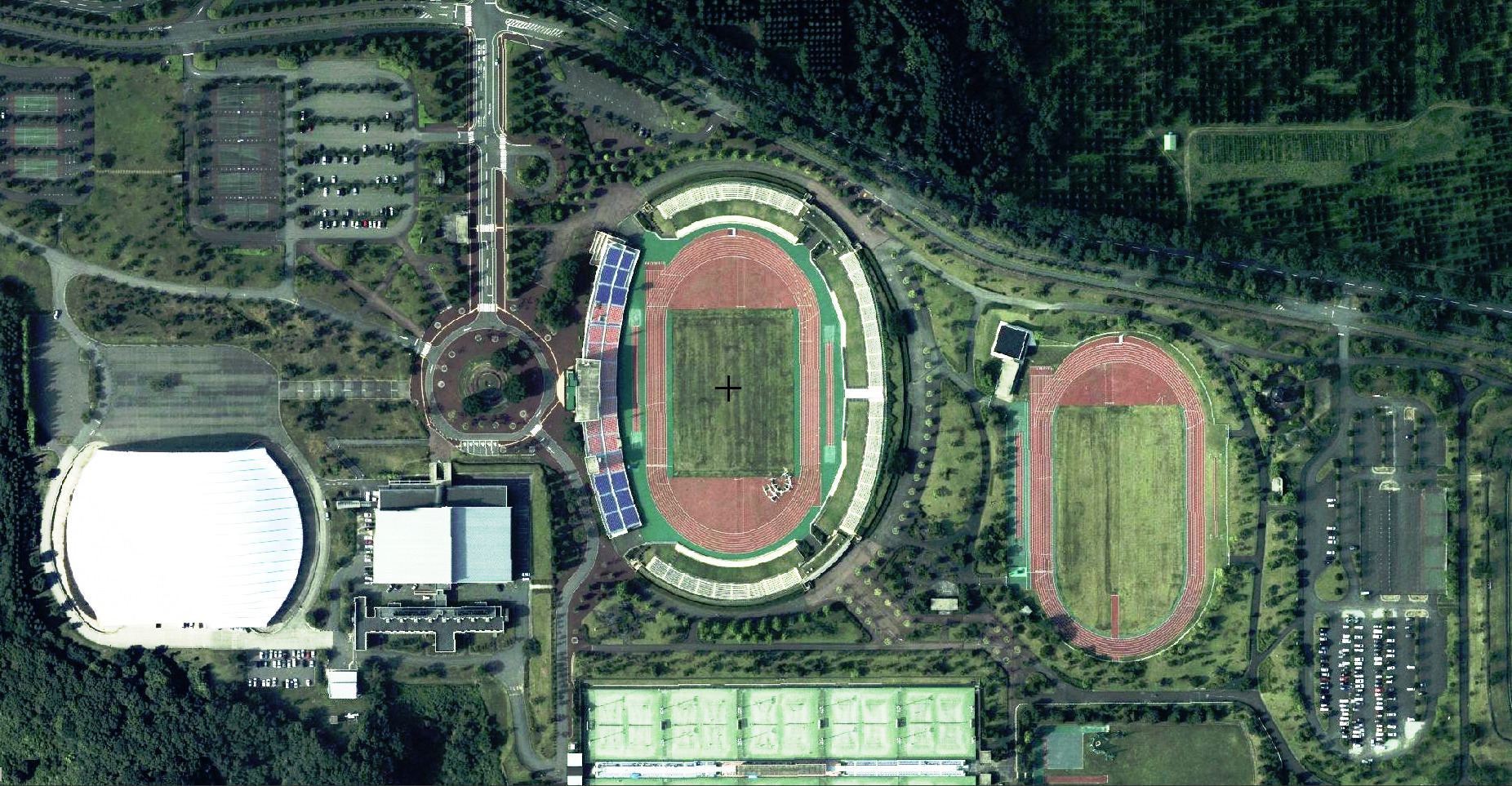
Athletic Stadium, Sky Dome and Administration Bureau

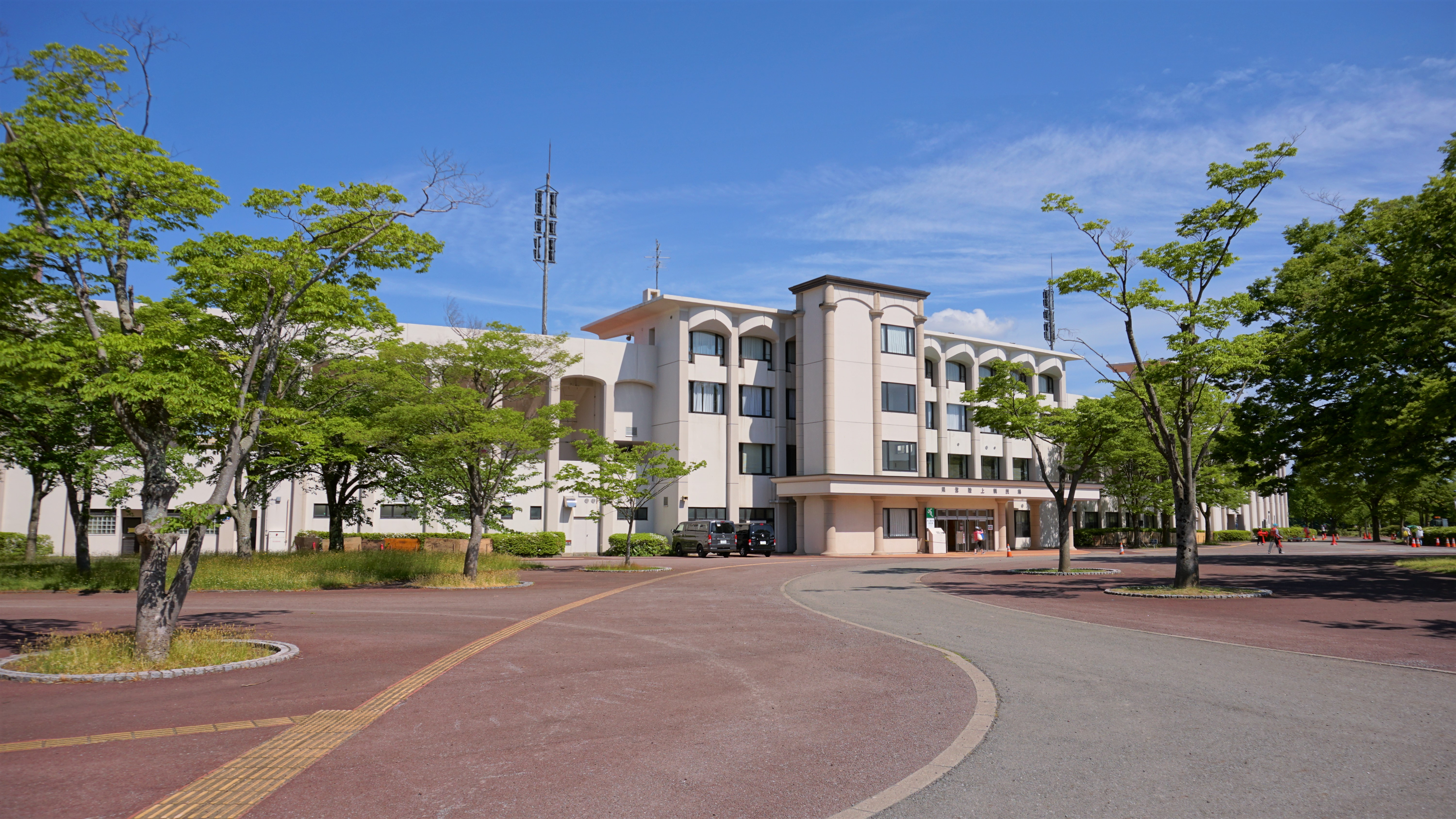
Athletic Stadium

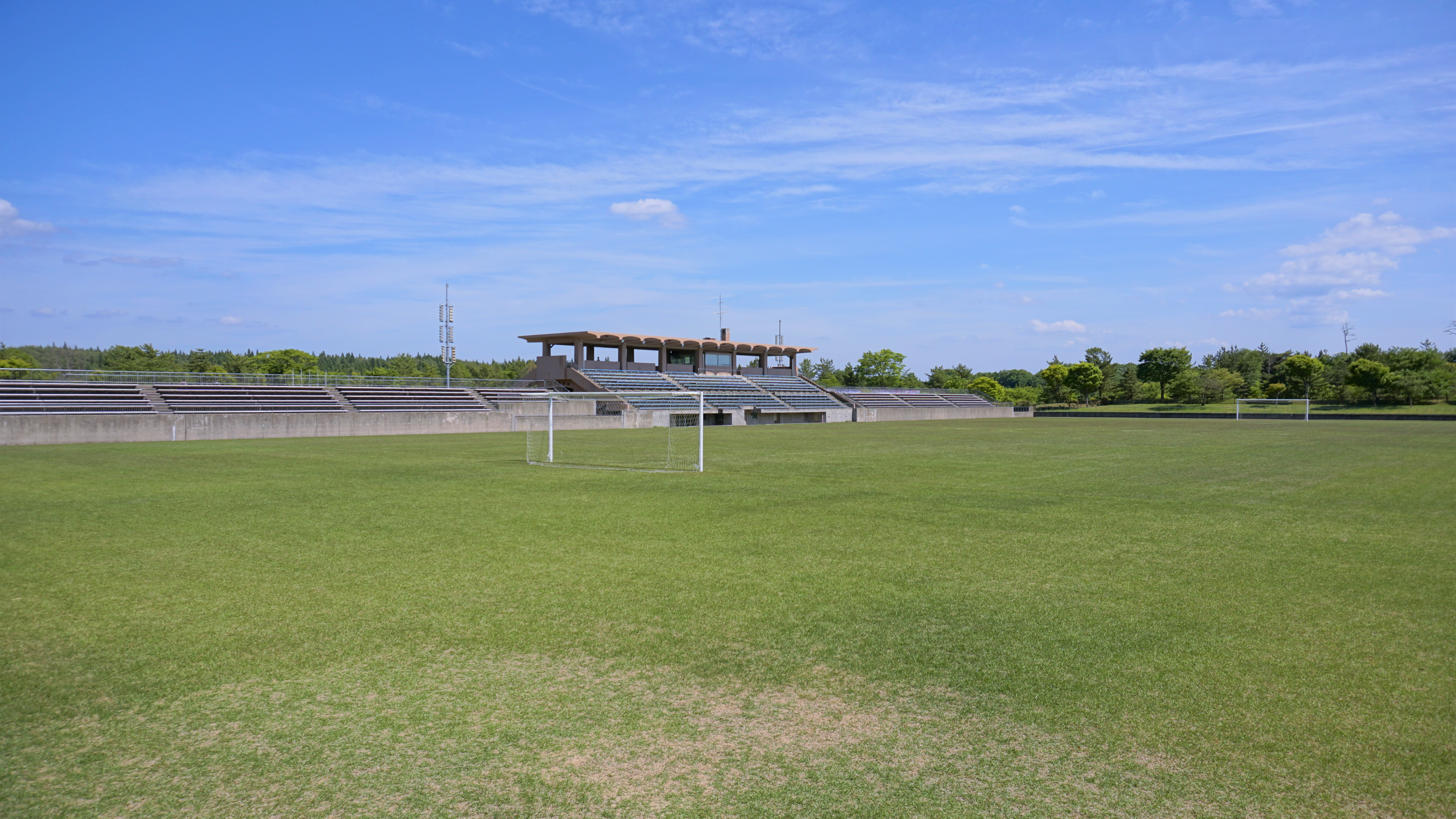
Playing Field

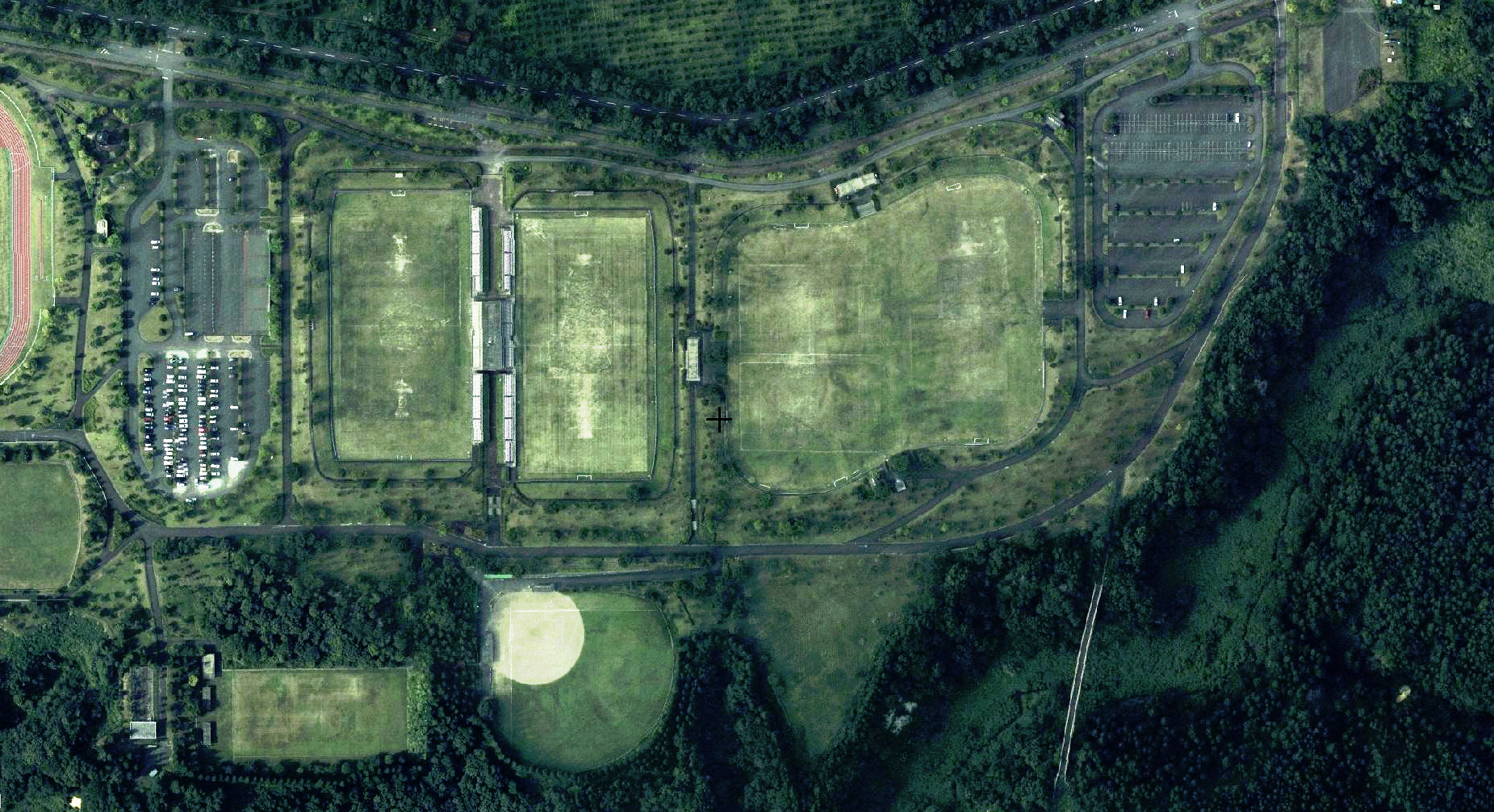
Playing Fields

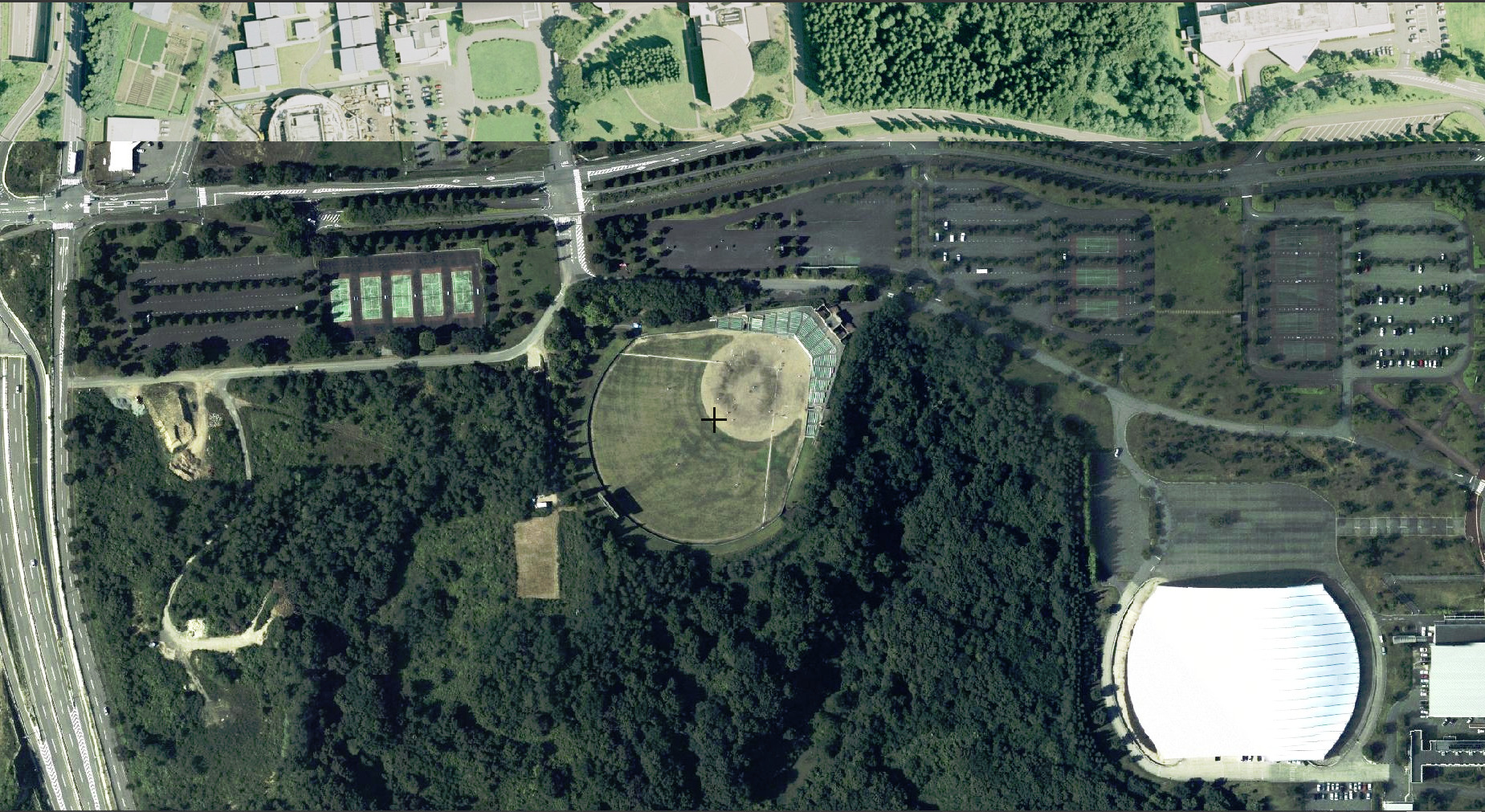
Baseball Stadium
