= World Games sports =

Sports contested in the World Games

The World Games sports comprise all the sports contested in The World Games. Starting in Birmingham 2022, there was no distinction between official and invitational sports. José Perurena, IWGA President, stated, "In Birmingham, for the first time, invitational sports were no longer presented separately but were also part of the official programme." This is now The World Games policy.

== Sports ==
Disciplines from the same sport are grouped under the same color:

Included in the Olympic program
As invitational sport

Official sports
Sport (Discipline)		Body	1981	1985	1989	1993	1997	2001	2005	2009	2013	2017	2022	2025	2029
Air badminton		BWF													X
Air sports		FAI					5	4	5	5	3	3	2	1	X
Archery		WA		4	4	6	6	6	6	6	7	7	7	7	X
Baseball5		WBSC (Note: The World Baseball Softball Confederation, which currently governs both baseball and softball, was created by a 2013 merger of two former governing bodies—the International Baseball Federation and the International Softball Federation.)													X
Beach handball		IHF						2	2	2	2	2	2	2	X
Billiard sports	Billiards	WCBS						1	1	1	1	1	1	2	X
Billiard sports	Pool	WCBS						2	2	2	2	2	2	3	X
Billiard sports	Snooker	WCBS						1	1	1	1	1	1	2	X
Boules sports		WPBF		1	2	2	2	4	6	8	8	12	4	6	X
Bowling		IBF (Note: The world governing body for nine-pin and ten-pin bowling changed its name from Fédération Internationale des Quilleurs to World Bowling in 2014.)	3	5	3	3	3	3	6	3	3	4	4		
Canoe	Canoe marathon	PW									6		4	4	X
Canoe	Canoe polo	PW							2	2	2	2	2	2	X
Canoe	Dragon boat	PW							4	4				6	
Cheerleading		ICU												1	X
Dancesport		WDSF					2	2	3	3	3	4	5	4	X
Duathlon		TRI									2			3	X
Fistball		IFA		1	1	1	1	1	1	1	1	1	2	2	X
Flag football		IFAF											2	1	X
Floorball		IFF					1					1	1	2	X
Flying disc	Disc golf	WFDF						2						1	X
Flying disc	Ultimate	WFDF			•			1	1	1	1	1	1	1	X
Gymnastics	Acrobatic gymnastics	WG				15	15	5	5	5	5	5	5	5	X
Gymnastics	Aerobic gymnastics	WG					4	4	5	5	7	5	4	4	X
Gymnastics	Rhythmic gymnastics	WG						4	4	4	3	4	4		X
Gymnastics	Trampoline and Tumbling	WG	8	6	6	6	6	6	6	6	6	6	4	6	X
Gymnastics	Parkour	WG											4	4	X
Hockey5s		FIH													X
Indoor cycling		UCI			5										X
Ju-jitsu		JJIF					10	9	10	10	13	22	18	19	X
Karate		WKF	9	12	12	12	12	12	13	13	12	12	12	12	X
Kickboxing		WAKO										7	6	12	X
Korfball		IKF		1	1	1	1	1	1	1	1	1	1	2	X
Lacrosse		WL										1	2	1	X
Lifesaving		ILS		10	16	16	16	16	16	16	16	16	16	16	X
Miniature golf		WMF			•										X
Muaythai		IFMA										11	12	6	X
Orienteering		IOF						3	3	5	5	5	5	5	X
Powerboating		UIM												3	
Powerlifting		IPF	9	3	6	6	6	6	6	8	8	8	8	16	X
Racquetball		IRF	4	2		2				2	2		2	3	
Roller sports	Artistic roller skating	WSkate (Note: Previously Fédération Internationale de Roller Sports which merged with International Skateboarding Federation in September 2017 to form the current World Skate.)	4	4	4	4	4	4	4	4	4	4	3		
Roller sports	Roller hockey	WSkate	1	1	1	1		1							
Roller sports	Inline hockey	WSkate							1	1	1	1	1	1	
Roller sports	Roller speed skating	WSkate	8	12	10	10									?
Roller sports	Inline speed skating	WSkate					10	10	12	10	18	18	18	18	?
Roller sports	Inline freestyle	WSkate												4	
Sambo		FIAS		17		9								11	
Softball		WBSC	2	1			1996-2008			1	1		1	2	
Sport climbing		WC							4	4	4	6	6	6	X
Squash		WS					2		2	2	2	2	2	2	X
Sumo		IFS						8	8	8	8	8	8		X
Tug of war		TWIF	2	2	2	2	2	2	3	3	3	3	3	3	X
Underwater sports	Finswimming	CMAS	12	17	14	14	16	10	10	10	10	14	16	16	X
Underwater sports	Freediving	CMAS												9	X
Water skiing, Wakeboard		IWWF	8	6	6	6	12	6	8	6	8	8	8	6	X
Wheelchair rugby (Note: Paralympic Sport since 2000)		WWR											1		
Wushu		IWUF								13	16		10	12	X
Previous official sports
Sport (Discipline)		Body	1981	1985	1989	1993	1997	2001	2005	2009	2013	2017	2022	2025	2029
Badminton		BWF	5			since 1992									
Baseball		WBSC	1			1992-2008							2020		2028
Beach volleyball		FIVB				2	since 1996								
Bodybuilding		IFBB	6	6	6	7	9	7	7	7					
Casting		ICSF	11	12		13	12	6	6						
Netball		WN		1	1	1									
Rugby sevens		WR (Note: During the period in which rugby sevens was contested at the World Games, the world governing body was known as the International Rugby Board. The current name of World Rugby was adopted in 2014.)						1	1	1	1	since 2016			
Taekwondo		WT	10	8	12	12		since 2000							
Triathlon		TRI			•	4		since 2000							
Weightlifting (women)		IWF					9	since 2000							
Invitational sports
Sport (Discipline)		Body	1981	1985	1989	1993	1997	2001	2005	2009	2013	2017	2022	2025	2029
Water polo (women) (Note: A structured invitational sport program did not exist for the 1981 World Games. Press coverage did not refer to water polo as an invitational sport. An agreement was reached with FINA in the lead-up to the games not to allow women's water polo athletes to march in the opening ceremony, to assuage the displeasure of the International Olympic Committee (IOC) for its being included in the program.)		AQUA	1					since 2000							
American football		IFAF							1			1			
Motocross		FIM		•											
Speedway		FIM		•								1			
Indoor motorcycle trials		FIM							1						
Aikido		IAF			•	•	•	•	•						
Boomerang					•										
Baton twirling						•									
Equestrian vaulting		FEI				•									
Boule Lyonnaise (Note: From 2001 Boule Lyonnaise has been part of the Boules Sports program.)		WPBF					2								
Military pentathlon		IMSC					2								
Pesäpallo							1								
Tug of war (women)		TWIF					2	1							
Gateball		WGU						1							
Indoor hockey		FIH							2						
Tchoukball		FITB								2					
Indoor rowing		WR										7			
Medal Events			104	125	112	155	165	140	169	164	199	201	223	256	TBA
Official sports			15	20	19	21	23	27	31	31	32	27	30	35	36
Invitational sports			1	4	5	3	6	5	6	5	4	4	5	N/A	N/A

== Past TWG sports and disciplines ==
- Bodybuilding (bodybuilding, fitness) – Last contested in 2009
- Bowling (Nine-pin bowling) – Contested only in 2005 as official
- Casting – Last contested in 2005
- Lifesaving (Beach) – Last contested in 2009
- Netball – Last contested in 1993
- Roller hockey (quad skate) - Last contested in 2001

=== Past TWG sports and disciplines added to the Olympic Games ===
- Badminton – became an Olympic sport at the 1992 Summer Olympics
- Baseball and Softball – were Olympic sports from 1992 (baseball)/1996 (softball) to 2008, and returned to the Olympics in 2020 and 2028 as optional sports
- Beach volleyball - became an Olympic sport at the 1996 Summer Olympics
- Breakdancing - became an Olympic sport at the 2024 Summer Olympics
- Flag football – will become an Olympic sport at the 2028 Summer Olympics
- Karate – became an Olympic sport at the 2020 Summer Olympics
- Lacrosse sixes – will become an Olympic sport at the 2028 Summer Olympics (lacrosse was competed at the 1904 and 1908 Summer Olympics as field lacrosse)
- Rugby sevens – became an Olympic sport at the 2016 Summer Olympics (rugby union was competed as 15-a-side at the 1900, 1908, 1920 and 1924 Summer Olympics)
- Sport climbing – became an Olympic sport at the 2020 Summer Olympics
- Squash – will become an Olympic sport at the 2028 Summer Olympics
- Taekwondo – became an Olympic sport at the 2000 Summer Olympics
- Trampolining – certain individual events were introduced at the 2000 Summer Olympics
- Triathlon – became an Olympic sport at the 2000 Summer Olympics
- Water polo (women) - became an Olympic sport at the 2000 Summer Olympics (men never competed in water polo in The World Games, as it has been in all Summer Olympics since 1900)
- Weightlifting (women) - became an Olympic sport at the 2000 Summer Olympics (men never competed in weightlifting in The World Games, as it has been all Summer Olympics since 1920 and was also in the Summer Olympics in 1896 and 1904)
