= Major achievements in roller hockey by nation =

This is a list of countries according to the best position achieved by athletes of these nations at major world tournaments in roller hockey. The variations of hockey included here are quad (also known as rink hockey) and inline hockey. Aside from the best results achieved at the world championships for each variation, also included are results from the World Games and the World Roller Games. Medals earned by athletes from defunct NOCs or historical teams have been merged with the results achieved by their immediate successor states, as follows: Czech Republic inherits medals from Czechoslovakia and Germany inherits medals from West Germany. Medals earned by teams from England are merged with results from Great Britain. Results achieved in youth, junior or U20 events were not considered for the making of this table, neither were para adaptations of hockey (power hockey).

== Results ==
Last updated after the 2025 World Games
		Quad hockey (FIRS)				Roller in-line hockey (FIRS and IIHF)					
		World Cup		World Games	Roller Games	World Championships			World Games	Roller Games	
Rk.	Nation	Men	Women	Men	Men	Men (IIHF)	Men (FIRS)	Women	Men	Men	Women
1	Spain	1st place, gold medalist(s)	1st place, gold medalist(s)	2nd place, silver medalist(s)	1st place, gold medalist(s)		3rd place, bronze medalist(s)	1st place, gold medalist(s)			2nd place, silver medalist(s)
2	Italy	1st place, gold medalist(s)	2nd place, silver medalist(s)	1st place, gold medalist(s)		2nd place, silver medalist(s)	2nd place, silver medalist(s)	2nd place, silver medalist(s)		2nd place, silver medalist(s)	
2	United States			2nd place, silver medalist(s)		1st place, gold medalist(s)	1st place, gold medalist(s)	1st place, gold medalist(s)	1st place, gold medalist(s)		1st place, gold medalist(s)
4	Canada		1st place, gold medalist(s)			1st place, gold medalist(s)	1st place, gold medalist(s)	1st place, gold medalist(s)	2nd place, silver medalist(s)		3rd place, bronze medalist(s)
4	France	3rd place, bronze medalist(s)	1st place, gold medalist(s)				1st place, gold medalist(s)	1st place, gold medalist(s)	2nd place, silver medalist(s)	1st place, gold medalist(s)	
6	Czech Republic					1st place, gold medalist(s)	1st place, gold medalist(s)	1st place, gold medalist(s)	1st place, gold medalist(s)	3rd place, bronze medalist(s)	
7	Germany		3rd place, bronze medalist(s)	3rd place, bronze medalist(s)		2nd place, silver medalist(s)	3rd place, bronze medalist(s)	3rd place, bronze medalist(s)			
8	Portugal	1st place, gold medalist(s)	2nd place, silver medalist(s)	1st place, gold medalist(s)	2nd place, silver medalist(s)						
9	Argentina	1st place, gold medalist(s)	1st place, gold medalist(s)	2nd place, silver medalist(s)	3rd place, bronze medalist(s)						
10	Switzerland	2nd place, silver medalist(s)				3rd place, bronze medalist(s)	1st place, gold medalist(s)		3rd place, bronze medalist(s)		
11	Finland					1st place, gold medalist(s)	3rd place, bronze medalist(s)				
12	Brazil		2nd place, silver medalist(s)	2nd place, silver medalist(s)							
13	New Zealand		3rd place, bronze medalist(s)					3rd place, bronze medalist(s)			
14	Chile		1st place, gold medalist(s)								
14	(United Kingdom) Great Britain	1st place, gold medalist(s)									
14	Sweden					1st place, gold medalist(s)					
17	Austria						2nd place, silver medalist(s)				
17	Belgium	2nd place, silver medalist(s)									
17	Netherlands	2nd place, silver medalist(s)									
17	Slovakia					2nd place, silver medalist(s)					
21	Australia							3rd place, bronze medalist(s)			
21	Colombia		3rd place, bronze medalist(s)								
21	Japan		3rd place, bronze medalist(s)								

== See also ==
- List of major achievements in sports by nation
