= List of 1981 World Games medal winners =

World Games medalists list

The 1981 World Games were held in Santa Clara, United States, from July 24 to August 2, 1981.

== Badminton ==
Event	Gold	Silver	Bronze
Men's singles	Chen Changjie; China	Morten Frost; Denmark	Prakash Padukone; Thailand; Liem Swie King; Indonesia
Men's doubles	Sun Zhian; Yao Ximing; China	Thomas Kihlström; Stefan Karlsson; Sweden	Billy Gilliland; Dan Travers; Scotland; Hariamanto Kartono; Rudy Heryanto; Indonesia
Women's singles	Zhang Ailing; China	Hwang Sun-ai; South Korea	Lene Køppen; Denmark; Fumiko Tohkairin; Japan
Women's doubles	Zhang Ailing; Liu Xia; China	Nora Perry; Jane Webster; England	Fumiko Tohkairin; Sonoe Otsuka; Japan; Hwang Sun-ai; Kim Yun-ja; South Korea
Mixed doubles	Gillian Gilks; England; Thomas Kihlström; Sweden	Nora Perry; Mike Tredgett; England	Lene Køppen; Steen Skovgaard; Denmark; Imelda Wiguna; Christian Hadinata; Indonesia

== Baseball ==
Event	Gold	Silver	Bronze
Men's	United States	South Korea	Australia

== Bodybuilding ==
Event	Gold	Silver	Bronze
Men's -65 kg	Renato Bertagna; Italy	Esmal Abdullah Sadek; Egypt	Joseph Disinti; United States
Men's -70 kg	James Youngblood; United States	Billy Knight; Australia	Erwin Note; Belgium
Men's -80 kg	Jacques Neuville; France	Jesse Gautreaux; United States	Keijo Reiman; Finland
Men's +80 kg	John Kemper; United States	Wayne Robins; Canada	Ahmed el-Sayed Ibrahim; Egypt
Women's -52 kg	Pam Brooks; United States	Josée Baumgartner; France	Christine Reed; United States
Women's +52 kg	Kike Elomaa; Finland	Gail Schroeter; United States	Deborah Diana; United States

== Bowling ==
Event	Gold	Silver	Bronze
Men's tenpin all-events	Arne Strøm; Norway	Ernst Berndt; Austria	Chris Batson; Australia
Women's tenpin all-events	Liliane Gregori; France	Porntip Singha; Thailand	Mary-Lou Vining; United States
Mixed tenpin pairs	Ruth Guerster; Chris Batson; Australia	Ari Leppala; Mikko Kaartinen; Finland	Hilde Reitermaier; Ernst Berndt; Austria

== Casting ==
Event	Gold	Silver	Bronze
Men's fly accuracy	Harald Mæhle; Norway	Chris Korich; United States	Erwin Meindl; Austria
Men's fly distance single handed	Steve Rajeff; United States	Martin Hayes; Australia	Øyvind Førland; Norway
Men's fly distance double handed	Steve Rajeff; United States	Chris Korich; United States	Øyvind Førland; Norway
Men's spinning accuracy arenberg target	Guido Vinck; Belgium	Harald Mæhle; Norway	Steve Rajeff; United States
Men's spinning accuracy	Øyvind Førland; Norway	Tom Martens; Netherlands	Helmut Hockwartner; Austria
Men's spinning distance single handed	Ernst Rohatsch; Austria	Markus Kläusler; Switzerland	Steve Rajeff; United States
Men's spinning distance double handed	Chris Korich; United States	Helmut Hockwartner; Austria	Kevin Carriero; United States
Men's multiplier accuracy	Øyvind Førland; Norway	Chris Korich; United States	Zack Wilson; United States
Men's multiplier distance single handed	Steve Rajeff; United States	Chris Korich; United States	Zack Wilson; United States
Men's multiplier distance double handed	Chris Korich; United States	Bruce Walker; Canada	Keith Pryor; United States
Men's allround	Steve Rajeff; United States	Tim Rajeff; United States	Øyvind Førland; Norway

== Finswimming ==
Event	Gold	Silver	Bronze
Men's 100 m	Jürgen Kolenda; West Germany	Sandro Sola; Italy	Giuseppe Galantucci; Italy
Men's 200 m	Jürgen Kolenda; West Germany	Valter Olander; Sweden	Sandro Sola; Italy
Men's 400 m	Giuseppe Galantucci; Italy	Valter Olander; Sweden	Paolo Vandini; Italy
Men's 1500 m	Paolo Vandini; Italy	Giuseppe Galantucci; Italy	Valter Olander; Sweden
Men's 50 m apnea	Jürgen Kolenda; West Germany	Sandro Sola; Italy	Dario Broglia; Italy
Men's 100 m immersion	Jürgen Kolenda; West Germany	Dario Broglia; Italy	Thierry Lasbleye; France
Women's 100 m	Anne Menguy; France	Cristina Covoni; Italy	Anne-Marie Rouchon; France
Women's 200 m	Anne-Marie Rouchon; France	Anne Menguy; France	Marion Collot; France
Women's 400 m	Anne-Marie Rouchon; France	Monica Crovetti; France	Marina Beck; West Germany
Women's 800 m	Anne-Marie Rouchon; France	Marion Collot; France	Monica Crovetti; Italy
Women's 50 m apnea	Cristina Covoni; Italy	Monica Crovetti; Italy	Anne Menguy; France
Women's 100 m immersion	Cristina Covoni; Italy	Anne Menguy; France	Marina Beck; West Germany

== Inline speed skating ==
Event	Gold	Silver	Bronze
Men's track 10000 m	Tom Peterson; United States	Hermes Fossi; Italy	Moreno Bagnolini; Italy
Men's track 20000 m	Scott Constantine; New Zealand	Giuseppe Cruciani; Italy	Moreno Bagnolini; Italy
Men's Marathon	Tom Peterson; United States	Hermes Fossi; Italy	Danny van Deperre; Belgium
Women's track 5000 m	Monica Lucchese; Italy	Paola Sometti; Italy	Annie Lambrechts; Belgium
Women's track 10000 m	Paola Cristofori; Italy	Darlene Kessenger; United States	Annie Lambrechts; Belgium

== Karate ==
Event	Gold	Silver	Bronze
Men's kata	Keji Okada; Japan	Masashi Koyama; Japan	Domingo Llanos; United States
Men's kumite -60 kg	Masayuki Naito; Japan	Fernando Roseuero; Spain	Joe Tierney; Great Britain; Giuseppe Tinnirello; Italy
Men's kumite -65 kg	Yoshikazu Ono; Japan	Toshiaki Maeda; Japan	Robert De Luca; Italy; Kesayoshi Yokouchi; Japan
Men's kumite -70 kg	Cecil Hackett; Great Britain	Bernard Bilicki; France	Yukiyoshi Marutani; Japan; Seiji Nishimura; Japan
Men's kumite -75 kg	Lin Chi-min; Chinese Taipei	Fred Royers; Netherlands	Christian Gouze; France; Ángel López; Spain
Men's kumite -80 kg	Osamu Kamikodo; Japan	Hisao Murase; Japan	Tokey Hill; United States; Otti Roethof; Netherlands
Men's kumite +80 kg	Ludwig Kotzebue; Netherlands	Chen Chien; Chinese Taipei	Claudio Guazzaroni; Italy; Francisco Torres; Spain
Men's kumite open	Vic Charles; Great Britain	Marc Pyrée; France	Billy Blanks; United States; Claude Petinella; France
Women's kata	Susuko Okamura; Japan	Mie Nakayama; Japan	María Moreno; Spain

== Roller figure skating ==
Event	Gold	Silver	Bronze
Men's freeskating	Mike Glatz; United States	Rick Elsworth; United States	Michele Biserni; Italy
Women's freeskating	Anna Conklin; United States	Elena Bonati; Italy	Tina Kneisley; United States
Pairs	Tina Kneisley; Paul Price; United States	Ann Green; Rick Elsworth; United States	Sylvia Gingras; Guy Aubin; Canada
Dance	Holly Valente; William Richardson; United States	Cindy Smith; Mark Howard; United States	Kim Geoghegan; Eamon Geoghegan; Great Britain

== Roller hockey ==
Event	Gold	Silver	Bronze
Men's	Portugal	United States	Argentina

== Softball ==
Event	Gold	Silver	Bronze
Men's	United States	United States II	Canada
Women's	United States	Canada	Bahamas

== Taekwondo ==
Event	Gold	Silver	Bronze
Men's –48 kg	Kwon Ki-Moon; South Korea	Dae-Sung Lee; United States	Aldo Codazzo; Canada; Reinhard Langer; West Germany
Men's –52 kg	Yang Ki-Mo; South Korea	Franco Banito; Spain	Fernando Celada; Mexico; Domenico Maelionico; Italy
Men's –56 kg	Chung Bum-Soo; South Korea	Ooscar Aguilar; Mexico	DiConstanzo Geremia; Italy; Serge Langlois; Canada
Men's –60 kg	Lee Jun-Kul; South Korea	Jorge García; Spain	Juan Mangoni; Argentina; Rafaele Marchione; Italy
Men's –64 kg	Kim Yung-Kuk; South Korea	Alphonse Qahhaar; United States	Luigi Signore; Italy; Kone Sowleymane; Ivory Coast
Men's –68 kg	Kim Jeong-Kuk; South Korea	Paul Rusca; Argentina	Antonio Herande; Mexico; Ruben Rhijs; Netherlands
Men's –73 kg	Oh Il-Nam; South Korea	Chul-Hoe Kim; United States	Helmut Gartner; West Germany; Patrice Remarek; Ivory Coast
Men's –78 kg	Lee Dong-Jun; South Korea	Jersey Long; Canada	Luigi d'Oriano; Italy; Andreas Scheffler; West Germany
Men's –84 kg	Jung Chan; South Korea	Cissé Abouaye; Ivory Coast	Tom Federle; United States; Sun Hsinnien; Chinese Taipei
Men's +84 kg	Darrell Hannegan; Canada	Park Chong-Man; South Korea	Miguel Esquivel; Mexico; Harry Prijs; Netherlands

== Trampoline gymnastics ==
Event	Gold	Silver	Bronze
Men's individual	Yves Milord; Canada	Steve Elliott; United States	Rand Wilson; United States
Men's mini individual	Brett Brown; Canada	Carl Heger; United States	Tim Cleave; Canada
Men's synchro	Carl Heger; Steve Elliott; United States	Paul Rugheimer; Carlos Villarreal; United States	Brett Brown; Alan Gouthier; Canada
Men's individual tumbling	Steve Elliott; United States	Randy Wickstrom; United States	Steve Cooper; United States
Women's individual	Bethany Fairchild; United States	Barbara Letho; United States	Christine Tough; Canada
Women's mini individual	Christine Tough; Canada	Bethany Fairchild; United States	Norma Letho; United States
Women's synchro	Norma Letho; Barbara Letho; United States	Bethany Fairchild; Mary Borkowski; United States	—

== Tug of war ==
Event	Gold	Silver	Bronze
Men's –640 kg	England	Switzerland	Netherlands
Men's –720 kg	Switzerland	Netherlands	England

== Water skiing ==
Event	Gold	Silver	Bronze
Men's slalom	Bob LaPoint; United States	Andy Mapple; Great Britain	Mike Neville; Australia
Men's tricks	Patrice Martin; France	Carl Roberge; United States	Sammy Duvall; United States
Men's jump	Sammy Duvall; United States	Mike Hazelwood; Great Britain	Glen Thurlow; Australia
Men's three event	Sammy Duvall; United States	Carl Roberge; United States	Mike Neville; Australia
Women's slalom	Cindy Benzel; United States	Sue Fieldhouse; Australia	Cindy Todd; United States
Women's tricks	Ana María Carrasco; Venezuela	Karin Roberge; United States	Anita Carlman; Sweden
Women's jump	Marlon van Dijk; Netherlands	Sue Lipplegoes; Australia	Cindy Todd; United States
Women's three event	Ana María Carrasco; Venezuela	Anita Carlman; Sweden	Karin Roberge; United States
