= Major achievements in field hockey by nation =

This article contains lists of achievements in major senior-level international field hockey and indoor field hockey tournaments according to first-place, second-place and third-place results obtained by teams representing different nations. The objective is not to create combined medal tables; the focus is on listing the best positions achieved by teams in major international tournaments, ranking the nations according to the most podiums accomplished by teams of these nations.

== Results ==
For the making of these lists, results from following major international tournaments were consulted:

Form	Governing body	Tournament	Edition		
Form	Governing body	Tournament	First	Latest	Next
Field hockey	FIH & IOC	Field hockey at the Summer Olympics (quadrennially)	1908	2024	2028
Field hockey	FIH	Men's Hockey World Cup (quadrennially)	1971	2026	2030
Field hockey	FIH	Women's Hockey World Cup (quadrennially)	1974	2026	2030
Field hockey	FIH	Hockey Champions Trophy (biennially)	1978	2018	Defunct
Field hockey	FIH	Men's FIH Pro League (annually)	2019	2025–2026	2026–2027
Field hockey	FIH	Women's FIH Pro League (annually)	2019	2025–2026	2026–2027
Field hockey	FIH	Men's FIH Hockey World League (biennially, replaced by the men's FIH Pro League)	2012–2013	2016–2017	Defunct
Field hockey	FIH	Women's FIH Hockey World League (biennially, replaced by the women's FIH Pro League)	2012–2013	2016–2017	Defunct
Indoor field hockey	FIH & IWGA	Indoor hockey at the World Games	2005	2005	Defunct
Indoor field hockey	FIH	Indoor Hockey World Cup (quadrennially)	2003	2025	2029

- FIH: International Hockey Federation
- IOC: International Olympic Committee
- IWGA: International World Games Association

Medals for the demonstration events are NOT counted. Medals earned by athletes from defunct National Olympic Committees (NOCs) or historical teams are NOT merged with the results achieved by their immediate successor states. The International Olympic Committee (IOC) do NOT combine medals of these nations or teams.

The tables are pre-sorted by total number of first-place results, second-place results and third-place results, then most first-place results, second-place results, respectively. When equal ranks are given, nations are listed in alphabetical order.

=== Field hockey and indoor field hockey ===
==== Men and women ====
Last updated after the 2026 Men's FIH Hockey World Cup (As of 30 August 2026)
		Field hockey								Indoor field hockey				Number of			
		Olympic Games		World Cup		Champions Trophy		Pro League / World League		World Games		World Cup		Number of			
Rk.	Nation	Men	Women	Men	Women	Men	Women	Men	Women	Men	Women	Men	Women	1st place, gold medalist(s)	2nd place, silver medalist(s)	3rd place, bronze medalist(s)	Total
1	Germany	1st place, gold medalist(s)	1st place, gold medalist(s)	1st place, gold medalist(s)	3rd place, bronze medalist(s)	1st place, gold medalist(s)	1st place, gold medalist(s)	3rd place, bronze medalist(s)	2nd place, silver medalist(s)	1st place, gold medalist(s)	1st place, gold medalist(s)	1st place, gold medalist(s)	1st place, gold medalist(s)	9	1	2	12
2	Netherlands	1st place, gold medalist(s)	1st place, gold medalist(s)	1st place, gold medalist(s)	1st place, gold medalist(s)	1st place, gold medalist(s)	1st place, gold medalist(s)	1st place, gold medalist(s)	1st place, gold medalist(s)			1st place, gold medalist(s)	1st place, gold medalist(s)	10	0	0	10
3	Australia	1st place, gold medalist(s)	1st place, gold medalist(s)	1st place, gold medalist(s)	1st place, gold medalist(s)	1st place, gold medalist(s)	1st place, gold medalist(s)	1st place, gold medalist(s)	2nd place, silver medalist(s)					7	1	0	8
4	Argentina	1st place, gold medalist(s)	2nd place, silver medalist(s)	3rd place, bronze medalist(s)	1st place, gold medalist(s)	3rd place, bronze medalist(s)	1st place, gold medalist(s)	2nd place, silver medalist(s)	1st place, gold medalist(s)					4	2	2	8
5	Spain	2nd place, silver medalist(s)	1st place, gold medalist(s)	2nd place, silver medalist(s)	3rd place, bronze medalist(s)	1st place, gold medalist(s)		3rd place, bronze medalist(s)				3rd place, bronze medalist(s)	2nd place, silver medalist(s)	2	3	3	8
6	West Germany^{*}	1st place, gold medalist(s)	2nd place, silver medalist(s)	2nd place, silver medalist(s)	1st place, gold medalist(s)	1st place, gold medalist(s)	3rd place, bronze medalist(s)							3	2	1	6
7	Great Britain	1st place, gold medalist(s)	1st place, gold medalist(s)			2nd place, silver medalist(s)	2nd place, silver medalist(s)	2nd place, silver medalist(s)	3rd place, bronze medalist(s)					2	3	1	6
8	Belgium	1st place, gold medalist(s)		1st place, gold medalist(s)	3rd place, bronze medalist(s)			1st place, gold medalist(s)	3rd place, bronze medalist(s)					2	2	2	6
9	South Korea	2nd place, silver medalist(s)	2nd place, silver medalist(s)		3rd place, bronze medalist(s)	2nd place, silver medalist(s)	1st place, gold medalist(s)		3rd place, bronze medalist(s)					1	3	2	6
10	England^{†}			2nd place, silver medalist(s)	3rd place, bronze medalist(s)	2nd place, silver medalist(s)	3rd place, bronze medalist(s)	3rd place, bronze medalist(s)	3rd place, bronze medalist(s)					0	2	4	6
11	India	1st place, gold medalist(s)		1st place, gold medalist(s)		2nd place, silver medalist(s)		3rd place, bronze medalist(s)	3rd place, bronze medalist(s)					2	1	2	5
12	New Zealand	1st place, gold medalist(s)					3rd place, bronze medalist(s)	2nd place, silver medalist(s)	2nd place, silver medalist(s)					1	2	1	4
13	United States	3rd place, bronze medalist(s)	3rd place, bronze medalist(s)		3rd place, bronze medalist(s)		3rd place, bronze medalist(s)							0	0	4	4
14	Pakistan	1st place, gold medalist(s)		1st place, gold medalist(s)		1st place, gold medalist(s)								3	0	0	3
15	China		2nd place, silver medalist(s)		3rd place, bronze medalist(s)		1st place, gold medalist(s)							1	1	1	3
16	Czech Republic									3rd place, bronze medalist(s)	3rd place, bronze medalist(s)		3rd place, bronze medalist(s)	0	0	3	3
16	Soviet Union^{*}	3rd place, bronze medalist(s)	3rd place, bronze medalist(s)		3rd place, bronze medalist(s)									0	0	3	3
18	Austria											1st place, gold medalist(s)	2nd place, silver medalist(s)	1	1	0	2
18	Poland											2nd place, silver medalist(s)	1st place, gold medalist(s)	1	1	0	2
20	Belarus										2nd place, silver medalist(s)		3rd place, bronze medalist(s)	0	1	1	2
21	France											3rd place, bronze medalist(s)	3rd place, bronze medalist(s)	0	0	2	2
22	Zimbabwe		1st place, gold medalist(s)											1	0	0	1
23	Canada				2nd place, silver medalist(s)									0	1	0	1
23	Czechoslovakia^{*}		2nd place, silver medalist(s)											0	1	0	1
23	Denmark	2nd place, silver medalist(s)												0	1	0	1
23	Ireland				2nd place, silver medalist(s)									0	1	0	1
23	Japan	2nd place, silver medalist(s)												0	1	0	1
23	Switzerland									2nd place, silver medalist(s)				0	1	0	1
29	Iran											3rd place, bronze medalist(s)		0	0	1	1
29	South Africa											3rd place, bronze medalist(s)		0	0	1	1
29	Ukraine												3rd place, bronze medalist(s)	0	0	1	1
29	United Team of Germany^{*}	3rd place, bronze medalist(s)												0	0	1	1

^{*}Defunct National Olympic Committees (NOCs) or historical teams are shown in italic.
^{†}Non International Olympic Committee (IOC) members.

==== Men ====
Last updated after the 2026 Men's FIH Hockey World Cup (As of 30 August 2026)
		Field hockey				Indoor field hockey		Number of			
		Olympic Games	World Cup	Champions Trophy	Pro League / World League	World Games	World Cup	Number of			
Rk.	Nation	Men	Men	Men	Men	Men	Men	1st place, gold medalist(s)	2nd place, silver medalist(s)	3rd place, bronze medalist(s)	Total
1	Germany	1st place, gold medalist(s)	1st place, gold medalist(s)	1st place, gold medalist(s)	3rd place, bronze medalist(s)	1st place, gold medalist(s)	1st place, gold medalist(s)	5	0	1	6
2	Netherlands	1st place, gold medalist(s)	1st place, gold medalist(s)	1st place, gold medalist(s)	1st place, gold medalist(s)		1st place, gold medalist(s)	5	0	0	5
3	Spain	2nd place, silver medalist(s)	2nd place, silver medalist(s)	1st place, gold medalist(s)	3rd place, bronze medalist(s)		3rd place, bronze medalist(s)	1	2	2	5
4	Australia	1st place, gold medalist(s)	1st place, gold medalist(s)	1st place, gold medalist(s)	1st place, gold medalist(s)			4	0	0	4
5	India	1st place, gold medalist(s)	1st place, gold medalist(s)	2nd place, silver medalist(s)	3rd place, bronze medalist(s)			2	1	1	4
6	Argentina	1st place, gold medalist(s)	3rd place, bronze medalist(s)	3rd place, bronze medalist(s)	2nd place, silver medalist(s)			1	1	2	4
7	Belgium	1st place, gold medalist(s)	1st place, gold medalist(s)		1st place, gold medalist(s)			3	0	0	3
7	Pakistan	1st place, gold medalist(s)	1st place, gold medalist(s)	1st place, gold medalist(s)				3	0	0	3
9	West Germany^{*}	1st place, gold medalist(s)	2nd place, silver medalist(s)	1st place, gold medalist(s)				2	1	0	3
10	Great Britain	1st place, gold medalist(s)		2nd place, silver medalist(s)	2nd place, silver medalist(s)			1	2	0	3
11	England^{†}		2nd place, silver medalist(s)	2nd place, silver medalist(s)	2nd place, silver medalist(s)			0	3	0	3
12	New Zealand	1st place, gold medalist(s)			2nd place, silver medalist(s)			1	1	0	2
13	South Korea	2nd place, silver medalist(s)		2nd place, silver medalist(s)				0	2	0	2
14	Austria						1st place, gold medalist(s)	1	0	0	1
15	Denmark	2nd place, silver medalist(s)						0	1	0	1
15	Japan	2nd place, silver medalist(s)						0	1	0	1
15	Poland						2nd place, silver medalist(s)	0	1	0	1
15	Switzerland					2nd place, silver medalist(s)		0	1	0	1
19	Czech Republic					3rd place, bronze medalist(s)		0	0	1	1
19	France						3rd place, bronze medalist(s)	0	0	1	1
19	Iran						3rd place, bronze medalist(s)	0	0	1	1
19	South Africa						3rd place, bronze medalist(s)	0	0	1	1
19	Soviet Union^{*}	3rd place, bronze medalist(s)						0	0	1	1
19	United States	3rd place, bronze medalist(s)						0	0	1	1
19	United Team of Germany^{*}	3rd place, bronze medalist(s)						0	0	1	1

^{*}Defunct National Olympic Committees (NOCs) or historical teams are shown in italic.
^{†}Non International Olympic Committee (IOC) members.

==== Women ====
Last updated after the 2026 Women's FIH Hockey World Cup (As of 29 August 2026)
		Field hockey				Indoor field hockey		Number of			
		Olympic Games	World Cup	Champions Trophy	Pro League / World League	World Games	World Cup	Number of			
Rk.	Nation	Women	Women	Women	Women	Women	Women	1st place, gold medalist(s)	2nd place, silver medalist(s)	3rd place, bronze medalist(s)	Total
1	Germany	1st place, gold medalist(s)	3rd place, bronze medalist(s)	1st place, gold medalist(s)	2nd place, silver medalist(s)	1st place, gold medalist(s)	1st place, gold medalist(s)	4	1	1	6
2	Netherlands	1st place, gold medalist(s)	1st place, gold medalist(s)	1st place, gold medalist(s)	1st place, gold medalist(s)		1st place, gold medalist(s)	5	0	0	5
3	Argentina	2nd place, silver medalist(s)	1st place, gold medalist(s)	1st place, gold medalist(s)	1st place, gold medalist(s)			3	1	0	4
3	Australia	1st place, gold medalist(s)	1st place, gold medalist(s)	1st place, gold medalist(s)	2nd place, silver medalist(s)			3	1	0	4
5	South Korea	2nd place, silver medalist(s)	3rd place, bronze medalist(s)	1st place, gold medalist(s)	3rd place, bronze medalist(s)			1	1	2	4
6	China	2nd place, silver medalist(s)	3rd place, bronze medalist(s)	1st place, gold medalist(s)				1	1	1	3
6	Spain	1st place, gold medalist(s)	3rd place, bronze medalist(s)				2nd place, silver medalist(s)	1	1	1	3
6	West Germany^{*}	2nd place, silver medalist(s)	1st place, gold medalist(s)	3rd place, bronze medalist(s)				1	1	1	3
9	England^{†}		3rd place, bronze medalist(s)	3rd place, bronze medalist(s)	3rd place, bronze medalist(s)			0	0	3	3
9	United States	3rd place, bronze medalist(s)	3rd place, bronze medalist(s)	3rd place, bronze medalist(s)				0	0	3	3
11	Great Britain	1st place, gold medalist(s)		2nd place, silver medalist(s)				1	1	0	2
12	Belarus					2nd place, silver medalist(s)	3rd place, bronze medalist(s)	0	1	1	2
12	New Zealand			3rd place, bronze medalist(s)	2nd place, silver medalist(s)			0	1	1	2
14	Belgium		3rd place, bronze medalist(s)		3rd place, bronze medalist(s)			0	0	2	2
14	Czech Republic					3rd place, bronze medalist(s)	3rd place, bronze medalist(s)	0	0	2	2
14	Soviet Union^{*}	3rd place, bronze medalist(s)	3rd place, bronze medalist(s)					0	0	2	2
17	Poland						1st place, gold medalist(s)	1	0	0	1
17	Zimbabwe	1st place, gold medalist(s)						1	0	0	1
19	Canada		2nd place, silver medalist(s)					0	1	0	1
20	Czechoslovakia^{*}	2nd place, silver medalist(s)						0	1	0	1
20	Ireland		2nd place, silver medalist(s)					0	1	0	1
22	France						3rd place, bronze medalist(s)	0	0	1	1
22	India				3rd place, bronze medalist(s)			0	0	1	1
22	Ukraine						3rd place, bronze medalist(s)	0	0	1	1

^{*}Defunct National Olympic Committees (NOCs) or historical teams are shown in italic.
^{†}Non International Olympic Committee (IOC) members.

=== Field hockey ===
==== Men and women ====
Last updated after the 2026 Men's FIH Hockey World Cup (As of 30 August 2026)
		Field hockey								Number of			
		Olympic Games		World Cup		Champions Trophy		Pro League / World League		Number of			
Rk.	Nation	Men	Women	Men	Women	Men	Women	Men	Women	1st place, gold medalist(s)	2nd place, silver medalist(s)	3rd place, bronze medalist(s)	Total
1	Netherlands	1st place, gold medalist(s)	1st place, gold medalist(s)	1st place, gold medalist(s)	1st place, gold medalist(s)	1st place, gold medalist(s)	1st place, gold medalist(s)	1st place, gold medalist(s)	1st place, gold medalist(s)	8	0	0	8
2	Australia	1st place, gold medalist(s)	1st place, gold medalist(s)	1st place, gold medalist(s)	1st place, gold medalist(s)	1st place, gold medalist(s)	1st place, gold medalist(s)	1st place, gold medalist(s)	2nd place, silver medalist(s)	7	1	0	8
3	Germany	1st place, gold medalist(s)	1st place, gold medalist(s)	1st place, gold medalist(s)	3rd place, bronze medalist(s)	1st place, gold medalist(s)	1st place, gold medalist(s)	3rd place, bronze medalist(s)	2nd place, silver medalist(s)	5	1	2	8
4	Argentina	1st place, gold medalist(s)	2nd place, silver medalist(s)	3rd place, bronze medalist(s)	1st place, gold medalist(s)	3rd place, bronze medalist(s)	1st place, gold medalist(s)	2nd place, silver medalist(s)	1st place, gold medalist(s)	4	2	2	8
5	West Germany^{*}	1st place, gold medalist(s)	2nd place, silver medalist(s)	2nd place, silver medalist(s)	1st place, gold medalist(s)	1st place, gold medalist(s)	3rd place, bronze medalist(s)			3	2	1	6
6	Belgium	1st place, gold medalist(s)		1st place, gold medalist(s)	3rd place, bronze medalist(s)			1st place, gold medalist(s)	3rd place, bronze medalist(s)	3	1	2	6
7	Great Britain	1st place, gold medalist(s)	1st place, gold medalist(s)			2nd place, silver medalist(s)	2nd place, silver medalist(s)	2nd place, silver medalist(s)	3rd place, bronze medalist(s)	2	3	1	6
8	Spain	2nd place, silver medalist(s)	1st place, gold medalist(s)	2nd place, silver medalist(s)	3rd place, bronze medalist(s)	1st place, gold medalist(s)		3rd place, bronze medalist(s)		2	2	2	6
9	South Korea	2nd place, silver medalist(s)	2nd place, silver medalist(s)		3rd place, bronze medalist(s)	2nd place, silver medalist(s)	1st place, gold medalist(s)		3rd place, bronze medalist(s)	1	3	2	6
10	England^{†}			2nd place, silver medalist(s)	3rd place, bronze medalist(s)	2nd place, silver medalist(s)	3rd place, bronze medalist(s)	2nd place, silver medalist(s)	3rd place, bronze medalist(s)	0	3	3	6
11	India	1st place, gold medalist(s)		1st place, gold medalist(s)		2nd place, silver medalist(s)		3rd place, bronze medalist(s)	3rd place, bronze medalist(s)	2	1	2	5
12	New Zealand	1st place, gold medalist(s)					3rd place, bronze medalist(s)	2nd place, silver medalist(s)	2nd place, silver medalist(s)	1	2	1	4
13	United States	3rd place, bronze medalist(s)	3rd place, bronze medalist(s)		3rd place, bronze medalist(s)		3rd place, bronze medalist(s)			0	0	4	4
14	Pakistan	1st place, gold medalist(s)		1st place, gold medalist(s)		1st place, gold medalist(s)				3	0	0	3
15	China		2nd place, silver medalist(s)		3rd place, bronze medalist(s)		1st place, gold medalist(s)			1	1	1	3
16	Soviet Union^{*}	3rd place, bronze medalist(s)	3rd place, bronze medalist(s)		3rd place, bronze medalist(s)					0	0	3	3
17	Zimbabwe		1st place, gold medalist(s)							1	0	0	1
18	Canada				2nd place, silver medalist(s)					0	1	0	1
18	Czechoslovakia^{*}		2nd place, silver medalist(s)							0	1	0	1
18	Denmark	2nd place, silver medalist(s)								0	1	0	1
18	Ireland				2nd place, silver medalist(s)					0	1	0	1
18	Japan	2nd place, silver medalist(s)								0	1	0	1
23	United Team of Germany^{*}	3rd place, bronze medalist(s)								0	0	1	1

^{*}Defunct National Olympic Committees (NOCs) or historical teams are shown in italic.
^{†}Non International Olympic Committee (IOC) members.

==== Men ====
Last updated after the 2026 Men's FIH Hockey World Cup (As of 30 August 2026)
		Field hockey				Number of			
		Olympic Games	World Cup	Champions Trophy	Pro League / World League	Number of			
Rk.	Nation	Men	Men	Men	Men	1st place, gold medalist(s)	2nd place, silver medalist(s)	3rd place, bronze medalist(s)	Total
1	Australia	1st place, gold medalist(s)	1st place, gold medalist(s)	1st place, gold medalist(s)	1st place, gold medalist(s)	4	0	0	4
1	Netherlands	1st place, gold medalist(s)	1st place, gold medalist(s)	1st place, gold medalist(s)	1st place, gold medalist(s)	4	0	0	4
3	Germany	1st place, gold medalist(s)	1st place, gold medalist(s)	1st place, gold medalist(s)	3rd place, bronze medalist(s)	3	0	1	4
4	India	1st place, gold medalist(s)	1st place, gold medalist(s)	2nd place, silver medalist(s)	3rd place, bronze medalist(s)	2	1	1	4
5	Spain	2nd place, silver medalist(s)	2nd place, silver medalist(s)	1st place, gold medalist(s)	3rd place, bronze medalist(s)	1	2	1	4
6	Argentina	1st place, gold medalist(s)	3rd place, bronze medalist(s)	3rd place, bronze medalist(s)	2nd place, silver medalist(s)	1	1	2	4
7	Belgium	1st place, gold medalist(s)	1st place, gold medalist(s)		1st place, gold medalist(s)	3	0	0	3
7	Pakistan	1st place, gold medalist(s)	1st place, gold medalist(s)	1st place, gold medalist(s)		3	0	0	3
9	West Germany^{*}	1st place, gold medalist(s)	2nd place, silver medalist(s)	1st place, gold medalist(s)		2	1	0	3
10	Great Britain	1st place, gold medalist(s)		2nd place, silver medalist(s)	2nd place, silver medalist(s)	1	2	0	3
11	England^{†}		2nd place, silver medalist(s)	2nd place, silver medalist(s)	2nd place, silver medalist(s)	0	3	0	3
12	New Zealand	1st place, gold medalist(s)			2nd place, silver medalist(s)	1	1	0	2
13	South Korea	2nd place, silver medalist(s)		2nd place, silver medalist(s)		0	2	0	2
14	Denmark	2nd place, silver medalist(s)				0	1	0	1
14	Japan	2nd place, silver medalist(s)				0	1	0	1
16	Soviet Union^{*}	3rd place, bronze medalist(s)				0	0	1	1
16	United States	3rd place, bronze medalist(s)				0	0	1	1
16	United Team of Germany^{*}	3rd place, bronze medalist(s)				0	0	1	1

^{*}Defunct National Olympic Committees (NOCs) or historical teams are shown in italic.
^{†}Non International Olympic Committee (IOC) members.

==== Women ====
Last updated after the 2026 Women's FIH Hockey World Cup (As of 29 August 2026)
		Field hockey				Number of			
		Olympic Games	World Cup	Champions Trophy	Pro League / World League	Number of			
Rk.	Nation	Women	Women	Women	Women	1st place, gold medalist(s)	2nd place, silver medalist(s)	3rd place, bronze medalist(s)	Total
1	Netherlands	1st place, gold medalist(s)	1st place, gold medalist(s)	1st place, gold medalist(s)	1st place, gold medalist(s)	4	0	0	4
2	Argentina	2nd place, silver medalist(s)	1st place, gold medalist(s)	1st place, gold medalist(s)	1st place, gold medalist(s)	3	1	0	4
2	Australia	1st place, gold medalist(s)	1st place, gold medalist(s)	1st place, gold medalist(s)	2nd place, silver medalist(s)	3	1	0	4
4	Germany	1st place, gold medalist(s)	3rd place, bronze medalist(s)	1st place, gold medalist(s)	2nd place, silver medalist(s)	2	1	1	4
5	South Korea	2nd place, silver medalist(s)	3rd place, bronze medalist(s)	1st place, gold medalist(s)	3rd place, bronze medalist(s)	1	1	2	4
6	China	2nd place, silver medalist(s)	3rd place, bronze medalist(s)	1st place, gold medalist(s)		1	1	1	3
6	Great Britain	1st place, gold medalist(s)		2nd place, silver medalist(s)	3rd place, bronze medalist(s)	1	1	1	3
6	West Germany^{*}	2nd place, silver medalist(s)	1st place, gold medalist(s)	3rd place, bronze medalist(s)		1	1	1	3
9	England^{†}		3rd place, bronze medalist(s)	3rd place, bronze medalist(s)	3rd place, bronze medalist(s)	0	0	3	3
9	United States	3rd place, bronze medalist(s)	3rd place, bronze medalist(s)	3rd place, bronze medalist(s)		0	0	3	3
11	Spain	1st place, gold medalist(s)	3rd place, bronze medalist(s)			1	0	1	2
12	New Zealand			3rd place, bronze medalist(s)	2nd place, silver medalist(s)	0	1	1	2
13	Belgium		3rd place, bronze medalist(s)		3rd place, bronze medalist(s)	0	0	2	2
13	Soviet Union^{*}	3rd place, bronze medalist(s)	3rd place, bronze medalist(s)			0	0	2	2
15	Zimbabwe	1st place, gold medalist(s)				1	0	0	1
16	Canada		2nd place, silver medalist(s)			0	1	0	1
16	Czechoslovakia^{*}	2nd place, silver medalist(s)				0	1	0	1
16	Ireland		2nd place, silver medalist(s)			0	1	0	1
19	India				3rd place, bronze medalist(s)	0	0	1	1

^{*}Defunct National Olympic Committees (NOCs) or historical teams are shown in italic.
^{†}Non International Olympic Committee (IOC) members.

=== Indoor field hockey ===
==== Men and women ====
Last updated after the 2025 Men's Indoor Hockey World Cup (As of 9 February 2025)
		Indoor field hockey				Number of			
		World Games		World Cup		Number of			
Rk.	Nation	Men	Women	Men	Women	1st place, gold medalist(s)	2nd place, silver medalist(s)	3rd place, bronze medalist(s)	Total
1	Germany	1st place, gold medalist(s)	1st place, gold medalist(s)	1st place, gold medalist(s)	1st place, gold medalist(s)	4	0	0	4
2	Czech Republic	3rd place, bronze medalist(s)	3rd place, bronze medalist(s)		3rd place, bronze medalist(s)	0	0	3	3
3	Netherlands			1st place, gold medalist(s)	1st place, gold medalist(s)	2	0	0	2
4	Austria			1st place, gold medalist(s)	2nd place, silver medalist(s)	1	1	0	2
4	Poland			2nd place, silver medalist(s)	1st place, gold medalist(s)	1	1	0	2
6	Belarus		2nd place, silver medalist(s)		3rd place, bronze medalist(s)	0	1	1	2
6	Spain			3rd place, bronze medalist(s)	2nd place, silver medalist(s)	0	1	1	2
8	France			3rd place, bronze medalist(s)	3rd place, bronze medalist(s)	0	0	2	2
9	Switzerland	2nd place, silver medalist(s)				0	1	0	1
10	Iran			3rd place, bronze medalist(s)		0	0	1	1
10	South Africa			3rd place, bronze medalist(s)		0	0	1	1
10	Ukraine				3rd place, bronze medalist(s)	0	0	1	1

==== Men ====
Last updated after the 2025 Men's Indoor Hockey World Cup (As of 9 February 2025)
		Indoor field hockey		Number of			
		World Games	World Cup	Number of			
Rk.	Nation	Men	Men	1st place, gold medalist(s)	2nd place, silver medalist(s)	3rd place, bronze medalist(s)	Total
1	Germany	1st place, gold medalist(s)	1st place, gold medalist(s)	2	0	0	2
2	Austria		1st place, gold medalist(s)	1	0	0	1
2	Netherlands		1st place, gold medalist(s)	1	0	0	1
4	Poland		2nd place, silver medalist(s)	0	1	0	1
4	Switzerland	2nd place, silver medalist(s)		0	1	0	1
6	Czech Republic	3rd place, bronze medalist(s)		0	0	1	1
6	France		3rd place, bronze medalist(s)	0	0	1	1
6	Iran		3rd place, bronze medalist(s)	0	0	1	1
6	South Africa		3rd place, bronze medalist(s)	0	0	1	1
6	Spain		3rd place, bronze medalist(s)	0	0	1	1

==== Women ====
Last updated after the 2025 Women's Indoor Hockey World Cup (As of 9 February 2025)
		Indoor field hockey		Number of			
		World Games	World Cup	Number of			
Rk.	Nation	Women	Women	1st place, gold medalist(s)	2nd place, silver medalist(s)	3rd place, bronze medalist(s)	Total
1	Germany	1st place, gold medalist(s)	1st place, gold medalist(s)	2	0	0	2
2	Belarus	2nd place, silver medalist(s)	3rd place, bronze medalist(s)	0	1	1	2
3	Czech Republic	3rd place, bronze medalist(s)	3rd place, bronze medalist(s)	0	0	2	2
4	Netherlands		1st place, gold medalist(s)	1	0	0	1
4	Poland		1st place, gold medalist(s)	1	0	0	1
6	Austria		2nd place, silver medalist(s)	0	1	0	1
6	Spain		2nd place, silver medalist(s)	0	1	0	1
8	France		3rd place, bronze medalist(s)	0	0	1	1
8	Ukraine		3rd place, bronze medalist(s)	0	0	1	1

== See also ==
- FIH World Rankings
- List of major achievements in sports by nation
