= Casting at the 2001 World Games – Men's multiplier accuracy =

Casting men's multiplier accuracy at the 2001 World Games
- Venue: Akita Prefectural Central Park, Akita, Japan
- Date: 22–24 August 2001
- Competitors: 30 from 10 nations

Medalists
| gold medal | (Germany) Michael Harter |
| silver medal | (United States) Steve Rajeff |
| bronze medal | (Sweden) Henrik Österberg |

The men's multiplier accuracy competition in casting at the 2001 World Games took place from 22 to 24 August 2001 at the Akita Prefectural Central Park in Akita, Japan.

== Competition format ==
A total of 30 athletes entered the competition. Best nine athletes from preliminary round qualifies to the semifinal. From semifinal the best three athletes advances to the final.

== Results ==
=== Preliminary ===
| | | | Round 1 | | Round 2 | | Note |
| Rank | Athlete | Nation | Score | Time | Score | Time | Note |
|---|---|---|---|---|---|---|---|
| 1 | Steve Rajeff | United States | 90 | 5:31 | 100 | 5:22 | Q |
| 2 | Markus Kläusler | Switzerland | 95 | 7:09 | 95 | 7:26 | Q |
| 3 | Frode Semb | Norway | 90 | 7:22 | 100 | 7:02 | Q |
| 4 | Henrik Harjanne | Sweden | 90 | 4:44 | 90 | 4:33 | Q |
| 5 | Michael Harter | Germany | 95 | 5:58 | 75 | 6:20 | Q |
| 6 | Henrik Österberg | Sweden | 80 | 4:12 | 90 | 3:46 | Q |
| 7 | Kenji Okamoto | Japan | 80 | 4:46 | 85 | 3:31 | Q |
| 8 | Bjørn Larsen | Norway | 90 | 6:40 | 75 | 6:22 | Q |
| 9 | Chris Korich | United States | 80 | 8:18 | 90 | 7:21 | Q |
| 10 | Patrik Lexa | Czech Republic | 80 | 6:15 | 75 | 5:58 | |
| 11 | Klaus-Jurgen Bruder | Germany | 75 | 5:49 | 80 | 6:06 | |
| 12 | Kazumi Fukai | Japan | 85 | 4:59 | 70 | 5:27 | |
| 13 | Kuniyasu Tanaka | Japan | 60 | 6:05 | 75 | 5:58 | |
| 14 | Jacek Kuza | Poland | 70 | 7:15 | 75 | 6:53 | |
| 15 | Karol Michalik | Slovakia | 70 | 6:13 | 75 | 7:49 | |
| 16 | Heinz Maire-Hensge | Germany | 70 | 4:49 | 65 | 3:57 | |
| 17 | Tairiku Shirasawa | Japan | 75 | 5:32 | 60 | 6:26 | |
| 18 | Ralf Stein | Germany | 65 | 5:38 | 70 | 5:14 | |
| 19 | Tomáš Lexa | Czech Republic | 70 | 5:47 | 60 | 5:30 | |
| 20 | Mitsuru Ashida | Japan | 70 | 8:43 | 65 | 4:57 | |
| 21 | Jan Luxa | Czech Republic | 40 | 5:58 | 65 | 6:07 | |
| 22 | Yuji Tsukahara | Japan | 55 | 4:37 | 50 | 4:34 | |
| 23 | Włodzimierz Targosz | Poland | 50 | 5:08 | 55 | 5:12 | |
| 24 | Hendrik Papenfuss | South Africa | 35 | 4:05 | 60 | 4:39 | |
| 25 | Jan Meszaros | Slovakia | 55 | 8:59 | 30 | 6:04 | |
| 26 | Jurej Meszaros | Slovakia | 45 | 6:29 | 50 | 6:02 | |
| 27 | Josef Luxa | Czech Republic | 40 | 4:38 | 45 | 4:45 | |
| 28 | Masayuki Ono | Japan | 10 | 4:59 | 50 | 4:44 | |
| 29 | Robert Meszaros | Slovakia | 20 | 8:39 | | | |
| 30 | Sadaki Sato | Japan | DNS | | | | |

=== Semifinal ===
| Rank | Athlete | Nation | Score | Time | Note |
|---|---|---|---|---|---|
| 1 | Henrik Österberg | Sweden | 100 | 3:56 | Q |
| 2 | Steve Rajeff | United States | 100 | 5:05 | Q |
| 3 | Michael Harter | Germany | 100 | 5:42 | Q |
| 4 | Henrik Harjanne | Sweden | 95 | 4:24 | |
| 5 | Frode Semb | Norway | 90 | 6:19 | |
| 6 | Kenji Okamoto | Japan | 85 | 4:18 | |
| 7 | Markus Kläusler | Switzerland | 85 | 5:51 | |
| 8 | Bjørn Larsen | Norway | 80 | 6:33 | |
| 9 | Chris Korich | United States | 75 | 5:46 | |

=== Final ===
| Rank | Athlete | Nation | Score | Time |
|---|---|---|---|---|
| 1st place, gold medalist(s) | Michael Harter | Germany | 95 | 5:16 |
| 2nd place, silver medalist(s) | Steve Rajeff | United States | 95 | 5:29 |
| 3rd place, bronze medalist(s) | Henrik Österberg | Sweden | 90 | 4:57 |
