= Indoor cycling at the World Games =

Indoor cycling, including cycle ball and artistic cycling, were part of the World Games in 1989.

== Medalists ==
=== Cycle ball ===
==== Men ====
Games	Gold	Silver	Bronze
1989 Karlsruhe	West Germany (FRG); Jürgen King; Werner King	Czechoslovakia (TCH); Miroslav Berger; Miroslav Kratochvil	Switzerland (SUI); Martin Zinser; Peter Kern

=== Artistic cycling ===
==== Men ====
===== Singles =====
Games	Gold	Silver	Bronze
1989 Karlsruhe	Harry Bodmer (FRG)	Roland Fleisch (AUT)	Hermann Martens (SUI)

===== Pairs =====
Games	Gold	Silver	Bronze
1989 Karlsruhe	West Germany (FRG); Andreas Weil; Sascha Weil	West Germany (FRG); Jürgen Girschwiler; Andreas Jeker	West Germany (FRG); Markus Bachmann; Dietmar Entner

==== Women ====
===== Singles =====
Games	Gold	Silver	Bronze
1989 Karlsruhe	Heike Marklein (FRG)	Jana Horachková (TCH)	Marianne Martens (SUI)

===== Pairs =====
Games	Gold	Silver	Bronze
1989 Karlsruhe	Portugal (POR); Carmen Carvalho; Ivonne Carvalho	Czechoslovakia (TCH); Edita Jelinková; Lenka Kosová	West Germany (FRG); Martina Heimpel; Hildegard Wahl
