= Boules sports at the World Games =

Boules sports, including boule lyonnaise, pétanque and raffa, were introduced as World Games sports at the World Games 1985 in London.

== Boule Lyonnaise ==
=== Men ===
==== Doubles ====
Games	Gold	Silver	Bronze
2001 Akita	France (FRA); Laurent Duverger; Sébastien Grail	Italy (ITA); Michele Girodanino; Marco Ziraldo	Slovenia (SLO); Gregor Kosir; Zoran Rednak

==== Progressive shooting ====
Games	Gold	Silver	Bronze
2005 Duisburg	Mauro Bunino (ITA)	Fabien Jarnet (FRA)	Jasmin Causevic (SLO)
2009 Kaohsiung	Ales Borcnik (SLO)	Alessandro Longo (ITA)	Sébastien Mourgues (FRA)
2013 Cali	Mauro Roggero (ITA)	Guillaume Abelfo (FRA)	Tomislav Kolobaric (CRO)
2017 Wrocław	Guillaume Abelfo (FRA)	Anže Petrič (SLO)	Li Panpan (CHN)

==== Precision shooting ====
Games	Gold	Silver	Bronze
2005 Duisburg	Markica Dodig (BIH)	Sandro Gulja (CRO)	Frédéric Ascensi (FRA)
2009 Kaohsiung	Gianfranco Santoro (CRO)	Emanuele Ferrero (ITA)	Markica Dodig (BIH)
2013 Cali	Luigi Grattapaglia (ITA)	Zhang Yixin (CHN)	Thomas Allier (FRA)
2017 Wrocław	Nicolas Pretto (ARG)	Pero Ćubela (CRO)	Gregory Chirat (FRA)

=== Women ===
==== Doubles ====
Games	Gold	Silver	Bronze
2001 Akita	France (FRA); Corine Maugiron; Valérie Maugiron	Italy (ITA); Ilenia Pasin; Laura Trova	Slovenia (SLO); Petra Pivk; Nina Sodec

==== Progressive shooting ====
Games	Gold	Silver	Bronze
2005 Duisburg	Ilenia Pasin (ITA)	Wang Mei (CHN)	Magali Billeaud (FRA)
2009 Kaohsiung	Cheng Xiping (CHN)	Laurence Essertel (FRA)	Chiara Soligo (ITA)
2013 Cali	Cheng Xiping (CHN)	Barbara Barthet (FRA)	Giorgia Rebora (ITA)
2017 Wrocław	Barbara Barthet (FRA)	Wang Yang (CHN)	Serena Traversa (ITA)

==== Precision shooting ====
Games	Gold	Silver	Bronze
2005 Duisburg	Fatiha Targhaoui (MAR)	Corine Maugiron (FRA)	Tanja Gobo (CRO)
2009 Kaohsiung	Yang Ying (CHN)	Magali Jouve (FRA)	Paola Mandola (ITA)
2013 Cali	Iva Vlahek (CRO)	Gaelle Millet (FRA)	Romina Soledad Bolatti (ARG)
2017 Wrocław	Guo Xiaomin (CHN)	Suzy Marie (FRA)	Laura Skoberne (SLO)

== Pétanque ==
=== Men ===
==== Precision shooting ====
Games	Gold	Silver	Bronze
2017 Wrocław	Henri Lacroix (FRA)	Thanakorn Sangkaew (THA)	Diego Rizzi (ITA)

==== Doubles ====
Games	Gold	Silver	Bronze
2009 Kaohsiung	France (FRA); Damien Hureau; Julien Lamour	Belgium (BEL); Fabrice Uytterhoeven; William van der Biest	Thailand (THA); Pakin Phukram; Supan Thongphoo
2013 Cali	France (FRA); Henri Lacroix; Dylan Rocher	Thailand (THA); Thaloengkiat Phusa-At; Lacsukan Piachan	Belgium (BEL); Jean-Francois Hemon; Steven Ielegems
2017 Wrocław	Italy (ITA); Fabio Dutto; Diego Rizzi	Thailand (THA); Thanakorn Sangkaew; Sarawut Sriboonpeng	Spain (ESP); Enrique Catalan; Manuel Romero

==== Triples ====
Games	Gold	Silver	Bronze
1985 London	France (FRA)	Italy (ITA)	Monaco (MON)
1989 Karlsruhe	France (FRA)	Algeria (ALG)	Luxembourg (LUX)
1993 The Hague	France (FRA)	Belgium (BEL)	Denmark (DEN)
1997 Lahti	Spain (ESP)	Italy (ITA)	France (FRA)
2001 Akita	Italy (ITA); Stefano Bruno; Fabio Dutto; Paolo Lerda	Spain (ESP); José Luis Delgado; José Joaquín Romero; Antonio López	Belgium (BEL); André Lozano; Michel Vancampenhout; Charles Weibel
2005 Duisburg	France (FRA); Simon Cortes; Sylvain Dubreuil; Sylvain Pilewski	Madagascar (MAD); Michel Rakotomalala; Jean Randrianandrasana; Sylvain Rakotoarivelo	Belgium (BEL); André Lozano; Charles Weibel; Michel Vancampenhout

=== Women ===
==== Precision shooting ====
Games	Gold	Silver	Bronze
2017 Wrocław	Caroline Bourriaud (FRA)	Nantawan Fueangsanit (THA)	Chao Guijin (CHN)

==== Doubles ====
Games	Gold	Silver	Bronze
1989 Karlsruhe	Belgium (BEL)	Great Britain (GBR)	Spain (ESP)
1993 The Hague	France (FRA)	Sweden (SWE)	Germany (GER)
1997 Lahti	Belgium (BEL)	France (FRA)	Spain (ESP)
2001 Akita	Belgium (BEL); Nancy Barzin; Linda Goblet	Spain (ESP); Ines Rosário; María Luisa Ruiz	Madagascar (MAD); Hanta Randriambahiny; Odile Razanamahefa
2009 Kaohsiung	Thailand (THA); Kannika Limwanich; Suphannee Wongsut	France (FRA); Nadége Baussian; Ranya Kouadri	Israel (ISR); Margalit Ossi; Gali Shriki
2013 Cali	France (FRA); Ludivine D'Isidoro; Marie-Christine Virebayre	Thailand (THA); Thongsri Thamakord; Phantipha Wongchuvej	Canada (CAN); Maryse Bergeron; Marieke Rolland
2017 Wrocław	Thailand (THA); Nantawan Fueangsanit; Phantipha Wongchuvej	Belgium (BEL); Nancy Barzin; Camille Max	France (FRA); Caroline Bourriaud; Anne Maillard

==== Triples ====
Games	Gold	Silver	Bronze
2005 Duisburg	France (FRA); Cynthia Quennehen; Ingrid d'Introno; Chantal Salaris	Thailand (THA); Phantipha Wongchuvej; Noknoi Youngcham; Thongsri Thamakord	Germany (GER); Lara Eble; Gudrun Deterding; Daniela Thelen

== Raffa ==
=== Men ===
==== Doubles ====
Games	Gold	Silver	Bronze
2009 Kaohsiung	Italy (ITA); Pasquale d'Alterio; Gianluca Formicone	Argentina (ARG); Raúl Basualdo; Horacio Francisco Spessot	Brazil (BRA); Milton Schmitz; Rafael Vanz Borges
2013 Cali	Italy (ITA); Andrea Cappelacci; Giuliano Di Nicola	Chile (CHI); Aldo Cesar Bavestrello Sturla; Rodolfo Samuel Galvez Monsalve	Argentina (ARG); Raúl Basualdo; Horacio Francisco Spessot
2017 Wrocław	Italy (ITA); Giuliano Di Nicola; Gianluca Formicone	San Marino (SMR); Enrico Dall'Olmo; Jacopo Frisoni	Austria (AUT); Günther Baur; Philipp Wolfgang

=== Women ===
==== Doubles ====
Games	Gold	Silver	Bronze
2009 Kaohsiung	Italy (ITA); Loana Capelli; Elisa Luccarini	Brazil (BRA); Noeli Dalla Corte; Ingrid Fuchter	Turkey (TUR); Deniz Demir; Rukiye Yüksel
2013 Cali	China (CHN); Cen Weifei; Zhang Wei	Argentina (ARG); Natalia Alejandra Limardo; Maria Victoria Maiz	Brazil (BRA); Noeli Dalla Corte; Ingrid Fuchter
2017 Wrocław	Argentina (ARG); Romina Bolatti; María Victoria Maíz	Brazil (BRA); Noeli Dalla Corte; Ana Caroline Martins	China (CHN); Cen Wefei; Zhang Wei
