= Casting at the World Games =

Casting Sport was part of all World Games until 2005 except in 1989. It was then dropped as the International World Games Association wants the International Casting Sport Federation to come up with new and improved event formats.

== Medalists ==
=== Men ===
==== Fly Accuracy ====
Games	Gold	Silver	Bronze
1981 Santa Clara	Harald Mæhle (NOR)	Chris Korich (USA)	Erwin Meindl (AUT)
1985 London	Ola Spang (SWE)	Steve Rajeff (USA)	Chris Korich (USA)
1993 The Hague	Hywell Morgan (GBR)	Wiebold Visser (GER)	Knut Meel (NOR)
1997 Lahti	Thomas Maire (GER)	Werner Gattermaier (AUT)	Frode Semb (NOR)
2001 Akita	Henrik Österberg (SWE)	Henrik Harjanne (SWE)	Jan Luxa (CZE)
2005 Duisburg	Patrik Lexa (CZE)	Iwana Inukai (JPN)	Janusz Paprzycki (POL)

==== Fly Distance Single Handed ====
Games	Gold	Silver	Bronze
1981 Santa Clara	Steve Rajeff (USA)	Martin Hayes (AUS)	Øyvind Førland (NOR)
1985 London	Steve Rajeff (USA)	Hywell Morgan (GBR)	Øyvind Førland (NOR)
1993 The Hague	Thomas Maire (GER)	Patrik Lexa (CZE)	Olaf Christensen (NOR)
1997 Lahti	Slaveyko Slaveykov (CAN)	Robert Meszaros (SVK)	Patrik Lexa (CZE)
2001 Akita	Jacek Kuza (POL)	Jan Luxa (CZE)	Henrik Österberg (SWE)
2005 Duisburg	Wlodzimierz Targosz (POL)	Steve Rajeff (USA)	Henry Mittel (USA)

==== Fly Distance Double Handed ====
Games	Gold	Silver	Bronze
1981 Santa Clara	Steve Rajeff (USA)	Chris Korich (USA)	Øyvind Førland (NOR)
1985 London	Steve Rajeff (USA)	Øyvind Førland (NOR)	Peter Hässig (SUI)
1993 The Hague	Thomas Maire (GER)	Wiebold Visser (GER)	Patrik Lexa (CZE)

==== Spinning Accuracy Arenberg Target ====
Games	Gold	Silver	Bronze
1981 Santa Clara	Guido Vinck (BEL)	Harald Mæhle (NOR)	Steve Rajeff (USA)
1985 London	Øyvind Førland (NOR)	Ulf Janson (SWE)	Chris Korich (USA)
1993 The Hague	Bjørn Roger Larsen (NOR)	Olaf Christensen (NOR)	Henrik Österberg (SWE)
1997 Lahti	Patrik Lexa (CZE)	Henrik Harjanne (SWE)	Josef Luxa (CZE)
2005 Duisburg	Marko Popovic (CRO)	Klaus-Jürgen Bruder (GER)	Jan Luxa (CZE)

==== Spinning Accuracy ====
Games	Gold	Silver	Bronze
1981 Santa Clara	Øyvind Førland (NOR)	Tom Martens (NED)	Helmut Hochwartner (AUT)
1993 The Hague	Henrik Österberg (SWE)	Heinz Maire-Hensge (GER)	Steve Rajeff (USA)
1997 Lahti	Patrik Lexa (CZE)	Thomas Maire (GER)	Jan Meszaros (SVK)

==== Spinning Distance Single Handed ====
Games	Gold	Silver	Bronze
1981 Santa Clara	Ernst Rohatsch (AUT)	Peter Kläusler (SUI)	Steve Rajeff (USA)
1985 London	Freddy Grüniger (SUI)	Øyvind Førland (NOR)	Ørnulf Hegge (NOR)
1993 The Hague	Knut Meel (NOR)	Chris Korich (USA)	Harvey Beck (CAN)
1997 Lahti	Jan Meszaros (SVK)	Thomas Maire (GER)	Patrik Lexa (CZE)

==== Spinning Distance Double Handed ====
Games	Gold	Silver	Bronze
1981 Santa Clara	Chris Korich (USA)	Helmut Hochwartner (AUT)	Kevin Carriero (USA)
1985 London	Martin Dirks (FRG)	Ørnulf Hegge (NOR)	Øyvind Førland (NOR)

==== Multiplier Accuracy ====
Games	Gold	Silver	Bronze
1981 Santa Clara	Øyvind Førland (NOR)	Chris Korich (USA)	Zack Willson (USA)
1985 London	Øyvind Førland (NOR)	Steve Rajeff (USA)	Ørnulf Hegge (NOR)
1993 The Hague	Steve Rajeff (USA)	Chris Korich (USA)	Henrik Österberg (SWE)
1997 Lahti	Steve Rajeff (USA)	Henrik Österberg (SWE)	Harvey Beck (CAN)
2001 Akita	Michael Harter (GER)	Steve Rajeff (USA)	Henrik Österberg (SWE)

==== Multiplier Distance Single Handed ====
Games	Gold	Silver	Bronze
1981 Santa Clara	Steve Rajeff (USA)	Chris Korich (USA)	Zack Willson (USA)

==== Multiplier Distance Double Handed ====
Games	Gold	Silver	Bronze
1981 Santa Clara	Chris Korich (USA)	Art Walker (CAN)	Keith Pryor (USA)

==== All-round (Combination #1-10) ====
Games	Gold	Silver	Bronze
1981 Santa Clara	Steve Rajeff (USA)	Tim Rajeff (USA)	Oeyvind Foerland (NOR)

=== Women ===
==== Fly Accuracy ====
Games	Gold	Silver	Bronze
1985 London	Lise-Lotte Kristiansson (SWE)	Bente Skyrud (NOR)	Annika Christersson (SWE)
1993 The Hague	Tina Bagge (GER)	Michaela Krizová (CZE)	Bente Skyrud (NOR)
1997 Lahti	Hana Tupa (CZE)	Michaela Krizová (CZE)	Kathrin Ernst (GER)
2001 Akita	Jana Maisel (GER)	Alena Zinner (AUT)	Zuzana Kocirová (CZE)
2005 Duisburg	Jana Maisel (GER)	Alena Zinner (AUT)	Monika Talar (POL)

==== Fly Distance Single Handed ====
Games	Gold	Silver	Bronze
1985 London	Annika Christersson (SWE)	Lise-Lotte Kristiansson (SWE)	Ursula Veltrup (FRG)
1993 The Hague	Michaela Krizová (CZE)	Kathrin Werner (GER)	Bente Skyrud (NOR)
1997 Lahti	Michaela Krizová (CZE)	Hana Tupa (CZE)	Ewa Borowska (POL)
2001 Akita	Kathrin Ernst (GER)	Tina Gerlach (GER)	Alena Zinner (AUT)
2005 Duisburg	Alena Zinner (AUT)	Zuzana Kocirová (CZE)	Kathrin Ernst (GER)

==== Spinning Accuracy Arenberg Target ====
Games	Gold	Silver	Bronze
1985 London	Lise-Lotte Kristiansson (SWE)	Annika Christersson (SWE)	Bente Skyrud (NOR)
1993 The Hague	Michaela Krizová (CZE)	Bente Skyrud (NOR)	Kathrin Werner (GER)
1997 Lahti	Annika Janson (SWE)	Michaela Krizová (CZE)	Marianne Kosonen (FIN)
2005 Duisburg	Jana Maisel (GER)	Jana Broncková (CZE)	Zuzana Kocirová (CZE)

==== Spinning Accuracy ====
Games	Gold	Silver	Bronze
1993 The Hague	Kathrin Werner (GER)	Mona Warntrop (SWE)	Michaela Krizová (CZE)
1997 Lahti	Kathrin Ernst (GER)	Michaela Krizová (CZE)	Brenda Banks (CAN)

==== Spinning Distance Single Handed ====
Games	Gold	Silver	Bronze
1985 London	Lise-Lotte Kristiansson (SWE)	Annika Christersson (SWE)	Ursula Veltrup (FRG)
1993 The Hague	Bente Skyrud (NOR)	Tina Bagge (GER)	Kathrin Werner (GER)
1997 Lahti	unknown (GER)	unknown (CZE)	Marianne Kosonen (FIN)

==== Multiplier Accuracy ====
Games	Gold	Silver	Bronze
1985 London	Annika Christersson (SWE)	Brenda MacSporran (CAN)	Ursula Veltrup (FRG)
1993 The Hague	Mona Warntorp (SWE)	Tina Bagge (GER)	Bente Skyrud (NOR)
1997 Lahti	Brenda Banks (CAN)	Marianne Kosonen (FIN)	Annika Janson (SWE)
2001 Akita	Jana Maisel (GER)	Tina Gerlach (GER)	Kathrin Ernst (GER)
