= 2029 World Games =

Multi-sport event in Karlsruhe, Germany

- Host city: Karlsruhe, Germany
- Events: 36 sports
- Opening: 19 July 2029
- Closing: 29 July 2029
- Website: https://twg2029.com

The 2029 World Games, also known as Karlsruhe 2029, is an upcoming international multi-sport event held from 19–29 July, 2029, in Karlsruhe, Germany. They will be the 13th edition of the World Games, a multi-sport event featuring disciplines of Olympic sports and other competitions that are not currently contested at the Olympic Games.

Karlsruhe previously hosted the 1989 World Games, making this the first time the World Games has been hosted in the same city twice, and the third time Germany has hosted the World Games, after the 2005 Games in Duisburg.

== Bidding process ==
The German Olympic Sports Confederation nominated Karlsruhe to host the 2029 World Games. On 1 May 2024, the International World Games Association awarded the Games to Karlsruhe.

== Development and preparations ==
=== Venues ===
Organisers plan to entirely use existing or already planned venues, spread across five clusters, including the Festplatz, Kongresszentrum Karlsruhe, Messe Karlsruhe, Rheinhäfen Karlsruhe, and other venues across the city.

== The Games ==
=== Sports ===
36 sports, comprising 62 disciplines, had been chosen for the 2029 World Games.

On 25 April 2026, the initial list of sports was officially announced by the International World Games Association. An additional four sports (bowling, racquetball, sambo and softball) were under consideration, but were eventually not selected.

On 3 September 2026, the final sports programme was announced. For the first time, air badminton, baseball5, and hockey5s will be represented at The World Games. In the sector of parasports, para canoe marathon, paraclimbing and para karate will make their debut. Indoor cycling and miniature golf will return for the first time since 1989, when Karlsruhe last hosted the Games. Sumo, rhythmic gymnastics, skydiving, and water skiing will return for the first time since 2022; sumo was dropped from the 2025 program due to issues during competition. Six sports and disciplines from the previous edition of The World Games were dropped: dragon boat, drone racing, powerboating, racquetball, sambo and softball.

The number of medal events and discipline quotas will be announced on 14 January 2027.

- Air badminton ^{B}
- Air sports ^{T}
- Archery ^{P}
- Baseball5 ^{B}
- Beach handball ^{B}
- Billiard sports
  - Carom ^{P}
  - Pool ^{P}
  - Snooker ^{P}
- Boules sports ^{P}
- Canoe sports
  - Canoe marathon ^{R}
  - Canoe polo ^{B}
- Cheerleading ^{AD}
- Dancesport ^{AD}
- Duathlon ^{R}
- Fistball ^{B}
- Flag football ^{B}
- Floorball ^{B}
- Flying disc ^{T}
- Gymnastics
  - Acrobatic gymnastics ^{AD}
  - Aerobic gymnastics ^{AD}
  - Parkour ^{AD}
  - Rhythmic gymnastics ^{AD}
  - Trampoline gymnastics ^{AD}
- Hockey5s ^{B}
- Indoor cycling ^{AD/B}
- Ju-jitsu ^{M}
- Karate ^{M}
- Kickboxing ^{M}
- Korfball ^{B}
- Lacrosse ^{B}
- Lifesaving ^{R}
- Miniature golf ^{P}
- Muaythai ^{M}
- Orienteering ^{R}
- Powerlifting ^{S}
- Roller speed skating ^{R}
- Sport climbing ^{T}
- Squash ^{B}
- Sumo ^{M}
- Tug of war ^{S}
- Underwater sports
  - Finswimming ^{R}
  - Freediving ^{R}
- Water skiing ^{T}
- Wushu ^{M}

AD: Artistic and Dance sports
B: Ball sports
M: Martial arts
P: Precision sports
R: Racing sports
S: Strength sports
T: Trend sports
