= Steve Rajeff =

American fly caster and fisherman

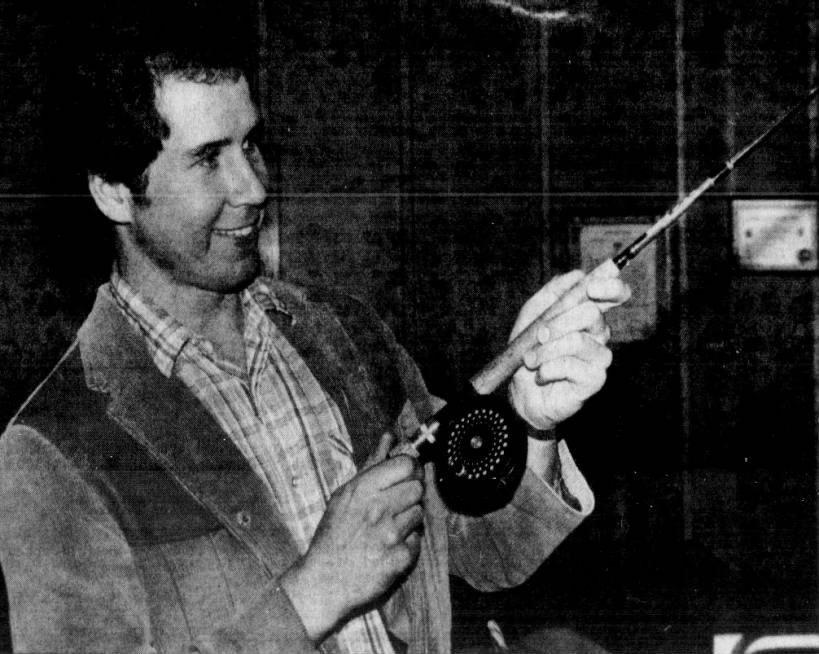
- Rajeff in 1982

Personal information
- Born: 1956 or 1957 (age 69–70)
- Relative: Tim Rajeff (brother)

Sport
- Country: United States
- Sport: Casting
Medal record
Representing United States
World Games
Casting
Gold medal – first place	1981 Santa Clara	Men's fly distance single handed
Gold medal – first place	1981 Santa Clara	Men's fly distance double handed
Gold medal – first place	1981 Santa Clara	Men's multiplier distance single handed
Gold medal – first place	1981 Santa Clara	Men's all-round (combination #1-10)
Bronze medal – third place	1981 Santa Clara	Men's spinning accuracy arenberg target
Bronze medal – third place	1981 Santa Clara	Men's spinning distance single handed
Gold medal – first place	1985 London	Men's fly distance single handed
Gold medal – first place	1985 London	Men's fly distance double handed
Silver medal – second place	1985 London	Men's fly accuracy
Silver medal – second place	1985 London	Men's multiplier accuracy
Gold medal – first place	1993 The Hague	Men's multiplier accuracy
Bronze medal – third place	1993 The Hague	Men's spinning accuracy
Gold medal – first place	1997 Lahti	Men's multiplier accuracy
Silver medal – second place	2001 Akita	Men's multiplier accuracy
Silver medal – second place	2005 Duisburg	Men's distance single handed

Steve Rajeff (born 1956/1957) is an American fly caster and fisherman. He won multiple medals in casting at the World Games between 1981 to 2005.

In addition to his World Games medals, Rajeff also won 46 consecutive American Casting Association all-around titles, as well as 14 all-around titles at the World Casting Championships.
