= Roller hockey at the World Games =

- Founded: 1981
- Region: International
- Current champions: Portugal (4th title)
- Most successful team(s): Portugal (4 titles)

Roller Hockey was introduced as a World Games sport for men at the 1981 World Games in Santa Clara. In 2005 it was replaced by Inline hockey.

== Medalists ==
=== Men ===
Games	Gold	Silver	Bronze
1981 Santa Clara	Portugal	United States	Argentina
1985 London	Italy	United States	Portugal
1989 Karlsruhe	Portugal	Spain	Italy
1993 The Hague	Portugal	Argentina	Spain
2001 Akita	Portugal	Brazil	Germany

== Medal table ==
Rank	Nation	Gold	Silver	Bronze	Total
1	Portugal	4	0	1	5
2	Italy (ITA)	1	0	1	2
3	United States (USA)	0	2	0	2
4	Argentina (ARG)	0	1	1	2
4	Spain (ESP)	0	1	1	2
6	Brazil (BRA)	0	1	0	1
7	Germany (GER)	0	0	1	1
Totals (7 entries)		5	5	5	15

== See also ==
- Roller hockey at the Summer Olympics
- Inline hockey at the World Games
