= Tim Rajeff =

American fly caster and fisherman

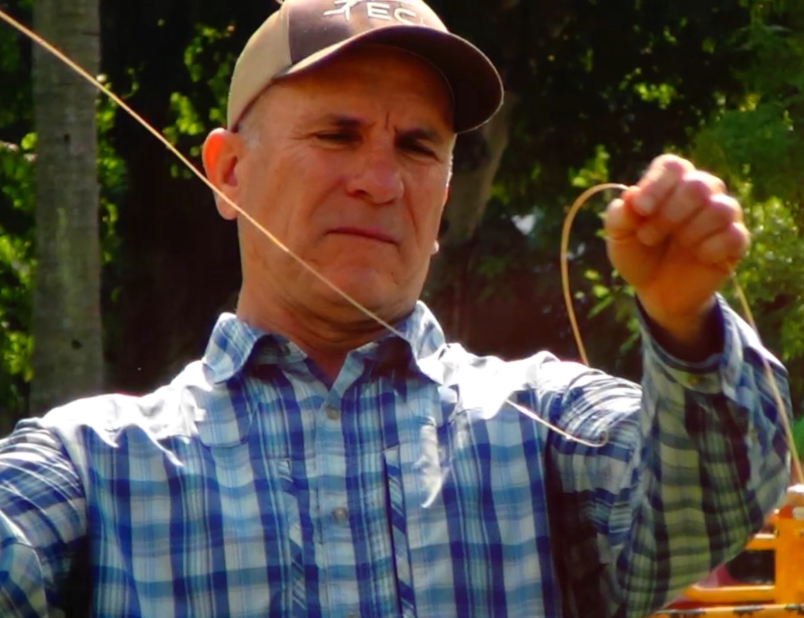
- Rajeff in 2019

Personal information
- Relative: Steve Rajeff (brother)

Sport
- Country: United States
- Sport: Casting
Medal record
Representing United States
World Games
Casting
Silver medal – second place	1981 Santa Clara	Men's all-round (combination #1-10)

Tim Rajeff is an American fly caster and fisherman. He competed at the 1981 World Games, winning the silver medal in the men's all round (combination #1-10) event.
