= Inline hockey at the World Games =

Sport introduced to the World Games 2005 in Duisburg

Inline hockey was introduced as a World Games sport for men at the World Games 2005 in Duisburg where it replaced roller hockey.

== Medalists ==
=== Men ===
Games	Gold	Silver	Bronze
2005 Duisburg	United States (USA)	Canada (CAN)	Switzerland (SUI)
2009 Kaohsiung	United States (USA)	France (FRA)	Czech Republic (CZE)
2013 Cali	United States (USA)	Italy (ITA)	Czech Republic (CZE)
2017 Wrocław	Czech Republic (CZE)	France (FRA)	Switzerland (SUI)
2022 Birmingham	United States (USA)	Czech Republic (CZE)	France (FRA)
2025 Chengdu	United States (USA)	Czech Republic (CZE)	France (FRA)

== See also ==
- Roller hockey at the World Games
- FIRS Inline Hockey World Championships
- IIHF Inline Hockey World Championship
