= Indoor hockey at the World Games =

Indoor field hockey was contested at the 2005 World Games as an invitational sport. It has not been contested in any edition of the World Games ever since.

== Medalists ==
=== Men ===
Games	Gold	Silver	Bronze
2005 Duisburg	Germany (GER)	Switzerland (SUI)	Czech Republic (CZE)

=== Women ===
Games	Gold	Silver	Bronze
2005 Duisburg	Germany (GER)	Belarus (BLR)	Czech Republic (CZE)

== Men's tournament ==
Year	Host	Gold Medal Match			Bronze Medal Match		
Year	Host	Gold	Score	Silver	Bronze	Score	Fourth place
2005; Details	(Germany); Duisburg	Germany	5 – 2	Switzerland	Czech Republic	7 – 1	Canada

== Women's tournament ==
Year	Host	Gold Medal Match			Bronze Medal Match		
Year	Host	Gold	Score	Silver	Bronze	Score	Fourth place
2005; Details	(Germany); Duisburg	Germany	10 – 2	Belarus	Czech Republic	3 – 1	Lithuania

== See also ==
- Indoor Hockey World Cup
