= World Games =

Recurring international multi-sport event

The World Games
- Purpose: To conduct multi-sport events for sports and disciplines that are not contested in the Olympic Games
- Frequency: Every 4 years
- Inaugurated: 1981 – Santa Clara, California, US
- Most recent: 2025 – Chengdu, Sichuan, China
- Next event: 2029 – Karlsruhe, Baden-Württemberg, Germany
- Headquarters: Lausanne, Switzerland
- Website: theworldgames.org

The World Games are an international multi-sport event comprising sports and sporting disciplines that are not contested in the Olympic Games. They are usually held every four years, one year after a Summer Olympic Games, over the course of 11 days. The World Games are governed by the International World Games Association, under the patronage of the International Olympic Committee.

In the most recent editions, between 25 and 34 sports have been included in the official programme. Several sports or disciplines that were on the programme of The World Games have been discontinued because they are now included in the programme of the Olympic Games. Around 3,500 participants from around 100 nations take part.

The World Games differs from other multi-sport events, such as the Olympic Games, in that host cities are not required to construct new venues or facilities for the Games. The competitors are selected by the sports' international federations, rather than by National Olympic Committees or national governing bodies. In most disciplines, qualification is by a top ranking at the world championships or a qualification tournament. This is intended to ensure the top athletes in a sport compete at the Games.

The first edition of The World Games was held in 1981 in Santa Clara, California, United States, and the twelfth edition was held in Chengdu, China, from 7 to 17 August 2025.

== History ==
=== Inauguration ===
The idea for a multi-sport event for non-Olympic sports came from the General Association of International Sports Federations (GAISF). Realising that there were few opportunities to become part of the Olympic programme, non-Olympic federations wanted to form their own showcase event to increase the publicity of their sports, which they called The World Games. These federations formed a steering group in early 1979 to decide on the structure and principles of the games and search for a venue.

In May 1979, the steering group announced that they had found a venue for the first event: Santa Clara, California, United States.

The GAISF steering committee became the World Games Executive Council in October 1979, and the inaugural meeting of the World Games Council was held from 19 to 22 May 1980, with a purpose of creating the concept of the Games. The World Games Council was renamed the International World Games Association, or IWGA in 1985.

The first edition of The World Games was held in Santa Clara, California, in 1981. It was opened by Kim Un-yong, president of the World Games executive committee, at Buck Shaw Stadium. At the opening ceremony, the athletes marched sorted by sport and not by nation.

The 15 sports at the inaugural games included badminton, casting, racquetball, and taekwondo. The first medals of the Games were awarded in the 640 kilo class of tug-of-war, with the gold going to the team from England.

=== Twentieth century ===
After the inaugural Games, the West Nally Group, which had provided financing for the Games in Santa Clara, became owners of the rights to the event, and took the second edition to their headquarters in London.

For the third Games in Karlsruhe, 1989, the West Nally Group still owned the commercial rights to the Games, but the host city was responsible for the staff and volunteers organising the event. After this, the IWGA bought back the commercial rights, and the organising committees of the host cities have been responsible for the organisation and financing since. This led to the organisers of The World Games in The Hague (1993) asking the participants to pay accommodation costs.

The 1997 edition of the Games was due to be held in Port Elizabeth, South Africa, but in August 1994, Port Elizabeth pulled out of hosting the Games due to the political situation in the country. Lahti in Finland volunteered to host instead and signed the host contract in January 1995. Airsports, dancesport, aerobics and jujitsu made their debut in Lahti and have been contested at the Games ever since.

Following the Games in Lahti, the IWGA and IOC agreed on a memorandum of understanding, which was signed in 2000 Here, the IOC recognised the importance of The World Games and set out shared values, including the IOC providing patronage to Organising Committees, encouraging multi-sport national teams, and working together on anti-doping. It also set out that "disciplines/events of sport that are not on the Olympic Games programme could be included on the programme of the World Games". A further memorandum of understanding was signed in 2016.

=== Twenty-first century ===
In 2001, the Games were held in Akita, Japan – the first time it had been held outside of North America or Europe. Several competitions were delayed or moved to an alternative venue when a typhoon hit the city. For the first time, some National Olympic Committees organised hotel accommodation for their athletes, beyond the time they were hosted by the IWGA.

The World Games in 2005, in Duisburg, Germany, were the first World Games where athletes paraded into the opening ceremony grouped by nation. Also several standards were set in place which continue to this day, such as the television production of all sports and sports grouped by category, such as ball sports and precision sports.

The 2013 Games in Cali, Colombia, were particularly noted for the large numbers of spectators, estimated at 500,000. For example, the Bullfight Ring, which was the venue for dancesport, was 'packed' for the salsa dance finals. This edition of the Games saw the first time a competition was cancelled: due to concerns about temperature and air flow at the Del Pueblo Gymnasium, where the sport of rhythmic gymnastics was taking place, the ribbons event was cancelled.

The 2017 Games in Wrocław, Poland, were the first to be broadcast on the Olympic Channel, to 130 countries. Both the raffa and lyonnaise disciplines of boules were cancelled after a storm destroyed the venue and it could not be repaired in time.

In 2015, it was announced that the 11th edition of The World Games was to be held in Birmingham, Alabama, US, in 2021, beating bids from Lima in Peru and Ufa in Russia. On 2 April 2020, the Games were postponed to 2022 so as not to clash with the postponement of the 2020 Olympic Games in Tokyo due to the coronavirus pandemic.

No parasports federations are currently part of the IWGA, but The World Games in Birmingham was the first edition to include parasports, with the inclusion of wheelchair rugby. Birmingham was also to include disabled athletes (one per gender) in archery. The IWGA is also aiming to secure a partnership with the International Paralympic Committee and include a quota for para-athletes.

In 2019, it was announced that The World Games in 2025 will take place in Chengdu, China.

== Features ==
=== Venues ===
In order for hosting to be sustainable, organisers of The World Games are not required to build any new venues or facilities. For example, Sloss Furnaces, a former pig iron-producing blast furnace now in public use, hosted the sport climbing, breakdancing, parkour and beach handball competitions in Birmingham 2022. Athletes stayed at the student accommodations of the University of Alabama at Birmingham (UAB), several of whose sports facilities were used for various events.

Past venues have included the Lahti City Theatre (bodybuilding), Landschaftspark Nord (a former iron foundry in Duisburg), Wrocław Zoo, and Wrocław's Philharmonic Hall, the National Forum of Music.

Even though it is not required, some venues are constructed or renovated for The World Games. For instance, for the 2017 World Games in Wrocław, a new swimming pool and speed skating rink were built, and Olympic Stadium, built in 1928, was renovated and is still used for American football and speedway. Also, for the 2009 World Games, Kaohsiung built a National Stadium – the first stadium in the world to use solar energy technology for its power. Other editions used new facilities that were built for purposes other than the World Games; the main stadium of the 2022 edition, Protective Stadium, was built for UAB's American football team.

=== Athlete selection ===
Athletes are selected to compete at The World Games by their sport's international federation, as opposed to their sport's national governing body or National Olympic Committee, as in other multi-sport events. The selections are intended to "achieve a satisfactory balance between competitors' positions on world ranking lists and the fair representation of as many as possible of its member nations".

International federations are obliged to send their best athletes, with The World Games development agenda setting out that sports are only to be included if "the best athletes/teams in the world are present".

== International World Games Association ==
The International World Games Association (IWGA) is the international association responsible for the direction and control of The World Games. Its headquarters are located in Lausanne, Switzerland, and its official language is English.

Its membership consists of 39 international sporting federations. It also works very closely with the Local Organising Committees (LOCs), temporary committees responsible for the organisation of each World Games. LOCs are dissolved after each Games. The IWGA is officially recognised by the International Olympic Committee.

== Ceremonies ==
=== Opening ceremony ===
The opening ceremony marks the official start of The World Games. Until Duisburg 2005, athletes paraded into the ceremony grouped by sport. From 2005, they were grouped by nation, and now march in alphabetical order, with the host country and then the judges last.

The Athletes' Oath is taken by an athlete of the host nation, and the Judges' Oath is taken by the chairman of the Tournament Judges' Commission. Parading of flags, speeches and official opening also make up the required parts of the ceremony. There is also often a musical and artistic aspect of the ceremony. For example, more than 400 artists took part in the opening ceremony of the 2017 World Games in Wroclaw.

=== Athlete party ===
Since 1993 at The Hague, an athlete party has been held in the middle of the competition. It was intended to allow all athletes to participate in at least one ceremony (opening, athlete party, or closing) during the competition.

=== Closing ceremony ===
The closing ceremony ends The World Games and follows the last awards ceremony. Official aspects include speeches, a presentation by the next host city and a handing of the flag of the Games to the representatives of the next host city. In Wroclaw, the second part of the ceremony was a concert performed by local artists.

== Editions ==
Host cities of The World Games

Overview of The World Games Editions
Year	Edition	Host	Opened by	Official Sports	Invitational Sports	Medal Events	Nations	Date	Athletes	Officials	Top nation	Top medalist
1981	1	United States, Santa Clara	Kim Un-yong	15	1 (Note: An invitational sport programme did not exist for the 1981 World Games. Press coverage did not refer to water polo as an invitational sport. An agreement was reached with FINA in the lead-up to the games not to allow women's water polo athletes to march in the opening ceremony, to assuage the displeasure of the International Olympic Committee (IOC) for its being included in the programme.)	104	58	25 July – 2 August 1981	1,400 (est) or 1,546	293	United States	United States
1985	2	United Kingdom, London	Charles Palmer	20	1	134	51	25 July – 4 August 1985	1,410	333	Italy	Italy
1989	3	West Germany, Karlsruhe	Juan Antonio Samaranch	18	2	103	50	20–30 July 1989	1,359	285	Italy	West Germany
1993	4	Netherlands, The Hague	Kevan Gosper	21	4	160	67	21 July – 1 August 1993	2,026	418	Germany	Germany
1997	5	Finland, Lahti	Juan Antonio Samaranch	20	6	164	70	7–17 August 1997	2,016	430	United States	United States
2001	6	Japan, Akita	Toyama Atsuko	22	5	170	80	16–26 August 2001	2,380	591	Russia	Russia
2005	7	Germany, Duisburg	Otto Schily	26	6	178	93	14–24 July 2005	3,149	638	Russia	Russia; Germany
2009	8	Chinese Taipei (Note: The Republic of China (Taiwan) is designated Chinese Taipei by International World Games Association and the majority of international organisations it participates in due to political considerations and Cross-Strait relations with the People's Republic of China.), Kaohsiung	Ma Ying-jeou	25	5	155	84	16–26 July 2009	2,908	636	Russia	Russia
2013	9	Colombia, Cali	Angelino Garzón	26	4 or 5 (Note: A summary article at the TWG website cites "Roller Sports - Road" as an invitational sport. However, at the TWG results history look-up website, medals awarded for "Roller Sports - Speed Skating Road" events are included, unlike four 2013 invitational sports, and the medals are included in the main Medal Tally on the website of the 2013 TWG Full Official Results, not the Invitational Medal Tally. In either case, the number of official sports is not affected since the Roller Sports are already included in the number of official sports because of other disciplines.)	194	91	25 July – 4 August 2013	3,103	682	Italy	Russia
2017	10	Poland, Wrocław	Thomas Bach	27	4	219	102	20–30 July 2017	3,430	856	Russia	Russia
2022	11	United States, Birmingham	Randall Woodfin	30	5 (Note: José Perurena, IWGA President, stated, "In Birmingham, for the first time, invitational sports were no longer presented separately but were also part of the official programme." This is now TWG policy.)	223	99	7–17 July 2022	3,457	868	Germany	Italy
2025	12	China, Chengdu	Shen Yiqin	35	—N/a	256	118	7–17 August 2025	3,693		China	China
2029	13	Germany, Karlsruhe			—N/a			19–29 July 2029				

== Sports ==
=== Official sports ===
For The World Games in 2017 and before, official sports were selected solely by the IWGA. Only sports whose international federations were members of the IWGA could be selected. From 2022, the official sports are selected by both the IWGA and host city and can include some sports whose federations are not part of the IWGA.

As formalised in the memorandum of understanding, "only events that are not on the programme of the Olympic Games can be included in the programme of The World Games". For example, canoe polo is a discipline at The World Games, while canoe sprint and canoe slalom are disciplines at the Olympic Games, despite all three being governed by the International Canoe Federation.

Sports that depend on the availability of snow or ice for competitions are ineligible for inclusion in The World Games.

Sports which have been contested at all editions of The World Games are finswimming, trampoline and tumbling disciplines of gymnastics, karate, powerlifting, roller sports, and tug of war.

=== Invitational sports ===
In addition to the official sports, the host city, in coordination with the IWGA, has been allowed to invite sports to participate in the individual programme. These sports optionally are permitted to include international sports federations that were not members of the IWGA. Before Birmingham 2022, these were deemed "invitational sports".

Starting in Birmingham 2022, there is no distinction between official and invitational sports. Host cities are still able to select up to five optional sports, but they are designated "official" sports, rather than invitational. In addition, the host city will be able to designate "display sports". José Perurena, IWGA President, stated, "In Birmingham, for the first time, invitational sports were no longer presented separately but were also part of the official programme." For example, the Birmingham Organising Committee selected men's lacrosse (women's being selected by the IWGA), duathlon, flag football and wushu. For the first time ever, a paralympic sport was part of the programme as a wheelchair rugby tournament was held.

Some sports or disciplines started in The World Games as invitational sports and then became official, often as their international federations became part of the IWGA. These include the lyonnaise discipline of boules sports, beach handball, sumo, and indoor tug of war.

=== Olympic sports ===
Sports or disciplines which have been part of The World Games and the Olympics include badminton, baseball and softball, karate, rugby, sport climbing, taekwondo, target archery, rhythmic and trampoline gymnastics, triathlon, beach volleyball and water polo. Target archery and trampolining gymnastics are currently on the programme of both, but The World Games only holds events in divisions that are not contested in the Olympics.

=== Other sports presented ===
In addition to official and invitational sports, other sports have been presented during The World Games, including through "The World Games Garden". Among such sports are: Rhönrad (wheel gymnastics), Karlsruhe-based ring tennis, skateboarding, baton twirling (Note: IWGA does not mention Baton twirling among the invitational or other sports.) and others.

=== Table of sports ===
Sport	Current?	Official	Invitational (Note: José Perurena, IWGA President, stated, "In Birmingham, for the first time, invitational sports were no longer presented separately but were also part of the official programme." This is now TWG policy.)	Olympic
Aikido	No		1993–2005 (no medals awarded)	
Air sports	Yes	Skydiving: 1997–2022; Paragliding: 2013; Aerobatics: 2017; Paramotoring: 2017; Drone racing: 2022–		
American football	Yes	Flag football (women): 2025	2005, 2017; Flag football: 2022	Demonstration: 1932; Flag football: 2028
Archery	Yes	Field: 1985–; Target: 2017– (Note: Target archery is part of the Olympic Games programme, but only in what that sport calls the "open recurve" division, allowing stabilizers and sights to be attached to bows. The World Games programme in target archery features compound bow and "barebow" divisions, with the latter restricted to recurve bows without sights or stabilizers.)		
Badminton	No	1981		Demonstration: 1972. Official: 1992–
Baseball – Softball	Softball and Baseball5	Baseball: 1981, Softball (men): 1981, 2025; Softball (women): 1981–85, 2022–; Baseball5: 2029	Softball: 2009–2013	Baseball: 1992–2008, 2020, 2028; Softball: 1996–2008, 2020, 2028
Billiards sports	Yes	Carom billiards, Pool, Snooker: 2001–		
Boomerang	No		1989 (demonstration)	
Boules sports	Yes	Petanque: 1985–, Lyonnaise: 2001– Raffa: 2009–2017	Lyonnaise: 1997	
Bowling	No	Ten pin: 1981–2022, Nine pin: 2005		Demonstration: 1988
Canoe	Yes	Canoe polo: 2005–, Marathon: 2022–, Dragon boat: 2025	Marathon: 2013; Dragon boat: 2005–2009 (Note: Dragon Boat was cited as a separate sport in the summaries of the 2005 and 2009 Games. It is now considered a discipline of canoe.)	
Casting	No	Allround: 1981, (Note: Medals were awarded for "casting allround", but it was not separately contested. It was a combination of athletes’ results in all three disciplines.); Fly: 1981–1985, 1993–2005; Multiplier: 1981–1985, 1993–2001; Spinning: 1981–1985, 1993–1997		
Cheerleading	Yes	Pom: 2025		
Cycling	No	Artistic: 1989, Cycle ball: 1989		
Dancesport	Yes	Latin: 1997–; Standard: 1997–; Rock 'n' roll: 2005–2009, 2017–2022; Salsa: 2013–2017; Breaking: 2022–		Breaking: 2024
Equestrian	No		Vaulting: 1993	Vaulting: 1920
Fistball	Yes	Outdoor: 1985–		
Fitness and Bodybuilding	No	Bodybuilding: 1981–2009		
Floorball	Yes	Indoor: 2017–	Indoor: 1997	
Flying disc	Yes	Ultimate: 2001–, Disc golf: 2001, 2025	Ultimate: 1989 (demonstration)	
Gateball	No		2001	
Gymnastics (Note: Gymnastics disciplines at The World Games are not those contested at the Olympics.)	All except Rhythmic	Trampoline: 1981–, Tumbling: 1981–, Acrobatic: 1993–, Aerobic: 1997–, Rhythmic: 2001–2022, Parkour: 2022–		Trampoline: 2000–
Handball	Beach only	Beach: 2013–	Beach: 2001–2009	
Hockey	No		Field, indoor: 2005	
Jujitsu	Yes	Duo: 1997–, Fighting: 1997–, Ne-waza: 2013–, Duo for athletes with impairment: 2025		
Karate	Yes	Kata: 1981– , Kumite: 1981–		2020
Kickboxing	Yes	K1 style: 2022–, Point Fighting: 2025	K1 style: 2017	
Korfball	Yes	Indoor: 1985–, Beach: 2025		Demonstrations: 1920, 1928
Lacrosse	Yes	Women's: 2017, Women's Sixes: 2022–	Men's Sixes: 2022	Demonstrations (men's): 1928, 1932, 1948; Official: Sixes: 2028
Lifesaving	Pool only	Pool: 1985–; Beach: 2001–2009; Combined team races: 2001–2009		
Military pentathlon	No		1997	
Minigolf	No		1989	
Motorcycling	No		Motocross: 1985, Speedway: 1985, 2017, Indoor trial: 2005	
Muaythai	Yes	2017–		
Netball	No	1985–1993		
Orienteering	Yes	2001–		
Pesäpallo	No		1997	Demonstration: 1952
Powerboating	Yes	MotoSurf (biofuel/electric): 2025		
Powerlifting	Yes	Equipped: 1981–, Classic: 2025		
Racquetball	Yes	1981–85, 1993, 2009–2013, 2022–		
Roller sports	Yes	Artistic: 1981–2022, Roller Hockey: 1981–1993, 2001, Inline Hockey: 2005–; Speed Skating Track: 1981–; Speed Skating Road: 1981, (Note: Road speed skating was held at the 1981 Games, with the men's marathon and women's half-marathon being contested in international competition for the first time. But at the TWG results history look-up website, it is not indicated as a separate discipline for Roller Sports, but rather as part of track speed skating.) 2013– (Note: A summary article at the TWG website cites "Roller Sports - Road" as an invitational sport. However, at the TWG results history look-up website, medals awarded for "Roller Sports - Speed Skating Road" events are included, unlike four 2013 invitational sports, and the medals are included in the main Medal Tally on the website of the 2013 TWG Full Official Results, not the Invitational Medal Tally.); Freestyle Inline Skating: 2025		Roller hockey: Demonstration: 1992
Rowing	No		Indoor: 2017	
Rugby	No	Sevens: 2001–2013		Rugby Union: 1900, 1908, 1920–1924; Sevens: 2016–
Sambo	Yes	1985, 1993, 2025		
Sport climbing	Speed only	Lead: 2005–2022; Speed: 2005–; Boulder: 2017–2022		2020–
Squash	Yes	1997, 2005–		2028
Sumo	No	2005–2022	2001	
Taekwondo	No	1981–1993		Demonstration: 1988. Official: 2000–
Tchoukball	No		2009	
Triathlon	Invitational sport	1993	1989 (demonstration), Duathlon: 2013, 2022–	Triathlon: 2000–
Tug of war	Outdoor only	Outdoor: 1981–, Indoor: 2005–2017	Indoor: 1993–2001	1900–1920
Underwater sports	Yes	Finswimming: 1981– , Freediving: 2025		
Volleyball	No	Beach: 1993		Beach: Demonstration: 1992. Official: 1996–
Water polo	No		Women's: 1981 (Note: An invitational sport programme did not exist for the 1981 World Games. Press coverage did not refer to water polo as an invitational sport. An agreement was reached with FINA in the lead-up to the games not to allow women's water polo athletes to march in the opening ceremony, to assuage the displeasure of the International Olympic Committee for its being included in the programme. Five days before the opening ceremony, Canada had become the newly-crowned World Cup champion in Brisbane, Australia, in a competition that included the same three teams that medaled in these Games.)	Women's: 2000–
Waterski & Wakeboard	All except waterski and barefoot	Waterski: 1981–2022; Barefoot: 1997–2009; Wakeboard: 2001–; Cable wakeboard: 2005, 2025; Wake Surf: 2025	Barefoot: 1993	Demonstration: 1972
Weightlifting	No	Women's: 1997		Women's: 2000–
Wheelchair rugby	Low point only		Low point: 2022	
Wushu	Yes	Taolu: 2025, Sanda: 2025	Sanda: 2009–2013; Taolu: 2009–2013, 2022	

== Medal tables ==
=== All-time nation medal table ===
Last updated after the 2025 World Games

Top ten total medal ranking
Rank	Nation	Gold	Silver	Bronze	Total
1	Germany (Note: In 2017, Germany was stripped of a gold medal in women's bowling for doping. This table reflects the reallocation of medals for that event.)	181	135	170	486
2	Italy (Note: The results from the 2001 World Games are from the archived website of the Akita, Japan, organizing committee.) (Note: Italy was stripped of a gold medal in women's muaythai and a bronze medal in women's powerlifting for doping at the 2022 World Games. This table reflects the reallocation of medals for those events.)	179	198	176	553
3	United States (Note: The 1997 bronze medalists in aerobics mixed pair were from Great Britain, not United States as stated in IWGA source.)	172	157	126	455
4	Russia (Note: The Soviet Union, which amassed 36 total medals in 1989, is counted separately from its successor states, including Russia. This is consistent with the separate counting of medals for other states that sub-divided into their constituent successor states following their initial participation in the World Games. These include Czechoslovakia (Czech Republic and Slovakia) and FR Yugoslavia (2001)/SUSM (2005) (Serbia and Montenegro).)	137	110	72	319
5	France	125	127	136	388
6	China	113	76	39	228
7	Ukraine (Note: In 2009, Ukraine was stripped of two gold medals in bodybuilding for doping, and Qatar and Brazil were each stripped of a silver medal. This table does not include those stripped medals, and neither does it include possible reallocation of those medals, as the results at the World Games website do not reflect a reallocation.)	74	73	68	215
8	Japan	72	62	71	205
9	Great Britain (Note: The 1981 mixed badminton title was won by a pair of players from Sweden and Great Britain. Both nations are counted as having won a gold medal.)	69	67	98	234
10	Spain	58	51	64	173
Totals (10 entries)		1,180	1,056	1,020	3,256

=== All-time athlete medal table ===
Top ten medal table for athletes

Rank	Athlete	Nation	Sport	Years Active	Gold	Silver	Bronze	Total
1	Jurgen Kolenda	Germany	Finswimming	1981–1985	11	0	0	11
2	Steve Rajeff	United States	Casting	1981–2005	8	4	3	15
3	Serguei Akhapov	Russia	Finswimming	1989–2005	8	4	1	13
4	Bart Swings	Belgium	Speed skating	2013–2022	8	2	2	12
5	Danny Wieck	Germany	Life saving	2013–2022	6	1	2	9
6	Magali Rousseau	France	Life saving	2013–2022	6	1	1	8
6	Patrice Martin	France	Waterski	1981–2001	6	1	1	8
8	Anna Poliakova	Russia	Sumo	2009–2017	6	0	0	6
9	Marcello Saporiti	Italy	Life saving	1989–1993	5	2	2	9
10	Vasilisa Kravchuk	Russia	Finswimming	2005–2013	5	2	1	8
