= 1989 World Games =

Multi-sport event in Karlsruhe, West Germany

World Games III
- Host city: Karlsruhe, West Germany
- Nations: 36
- Athletes: 1,265
- Events: 112 (19 sports)
- Opening: 20 July 1989
- Closing: 30 July 1989
- Opened by: President Richard von Weizsäcker
- Main venue: Wildparkstadion

The 1989 World Games (German: 1989 Weltspiele), commonly known as Karlsruhe 1989, were the third edition of the World Games, an international multi-sport event. This edition was held in Karlsruhe, West Germany.

== Titles ==
112 titles were awarded in 19 sports (5 invitational sports not included).

As Invitational sport

Sport	Titles	Notes
Artistic cycling	4	
Bodybuilding	6	
Boules	2	
Bowling	3	
Cycle ball	1	
Field archery	4	
Fistball	1	
Finswimming	14	
Karate	12	
Korfball	1	
Life saving	16	
Netball	1	
Powerlifting	6	
Artistic roller skating	4	
Roller speed skating	10	
Roller hockey	1	
Taekwondo	12	
Trampoline	6	
Tug of war	2	
Waterskiing	6	
Aikido		
Bahn golf		
Boomerang		
Triathlon		
Ultimate (flying disc)		
Total	112	

== Medal table ==
The medal tally was as follows. Italy won the most gold medals in this edition; West Germany led in overall medals. Two bronze medals were awarded in the men's karate kata event and in each karate kumite (10) and taekwondo (12) event. It was the only time that Soviet Union participated in the World Games.

* Host nation (West Germany)

Rank	Nation	Gold	Silver	Bronze	Total
1	Italy (ITA)	21	15	14	50
2	West Germany (FRG)*	18	13	27	58
3	Soviet Union (URS)	15	13	8	36
4	United States (USA)	8	9	9	26
5	France (FRA)	8	6	6	20
6	South Korea (KOR)	8	1	4	13
7	Great Britain (GBR)	6	6	11	23
8	Canada (CAN)	6	2	1	9
9	Chinese Taipei (TPE)	4	0	0	4
10	China (CHN)	2	5	1	8
11	Japan (JPN)	2	4	7	13
12	Austria (AUT)	2	4	4	10
13	Netherlands (NED)	2	2	3	7
14	Belgium (BEL)	2	1	3	6
15	Finland (FIN)	2	1	0	3
16	Portugal (POR)	2	0	0	2
17	Switzerland (SUI)	1	5	4	10
18	Indonesia (INA)	1	0	4	5
19	New Zealand (NZL)	1	0	0	1
19	Norway (NOR)	1	0	0	1
21	Spain (ESP)	0	4	8	12
22	Australia (AUS)	0	3	5	8
23	Czechoslovakia (TCH)	0	3	0	3
24	Jordan (JOR)	0	2	1	3
25	Philippines (PHI)	0	2	0	2
26	Hungary (HUN)	0	1	5	6
27	Turkey (TUR)	0	1	4	5
28	Denmark (DEN)	0	1	1	2
28	Egypt (EGY)	0	1	1	2
28	India (IND)	0	1	1	2
28	Ireland (IRL)	0	1	1	2
28	Sweden (SWE)	0	1	1	2
33	Algeria (ALG)	0	1	0	1
33	Brazil (BRA)	0	1	0	1
33	Mexico (MEX)	0	1	0	1
33	Poland (POL)	0	1	0	1
37	Luxembourg (LUX)	0	0	1	1
Totals (37 entries)		112	112	135	359

== Opening Event ==
The opening event was created and organised by the Traumfabrik theater.
