= List of 2017 World Games medal winners =

The 2017 World Games were held in Wrocław, Poland, from July 20 to July 30, 2017.

== Acrobatic gymnastics ==
Event	Gold	Silver	Bronze
Men's pair	Germany; Tim Sebastian; Michail Kraft	Russia; Igor Mishev; Nikolay Suprunov	Belgium; Kilian Goffaux; Robin Casse
Men's group	Great Britain; Conor Sawenko; Charlie Tate; Adam Upcott; Lewis Watts	China; Li Zheng; Rui Liuming; Zhang Teng; Zhou Jiahuai	Israel; Lidar Dana; Yannay Kalfa; Efi Sach; Daniel Uralevitch
Women's pair	Russia; Daria Guryeva; Daria Kalinina	Belgium; Lore Vanden Berghe; Noémie Lammertyn	Ukraine; Veronika Habelok; Irina Nazimova
Women's group	Russia; Daria Chebulanka; Polina Plastinina; Ksenia Zagoskina	Belarus; Julia Ivonchyk; Veranika Nabokina; Karina Sandovich	Great Britain; Isabel Haigh; Emily Hancock; Ilisha Boardman
Mixed pair	Russia; Georgii Pataraia; Marina Chernova	Belarus; Artur Beliakou; Volha Melnik	Great Britain; Lewis Walker; Kitty Williams

== Aerobic gymnastics ==
Event	Gold	Silver	Bronze
Mixed pair	Spain; Vicente Lli; Sara Moreno	Hungary; Dániel Bali; Dóra Hegyi	Romania; Dacian Barna; Andreea Bogati
Trio	Japan; Riri Kitazume; Takumi Kanai; Mizuki Saito	China; Pan Lixi; Li Lingxiao; Ma Dong	France; Florian Bugalho; Maxime Decker-Breitel; Tom Jourdan
Group	China; Li Qi; Pan Lixi; Li Lingxiao; Ma Dong; Wang Ke	Romania; Andreea Bogati; Dacian Barna; Gabriel Bocșer; Marian Brotei; Lucian Săvulescu	Hungary; Dóra Hegyi; Fanni Mazács; Panna Szőllősi; Dániel Bali; Balázs Farkas
Step	Russia; Anastasia Degtiareva; Irina Dobriagina; Anastasia Gvozdetskaia; Veronika Korneva; Ekaterina Pykhtova; Anastasia Ziubina; Danil Chaiun; Aleksey Germanov	China; Fu Yao; Huang Chengkai; Liu Yiluan; Zhang Huiwen; Yang Qiaobo; Zhao Ming; Huang Zijing; Jiang Shuai	Hungary; Zsófia Etényi; Kitti Kőrösi; Júlia Szabó; Boglárka Szenes; Angéla Szilvás; Anita Táskai; Dorottya Varga; Dániel Erdősi
Dance	South Korea; Han Jae-hyun; Kim Han-jin; Kim Yu-hwan; Kwon Tae-yun; Lee Jon-gu; Park Hyun-min; Ryu Ju-sun; Song Sung-kyu	Russia; Danil Chaiun; Garsevan Dzhanazian; Kirill Kulikov; Kirill Lobaznyuk; Roman Semenov; Anton Shishigin; Denis Shurupov; Aleksey Zhuravlev	Hungary; Klaudia Bökönyi; Anna Deák; Dóra Hegyi; Fanni Mazács; Emese Szalóki; Panna Szőllősi; Balázs Farkas; Zoltán Lőcsei

== Air sports ==
Event	Gold	Silver	Bronze
Glider aerobatics	Ferenc Tóth; Hungary	Luca Bertossio; Italy	Eugen Schaal; Germany
Parachuting canopy piloting	Nick Batsch; United States	Curt Bartholomew; United States	Cornelia Mihai; United Arab Emirates
Paramotoring slalom	Wojciech Bógdał; Poland	Kittiphop Phrommat; Thailand	Marcin Bernat; Poland

== Archery ==
Event	Gold	Silver	Bronze
Men's compound	Stephan Hansen; Denmark	Esmaeil Ebadi; Iran	Domagoj Buden; Croatia
Men's field recurve	Amedeo Tonelli; Italy	Brady Ellison; United States	Wataru Oonuki; Japan
Men's field barebow	István Kakas; Hungary	John Demmer; United States	Martin Ottosson; Sweden
Women's compound	Sara López; Colombia	Toja Ellison; Slovenia	Christie Colin; United States
Women's field recurve	Lisa Unruh; Germany	Naomi Folkard; Great Britain	Jessica Tomasi; Italy
Women's field barebow	Cinzia Noziglia; Italy	Lina Björklund; Sweden	Martina Macková; Czech Republic
Mixed team compound	Denmark; Stephan Hansen; Sarah Sönnichsen	Mexico; Rodolfo González; Linda Ochoa	United States; Kris Schaff; Cassidy Cox

== Artistic roller skating ==
Event	Gold	Silver	Bronze
Men's free skating	Luca Lucaroni; Italy	Pierre Meriel; France	Juan Francisco Sánchez; Argentina
Women's free skating	Silvia Nemesio; Italy	Mónica Gimeno; Spain	Rafaela Freitas; Brazil
Pairs	Italy; Alessandro Spigai; Elena Leoni	Italy; Marco Garelli; Sara Venerucci	France; Nathanaël Fouloy; Marine Portet
Dance	Italy; Luca Lucaroni; Rebecca Tarlazzi	Italy; Andrea Bassi; Silvia Stibilj	Portugal; José Souto; Mariana Souto

== Beach handball ==
Event	Gold	Silver	Bronze
Men	Brazil; Cristiano Rossa; Nailson Amaral; Bruno Oliveira; Thiago Gusmão; Gil Pires; Thiago Barcellos; Marcelo Tuller; Pedro Wirtzbiki; Diogo Vieira; Wellington Esteves	Croatia; David Henigman; Josip Šandrk; Dario Begonja; Ivan Dumenčić; Ivan Jurić; Zvonimir Đikić; Matej Semren; Tomislav Lauš; Lucian Bura; Dominik Marković	Qatar; Ahmed Morgan; Amir Denguir; Hadi Hamdoon; Mohamed Hassan; Mohsin Yafai; Mohab Mahfouz; Mutasem Mohamed; Sid Kenaoui; Hani Kakhi; Anis Zouaoui
Women	Brazil; Nathalie Sena; Camila Souza; Millena Alencar; Patrícia Scheppa; Renata Santiago; Ingrid Frazão; Juliana Oliveira; Cinthya Piquet; Carolina Braz; Jéssica Barros	Argentina; Agustina Mirotta; Ivana Eliges; Florencia Ibarra; Rocío Barros; Florencia Bericio; Celeste Meccia; Daniela Aguzzi; Carolina Rossi; Luciana Scordamaglia; Rayen Cárdenas	Spain; Silvia Lladró; Asunción Batista; Patricia Conejero; Raquel Caño; Sara Hernández; Sonora Solano; Andrea Sánchez; Luisa García; Cristina Conejero; María del Carmen Sánchez

== Boules sports ==
Event	Gold	Silver	Bronze
Men's lyonnaise precision	Nicolás Pretto; Argentina	Pero Ćubela; Croatia	Grégory Chirat; France
Men's lyonnaise progressive	Guillaume Abelfo; France	Anže Petrič; Slovenia	Li Panpan; China
Men's pétanque shooting	Henri Lacroix; France	Thanakorn Sangkaew; Thailand	Diego Rizzi; Italy
Men's pétanque doubles	Italy; Fabio Dutto; Diego Rizzi	Thailand; Thanakorn Sangkaew; Sarawut Sriboonpeng	Spain; Enrique Catalán; Manuel Romero
Men's raffa doubles	Italy; Giuliano Di Nicola; Gianluca Formicone	San Marino; Enrico Dall'Olmo; Jacopo Frisoni	Austria; Günther Baur; Philipp Wolfgang
Women's lyonnaise precision	Guo Xiaomin; China	Suzy Marie; France	Laura Škoberne; Slovenia
Women's lyonnaise progressive	Barbara Barthet; France	Wang Yang; China	Serena Traversa; Italy
Women's pétanque shooting	Caroline Bourriaud; France	Nantawan Fueangsanit; Thailand	Chao Guijin; China
Women's pétanque doubles	Thailand; Nantawan Fueangsanit; Phantipha Wongchuvej	Belgium; Nancy Barzin; Camille Max	France; Caroline Bourriaud; Anne Maillard
Women's raffa doubles	Argentina; Romina Bolatti; María Maíz	Brazil; Noeli Dalla Corte; Ana Caroline Martins	China; Cen Wefei; Zhang Wei

== Bowling ==
Event	Gold	Silver	Bronze
Men's singles	Cho Young-seon; South Korea	Ildemaro Ruíz; Venezuela	Tobias Bording; Germany
Men's doubles	Canada; François Lavoie; Dan MacLelland	Venezuela; Massimiliano Fridegotto; Ildemaro Ruíz	Hong Kong; Michael Mak; Wu Siu Hong
Women's singles	Kelly Kulick; United States	Clara Guerrero; Colombia	Daria Kovalova; Ukraine
Women's doubles	Colombia; Clara Guerrero; Rocio Restrepo	United States; Kelly Kulick; Danielle McEwan	Mexico; Sandra Góngora; Tannya López

== Canoe polo ==
Event	Gold	Silver	Bronze
Men	Germany; Johan Driessen; Jakob Husen; Lennart Unterfeld; Lukas Richter; Robert Pest; Dennis Witt; Jonas Vieren; Fiete Junge	Italy; Andrea Bertelloni; Edoardo Corvaia; Gianluca Distefano; Jan Erik Haack; Andrea Romano; Gianmarco Emanuele; Luca Bellini; Marco Porzio	Spain; Víctor González; Ángel Gordo; Sergio Corbella; Adrián Hermida; Alejandro Gordo; Vicente Claramonte; Alejandro Casal; Alejandro Valls
Women	Germany; Caroline Sinsel; Katharina Kruse; Fabienne Thöle; Svenja Schaeper; Tonie Lenz; Leonie Wagner; Pia Schwarz; Elena Gilles	France; Annie Chevalier; Julie Roux; Rose-Marie Pierre; Claire Moal; Naïs Zanfini; Mélissa Ledormeur; Valérie Sibioude; Aline Roulland	Italy; Ada Prestipino; Maria Anna Szczepanska; Martina Anastasi; Roberta Catania; Chiara Trevisan; Silvia Cogoni; Maddalena Lago; Flavia Landolina

== Cue sports ==
Event	Gold	Silver	Bronze
Men's three-cushion carom	Dani Sánchez; Spain	Marco Zanetti; Italy	Sameh Sidhom; Egypt
Men's nine-ball pool	Carlo Biado; Philippines	Jayson Shaw; Great Britain	Naoyuki Ōi; Japan
Women's nine-ball pool	Chen Siming; China	Kim Ga-young; South Korea	Han Yu; China
Open snooker	Kyren Wilson; Great Britain	Ali Carter; Great Britain	Soheil Vahedi; Iran

== Dancesport ==
Event	Gold	Silver	Bronze
Standard	Germany; Benedetto Ferruggia; Claudia Köhler	Russia; Dmitry Zharkov; Olga Kulikova	Lithuania; Evaldas Sodeika; Ieva Žukauskaitė
Latin	Moldova; Gabriele Goffredo; Anna Matus	Russia; Armen Tsaturyan; Svetlana Gudyno	France; Charles-Guillaume Schmitt; Elena Salikhova
Rock 'n' Roll	Poland; Jacek Tarczyło; Anna Miadzielec	Russia; Konstantin Chistikov; Ksenia Osnovina	Germany; Tobias Bludau; Michelle Uhl
Salsa	Colombia; Stevens Rebolledo; Yinessa Ortega	Colombia; Yefersson Benjumea; Adriana Ávila	Italy; Simone Sanfilippo; Serena Maso

== Finswimming ==
Event	Gold	Silver	Bronze
Men's 100 m surface	Dmitry Zhurman; Russia	Max Poschart; Germany	Pavel Kabanov; Russia
Men's 200 m surface	Dmitry Zhurman; Russia	Max Poschart; Germany	Dmitry Kokorev; Russia
Men's 400 m surface	Dénes Kanyó; Hungary	Max Lauschus; Germany	Davide De Ceglie; Italy
Men's 50 m bi-fins	Andrey Arbuzov; Russia	Jakub Jarolím; Czech Republic	Dmitry Gavrilov; Belarus
Men's 100 m bi-fins	Dmitry Gavrilov; Belarus	Gergő Kosina; Hungary	Jakub Jarolím; Czech Republic
Men's 50 m apnoea	Pavel Kabanov; Russia	Mauricio Fernández; Colombia	Lee Dong-jin; South Korea
Men's 4 × 100 m surface relay	Russia; Pavel Kabanov; Aleksey Kazantsev; Dmitry Kokorev; Dmitry Zhurman	Italy; Kevin Zanardi; Andrea Nava; Stefano Figini; Cesare Fumarola	Germany; Max Lauschus; Max Poschart; Florian Kritzler; Malte Striegler
Women's 100 m surface	Ekaterina Mikhaylushkina; Russia	Shu Chengjing; China	Anna Ber; Russia
Women's 200 m surface	Valeriya Baranovskaya; Russia	Ekaterina Mikhaylushkina; Russia	Anastasiia Antoniak; Ukraine
Women's 400 m surface	Sun Yiting; China	Kim Bo-kyung; South Korea	Anastasiia Antoniak; Ukraine
Women's 50 m bi-fins	Petra Senánszky; Hungary	Choi Min-ji; South Korea	Krisztina Varga; Hungary
Women's 100 m bi-fins	Petra Senánszky; Hungary	Krisztina Varga; Hungary	Iryna Pikiner; Ukraine
Women's 50 m apnoea	Jang Ye-sol; South Korea	Kim Ga-in; South Korea	Kateryna Dyelova; Ukraine
Women's 4 × 100 m surface relay	Russia; Valeriya Baranovskaya; Anna Ber; Aleksandra Skurlatova; Ekaterina Mikhaylushkina	Colombia; Grace Fernández; Viviana Retamozo; Kelly Pérez; Paula Aguirre	South Korea; Jang Ye-sol; Kim Eun-kyoung; Kim Ga-in; Kim Bo-kyung

== Fistball ==
Event	Gold	Silver	Bronze
Men	Germany; Patrick Thomas; Fabian Sagstetter; Ajith Fernando; Lukas Schubert; Steve Schmutzler; Nick Trinemeier; Sebastian Thomas; Andrew Fernando; Oliver Späth; Tim Albrecht	Switzerland; Lukas Lässer; Raphael Schlattinger; Kevin Kohler; Ueli Rebsamen; Marco Eymann; Nicolas Fehr; Mario Kohler; Malik Müller; Kenneth Schoch; Luca Flückiger	Austria; Jean Andrioli; Gustav Gürtler; Julian Payrleitner; Béla Gschwandtner; Elias Walchshofer; Manuel Helmberger; Klaus Thaller; Martin Pühringer; Stefan Wohlfahrt; Simon Lugmair

== Floorball ==
Event	Gold	Silver	Bronze
Men	Sweden; Johan Samuelsson; Johannes Larsson; Kim Nilsson; Alexander Galante Carlström; Mattias Samuelsson; Tobias Gustafsson; Kasper Hedlund; Rasmus Enström; Emil Johansson; Rasmus Sundstedt; Jonas Svahn; Robin Nilsberth; Måns Parsjö Tegnér; Viktor Klintsten	Switzerland; Nicola Bischofberger; Claudio Laely; Manuel Maurer; Matthias Hofbauer; Paolo Riedi; Manuel Engel; Christoph Meier; Patrick Eder; Kevin Berry; Patrick Mendelin; Curdin Furrer; Dan Hartmann; Luca Graf; Tim Braillard	Finland; Santtu Strandberg; Juha Kivilehto; Eemeli Salin; Jussi Piha; Janne Lamminen; Nico Salo; Tatu Väänänen; Mika Kohonen; Lauri Stenfors; Krister Savonen; Peter Kotilainen; Pyry Luukkonen; Sami Johansson; Miko Kailiala

== Flying disc ==
Event	Gold	Silver	Bronze
Mixed ultimate	United States; Grant Lindsley; George Stubbs; Dylan Freechild; Sarah Griffith; Lien Hoffmann; Carolyn Finney; Georgia Bosscher; Jimmy Mickle; Nick Stuart; Chris Kocher; Anna Nazarov; Sandy Jorgensen; Beau Kittredge; Claire Desmond	Colombia; Alejandra Torres; Laura Ospina; Manuela Cárdenas; Iván Alba; Julio Duque; Alexander Ford; Elizabeth Mosquera; Yina Cartagena; Valeria Cárdenas; Andrés Ramírez; Santiago Montaño; Mauricio Martínez; Esteban Ceballos; María Angélica Forero	Canada; Terri Whitehead; Andrew Carroll; Morgan Hibbert; Jessica Rockliff; Geoff Powell; Tim Tsang; Audrey St-Arnaud; Kevin Underhill; Jessie Grignon Tomás; Laura Mason; Rachel Moens; Mark Lloyd; Catherine Hui; Brendan Wong

== Inline hockey ==
Event	Gold	Silver	Bronze
Men	Czech Republic; Jakub Cik; Mikuláš Zbořil; Pavel Strýček; Jakub Bernard; Adam Přibyl; Lukáš Langer; Michal Šimo; Daniel Brabec; Patrik Šebek; Martin Fiala; Robin Malý; Tomáš Rubeš; Marek Loskot; David Roupec	France; Baptiste Bouchut; Karl Gabillet; Benjamin Tijou; Renaud Crignier; Romain Horrut; Johan Mogniat-Duclos; Jérémy Lapresa; Clément Belot; Roman de Préval; Jérôme Salley; Maxime Langlois; Jean-François Ladonne; Antoine Rage; Lambert Hamon	Switzerland; Ken Häfliger; Fabian Maier; Pascal Wittwer; Stefan Hürlimann; Jean Savary; Corentin Collaud; Daniel Steiner; Alain Bahar; Lukas Dietrich; Stefan Tschannen; Dario Kummer; Michael Loosli; Quentin Zürche; Andreas Zehnder

== Ju-jitsu ==
Event	Gold	Silver	Bronze
Men's duo	Austria; Nikolaus Bichler; Sebastian Vosta	Netherlands; Ruben Assmann; Marnix Bunnik	Belgium; Ben Cloostermans; Bjarne Lardon
Men's fighting 62 kg	Bohdan Mochulskyi; Ukraine	Alejandro Viviescas; Colombia	Roman Apolonov; Germany
Men's fighting 69 kg	Boy Vogelzang; Netherlands	Pavel Korzhavykh; Russia	Eduardo Gutiérrez; Mexico
Men's fighting 77 kg	Ilya Borok; Russia	Andreas Knebl; Germany	Fredrik Widgren; Sweden
Men's fighting 85 kg	Mikkel Willard; Denmark	Denis Belov; Russia	William Seth-Wenzel; Sweden
Men's fighting 94 kg	Tomasz Szewczak; Poland	Mohsen Hamidi; Iran	Benjamin Lah; Slovenia
Men's fighting +94 kg	Alexandre Fromangé; France	Rafał Riss; Poland	Dejan Vukčević; Montenegro
Men's ne-waza 62 kg	Jędrzej Loska; Poland	Jairo Viviescas; Colombia	Joao Carlos Kuraoka; Japan
Men's ne-waza 69 kg	Haïdar Abbas; France	Maciej Polok; Poland	Evyatar Paperni; Israel
Men's ne-waza 77 kg	Ilke Bulut; Switzerland	Wim Deputter; Belgium	Maciej Kozak; Poland
Men's ne-waza 85 kg	Dan Schon; Mexico	Daniel de Maddalena; Switzerland	Abdulbari Guseinov; Russia
Men's ne-waza 94 kg	Faisal Al-Ketbi; United Arab Emirates	Kristó Szűcs; Hungary	Florent Minguet; Belgium
Men's ne-waza +94 kg	Seif-Eddine Houmine; Morocco	Frédéric Husson; France	Aleksandr Sak; Russia
Men's ne-waza openweight	Kristó Szűcs; Hungary	Faisal Al-Ketbi; United Arab Emirates	Seif-Eddine Houmine; Morocco
Women's duo	Austria; Mirnesa Bećirović; Mirneta Bećirović	Slovenia; Sara Besal; Patricija Delač	Germany; Blanca Birn; Annalena Sturm
Women's fighting 55 kg	Rebekka Dahl; Denmark	Laure Beauchet; France	Jessica Scricciolo; Italy
Women's fighting 62 kg	Séverine Nébié; France	Annalisa Cavarretta; Italy	Carina Neupert; Germany
Women's fighting 70 kg	Theresa Attenberger; Germany	Chloé Lalande; France	Aafke van Leeuwen; Netherlands
Women's ne-waza 55 kg	Amal Amjahid; Belgium	Mönkhgereliin Bayarmaa; Mongolia	Ana Nair Dias; Portugal
Women's ne-waza openweight	Amal Amjahid; Belgium	Luma Qubbaj; Jordan	Emilia Maćkowiak; Poland
Mixed duo	Italy; Michele Vallieri; Sara Paganini	Germany; Johannes Tourbeslis; Julia Paszkiewicz	Belgium; Ian Lodens; Charis Gravensteyn
Mixed team	Germany; Roman Apolonov; Theresa Attenberger; Andreas Knebl; Malte Meinken; Carina Neupert; Julia Paszkiewicz; Johannes Tourbeslis; Tim Weidenbecher	Russia; Denis Belov; Ilya Borok; Abdulbari Guseinov; Pavel Korzhavykh; Olga Medvedeva; Zainutdin Zainukov	Poland; Magdalena Giec; Maciej Kozak; Jędrzej Loska; Emilia Maćkowiak; Tomasz Szewczak; Marta Walotek

== Karate ==
Event	Gold	Silver	Bronze
Men's kata	Ryo Kiyuna; Japan	Damián Quintero; Spain	Antonio Díaz; Venezuela
Men's kumite 60 kg	Firdovsi Farzaliyev; Azerbaijan	Amir Mehdizadeh; Iran	Matías Gómez; Spain
Men's kumite 67 kg	Steven Da Costa; France	Jordan Thomas; Great Britain	Deivis Ferreras; Dominican Republic
Men's kumite 75 kg	Stanislav Horuna; Ukraine	Ali Asghar Asiabari; Iran	Hernâni Veríssimo; Brazil
Men's kumite 84 kg	Zabihollah Pourshab; Iran	Ryutaro Araga; Japan	Uğur Aktaş; Turkey
Men's kumite +84 kg	Hideyoshi Kagawa; Japan	Sajjad Ganjzadeh; Iran	Michał Bąbos; Poland
Women's kata	Kiyou Shimizu; Japan	Sandra Sánchez; Spain	Sandy Scordo; France
Women's kumite 50 kg	Alexandra Recchia; France	Miho Miyahara; Japan	Serap Özçelik; Turkey
Women's kumite 55 kg	Valéria Kumizaki; Brazil	Wen Tzu-yun; Chinese Taipei	Sara Cardin; Italy
Women's kumite 61 kg	Alexandra Grande; Peru	Anita Serogina; Ukraine	Ingrida Suchánková; Slovakia
Women's kumite 68 kg	Lamya Matoub; Algeria	Alisa Buchinger; Austria	Kayo Someya; Japan
Women's kumite +68 kg	Ayumi Uekusa; Japan	Hamideh Abbasali; Iran	Anne-Laure Florentin; France

== Korfball ==
Event	Gold	Silver	Bronze
Mixed	Netherlands; Nadhie den Dunnen; Esther Cordus; Marjolijn Kroon; Maaike Steenbergen; Jet Hendriks; Celeste Split; Suzanne Struik; Olav van Wijngaarden; Erwin Zwart; Harjan Visscher; Mick Snel; Richard Kunst; Laurens Leeuwenhoek; Nick Pikaar	Chinese Taipei; Lin Ya-wen; Chang Shu-chi; Li Chou-ying; Chu Shu-ping; Chen Cin; Lin Szu-yu; Chuan Ying-yen; Wu Chun-hsien; Huang Nien-hua; Wu Shu-an; Chen Chun-ta; Kao Chen-yu; Huang Tzu-yao; Chuang Hsiang-lin	Belgium; Karen Van Camp; Shiara Driesen; Stephanie Versele; Julie Caluwé; Zahra Verhoeven; Saar Seys; Patty Peeters; Jesse De Bremaeker; Nick Janssens; Brent Struyf; David Peeters; Yani Janssens; Jarni Amorgaste; Jari Hardies

== Lacrosse ==
Event	Gold	Silver	Bronze
Women	United States; Devon Wills; Kelly Rabil; Katie Schwarzmann; Kristen Carr; Jennifer Russell; Alyssa Murray; Brooke Griffin; Taylor Cummings; Marie McCool; Megan Douty; Gussie Johns; Ally Carey; Becca Block; Michelle Tumolo; Alice Mercer	Canada; Allison Daley; Quintin Hoch-Bullen; Kaylin Morissette; Tessa Chad; Katie Guy; Holly Lloyd; Erica Evans; Megan Kinna; Lydia Sutton; Claire Mills; Emily Boissonneault; Taylor Gait; Avery Hogarth; Dana Dobbie; Tory Merrill	Australia; Abbie Burgess; Courtney Hobbs; Rebecca Lane; Stella Justice-Allen; Megan Barnett; Bonnie Wells; Sachiyo Yamada; Sarah Mollison; Sarah Lowe; Theadora Kwas; Ashtyn Hiron; Rebecca Banyard; Verity Clough; Beth Varga; Elizabeth Hinkes

== Lifesaving ==
Event	Gold	Silver	Bronze
Men's 200 m obstacle	Bradley Woodward; Australia	Federico Gilardi; Italy	Steven Kent; New Zealand
Men's 50 m manikin carry	Danny Wieck; Germany	Joshua Perling; Germany	Bradley Woodward; Australia
Men's 100 m manikin carry fins	Jacopo Musso; Italy	Andrea Vittorio Piroddi; Italy	Kevin Lehr; Germany
Men's 100 m manikin tow fins	Jacopo Musso; Italy	Kevin Lehr; Germany	Samuel Bell; Australia
Men's 200 m super lifesaver	Daniele Sanna; Italy	Federico Gilardi; Italy	Tom Montgomery; Australia
Men's 4 × 50 m obstacle relay	Japan; Naoya Hirano; Keisuke Hatano; Shun Nishiyama; Suguru Ando	Poland; Cezary Kępa; Wojciech Kotowski; Bartosz Makowski; Adam Dubiel	France; Jérémy Badré; Florian Laclaustra; Gaëtan Quirin; Thomas Vilaceca
Men's 4 × 25 m manikin carry relay	Germany; Christian Ertel; Kevin Lehr; Joshua Perling; Danny Wieck	Poland; Adam Dubiel; Cezary Kępa; Wojciech Kotowski; Bartosz Stanielewicz	Spain; Eduardo Blasco; Sergio Calderón; José Víctor García; Carlos Periañez
Men's 4 × 50 m medley relay	Italy; Federico Gilardi; Jacopo Musso; Andrea Vittorio Piroddi; Daniele Sanna; Sasha Andrea Bartolo	Australia; Samuel Bell; Matthew Davis; Jake Smith; Bradley Woodward	Germany; Christian Ertel; Kevin Lehr; Jan Malkowski; Danny Wieck
Women's 200 m obstacle	Silvia Meschiari; Italy	Alicja Tchórz; Poland	Margaux Fabre; France
Women's 50 m manikin carry	Wu Huimin; China	Mariah Jones; Australia	Cristina Leanza; Italy
Women's 100 m manikin carry fins	Pamela Hendry; Australia	Justine Weyders; France	Federica Volpini; Italy
Women's 100 m manikin tow fins	Justine Weyders; France	Federica Volpini; Italy	Pamela Hendry; Australia
Women's 200 m super lifesaver	Silvia Meschiari; Italy	Prue Davies; Australia	Mariah Jones; Australia
Women's 4 × 50 m obstacle relay	France; Léna Bousquin; Margaux Fabre; Justine Weyders; Magali Rousseau; Delphine Dulat	Australia; Rachel Wood; Mariah Jones; Prue Davies; Pamela Hendry	China; Bao Xueyi; Wu Huimin; Hu Yifan; Dai Xiaodie
Women's 4 × 25 m manikin carry relay	Belgium; Sofie Boogaerts; Aurélie Romanini; Nele Vanbuel; Bieke Vandenabeele; Stefanie Lindekens	China; Bao Xueyi; Dai Xiaodie; Hu Yifan; Wu Huimin	Germany; Sophia Bauer; Annalena Geyer; Kerstin Lange; Jessica Luster
Women's 4 × 50 m medley relay	Germany; Sophia Bauer; Alena Kröhler; Kerstin Lange; Jessica Luster	Australia; Prue Davies; Chelsea Gillet; Pamela Hendry; Mariah Jones; Rachel Wood	Poland; Karolina Faszczewska; Dominika Kossakowska; Anna Nocoń; Alicja Tchórz

== Muaythai ==
Event	Gold	Silver	Bronze
Men's 54 kg	Yelaman Sayassatov; Kazakhstan	Kevin Martínez; Spain	Aslanbek Zikreev; Russia
Men's 57 kg	Wiwat Khamtha; Thailand	Aleksandr Abramov; Russia	Almaz Sarsembekov; Kazakhstan
Men's 63.5 kg	Igor Liubchenko; Ukraine	Ali Zarinfar; Iran	Oskar Siegert; Poland
Men's 67 kg	Sergey Kulyaba; Ukraine	Vladimir Kuzmin; Russia	Anueng Khatthamarasri; Thailand
Men's 71 kg	Suppachai Muensang; Thailand	Masoud Minaei; Iran	Gabriel Mazzetti; Peru
Men's 75 kg	Vitaly Gurkov; Belarus	Vasyl Sorokin; Ukraine	Ivan Grigorev; Russia
Men's 81 kg	Ali Doğan; Turkey	Constantino Nanga; Sweden	Mikita Shostak; Belarus
Men's 91 kg	Oleh Pryimachov; Ukraine	Łukasz Radosz; Poland	Jakub Klauda; Czech Republic
Women's 51 kg	Bùi Yến Ly; Vietnam	Apasara Koson; Thailand	Janet Todd; United States
Women's 54 kg	Sofia Olofsson; Sweden	Valeriya Drozdova; Russia	Meltem Baş; Turkey
Women's 60 kg	Svetlana Vinnikova; Russia	Gia Winberg; Finland	Nili Block; Israel

== Orienteering ==
Event	Gold	Silver	Bronze
Men's sprint	Jerker Lysell; Sweden	Yannick Michiels; Belgium	Matthias Kyburz; Switzerland
Men's middle distance	Matthias Kyburz; Switzerland	Florian Howald; Switzerland	Vojtěch Král; Czech Republic
Women's sprint	Maja Alm; Denmark	Elena Roos; Switzerland	Lina Strand; Sweden
Women's middle distance	Helena Jansson; Sweden	Natalia Gemperle; Russia	Sabine Hauswirth; Switzerland
Mixed relay	Denmark; Cecilie Klysner; Andreas Boesen; Søren Bobach; Maja Alm	Switzerland; Elena Roos; Florian Howald; Matthias Kyburz; Sabine Hauswirth	Russia; Natalia Gemperle; Dmitry Tsvetkov; Andrey Khramov; Galina Vinogradova

== Powerlifting ==
Event	Gold	Silver	Bronze
Men's lightweight	Sergey Fedosienko; Russia	Hassan El-Belghitti; France	Charles Okpoko; United States
Men's middleweight	Jarosław Olech; Poland	Volodymyr Rysiyev; Ukraine	Andriy Naniev; Ukraine
Men's heavyweight	Sergii Bilyi; Ukraine	Dmitry Inzarkin; Russia	Dmytro Semenenko; Ukraine
Men's super heavyweight	Oleksiy Rokochiy; Ukraine	Joe Cappellino; United States	Nurlan Yeshmakhanov; Kazakhstan
Women's lightweight	Natalia Salnikova; Russia	Yukako Fukushima; Japan	Chen Wei-ling; Chinese Taipei
Women's middleweight	Larysa Soloviova; Ukraine	Anna Ryzhkova; Russia	Wu Hui-chun; Chinese Taipei
Women's heavyweight	Ana Castellain; Brazil	Priscilla Ribic; United States	Yenifer Canelón; Venezuela
Women's super heavyweight	Bonica Lough; United States	Tetyana Melnyk; Ukraine	Liane Blyn; United States

== Rhythmic gymnastics ==
Event	Gold	Silver	Bronze
Women's hoop	Arina Averina; Russia	Dina Averina; Russia	Linoy Ashram; Israel
Women's ball	Arina Averina; Russia	Dina Averina; Russia	Katsiaryna Halkina; Belarus
Women's clubs	Dina Averina; Russia	Linoy Ashram; Israel	Arina Averina; Russia
Women's ribbon	Arina Averina; Russia	Dina Averina; Russia	Katsiaryna Halkina; Belarus

== Road speed skating ==
Event	Gold	Silver	Bronze
Men's 200 m time trial	Ioseba Fernández; Spain	Simon Albrecht; Germany	Gwendal Le Pivert; France
Men's 500 m sprint	Gwendal Le Pivert; France	Edwin Estrada; Colombia	Jhoan Guzmán; Venezuela
Men's 10000 m points	Bart Swings; Belgium	Daniel Niero; Italy	Francisco Peula; Spain
Men's 20000 m elimination	Bart Swings; Belgium	Daniel Niero; Italy	Francisco Peula; Spain
Women's 200 m time trial	María José Moya; Chile	Chen Ying-chu; Chinese Taipei	An Yi-seul; South Korea
Women's 500 m sprint	Mareike Thum; Germany	Chen Ying-chu; Chinese Taipei	Rocío Berbel; Argentina
Women's 10000 m points	Fabriana Arias; Colombia	Sandrine Tas; Belgium	Johana Viveros; Colombia
Women's 20000 m elimination	Johana Viveros; Colombia	Sandrine Tas; Belgium	Mareike Thum; Germany

== Sport climbing ==
Event	Gold	Silver	Bronze
Men's bouldering	Yoshiyuki Ogata; Japan	Jan Hojer; Germany	Alexey Rubtsov; Russia
Men's lead	Keiichiro Korenaga; Japan	Yuki Hada; Japan	Sean McColl; Canada
Men's speed	Reza Alipour; Iran	Danyil Boldyrev; Ukraine	Stanislav Kokorin; Russia
Women's bouldering	Staša Gejo; Serbia	Miho Nonaka; Japan	Fanny Gibert; France
Women's lead	Anak Verhoeven; Belgium	Janja Garnbret; Slovenia	Julia Chanourdie; France
Women's speed	Iuliia Kaplina; Russia	Anouck Jaubert; France	Anna Tsyganova; Russia

== Squash ==
Event	Gold	Silver	Bronze
Men's singles	Simon Rösner; Germany	Grégoire Marche; France	Mathieu Castagnet; France
Women's singles	Camille Serme; France	Joey Chan; Hong Kong	Nicol David; Malaysia

== Sumo ==
Event	Gold	Silver	Bronze
Men's 85 kg	Batyr Altyev; Russia	Trent Sabo; United States	Paweł Wojda; Poland
Men's 115 kg	Atsamaz Kaziev; Russia	Misbah Hossam; Egypt	Ochirkhüügiin Ösökhbayar; Mongolia
Men's +115 kg	Vasily Margiev; Russia	Ramy Belal; Egypt	Soichiro Kurokawa; Japan
Men's openweight	Vasily Margiev; Russia	Batyr Altyev; Russia	Hayato Miwa; Japan
Women's 65 kg	Svitlana Trosiuk; Ukraine	Luciana Watanabe; Brazil	Magdalena Macios; Poland
Women's 80 kg	Otgony Mönkhtsetseg; Mongolia	Asano Ota; Japan	Maryna Maksymenko; Ukraine
Women's +80 kg	Anna Poliakova; Russia	Olga Davydko; Russia	Viparat Vituteerasan; Thailand
Women's openweight	Anna Poliakova; Russia	Ivanna Berezovska; Ukraine	Olga Davydko; Russia

== Track speed skating ==
Event	Gold	Silver	Bronze
Men's 300 m time trial	Simon Albrecht; Germany	Andrés Jiménez; Colombia	Gwendal Le Pivert; France
Men's 500 m sprint	Simon Albrecht; Germany	Jhoan Guzmán; Venezuela	Lucas Silva; Chile
Men's 1000 m sprint	Andrés Jiménez; Colombia	Bart Swings; Belgium	Elton de Souza; France
Men's 10000 m points elimination	Ken Kuwada; Argentina	Livio Wenger; Switzerland	Mike Páez; Mexico
Men's 15000 m elimination	Elton de Souza; France	Felix Rijhnen; Germany	Peter Michael; New Zealand
Women's 300 m time trial	Geiny Pájaro; Colombia	An Yi-seul; South Korea	Sandrine Tas; Belgium
Women's 500 m sprint	Giulia Bonechi; Italy	Fabriana Arias; Colombia	Giulia Bongiorno; Italy
Women's 1000 m sprint	Sandrine Tas; Belgium	Fabriana Arias; Colombia	Alejandra Traslaviña; Chile
Women's 10000 m points elimination	Fabriana Arias; Colombia	Sandrine Tas; Belgium	Yang Ho-chen; Chinese Taipei
Women's 15000 m elimination	Fabriana Arias; Colombia	Sandrine Tas; Belgium	Mareike Thum; Germany

== Trampoline gymnastics ==
Event	Gold	Silver	Bronze
Men's synchro	China; Tu Xiao; Dong Dong	Ukraine; Mykola Prostorov; Dmytro Byedyevkin	Japan; Takato Nakazono; Yamato Ishikawa
Men's double mini	Mikhail Zalomin; Russia	Alex Renkert; United States	Diogo Costa; Portugal
Men's tumbling	Zhang Luo; China	Austin Nacey; United States	Maxim Shlyakin; Russia
Women's synchro	Ukraine; Nataliia Moskvina; Svitlana Malkova	Azerbaijan; Sviatlana Makshtarova; Veronika Zemlianaia	Netherlands; Tara Fokké; Carlijn Blekkink
Women's double mini	Paige Howard; United States	Tamara O'Brien; Canada	Lina Sjöberg; Sweden
Women's tumbling	Jia Fangfang; China	Anna Korobeinikova; Russia	Lucie Colebeck; Great Britain

== Tug of war ==
Event	Gold	Silver	Bronze
Men's outdoor 640 kg	Great Britain; David Callcutt; Ian Daniels; Wayne Evans; David Field; David Hammersley; Edward Holland; James Murphy; Edward Shannon; Adrian Webb	Switzerland; Vinzenz Arnold; Peter Erni; Erich Joller; Stefan Krause; Christoph Rölli; Fabian Rölli; Philipp Rölli; Lukas Vogel	Germany; Philipp Berl; Markus Böhler; Lucas Broghammer; Daniel Fien; Patrick Frank; Stefan Heimann; Martin Higel; Manfred Klingele
Men's outdoor 700 kg	Switzerland; Vinzenz Arnold; Peter Erni; Erich Joller; Peter Joller; Stefan Krause; Christoph Rölli; Fabian Rölli; Philipp Rölli	Netherlands; Johannes Bartels; Gerrit Bijenhof; Robin Boerstoel; Gerolph Hoff; Jeroen Nieuwenhuis; Gerbert Schutte; Gerrit Uilenreef; Vincent Wagenmans	Great Britain; David Bowyer; James Dewsberry; Leonard Jarram; William Lee; James Murphy; Ian Robinson; Lee Robinson; Justin Sheppard
Women's indoor 540 kg	Chinese Taipei; Chen Tzu-jung; Cheng Huai-yun; Huang Ting-yi; Kao Chia-yi; Kao Chiao-yi; Li Ju-chun; Li Ting-hsuan; Li Yun-chi; Tien Chia-jung	China; Guo Xue; Hu Yanli; Liu Yingying; Qin Jiao; Song Dan; Tian Tian; Xu Na; Yan Chen; Zhang Jiaqi	South Africa; Jancke de Wet; Ané Ras; René Ras; Claudia Rix; Leonell Steyn; Nadine Stoop; Kittie Terblanche; Samantha Wilmot

== Water skiing ==
Event	Gold	Silver	Bronze
Men's jump	Bojan Schipner; Germany	Rodrigo Miranda; Chile	Aliaksandr Isayeu; Belarus
Men's slalom	Adam Sedlmajer; Czech Republic	Steve Neveu; Canada	Thomas Degasperi; Italy
Men's tricks	Josh Briant; Australia	Pierre Ballon; France	Olivier Fortamps; Belgium
Men's wakeboarding	Shota Tezuka; Japan	Yun Sang-hyun; South Korea	Guy Firer; Israel
Women's jump	Natallia Berdnikava; Belarus	Marie Vympranietsova; Greece	Jutta Menestrina; Finland
Women's slalom	Geena Krüger; Germany	Clémentine Lucine; France	Kate Adriaensen; Belgium
Women's tricks	Natallia Berdnikava; Belarus	Clémentine Lucine; France	Giannina Bonnemann; Germany
Women's wakeboarding	Nicola Butler; United States	Erika Lang; United States	Alice Virag; Italy

== Invitational sports ==
=== American football ===
Event	Gold	Silver	Bronze
Men	France; Pierre Courageux; Aymeric Dethelot; Edris Jean-Alphons; Jérémy Duponchelle; Alexandre Le Gallo; Paul Durand; Andrew James; Victor Ferrier; Stéphane Fortes; Anthony Alix; Charles Delaroque; Yann Dika-Balotoken; Vincent Begou; Stephen Yepmo; Sébastien Sejean; Murphy Balame-Putu; Nicolas Khandar; Armel Ahidazan; Souleymane Karamoko; Sandy Marcin; Brice Rontet; Maxime Roger; Robin Sebeille; Claudio Jacquin; Matthieu Fayard; Kévin Mwamba; Giovanni Nanguy; Etienne Roudel; Averdie Mizius; Romain Faucon; Raphaël Kidari; Nyohor Badiane; Doums Doumbouya; Jean-Amour Fazer; Jean-Philippe Eldin; Bastien Pereira; Willy N'Kishi; Arnaud Montgenie; Olivier Bordin; Nelson Tsimi; Jeff Alexandre; Pierrick Autret; Valentin Gnahoua; Mehdi Bekheira; Robin Mouton	Germany; Thiadric Hansen; Richard Grooten; Benjamin Mau; Aurieus Adegbesan; Sebastian Silva Gomez; Till Janssen; Paul Zimmermann; Tissi Robinson; Sonny Weishaupt; Alexander Haupert; Jason Owuso; Yannick Baumgärtner; Jan Abrahamsen; Christian Köppe; Jazan Yassar; Joshua Poznanski; Marc Scherenberg; Tobias Nick; Patrick Poetsch; Donnie Avant; Levi Kruse; Kerim Homri; David Müller; Leon Helm; Simon Brenner; Moritz Meis; Hermann Schramm; Robin Fensch; Jan Lanser; Philipp Tolksdorf; Yannick Kiehl; Thomas Schmidt; Aaron Wahl; Harald Binczek; Lane Acheampong; Kwame Ofori; Mike Schallo; Nicolai Schumann; Hendrick Hinrichs; Maximilian Wild; Thomas Rauch; Marc Anthony Hor; Paul Seemann; Sven Rieger; Simon Gavanda; Peter Arentsen	United States; Deante Battle; Oscar Vazquez-Dyer; Cam Countryman; Dustin Hawke Willingham; Meech Eaton; Terry Gaitor; Davarus Shores; Lamar Hall; Tyrell Blanks; Mike Van Deripe; Mario Brown; Austin Jones; Cody Smith; Taylor Palmer; T. J. Richardson; Preston Rabb; Anthony Benson; Brett Perkins; Triston McCathern; Joe Bergeron; Gary Stevenson; Billy Carlile; John Moorhead; Ryan Seaberg; Nick Reyna; Zachary Blair; Patrick Fitzgerald; John van Vliet; Jabrai Regan; Randall Jackson-Clemons; Dante Cattaneo; Eric Janeau; Zakkary Packard; Giuliano Cattaneo; Nick Sweet; Archie Zaniewski

=== Indoor rowing ===
Event	Gold	Silver	Bronze
Men's 500 m	Anton Bondarenko; Ukraine	Phil Clapp; Great Britain	Pavel Shurmei; Belarus
Men's 2000 m	Oliver Zeidler; Germany	Anton Bondarenko; Ukraine	Bendegúz Pétervári-Molnár; Hungary
Men's lightweight 2000 m	Artur Mikołajczewski; Poland	Florian Berg; Austria	Jaruwat Saensuk; Thailand
Women's 500 m	Olena Buryak; Ukraine	Anna Wierzbowska; Poland	Cecilia Velin; Sweden
Women's 2000 m	Olena Buryak; Ukraine	Cecilia Velin; Sweden	Magdalena Lobnig; Austria
Women's lightweight 2000 m	Anna Berger; Austria	Justine Reston; Great Britain	Phuttharaksa Neegree; Thailand

=== Kickboxing ===
Event	Gold	Silver	Bronze
Men's K1 63.5 kg	Orfan Sananzade; Ukraine	Aleksandar Konovalov; Serbia	Muhamet Deskaj; Croatia
Men's K1 67 kg	Slobodan Mijajlović; Serbia	Jason Hinds; Canada	Wojciech Kazieczko; Poland
Men's K1 71 kg	Vitalii Dubina; Ukraine	Bogdan Shumarov; Bulgaria	Itay Gershon; Israel
Men's K1 75 kg	Zakaria Laaouatni; France	Michał Ronkiewicz; Poland	Datsi Datsiev; Russia
Men's K1 81 kg	Aleksandar Menković; Serbia	Aleksandar Petrov; Bulgaria	Omari Boyd; United States
Men's K1 86 kg	Dawid Kasperski; Poland	Mesud Selimović; Bosnia and Herzegovina	Omid Nosrati; Iran
Men's K1 91 kg	Igor Darmeshkin; Russia	Mateusz Pluta; Poland	Pavel Voronin; Moldova
Men's K1 +91 kg	Hamdi Saygılı; Turkey	Roman Holovatiuk; Ukraine	Michał Turyński; Poland
Women's K1 52 kg	Anna Poskrebysheva; Russia	Monika Chochlíková; Slovakia	Tam Silong; China
Women's K1 56 kg	Sandra Mašková; Czech Republic	Seda Duygu Aygün; Turkey	Małgorzata Dymus; Poland
Women's K1 60 kg	Marta Waliczek; Poland	Melissa Martínez; Mexico	Nabila Tabit; Morocco
Women's K1 65 kg	Sarèl de Jong; Netherlands	Teodora Manić; Serbia	Veronika Cmárová; Slovakia

=== Speedway ===
Event	Gold	Silver	Bronze
Men's team	Poland; Bartosz Zmarzlik; Maciej Janowski; Patryk Dudek	Australia; Jason Doyle; Chris Holder; Max Fricke	Sweden; Fredrik Lindgren; Antonio Lindbäck; Peter Ljung
