= Road speed skating at the 2017 World Games – Men's 10,000 m points race =

Road speed skating - Men's 10000m Points Race at the 2017 World Games
- Venue: Millennium Park, Wrocław, Poland
- Dates: 25 July 2017
- Competitors: 35 from 21 nations

Medalists
gold medal	(Belgium) Bart Swings
silver medal	(Italy) Daniel Niero
bronze medal	(Spain) Francisco Peula

The men's 10000 m points race in road speed skating at the 2017 World Games took place on 25 July 2017 at the Millennium Park in Wrocław, Poland.

== Competition format ==
A total of 35 athletes entered the competition. During the competition athletes can collect points on 16 sprints. Skater, who came first receives two points. Skater, who came second receives one point. At the final sprint the best three athletes receive their points, respectively: 3,2 and 1. The athlete with the most points is the winner. If at least two athletes have the same points score, the athlete who came to the finish faster receives the higher place.

== Results ==
Rank	Name	Nationality	Points	Time
1st place, gold medalist(s)	Bart Swings	Belgium	13	13:40.231
2nd place, silver medalist(s)	Daniel Niero	Italy	9	13:43.327
3rd place, bronze medalist(s)	Francisco Peula	Spain	5	13:40.365
4	Ewen Fernandez	France	5	13:43.315
5	Jorge Bolaños	Ecuador	4	13:43.712
6	Peter Michael	New Zealand	4	14:00.082
7	Livio Wenger	Switzerland	4	14:21.456
8	Ken Kuwada	Argentina	3	14:00.442
9	Felix Rijhnen	Germany	3	14:07.120
10	Liam Garriga	Australia	1	14:06.893
11	Chen Yan-cheng	Chinese Taipei		13:47.409
12	Stefano Mareschi	Italy		13:59.175
	Ezequiel Cappellano	Argentina		DNF
	Christian Kromoser	Austria		DNF
	Rolando Ossandon	Chile		DNF
	Matej Pravda	Czech Republic		DNF
	Franco Geancarlo	Ecuador		DNF
	Elton De Souza	France		DNF
	Gwendal Le Pivert	France		DNF
	Simon Albrecht	Germany		DNF
	Giuseppe Bramante	Italy		DNF
	Kay Schipper	Netherlands		DNF
	Antony Nalder	New Zealand		DNF
	Paweł Ciężki	Poland		DNF
	Gaweł Oficjalski	Poland		DNF
	Jan Świątek	Poland		DNF
	Martyn Dias	Portugal		DNF
	Diogo Marreiros	Portugal	1	DNF
	Son Geun-seong	South Korea	1	DNF
	Julio Mirena	Venezuela	1	DNF
	Kao Mao-chieh	Chinese Taipei		DNS
	Edwin Estrada	Colombia		DNS
	Andrés Jiménez	Colombia		DNS
	Milke Alejandro Paez	Mexico		DNS
	Renato Campana	Ecuador		DSQ
