= Road speed skating at the 2017 World Games – Men's 20,000 m elimination race =

Road speed skating - Men's 20,000m Elimination Race at the 2017 World Games
- Venue: Millennium Park, Wrocław, Poland
- Dates: 24 July 2017
- Competitors: 29 from 19 nations

Medalists
| gold medal | (Belgium) Bart Swings |
| silver medal | (Italy) Daniel Niero |
| bronze medal | (Spain) Francisco Peula |

The men's 20,000 m elimination race in road speed skating at the 2017 World Games took place on 24 July 2017 at the Millennium Park in Wrocław, Poland.

== Competition format ==
A total of 29 athletes entered the competition. Skaters have to race 33 laps.

== Results ==
| Rank | Name | Nationality | Time |
|---|---|---|---|
| 1st place, gold medalist(s) | Bart Swings | Belgium | 28:21.998 |
| 2nd place, silver medalist(s) | Daniel Niero | Italy | 28:22.268 |
| 3rd place, bronze medalist(s) | Francisco Peula | Spain | 28:22.548 |
| 4 | Ewen Fernandez | France | 28:22.642 |
| 5 | Peter Michael | New Zealand | 28:31.813 |
| | Jorge Bolaños | Ecuador | REL |
| | Ken Kuwada | Argentina | REL |
| | Livio Wenger | Switzerland | REL |
| | Chen Yan-cheng | Chinese Taipei | REL |
| | Giuseppe Bramante | Italy | REL |
| | Felix Rijhnen | Germany | REL |
| | Renato Campana | Ecuador | REL |
| | Elton De Souza | France | REL |
| | Julio Mirena | Venezuela | REL |
| | Stefano Mareschi | Italy | REL |
| | Son Geun-seong | South Korea | REL |
| | Liam Garriga | Australia | REL |
| | Diogo Marreiros | Portugal | REL |
| | Martyn Dias | Portugal | REL |
| | Christian Kromoser | Austria | REL |
| | Rolando Ossandon | Chile | REL |
| | Huang Yu-lin | Chinese Taipei | REL |
| | Paweł Ciężki | Poland | REL |
| | Antony Nalder | New Zealand | REL |
| | Jan Świątek | Poland | REL |
| | Milke Alejandro Paez | Mexico | DSQ |
| | Edwin Estrada | Colombia | DNS |
| | Andrés Jiménez | Colombia | DNS |
| | Gwendal Le Pivert | France | DNS |
