= Road speed skating at the 2017 World Games – Men's 500 m sprint =

Road speed skating - Men's 500m Sprint at the 2017 World Games
- Venue: Millennium Park, Wrocław, Poland
- Dates: 25 July 2017
- Competitors: 34 from 20 nations

Medalists
gold medal	(France) Gwendal Le Pivert
silver medal	(Colombia) Edwin Estrada
bronze medal	(Venezuela) Jhoan Guzmán

The men's 500 m sprint competition in road speed skating at the 2017 World Games took place on 25 July 2017 at the Millennium Park in Wrocław, Poland.

== Competition format ==
A total of 34 athletes entered the competition. In each round 2 best skaters qualify to the next round.

== Results ==
=== Preliminaries ===
Heat 1

Rank	Name	Country	Time	Notes
1	Gwendal Le Pivert	France	44.321	Q
2	Huang Yu-lin	Chinese Taipei	44.921	Q
3	Gaweł Oficjalski	Poland	45.771	
4	Jan Świątek	Poland	47.036	
5	Kao Mao-chieh	Chinese Taipei	47.360	

Heat 3

Rank	Name	Country	Time	Notes
1	Edwin Estrada	Colombia	43.204	Q
2	Michel Mulder	Netherlands	43.723	Q
3	Emanuelle Silva Santibanez	Chile	44.049	
	Livio Wenger	Switzerland	DNS	

Heat 5

Rank	Name	Country	Time	Notes
1	Giuseppe Bramante	Italy	44.913	Q
2	Renato Campana	Ecuador	45.219	Q
3	Christian Kromoser	Austria	45.953	
	Jorge Luis Martinez	Mexico	DNS	

Heat 7

Rank	Name	Country	Time	Notes
1	Martyn Dias	Portugal	47.058	Q
2	Ezequiel Cappellano	Argentina	47.063	Q
3	Antony Nalder	New Zealand	47.265	
	Ioseba Fernandez	Spain	DNS	

Heat 2

Rank	Name	Country	Time	Notes
1	Elton De Souza	France	45.618	Q
2	Lucas Silva Santibanez	Chile	46.367	Q
3	Kay Schipper	Netherlands	46.506	
4	Paweł Ciężki	Poland	46.727	
	Daniel Niero	Italy	DNS	

Heat 4

Rank	Name	Country	Time	Notes
1	Andrés Jiménez	Colombia	45.364	Q
2	Ronald Mulder	Netherlands	45.422	Q
	Stefano Mareschi	Italy	DNS	
	Bart Swings	Belgium	DNS	

Heat 6

Rank	Name	Country	Time	Notes
1	Jhoan Guzmán	Venezuela	44.530	Q
2	Diogo Marreiros	Portugal	44.606	Q
3	Franco Geancarlo	Ecuador	44.725	
4	Matej Pravda	Czech Republic	45.070	

Heat 8

Rank	Name	Country	Time	Notes
1	Simon Albrecht	Germany	47.116	Q
2	Liam Garriga	Australia	47.376	Q
	Peter Michael	New Zealand	DNS	
	Felix Rijhnen	Germany	DNS	

=== Quarterfinals ===
Heat 1

Rank	Name	Country	Time	Notes
1	Gwendal Le Pivert	France	42.634	Q
2	Simon Albrecht	Germany	42.931	Q
3	Huang Yu-lin	Chinese Taipei	43.451	
4	Liam Garriga	Australia	44.375	

Heat 3

Rank	Name	Country	Time	Notes
1	Edwin Estrada	Colombia	43.016	Q
2	Jhoan Guzmán	Venezuela	43.144	Q
3	Michel Mulder	Netherlands	43.255	
4	Diogo Marreiros	Portugal	43.813	

Heat 2

Rank	Name	Country	Time	Notes
1	Lucas Silva Santibanez	Chile	45.117	Q
2	Elton De Souza	France	45.126	Q
3	Martyn Dias	Portugal	45.220	
4	Ezequiel Cappellano	Argentina	45.308	

Heat 4

Rank	Name	Country	Time	Notes
1	Andrés Jiménez	Colombia	43.869	Q
2	Giuseppe Bramante	Italy	43.876	Q
3	Ronald Mulder	Netherlands	43.905	
4	Renato Campana	Ecuador	44.362	

=== Semifinals ===
Heat 1

Rank	Name	Country	Time	Notes
1	Gwendal Le Pivert	France	41.841	Q
2	Simon Albrecht	Germany	41.969	Q
3	Giuseppe Bramante	Italy	42.411	
4	Andrés Jiménez	Colombia	42.944	

Heat 2

Rank	Name	Country	Time	Notes
1	Edwin Estrada	Colombia	41.896	Q
2	Jhoan Guzmán	Venezuela	42.047	Q
3	Elton De Souza	France	42.201	
4	Lucas Silva Santibanez	Chile	52.616	

=== Final ===
Rank	Name	Country	Time
1st place, gold medalist(s)	Gwendal Le Pivert	France	42.218
2nd place, silver medalist(s)	Edwin Estrada	Colombia	42.249
3rd place, bronze medalist(s)	Jhoan Guzmán	Venezuela	42.405
4	Simon Albrecht	Germany	42.799
