= Road speed skating at the 2017 World Games – Women's 200 m time trial =

Road speed skating - Women's 200m Time Trial at the 2017 World Games
- Venue: Millennium Park, Wrocław, Poland
- Dates: 24 July 2017
- Competitors: 23 from 17 nations

Medalists
| gold medal | (Chile) Maria Moya |
| silver medal | (Chinese Taipei) Chen Ying-chu |
| bronze medal | (South Korea) An Yi-seul |

The women's 200 m time trial competition in road speed skating at the 2017 World Games took place on 24 July 2017 at the Millennium Park in Wrocław, Poland.

== Competition format ==
A total of 23 athletes entered the competition. From qualifications 12 skaters qualify to final.

== Results ==
=== Qualifications ===
| Rank | Athlete | Nation | Time | Note |
|---|---|---|---|---|
| 1 | Maria Moya | Chile | 18.869 | Q |
| 2 | Chen Ying-chu | Chinese Taipei | 19.241 | Q |
| 3 | Sandrine Tas | Belgium | 19.343 | Q |
| 4 | Geiny Pájaro | Colombia | 19.436 | Q |
| 5 | Ingrid Factos | Ecuador | 19.469 | Q |
| 6 | Dalia Soberanis Marenco | Guatemala | 19.567 | Q |
| 7 | Giulia Bongiorno | Italy | 19.580 | Q |
| 8 | An Yi-seul | South Korea | 19.611 | Q |
| 9 | Rocio Berbel Alt | Argentina | 19.682 | Q |
| 10 | Victoria Rodriguez | Argentina | 19.724 | Q |
| 11 | Solimar Vivas | Venezuela | 19.743 | Q |
| 12 | Erin Jackson | United States | 19.748 | Q |
| 13 | Giulia Bonechi | Italy | 19.770 | |
| 14 | Stien Vanhoutte | Belgium | 19.779 | |
| 15 | Laethisia Schimek | Germany | 19.791 | |
| 16 | Li Meng-chu | Chinese Taipei | 19.904 | |
| 17 | Sheila Posada | Spain | 20.022 | |
| 18 | Josie Hofmann | Germany | 20.273 | |
| 19 | Melissa Bellet | France | 20.325 | |
| 20 | Bianca Rosenboom | Netherlands | 20.627 | |
| 21 | Jeong Eun-chae | South Korea | 20.854 | |
| 22 | Aleksandra Glamkowska | Poland | 21.117 | |
| 23 | Vanessa Wong | Hong Kong | 21.212 | |

=== Final ===
| Rank | Athlete | Nation | Time |
|---|---|---|---|
| 1st place, gold medalist(s) | Maria Moya | Chile | 18.840 |
| 2nd place, silver medalist(s) | Chen Ying-chu | Chinese Taipei | 18.977 |
| 3rd place, bronze medalist(s) | An Yi-seul | South Korea | 19.091 |
| 4 | Geiny Pájaro | Colombia | 19.116 |
| 5 | Rocio Berbel Alt | Argentina | 19.225 |
| 6 | Erin Jackson | United States | 19.315 |
| 7 | Dalia Soberanis Marenco | Guatemala | 19.318 |
| 8 | Giulia Bongiorno | Italy | 19.387 |
| 9 | Victoria Rodriguez | Argentina | 19.422 |
| 10 | Solimar Vivas | Venezuela | 19.492 |
| 11 | Ingrid Factos | Ecuador | 19.551 |
| 12 | Sandrine Tas | Belgium | 19.657 |
