= Road speed skating at the 2017 World Games – Women's 500 m sprint =

Sports competition

Road speed skating - Women's 500m Sprint at the 2017 World Games
- Venue: Millennium Park, Wrocław, Poland
- Dates: 25 July 2017
- Competitors: 36 from 19 nations

Medalists
gold medal	(Germany) Mareike Thum
silver medal	(Chinese Taipei) Chen Ying-chu
bronze medal	(Argentina) Rocio Berbel Alt

The women's 500 m sprint competition in road speed skating at the 2017 World Games took place on 25 July 2017 at the Millennium Park in Wrocław, Poland.

== Competition format ==
A total of 34 athletes entered the competition. In each round 2 best skaters qualify to the next round.

== Results ==
=== Preliminaries ===
Heat 1

Rank	Name	Country	Time	Notes
1	Rocio Berbel Alt	Argentina	53.404	Q
2	Johana Viveros	Colombia	53.517	Q
3	Victoria Rodriguez	Argentina	53.984	
4	Dalia Soberanis Marenco	Guatemala	55.206	
	Nadja Wenger	Switzerland	DNS	

Heat 3

Rank	Name	Country	Time	Notes
1	Fabriana Arias	Colombia	54.913	Q
2	Mareike Thum	Germany	54.948	Q
3	Bianca Rosenboom	Netherlands	56.765	
4	Aleksandra Glamkowska	Poland	56.839	
	Juliette Pouydebat	France	DNS	

Heat 5

Rank	Name	Country	Time	Notes
1	Stien Vanhoutte	Belgium	53.530	Q
2	Sheila Posada	Spain	53.746	Q
3	Li Meng-chu	Chinese Taipei	53.937	
4	Giulia Bongiorno	Italy	56.935	

Heat 7

Rank	Name	Country	Time	Notes
1	Anke Vos	Belgium	57.041	Q
2	Cheng Ying-chu	Chinese Taipei	57.363	Q
3	An Yi-seul	South Korea	58.769	
	Maria Moya	Chile	DNS	

Heat 2

Rank	Name	Country	Time	Notes
1	Laethisia Schimek	Germany	54.469	Q
2	Melissa Bellet	France	54.519	Q
3	Geiny Pájaro	Colombia	54.579	
4	Vanessa Wong	Hong Kong	55.750	
5	Aleksandra Goss	Poland	56.836	

Heat 4

Rank	Name	Country	Time	Notes
1	Giulia Bonechi	Italy	54.351	Q
2	Ingrid Factos	Ecuador	54.460	Q
3	Josie Hofmann	Germany	54.755	
4	Sonia Gach	Poland	58.498	
	Clemence Halbout	France	DNS	

Heat 6

Rank	Name	Country	Time	Notes
1	Jeong Eun-chae	South Korea	1:00.143	Q
	Yang Ho-chen	Chinese Taipei	DNS	
	Francesca Lollobrigida	Italy	DNS	
	Sandrine Tas	Belgium	DNS	

Heat 8

Rank	Name	Country	Time	Notes
1	Solimar Vivas	Venezuela	58.450	Q
2	Erin Jackson	United States	58.635	Q
	Darian O'Neil	United States	DNS	
	Alejandra Traslavina Lopez	Chile	DNS	

=== Quarterfinals ===
Heat 1

Rank	Name	Country	Time	Notes
1	Rocio Berbel Alt	Argentina	47.522	Q
2	Johana Viveros	Colombia	47.561	Q
3	Solimar Vivas	Venezuela	48.343	
4	Erin Jackson	United States	48.941	

Heat 3

Rank	Name	Country	Time	Notes
1	Fabriana Arias	Colombia	48.086	Q
2	Mareike Thum	Germany	48.182	Q
3	Jeong Eun-chae	South Korea	48.563	

Heat 2

Rank	Name	Country	Time	Notes
1	Cheng Ying-chu	Chinese Taipei	47.009	Q
2	Anke Vos	Belgium	47.574	Q
3	Melissa Bellet	France	47.941	
4	Laethisia Schimek	Germany	48.101	

Heat 4

Rank	Name	Country	Time	Notes
1	Giulia Bonechi	Italy	47.748	Q
2	Sheila Posada	Spain	47.871	Q
3	Ingrid Factos	Ecuador	47.937	
4	Stien Vanhoutte	Belgium	47.996	

=== Semifinals ===
Heat 1

Rank	Name	Country	Time	Notes
1	Rocio Berbel Alt	Argentina	46.842	Q
2	Giulia Bonechi	Italy	46.905	Q
3	Johana Viveros	Colombia	47.070	
4	Sheila Posada	Spain	47.185	

Heat 2

Rank	Name	Country	Time	Notes
1	Chen Ying-chu	Chinese Taipei	46.225	Q
2	Mareike Thum	Germany	46.269	Q
3	Fabriana Arias	Colombia	46.294	
4	Anke Vos	Belgium	46.661	

=== Final ===
Rank	Name	Country	Time
1st place, gold medalist(s)	Mareike Thum	Germany	46.573
2nd place, silver medalist(s)	Chen Ying-chu	Chinese Taipei	46.675
3rd place, bronze medalist(s)	Rocio Berbel Alt	Argentina	46.742
4	Giulia Bonechi	Italy	46.907
