= Road speed skating at the 2017 World Games =

- Venue: Millennium Park
- Dates: 24–25 July 2017
- No. of events: 8
- Competitors: 84 from 25 nations

The road speed skating competition at the 2017 World Games took place from July 24 to July 25, in Wrocław in Poland, at the Millennium Park.

== Participating nations ==
- Argentina (5)
- Australia (1)
- Austria (1)
- Belgium (4)
- Chile (6)
- China (2)
- Chinese Taipei (6)
- Colombia (5)
- Czech Republic (1)
- Ecuador (4)
- France (6)
- Germany (5)
- Guatemala (1)
- Hong Kong (1)
- Italy (6)
- Mexico (2)
- Netherlands (4)
- New Zealand (2)
- Poland (6)
- Portugal (2)
- South Korea (3)
- Spain (4)
- Switzerland (2)
- United States (2)
- Venezuela (3)

== Medal table ==
Rank	Nation	Gold	Silver	Bronze	Total
1	Belgium	2	2	0	4
2	Colombia	2	1	1	4
3	Germany	1	1	1	3
4	Spain	1	0	2	3
5	France	1	0	1	2
6	Chile	1	0	0	1
7	Chinese Taipei	0	2	0	2
7	Italy	0	2	0	2
9	Argentina	0	0	1	1
9	South Korea	0	0	1	1
9	Venezuela	0	0	1	1
Totals (11 entries)		8	8	8	24

== Medalists ==
=== Men ===
Event	Gold	Silver	Bronze
200 m time trial	Ioseba Fernandez; Spain	Simon Albrecht; Germany	Gwendal Le Pivert; France
500 m sprint	Gwendal Le Pivert; France	Edwin Estrada; Colombia	Jhoan Guzmán; Venezuela
10,000 m points race	Bart Swings; Belgium	Daniel Niero; Italy	Francisco Peula; Spain
20,000 m elimination race	Bart Swings; Belgium	Daniel Niero; Italy	Francisco Peula; Spain

=== Women ===
Event	Gold	Silver	Bronze
200 m time trial	María José Moya; Chile	Chen Ying-chu; Chinese Taipei	An Yi-seul; South Korea
500 m sprint	Mareike Thum; Germany	Chen Ying-chu; Chinese Taipei	Rocío Alt; Argentina
10,000 m points race	Fabriana Arias; Colombia	Sandrine Tas; Belgium	Johana Viveros; Colombia
20,000 m elimination race	Johana Viveros; Colombia	Sandrine Tas; Belgium	Mareike Thum; Germany
