= Road speed skating at the 2017 World Games – Women's 10,000 m points race =

Road speed skating - Women's 10000m Points Race at the 2017 World Games
- Venue: Millennium Park, Wrocław, Poland
- Dates: 25 July 2017
- Competitors: 30 from 15 nations

Medalists
gold medal	(Colombia) Fabriana Arias
silver medal	(Belgium) Sandrine Tas
bronze medal	(Colombia) Johana Viveros

The women's 10000 m points race in road speed skating at the 2017 World Games took place on 25 July 2017 at the Millennium Park in Wrocław, Poland.

== Competition format ==
A total of 30 athletes entered the competition. During the competition athletes can collect points on 16 sprints. The skater who came first receives two points. The skater who came second receives one point. At the final sprint the best three athletes receive their points, respectively: 3,2 and 1. The athlete with the most points is the winner. If at least two athletes have the same points score, the athlete with the lower finish time receives the higher place.

== Results ==
Rank	Name	Nationality	Points	Time
1st place, gold medalist(s)	Fabriana Arias	Colombia	14	15:16.173
2nd place, silver medalist(s)	Sandrine Tas	Belgium	11	15:15.934
3rd place, bronze medalist(s)	Johana Viveros	Colombia	9	15:16.615
4	Yang Ho-chen	Chinese Taipei	6	15:17.306
5	Mareike Thum	Germany	5	15:18.269
6	Rocio Berbel Alt	Argentina	3	15:18.374
7	Clemence Halbout	France	3	16:14.269
8	Maite Ancin	Spain	1	15:17.762
9	Catherinne Penan Paillacar	Chile	1	15:18.596
10	Juliette Pouydebat	France	1	15:51.451
11	Giulia Lollobrigida	Italy		15:17.221
12	Darian O'Neill	United States		15:17.396
13	Aleksandra Goss	Poland		15:17.897
14	Alejandra Traslavina Lopez	Chile		15:18.879
15	Li Meng-chu	Chinese Taipei		15:20.641
16	Sheila Posada	Spain		15:20.916
17	Josie Hofmann	Germany		15:21.338
18	Bianca Rosenboom	Netherlands		15:21.660
19	Nadja Wenger	Switzerland		15:24.871
20	Vanessa Wong	Hong Kong		15:29.318
21	Laethisia Schimek	Germany		15:34.503
22	Stien Vanhoutte	Belgium		15:47.357
	Anke Vos	Belgium		DNF
	Dalia Soberanis Marenco	Guatemala		DNF
	Aleksandra Glamkowska	Poland		DNF
	Sonia Gach	Poland		DNF
	Chen Ying-chu	Chinese Taipei		DNS
	Geiny Pájaro	Colombia		DNS
	Giulia Bonechi	Italy		DNS
	Erin Jackson	United States		DNS
