= Track speed skating at the 2017 World Games =

- Venue: Millennium Park
- Dates: 21–23 July 2017
- No. of events: 10
- Competitors: 84 from 25 nations

The track speed skating competition at the 2017 World Games took place from July 21 to July 23, in Wrocław in Poland, at the Millennium Park.

== Participating nations ==
- Argentina (5)
- Australia (1)
- Austria (1)
- Belgium (4)
- Chile (6)
- China (2)
- Chinese Taipei (6)
- Colombia (5)
- Czech Republic (1)
- Ecuador (4)
- France (6)
- Germany (5)
- Guatemala (1)
- Hong Kong (1)
- Italy (6)
- Mexico (2)
- Netherlands (4)
- New Zealand (2)
- Poland (6)
- Portugal (2)
- South Korea (3)
- Spain (4)
- Switzerland (2)
- United States (2)
- Venezuela (3)

== Medal table ==
Rank	Nation	Gold	Silver	Bronze	Total
1	Colombia	4	3	0	7
2	Germany	2	1	1	4
3	Belgium	1	3	1	5
4	France	1	0	2	3
5	Italy	1	0	1	2
6	Argentina	1	0	0	1
7	South Korea	0	1	0	1
7	Switzerland	0	1	0	1
7	Venezuela	0	1	0	1
10	Chile	0	0	2	2
11	Chinese Taipei	0	0	1	1
11	Mexico	0	0	1	1
11	New Zealand	0	0	1	1
Totals (13 entries)		10	10	10	30

== Medalists ==
=== Men ===
Event	Gold	Silver	Bronze
300 m time trial	Simon Albrecht; Germany	Andrés Jiménez; Colombia	Gwendal Le Pivert; France
500 m sprint	Simon Albrecht; Germany	Jhoan Guzmán; Venezuela	Lucas Silva; Chile
1000 m sprint	Andrés Jiménez; Colombia	Bart Swings; Belgium	Elton De Souza; France
10,000 m points-elimination	Ken Kuwada; Argentina	Livio Wenger; Switzerland	Milke Paez; Mexico
15,000 m elimination race	Elton De Souza; France	Felix Rijhnen; Germany	Peter Michael; New Zealand

=== Women ===
Event	Gold	Silver	Bronze
300 m time trial	Geiny Pájaro; Colombia	An Yi-seul; South Korea	Sandrine Tas; Belgium
500 m sprint	Giulia Bonechi; Italy	Fabriana Arias; Colombia	Giulia Bongiorno; Italy
1000 m sprint	Sandrine Tas; Belgium	Fabriana Arias; Colombia	Alejandra Traslaviña; Chile
10,000 m points-elimination	Fabriana Arias; Colombia	Sandrine Tas; Belgium	Yang Ho-chen; Chinese Taipei
15,000 m elimination race	Fabriana Arias; Colombia	Sandrine Tas; Belgium	Mareike Thum; Germany
