= Road speed skating at the 2017 World Games – Women's 20,000 m elimination race =

Road speed skating - Women's 20,000m Elimination Race at the 2017 World Games
- Venue: Millennium Park, Wrocław, Poland
- Dates: 24 July 2017
- Competitors: 27 from 14 nations

Medalists
gold medal	(Colombia) Johana Viveros
silver medal	(Belgium) Sandrine Tas
bronze medal	(Germany) Mareike Thum

The women's 20,000 m elimination race in road speed skating at the 2017 World Games took place on 24 July 2017 at the Millennium Park in Wrocław, Poland.

== Competition format ==
A total of 27 athletes entered the competition. Skaters have to race 34 laps.

== Results ==
Rank	Name	Nationality	Time
1st place, gold medalist(s)	Johana Viveros	Colombia	33:03.821
2nd place, silver medalist(s)	Sandrine Tas	Belgium	33:03.911
3rd place, bronze medalist(s)	Mareike Thum	Germany	33:03.943
4	Fabriana Arias	Colombia	33:04.081
5	Li Meng-chu	Chinese Taipei	33:04.575
	Yang Ho-chen	Chinese Taipei	REL
	Alejandra Traslavina Lopez	Chile	REL
	Sheila Posada	Spain	REL
	Giulia Lollobrigida	Italy	REL
	Darian O'Neill	United States	REL
	Josie Hofmann	Germany	REL
	Maite Ancin	Spain	REL
	Clemence Halbout	France	REL
	Nadja Wenger	Switzerland	REL
	Stien Vanhoutte	Belgium	REL
	Erin Jackson	United States	REL
	Aleksandra Goss	Poland	REL
	Juliette Pouydebat	France	REL
	Bianca Rosenboom	Netherlands	REL
	Sonia Gach	Poland	REL
	Vanessa Wong	Hong Kong	REL
	Catherinne Penan Paillacar	Chile	DNS
	Chen Ying-chu	Chinese Taipei	DNS
	Geiny Pájaro	Colombia	DNS
	Giulia Bonechi	Italy	DNS
	Aleksandra Glamkowska	Poland	DNS
	An Yi-seul	South Korea	DNS
