= Road speed skating at the 2017 World Games – Men's 200 m time trial =

Road speed skating - Men's 200m Time Trial at the 2017 World Games
- Venue: Millennium Park, Wrocław, Poland
- Dates: 22 July 2017
- Competitors: 20 from 14 nations

Medalists
gold medal	(Spain) Ioseba Fernandez
silver medal	(Germany) Simon Albrecht
bronze medal	(France) Gwendal Le Pivert

The men's 200 m time trial competition in road speed skating at the 2017 World Games took place on 24 July 2017 at the Millennium Park in Wrocław, Poland.

== Competition format ==
A total of 20 athletes entered the competition. From qualifications 12 skaters qualify to final.

== Results ==
=== Qualifications ===
Rank	Athlete	Nation	Time	Note
1	Jorge Luis Martinez	Mexico	16.832	Q
2	Ioseba Fernandez	Spain	16.894	Q
3	Gwendal Le Pivert	France	17.034	Q
4	Edwin Estrada	Colombia	17.035	Q
5	Emanuelle Silva	Chile	17.048	Q
6	Jhoan Guzmán	Venezuela	17.213	Q
7	Simon Albrecht	Germany	17.252	Q
8	Ronald Mulder	Netherlands	17.408	Q
9	Michel Mulder	Netherlands	17.498	Q
10	Kao Mao-chieh	Chinese Taipei	17.541	Q
11	Andrés Jiménez	Colombia	17.625	Q
12	Lucas Silva Santibanez	Chile	17.838	Q
13	Matej Pravda	Czech Republic	18.066	
14	Huang Yu-lin	Chinese Taipei	18.206	
15	Franco Geancarlo	Ecuador	18.253	
16	Kay Schipper	Netherlands	18.446	
17	Gaweł Oficjalski	Poland	18.508	
18	Ezequiel Cappellano	Argentina	18.528	
19	Liam Garriga	Australia	18.830	
20	Jan Świątek	Poland	19.050	

=== Final ===
Rank	Athlete	Nation	Time
1st place, gold medalist(s)	Ioseba Fernandez	Spain	16.897
2nd place, silver medalist(s)	Simon Albrecht	Germany	16.907
3rd place, bronze medalist(s)	Gwendal Le Pivert	France	16.930
4	Jorge Luis Martinez	Mexico	17.040
5	Edwin Estrada	Colombia	17.140
6	Kao Mao-chieh	Chinese Taipei	17.280
7	Ronald Mulder	Netherlands	17.299
8	Emanuelle Silva	Chile	17.327
9	Andrés Jiménez	Colombia	17.400
10	Jhoan Guzmán	Venezuela	17.442
11	Michel Mulder	Netherlands	17.468
12	Lucas Silva Santibanez	Chile	17.911
