= Water skiing at the 2017 World Games =

- Venue: Old Odra River
- Dates: 25–27 July 2017
- No. of events: 8
- Competitors: 80 from 35 nations

The water skiing competition at the 2017 World Games took place from July 25 to July 27, in Wrocław in Poland, at the Old Odra River.

== Participating nations ==
- Argentina (1)
- Australia (5)
- Austria (1)
- Belarus (3)
- Belgium (2)
- Canada (3)
- Chile (2)
- China (1)
- Colombia (2)
- Czech Republic (2)
- Dominican Republic (1)
- Finland (1)
- France (5)
- Georgia (1)
- Germany (3)
- Great Britain (3)
- Greece (2)
- Ireland (1)
- Israel (1)
- Italy (7)
- Japan (4)
- Latvia (1)
- Mexico (4)
- Netherlands (1)
- Peru (1)
- Poland (1)
- Portugal (1)
- Russia (3)
- Slovakia (1)
- South Korea (2)
- Spain (1)
- Sweden (3)
- Switzerland (2)
- Ukraine (1)
- United States (7)

== Medal table ==
Rank	Nation	Gold	Silver	Bronze	Total
1	Belarus	2	0	1	3
1	Germany	2	0	1	3
3	United States	1	1	0	2
4	Australia	1	0	0	1
4	Czech Republic	1	0	0	1
4	Japan	1	0	0	1
7	France	0	3	0	3
8	Canada	0	1	0	1
8	Chile	0	1	0	1
8	Greece	0	1	0	1
8	South Korea	0	1	0	1
12	Belgium	0	0	2	2
12	Italy	0	0	2	2
14	Finland	0	0	1	1
14	Israel	0	0	1	1
Totals (15 entries)		8	8	8	24

== Events ==
=== Men ===
Event	Gold	Silver	Bronze
Tricks	Josh Briant; Australia	Pierre Ballon; France	Olivier Fortamps; Belgium
Slalom	Adam Sedlmajer; Czech Republic	Steve Neveu; Canada	Thomas Degasperi; Italy
Jump	Bojan Schipner; Germany	Rodrigo Miranda; Chile	Aliaksandr Isayeu; Belarus
Wakeboard	Shota Tezuka; Japan	Yun Sang-hyun; South Korea	Guy Firer; Israel

=== Women ===
Event	Gold	Silver	Bronze
Tricks	Natallia Berdnikava; Belarus	Clementine Lucine; France	Giannina Bonnemann; Germany
Slalom	Geena Krueger; Germany	Clementine Lucine; France	Kate Adriaensen; Belgium
Jump	Natallia Berdnikava; Belarus	Marie Vympranietsova; Greece	Jutta Menestrina; Finland
Wakeboard	Nicola Butler; United States	Erika Lang; United States	Alice Virag; Italy
