= Artistic roller skating at the 2017 World Games =

- The pictogram of Artistic roller skating.
- Venue: Świdnica Icerink
- Dates: 22–23 July 2017
- Competitors: 38 from 11 nations

The artistic roller skating tournaments at the 2017 World Games in Wrocław was played between 22 and 23 July. 38 artistic roller skating competitors, from 11 nations, participated in the tournament. The acrobatic gymnastics competition took place at Świdnica Icerink in Świdnica.

== Qualification ==
=== Summary ===
Nation	Men	Women	Mixed		Total
Nation	Single	Single	Dance	Pairs	Athletes
Argentina	1	1			2
Brazil		1			1
Chile		1			1
Chinese Taipei				1	2
Colombia		1	1	1	5
France	1		1	2	7
Germany	1				1
Italy	1	1	2	2	9
Portugal	1	1	1		4
Spain	1	1			2
United States	1	1	1		4
Total	7	8	6	6	38

== Schedule ==
- All time are Central European Summer Time (UTC+02:00)

Date	Start	Event	Phase
Saturday 22 July 2017	18:00	Men's single	Qualification
Saturday 22 July 2017	18:00	Women's single	Qualification
Saturday 22 July 2017	18:00	Dance	Qualification
Saturday 22 July 2017	18:00	Pairs	Qualification
Sunday 23 July 2017	18:00	Men's single	Final round
Sunday 23 July 2017	18:00	Women's single	Final round
Sunday 23 July 2017	18:00	Dance	Final round
Sunday 23 July 2017	18:00	Pairs	Final round

== Participating nations ==
The 38 artistic roller skating competitors, from 11 nations, participated in the tournament. The host country, Poland did not participate in this sport.

- Argentina (2)
- Brazil (1)
- Chile (1)
- Chinese Taipei (2)
- Colombia (5)
- France (7)
- Germany (1)
- Italy (9)
- Portugal (4)
- Spain (2)
- United States (4)

== Medal table ==
Rank	Nation	Gold	Silver	Bronze	Total
1	Italy	4	2	0	6
2	France	0	1	1	2
3	Spain	0	1	0	1
4	Argentina	0	0	1	1
4	Brazil	0	0	1	1
4	Portugal	0	0	1	1
Totals (6 entries)		4	4	4	12

== Medalists ==
Event	Gold		Silver		Bronze	
Men's singles	Luca Lucaroni; Italy	389.900	Pierre Merial; France	348.200	Juan Francisco Sánchez; Argentina	334.800
Ladies' singles	Silvia Nemesio; Italy	376.300	Mónica Gimeno; Spain	370.800	Rafaela Freitas; Brazil	325.100
Dance	Italy; Alessandro Spigai; Elena Leoni	191.300	Italy; Andrea Bassi; Silvia Stibilj	185.000	Portugal; Jose Souto; Mariana Souto	183.300
Pairs	Italy; Luca Lucaroni; Rebecca Tarlazzi	377.900	Italy; Marco Garelli; Sara Venerucci	362.900	France; Nathanael Fouloy; Marine Portet	330.100
