= Argentina at the World Games =

- IOC code: ARG
- NOC: Argentine Olympic Committee
- Medals: Gold 7 Silver 11 Bronze 19 Total 37

World Games appearances (overview)
- 1981; 1985; 1989; 1993; 1997; 2001; 2005; 2009; 2013; 2017; 2022; 2025

Argentina has sent delegations to the World Games since the first games in 1981, with the only excepction on the 1985 edition.

== Medal tables ==
Leading in that sport

Games	Gold	Silver	Bronze	Total
(United States) 1981 Santa Clara	0	1	2	3
(Germany) 1989 Karlsruhe	0	0	0	0
(Netherlands) 1993 Den Haag	0	1	2	3
(Finland) 1997 Lahti	1	0	1	2
(Japan) 2001 Akita	0	0	2	2
(Germany) 2005 Duisburg	1	1	3	5
(Chinese Taipei) 2009 Kaohsiung	0	1	0	1
(Colombia) 2013 Cali	0	3	2	5
(Poland) 2017 Wroclaw	3	1	2	6
(United States) 2022 Birmingham	0	1	2	3
(China) 2025 Chengdu	2	2	3	7
Totals (11 entries)	7	11	19	37

== List of medalists ==
Medal	Name	Games	Sport	Event
Silver	Raúl Busca	(United States) 1981 Santa Clara	Taekwondo	Men's Welterweight
Bronze	Juan Carlos Mangoni	(United States) 1981 Santa Clara	Taekwondo	Men's Featherweight
Bronze	Roller hockey team	(United States) 1981 Santa Clara	Roller hockey	Men's tournament
Silver	Flavio Fissolo; Gabi Múgica	(Netherlands) 1993 The Hague	Artistic roller skating	Mixed pairs
Bronze	María Eva Richardson	(Netherlands) 1993 The Hague	Inline speed skating	Women's 500 m sprint
Bronze	Roller hockey team	(Netherlands) 1993 The Hague	Roller hockey	Men's tournament
Gold	Javier Julio	(Finland) 1997 Lahti	Water skiing	Men's slalom
Bronze	Irene Frangi	(Finland) 1997 Lahti	Powerlifting	Women's middleweight
Bronze	Daniel Arriola	(Japan) 2001 Akita	Artistic roller skating	Men's free skating
Bronze	Gastón Passini; Analia Martínez	(Japan) 2001 Akita	Artistic roller skating	Mixed dance
Gold	Andrea González	(Germany) 2005 Duisburg	Inline speed skating	Women's 1000 m sprint
Silver	Andrea González	(Germany) 2005 Duisburg	Inline speed skating	Women's 300 m time trial
Bronze	Roberta Rendo	(Germany) 2005 Duisburg	Water skiing	Women's wakeboard
Bronze	Argentina national rugby sevens team	(Germany) 2005 Duisburg	Rugby sevens	Men's tournament
Bronze	Javier McCargo	(Germany) 2005 Duisburg	Inline speed skating	Men's 300 m time trial
Silver	Raúl Basualdo; Francisco Spessot	(Chinese Taipei) 2009 Kaohsiung	Boules sports	Men's raffa doubles
Silver	Argentina national rugby sevens team	(Colombia) 2013 Cali	Rugby sevens	Men's tournament
Silver	Javier Anzil; Florencia Moyano	(Colombia) 2013 Cali	Artistic roller skating	Mixed pairs
Silver	Natalia Limardo; María Victoria Maíz	(Colombia) 2013 Cali	Boules sports	Women's raffa doubles
Bronze	Romina Bolatti	(Colombia) 2013 Cali	Boules sports	Women's lyonnaise precision
Bronze	Raúl Basualdo; Francisco Spessot	(Colombia) 2013 Cali	Boules sports	Men's raffa doubles
Gold	Nicolas Pretto	(Poland) 2017 Wrocław	Boules sports	Men's lyonnaise precision
Gold	Romina Bolatti; María Victoria Maíz	(Poland) 2017 Wrocław	Boules sports	Women's Raffa Doubles
Gold	Ken Kuwada	(Poland) 2017 Wrocław	Track speed skating	Men's 10,000 m points-elimination
Silver	Argentina women's national beach handball team	(Poland) 2017 Wrocław	Beach handball	Women's tournament
Bronze	Juan Francisco Sánchez	(Poland) 2017 Wrocław	Artistic roller skating	Men's singles
Bronze	Rocio Berbel Alt	(Poland) 2017 Wrocław	Road speed skating	Women's 500 m sprint
Silver	Eugenia de Armas	(United States) 2022 Birmingham	Water skiing	Women's wakeboard
Bronze	Tobías Giorgis	(United States) 2022 Birmingham	Water skiing	Men's jump
Bronze	Argentina women's national beach handball team	(United States) 2022 Birmingham	Beach handball	Women's tournament
Gold	Argentina women's national beach handball team	(China) 2025 Chengdu	Beach handball	Women's tournament
Gold	María José Vargas	(China) 2025 Chengdu	Racquetball	Women's singles
Silver	Diego García	(China) 2025 Chengdu	Racquetball	Men's singles
Silver	Diego García; María José Vargas	(China) 2025 Chengdu	Racquetball	Mixed doubles
Bronze	Eugenia de Armas	(China) 2025 Chengdu	Wakeboarding	Women's freestyle
Bronze	Sara Banchoff Tzancoff	(China) 2025 Chengdu	Parkour	Women's speed
Bronze	Sara Banchoff Tzancoff	(China) 2025 Chengdu	Parkour	Women's freestyle

== See also ==
- Argentina at the Olympics
- Argentina at the Paralympics
- World Games all time medal table
