= Artistic roller skating at the 2017 World Games – Ladies' singles =

Artistic roller skating - women's singles at the 2017 World Games
- Venue: Sports and Recreation Centre, Świdnica, Poland
- Dates: 22–23 July 2017
- Competitors: 8 from 8 nations

Medalists
gold medal	(Italy) Silvia Nemesio
silver medal	(Spain) Monica Gimeno
bronze medal	(Brazil) Rafaela Freitas

The women's singles competition in artistic roller skating at the 2017 World Games took place from 22 to 23 July 2017 at the Sports and Recreation Centre in Świdnica, Poland.

== Competition format ==
A total of 8 skaters entered the competition. Short program and long program were held.

== Results ==
Rank	Skater	Nation	Short program	Long program
1st place, gold medalist(s)	Silvia Nemesio	Italy	90,700	376,300
2nd place, silver medalist(s)	Monica Gimeno	Spain	96,000	370,800
3rd place, bronze medalist(s)	Rafaela Freitas	Brazil	81,500	325,100
4	Elizabeth Soler	Argentina	81,000	320,400
5	Daniela Sardinha	Portugal	78,800	302,000
6	Francisca Cabrera	Chile	74,700	291,600
7	Nataly Otalora	Colombia	66,200	287,300
8	Courtney Donovan	United States	74,000	281,600
