= Lifesaving at the 2017 World Games – Men's 50m Manikin Carry =

Lifesaving - Men's 50m Manikin Carry at the 2017 World Games
- Venue: Orbita Indoor Swimming Pool, Wrocław, Poland
- Dates: 22 July 2017
- Competitors: 20 from 10 nations

Medalists
gold medal	(Germany) Danny Wieck
silver medal	(Germany) Joshua Perling
bronze medal	(Australia) Bradley Woodward

The men's 50 m manikin carry event in lifesaving at the 2017 World Games took place on 22 July 2017 at the Orbita Indoor Swimming Pool in Wrocław, Poland.

== Competition format ==
A total of 20 athletes entered the competition. Athletes with the best 8 times in heats qualifies to the final.

== Results ==
=== Heats ===
Rank	Heat	Lane	Name	Nation	Time	Notes
1	3	4	Danny Wieck	Germany	27.27	Q GR
2	2	4	Joshua Perling	Germany	29.11	Q
3	1	5	Eduardo Blasco	Spain	29.41	Q
4	2	2	Bradley Woodward	Australia	29.48	Q
5	1	4	Sacha Andrea Bartolo	Italy	29.71	Q
6	3	5	Daniele Sanna	Italy	30.16	Q
7	2	6	Steven Kent	New Zealand	30.19	Q
8	3	6	Wojciech Kotowski	Poland	30.30	Q
9	2	3	Matthew Davis	Australia	30.31	
10	3	3	Florian Laclaustra	France	30.49	
11	3	2	Joni Ceusters	Belgium	31.25	
12	2	5	Thomas Vilaceca	France	31.28	
13	1	2	Keisuke Hatano	Japan	31.47	
14	3	1	Pierre-Yves Romanini	Belgium	31.54	
15	2	7	Bartosz Makowski	Poland	31.68	
16	1	6	Carlos Perianez	Spain	31.74	
17	1	3	Naoya Hirano	Japan	32.29	
18	3	7	Jacob Hales	New Zealand	32.96	
	1	7	Zhu Zihao	China	DSQ	
	2	1	Niu Yujie	China	DSQ	

=== Final ===
Rank	Lane	Athlete	Nation	Time
1st place, gold medalist(s)	4	Danny Wieck	Germany	28.49
2nd place, silver medalist(s)	5	Joshua Perling	Germany	29.17
3rd place, bronze medalist(s)	6	Bradley Woodward	Australia	29.62
4	2	Sacha Andrea Bartolo	Italy	29.82
5	1	Steven Kent	New Zealand	29.85
6	7	Daniele Sanna	Italy	30.00
7	8	Wojciech Kotowski	Poland	30.26
8	3	Eduardo Blasco	Spain	30.43
