= Ju-jitsu at the 2017 World Games – Women's ne-waza 55 kg =

Women's ne-waza 55 kg at the 2017 World Games
- Venue: GEM Sports Complex
- Date: 28 July 2017
- Competitors: 6 from 6 nations

Medalists
1st place, gold medalist(s)		(Belgium) Amal Amjahid
2nd place, silver medalist(s)		(Mongolia) Bayarmaa Munkhgerel
3rd place, bronze medalist(s)		(Portugal) Ana Nair Marques Dias

The women's ne-waza 55 kg competition in ju-jitsu at the 2017 World Games took place on 28 July 2017 at the GEM Sports Complex in Wrocław, Poland.

== Results ==
=== Elimination round ===
==== Group A ====
Rank	Athlete	B	W	L	Pts	Score
1	Amal Amjahid (BEL)	2	2	0	200–0	+200
2	Bayarmaa Munkhgerel (MGL)	2	1	1	14–100	–86
3	Magdalena Giec (POL)	2	0	2	0–114	–114

	Score	
Amal Amjahid (BEL)	100–0	Bayarmaa Munkhgerel (MGL)
Amal Amjahid (BEL)	100–0	Magdalena Giec (POL)
Bayarmaa Munkhgerel (MGL)	14–0	Magdalena Giec (POL)

==== Group B ====
Rank	Athlete	B	W	L	Pts	Score
1	Ana Nair Marques Dias (POR)	2	2	0	104–0	+104
2	Sandra Ximena Pedraza (COL)	2	1	1	100–4	+96
3	Jessica Scricciolo (ITA)	2	0	2	0–200	–200

	Score	
Jessica Scricciolo (ITA)	0–100	Ana Nair Marques Dias (POR)
Jessica Scricciolo (ITA)	0–100	Sandra Ximena Pedraza (COL)
Ana Nair Marques Dias (POR)	4–0	Sandra Ximena Pedraza (COL)

=== Finals ===
Semifinals
Amal Amjahid (BEL)	100
Sandra Ximena Pedraza (COL)	0
Ana Nair Marques Dias (POR)	0
Bayarmaa Munkhgerel (MGL)	100

Final
Amal Amjahid (BEL)	100
Bayarmaa Munkhgerel (MGL)	0
Third place
Sandra Ximena Pedraza (COL)	2
Ana Nair Marques Dias (POR)	100
