= Artistic roller skating at the 2017 World Games – Men's singles =

Artistic roller skating - men's singles at the 2017 World Games
- Venue: Sports and Recreation Centre, Świdnica, Poland
- Dates: 22–23 July 2017
- Competitors: 7 from 7 nations

Medalists
gold medal	(Italy) Luca Lucaroni
silver medal	(France) Pierre Meriel
bronze medal	(Argentina) Juan Francisco Sanchez

The men's singles competition in artistic roller skating at the 2017 World Games took place from 22 to 23 July 2017 at the Sports and Recreation Centre in Świdnica, Poland.

== Competition format ==
A total of 7 skaters entered the competition. Short program and long program were held.

== Results ==
Rank	Skater	Nation	Short program	Long program
1st place, gold medalist(s)	Luca Lucaroni	Italy	98,300	389,900
2nd place, silver medalist(s)	Pierre Meriel	France	88,100	348,200
3rd place, bronze medalist(s)	Juan Francisco Sanchez	Argentina	83,100	334,800
4	Sergio Canales	Spain	84,600	327,000
5	Sebastiao Oliveira	Portugal	84,700	320,800
6	John Burchfield	United States	75,900	314,400
7	Markus Lell	Germany	73,800	273,300
