= Artistic roller skating at the 2017 World Games – Pairs =

Artistic roller skating - pairs at the 2017 World Games
- Venue: Sports and Recreation Centre, Świdnica, Poland
- Dates: 22–23 July 2017
- Competitors: 12 (6 pairs) from 4 nations

Medalists
gold medal	(Italy) Rebecca Tarlazzi; Luca Lucaroni
silver medal	(Italy) Sara Venerucci; Marco Garelli
bronze medal	(France) Marine Portet; Nathanael Fouloy

The pairs competition in artistic roller skating at the 2017 World Games took place from 22 to 23 July 2017 at the Sports and Recreation Centre in Świdnica, Poland.

== Competition format ==
A total of 6 pairs entered the competition. Short program and long program were held.

== Results ==
Rank	Skater	Nation	Short program	Long program
1st place, gold medalist(s)	Rebecca Tarlazzi; Luca Lucaroni	Italy	90,200	377,900
2nd place, silver medalist(s)	Sara Venerucci; Marco Garelli	Italy	89,000	362,900
3rd place, bronze medalist(s)	Marine Portet; Nathanael Fouloy	France	78,400	330,100
4	Cameliia Cherifi; Thomas Picard	France	77,100	297,600
5	Carolina Otalora; Juan Manuel Lemus Morales	Colombia	70,100	287,300
6	Tung Wen-Jen; Chien Chia-Sheng	Chinese Taipei	59,100	252,600
