= Artistic roller skating at the 2017 World Games – Dance =

Artistic roller skating - dance at the 2017 World Games
- Venue: Sports and Recreation Centre, Świdnica, Poland
- Dates: 22–23 July 2017
- Competitors: 12 (6 pairs) from 5 nations

Medalists
gold medal	(Italy) Elena Leoni; Alessandro Spigai
silver medal	(Italy) Silvia Stibilj; Andrea Bassi
bronze medal	(Portugal) Mariana Souto; Jose Souto

The dance competition in artistic roller skating at the 2017 World Games took place from 22 to 23 July 2017 at the Sports and Recreation Centre in Świdnica, Poland.

== Competition format ==
A total of 6 pairs entered the competition. Style dance and free dance were held.

== Results ==
Rank	Skater	Nation	Style dance	Free dance
1st place, gold medalist(s)	Elena Leoni; Alessandro Spigai	Italy	94,200	191,300
2nd place, silver medalist(s)	Silvia Stibilj; Andrea Bassi	Italy	90,700	185,000
3rd place, bronze medalist(s)	Mariana Souto; Jose Souto	Portugal	90,400	183,300
4	Mikenzie Bradshaw; Anthony DeLuca	United States	77,100	161,900
5	Marcela Cruz; Leonardo Parrado	Colombia	76,200	155,600
6	Isaline Dyba; Guillaume Wagner	France	71,800	146,700
