= Suicide skate =

People sometimes use In-line skates, skateboards, or other similar devices to tour around cities such as London and Paris. Such events are typically organized by a group of volunteers who operate in cooperation with the police and other local authorities, and generally use marshals to help control the traffic (see Road skating § Street skating.)

The term suicide skate emerged to describe events where a group of approximately 5–30 people use In-line skates to tour around a city without informing the police or other local authorities and without using marshals to help control the traffic.

The term suicide skate likely originated because in many cases, participants challenge themselves by skating faster or using narrower or more crowded roads than they would typically feel comfortable using. In the case of relatively inexperienced skaters, simply skating on roads without the help of marshals to control traffic could be a significant step outside their personal comfort zone. Observers might regard such behavior as reckless. However, participants do not, as navigating traffic with taxis and buses is considered part of the experience.

In some suicide skates, participants who could not keep pace with the group might be left behind. However, in other cases, the leading group of skaters may occasionally stop to wait for slower participants, ensuring that no one is left behind.

Many gumbie skaters refer to skating alone as "doing a suicide skate," which is an inappropriate use of the term.
