= Argentina at the 1997 World Games =

Argentina at the World Games 1997
- IOC code: ARG
- NOC: Argentine Olympic Committee

in Lahti, Finland 7 – 17 August 1997
- Medals Ranked 35th: Gold 1 Silver 0 Bronze 1 Total 2

World Games appearances (overview)
- 1981; 1985; 1989; 1993; 1997; 2001; 2005; 2009; 2013; 2017; 2022; 2025

Argentina competed at the 1997 World Games in Lahti, Finland, from 7 to 17 August 1997.

On these Games, water skier Javier Julio obtained the first ever gold medal for Argentina in a World Games, while Irene Frangi won a bronze medal in Powerlifting.

== Medalists ==
Medal	Name	Sport	Event
Gold	Javier Andrés Julio	Water skiing	Men's slalom
Bronze	Irene Frangi	Powerlifting	Women's middleweight

== Powerlifting ==
Athlete	Event	Exercises			Total weight	Total points	Rank
Athlete	Event	Squat	Bench press	Deadlift	Total weight	Total points	Rank
Irene Frangi	Women's middleweight	195.0	100.0	207.5	502.5	514.51	3rd place, bronze medalist(s)

== External sources ==
- Results of the 1997 World Games
- Argentina's medals at the 1997 World Games
