= Roller sports at the 2018 Central American and Caribbean Games =

- Venue: Colegio San José; Patinódromo Villa Santos
- Location: (Colombia) Barranquilla
- Dates: 21 July – 2 August

The roller sports competition at the 2018 Central American and Caribbean Games was held in Barranquilla, Colombia from 21 July to 2 August. The artistic events were held at the Colegio San José and the speed events were held at the Patinódromo Villa Santos.

== Medal summary ==
=== Artistic events ===
Event	Gold	Silver	Bronze
Men’s Free Program	Juan Sebastián Lemus (COL)	Luis Reyna (MEX)	Néstor González (CUB)
Women’s Free Program	Valentina Apolinar (COL)	Carolina Zermeño (MEX)	Micaela Marcelloni (DOM)

=== Speed events ===
==== Men's events ====
Event	Gold	Silver	Bronze
300m Time Trial	Jorge Martínez (MEX)	Jhoan Guzmán (VEN)	Edwin Estrada (COL)
500m Sprint	Edwin Estrada (COL)	Jhoan Guzmán (VEN)	Jorge Martínez (MEX)
1000m Sprint	Edwin Estrada (COL)	Jhoan Guzmán (VEN)	Jorge Martínez (MEX)
10000m Points	Álex Cujavante (COL)	Mike Páez (MEX)	Julio Mirena (VEN)
10000m Points Elimination	Álex Cujavante (COL)	Mike Páez (MEX)	Julio Mirena (VEN)

==== Women's events ====
Event	Gold	Silver	Bronze
300m Time Trial	Dalia Soberanis (GUA)	Kerstinck Sarmiento (COL)	Yarubi Bandres (VEN)
500m Sprint	Kerstinck Sarmiento (COL)	Yarubi Bandres (VEN)	Verónica Elías (MEX)
1000m Sprint	Johana Viveros (COL)	Yarubi Bandres (VEN)	Verónica Elías (MEX)
10000m Points	Johana Viveros (COL)	Valentina Letelier (MEX)	María Albarracín (VEN)
10000m Points Elimination	Johana Viveros (COL)	Valentina Letelier (MEX)	María Albarracín (VEN)

== Medal table ==
* Host nation (Colombia)

Rank	Nation	Gold	Silver	Bronze	Total
1	Colombia (COL)*	10	1	1	12
2	Mexico (MEX)	1	6	4	11
3	Guatemala (GUA)	1	0	0	1
4	Venezuela (VEN)	0	5	5	10
5	Cuba (CUB)	0	0	1	1
5	Dominican Republic (DOM)	0	0	1	1
Totals (6 entries)		12	12	12	36
