= 2023 Inline Speed Skating World Championships =

2023 World Championships
- Location: Montecchio Maggiore / Vicenza, Italy
- Dates: 26 August – 3 September

Champions
- Men: Belgium
- Women: Colombia

The 2023 Inline Speed Skating World Championships was the 71st edition of the Inline Speed Skating World Championships overall and was held in Montecchio Maggiore (for the track events) and Vicenza (for the road events) in Italy from 26 August to 3 September 2023.

== Medal summary ==
=== Men ===
Event	Gold	Silver	Bronze
Track
200m Dual Time Trial	Emanuelle Silva; Chile	Duccio Marsili; Italy	Andrés Jiménez; Colombia
500m Sprint	Andrés Jiménez; Colombia	Ricardo Verdugo; Chile	Duccio Marsili; Italy
1000m Sprint	Bart Swings; Belgium	Hugo Ramírez; Chile	Duccio Marsili; Italy
10000m points elimination	Juan Mantilla; Colombia	Martin Ferrié; France	Bart Swings; Belgium
10000m elimination	Juan Mantilla; Colombia	Bart Swings; Belgium	Martin Ferrié; France
3000m relay	Colombia; Colombia	Italy; Italy	France; France
Road
100m Sprint	Vincenzo Maiorca; Italy	Alessio Piergigli; Italy	Jorge Martínez; Mexico
1 Lap Sprint	Duccio Marsili; Italy	Daniel Milagros; Spain	Elton de Souza; France
10000m points	Bart Swings; Belgium	Jason Suttels; Belgium	Andrés Gómez; Colombia
15000m elimination	Bart Swings; Belgium	Martin Ferrié; France	Juan Mantilla; Colombia
42195m Marathon	Bart Swings; Belgium	Felix Rijhnen; Germany	Kevin Lenis; Colombia

=== Women ===
Event	Gold	Silver	Bronze
Track
200m Dual Time Trial	Sheila Muñoz; Colombia	Asja Varani; Italy	Geiny Pájaro; Colombia
500m Sprint	Asja Varani; Italy	María Fernanda Timms; Colombia	Erin Jackson; United States
1000m Sprint	Kollin Castro; Colombia	Marie Dupuy; France	Monserrat Ocampo; Mexico
10000m points elimination	Fabriana Arias; Colombia	Johana Viveros; Colombia	Edda Paluzzi; Italy
10000m elimination	Gabriela Rueda; Colombia	Angy Quintero; Venezuela	Fabriana Arias; Colombia
3000m relay	Colombia; Colombia	France; France	Italy; Italy
Road
100m Sprint	Geiny Pájaro; Colombia	Sheila Muñoz; Colombia	Chen Ying-chu; Chinese Taipei
1 Lap Sprint	Kerstinck Sarmiento; Colombia	Asja Varani; Italy	María Fernanda Timms; Colombia
10000m points	Fabriana Arias; Colombia	Gabriela Rueda; Colombia	Chang Yu-hsin; Chinese Taipei
15000m elimination	Gabriela Rueda; Colombia	Valentina Letelier; Mexico	Fabriana Arias; Colombia
42195m Marathon	Johana Viveros; Colombia	Fabriana Arias; Colombia	Gabriela Rueda; Colombia

== Medal table ==
* Host nation (Italy)

Rank	Nation	Gold	Silver	Bronze	Total
1	Colombia	14	5	9	28
2	Belgium	4	2	1	7
3	Italy*	3	5	4	12
4	Chile	1	2	0	3
5	France	0	4	3	7
6	Mexico	0	1	2	3
7	Germany	0	1	0	1
7	Spain	0	1	0	1
7	Venezuela	0	1	0	1
10	Chinese Taipei	0	0	2	2
11	United States	0	0	1	1
Totals (11 entries)		22	22	22	66
