= New Zealand at the World Games =

New Zealand has competed at every World Games since the first edition in 1981. New Zealand have won 37 medals and are currently 32nd on the all-time World Games medal table. Their most recent participation was in the 2022 World Games.

== By year ==
Year	Location	Athletes	Gold	Silver	Bronze	Total medals
1981	(United States) Santa Clara		1	0	0	1
1985	(United Kingdom) London		1	1	0	2
1989	(West Germany) Karlsruhe		1	0	0	1
1993	(Netherlands) The Hague		1	1	1	3
1997	(Finland) Lahti		0	0	1	1
2001	(Japan) Akita		1	2	1	4
2005	(Germany) Duisburg		2	4	0	6
2009	(Chinese Taipei) Kaohsiung	62	2	3	6	11
2013	(Colombia) Cali	24	1	2	0	3
2017	(Poland) Wrocław	38	0	0	2	2
2022	(United States) Birmingham	46	1	1	1	3
