= Powerlifting at the 1997 World Games – Women's middleweight =

Powerlifting women's middleweight at the 1997 World Games
- Venue: Lahti, Finland
- Date: 8 August 1997
- Competitors: 8 from 6 nations

Medalists
gold medal	(United States) Carrie Boudreau
silver medal	(Belgium) Ingeborg Marx
bronze medal	(Argentina) Irene Frangi

The women's middleweight competition in powerlifting at the 1997 World Games took place on 8 August 1997 in Lahti, Finland.

== Competition format ==
A total of 8 athletes entered the competition. Each athlete had 3 attempts in each of 3 events: squat, bench press and deadlift. Athlete, who came with the biggest score in Wilks points is the winner.

== Results ==
Rank	Athlete	Nation	Weight	Squat	Bench press	Deadlift	Total weight	Total points
1st place, gold medalist(s)	Carrie Boudreau	United States	55.3	187.5	117.5	210.0	515.0	611.96
2nd place, silver medalist(s)	Ingeborg Marx	Belgium	59.7	200.0	105.0	195.0	500.0	559.61
3rd place, bronze medalist(s)	Irene Frangi	Argentina	67.2	195.0	100.0	207.5	502.5	514.51
4	Eva Nikander	Finland	55.7	160.0	110.0	160.0	430.0	508.08
5	Ayako Ikeya	Japan	65.8	200.0	102.5	185.0	487.5	506.85
6	Eriko Himeno	Japan	60.5	157.5	102.5	190.0	450.0	498.49
	Antonietta Orsini	Italy	66.6	210.0	120.0	NM	DSQ	DSQ
	Päivi Haapoja	Finland	67.4	NM	NM	NM	DSQ	DSQ
