= Bradley Woodward =

Australian swimmer (born 1998)

Personal information
- Nationality: Australian
- Born: 5 July 1998 (age 28) Kanwal, New South Wales, Australia
- Height: 186 cm (6 ft 1 in)
- Weight: 81 kg (179 lb)

Sport
- Sport: Swimming
- Strokes: Backstroke
Medal record
Men's swimming
Representing Australia
World Championships (LC)
Silver medal – second place	2023 Fukuoka	4×100 m mixed medley
Silver medal – second place	2024 Doha	4×100 m mixed medley
Bronze medal – third place	2023 Fukuoka	4×100 m medley
Commonwealth Games
Gold medal – first place	2018 Gold Coast	4×100 m medley
Silver medal – second place	2018 Gold Coast	100 m backstroke
Silver medal – second place	2018 Gold Coast	200 m backstroke
Silver medal – second place	2022 Birmingham	200 m backstroke
Silver medal – second place	2022 Birmingham	4×100 m medley
Bronze medal – third place	2022 Birmingham	100 m backstroke
Men's lifesaving
World Games
Gold medal – first place	2017 Wrocław	200 m obstacle
Silver medal – second place	2017 Wrocław	4×50 m medley
Bronze medal – third place	2017 Wrocław	50 m manikin carry

Bradley Woodward (born 5 July 1998) is an Australian swimmer. He competed at the 2018 Commonwealth Games, winning silver in the 100 metre and the 200 metre backstroke events. Woodward also competed in lifesaving at the 2017 World Games, winning three medals.
