= Taekwondo at the 1981 World Games =

Taekwondo competition

The World Games I taekwondo events in ten weight categories were held on July 29-31, 1981, at Toso Pavilion on the Santa Clara University campus. These were the first World Games, an international quadrennial multi-sport event, and were held in Santa Clara, California in the United States. The South Korean taekwondo athletes were favored to sweep the gold medals in all ten weight classes. The victory of a Canadian athlete in the heavyweight class was called "the biggest upset of World Games I."

== Medalists ==
Event	Gold	Silver	Bronze
Men
Finweight	Ki-moon KWON (KOR)	Dea SUNG LEE (USA)	Aldo CODAZZO (ITA); Reinhard LANGER (GER)
Flyweight	Ki-mo YANG (KOR)	Franco BENITO (ESP)	Fernando CELADA (MEX); Dominic MAELIONICO (ITA)
Bantamweight	Bum-soo CHUNG (KOR)	Oscar AGUILAR (MEX)	Serge LANGLOIS (CAN); Dicostanzo GERMIA (ITA)
Featherweight	Jun-kul LEE (KOR)	Jorge GARCIA (ESP)	Raffaele MARCHIONE (ITA); Juan Carlos Mangoni (ARG)
Lightweight	Yung-kuk KIM (KOR)	Alphonse QAHHAAR (USA)	Luige SIENORE (ITA); Kone SOWLEYMANE (CIV)
Welterweight	Jeong-kuk KIM (KOR)	Raul BUSCA (ARG)	Antonio HERANDE (MEX); Ruben RHIJS (NED)
Light Middleweight	Il-nam OH (KOR)	Chul HOE KIM (USA)	Patrice REMARCK (CIV); Helmut GARTNER (GER)
Middleweight	Dong-Jun LEE (KOR)	Jersey LONG (CAN)	Andreas SCHEFFLER (GER); Jugi D'ORIANO (ITA)
Light Heavyweight	Chan JUNG (KOR)	Cisse ABOUAYE (CIV)	Tom FEDERLE (USA); Hsin-nien SUN (TPE)
Heavyweight	Darrell HANEGAN (CAN)	Chong-man PARK (KOR)	Harry PRIJS (NED); Miguel ESQUIVEL (MEX)

== Details ==
=== Finweight ===
First round – Cesar Moran, Mexico, bye; Ki-moon Kwong, Korea, d. Emilio Azofra, Spain; Reinhard Langer, W. Germany, d. Kenny Couch, Australia; Aldo Codazzo, Italy, d. Yong-ho Park, Canada; Dae Sung Lee, U.S., d. Ching-sha Wang, Chinese Taipei.

Second round – Kwong d. Moran.

Final – Ki-moon Kwong d. Reinhard Langer, W. Germany; Dae Sung Lee, U.S., d. Aldo Codazzo, Italy. Gold, Kwong. Silver, Lee. Bronze, Langer and Codazzo.

=== Flyweight ===
First round – Rund Wong Fat, Netherlands, bye; Fernando Celada, Mexico, d. Chen-Chia Su, Chinese Taipei; Franco Banito, Spain, d. Anarjit Dosanjh, Canada; Salin Abel, Argentina, bye; Dominic Maelionico, Italy, d. Turgay Ertugral, W. Germany; Young Joon Kim, U.S., d. Tae Kim, Australia; Ki-mo Yang, Korea, bye.

Second round – Maelionico d. Abel; Yang d. Kim.

Final – Ki-mo Yang, Korea, d. Maelionico, Italy; Franco Banito, Spain, d. Fernando Celada, Mexico. Gold, Yang. Silver, Benito. Bronze, Maelionico and Celada.

=== Bantamweight ===
First round – Chung Sik Choi, U.S., bye; Dicostanzo Germia, Italy, d. Tony Gibbs, Australia; Bum-soo Chung, Korea, d. Alphonse Kraidy, Ivory Coast; Jesus Benito, Spain, d. Ming Hui Chang, Chinese Taipei; Serge Langlois, Canada, bye; Rodca Miguel, Argentina, d. Jimmy de Fretes, Netherlands; Oscar Aguilar, Mexico, d. John Henry, Malaysia; Michael Pizybyla, W. Germany, bye.

Second round – Germia d. Choi; Chung d. Benito; Langlois d. Miguel; Aguilar d. Pizybyla.

Final – Bum-soo Chung, Korea d. Dicostanzo Germia, Italy; Oscar Aguilar, Mexico d. Serge Langlois, Canada; Gold, Chung; Silver, Aguilar; Bronze, Germia and Langlois.

=== Featherweight ===
Final – Jun-kul Lee, Korea d. Juan Mangoni, Argentina; Jorge Garcia, Spain d. Raffaele Marchione, Italy. Gold, Lee; Silver, Garcia; Bronze, Mangoni and Marchione.

=== Lightweight ===
Final – Yung-kuk Kim, Korea d. Kone Sowleymane, Ivory Coast; Alphonse Qahhaar, USA d. Luige Sienore, Italy. Gold, Kim; Silver, Qahhaar, USA; Bronze, Sowleymane and Sienore.

=== Welterweight ===
First round – Paul Rusca, Argentina, bye; Harald Scharmann, West Germany d. Chien-hsueh Wang, Chinese Taipei; Marcel Delph, Canada d. Wong Siow Pang, Malaysia; Ruben Rhijs, Netherlands d. Michael O'Malley, USA; Michael Eddy, Australia, bye; Jeong-kuk Kim, Korea d. Hali Bamba, Ivory Coast; Antonio Herande, Mexico d. Scipione Massari, Italy; Julio Mora, Ecuador, bye.

Second round – Rusca d. Scharmann; Rhijs d. Delph; Kim d. Eddy; Herande d. Mora.

Final – Rusca d. Rhijs; Kim d. Herande; Gold, Kim; Silver, Rusca; Bronze, Rhijs and Herande.

=== Light Middleweight ===
First round – Bruno Barberio, Italy, bye; Helmut Gartner, West Germany d. Livio Montiel, Argentina; Hans Brugmans, Netherlands d. Ming-te Huang, Chinese Taipei; Chui Hoe Kim, USA d. John Wong, Malaysia; Paul McDonald, Canada, bye; Patrice Remarck, Ivory Coast d. Manuel Jurando, Mexico; A. Garrido, Spain d. Geoffrey Rees, Australia; Il-nam Oh, Korea, bye.

Second round – Gartner d. Barberio; Kim d. Brugmans; Remarck d. McDonald; Oh d. Garrido.

Final – Kim d. Gartner; Oh d. Remarck; Gold, Oh; Silver, Kim; Bronze, Gartner and Remarck.

=== Middleweight ===
First round – Jersey Long, Canada, bye; Patrice Remarck, Ivory Coast, d. Javier Mayan, Mexico; Jugi D'Oriano, Italy, d. Juan Carlo Escolano, Spain; Earl Taylor, U.S., bye; Jose Sanchez, Argentina, bye; Doong-joon Lee, Korea, d. Chih Chao Wang, Chinese Taipei; Andreas Scheffler, W. Germany, knocked out Gerrard Von der Berg, Netherlands; Damian McConachy, Australia, bye.

Second round – Long d. Remarck; D'Oriano d. Taylor; Lee d. Sanchez; Scheffler d. McConachy.

Final – Long d. D'Oriano; Lee d. Scheduler; Gold, Lee; Silver, Long; Bronze, Scheffler and D'Oriano

=== Light heavyweight ===
First round – Cisse Abouaye, Ivory Coast, bye; Ireno Fargas, Spain, knocked out Ben Oude Luttikhuis, Netherlands; Jean Picard, Canada, d. Duvan Velez, Ecuador; Thomas Roth, Mexico, d. (?) Tom Federle, U.S.; Felix Solas, Argentina, bye; Hsin-nien Sun, China Taipei, d. Carriatorz Walter, Italy; Colin Handley, Australia, d. Eugen Nefedow, W. Germany; Chan Jung, Korea, bye.

Second round – Abouaye d. Fargas; Roth (?) d. Picard; Sun TKO over Solas; Jung d. Handley.

Final – Abouaye d. Federle; Chan d. Sun. Gold, Jung; Silver, Abouaye; Bronze, Federle and Sun

=== Heavyweight ===
First round – Miguel Esquivel, Mexico, bye; Michael Arndt, W. Germany, d. Puppo Ricardo, Argentina; Ching-man Park, Korea, d. Kim Royce, U.S.; Harry Prijs, Netherlands, d. Chung-Il Teng, Chinese Taipei; Darrell Hanegan, Canada, d. Keith Whittemore, Australia; Cvozzo Bruno, Italy, bye.

Second round – Esquivel d. Arndt; Hannegan knocked out Bruno, 2nd round.

Final – Darrell Hanegan, Canada, d. Park Chong Man, Korea. Gold, Hanegan. Silver, Man. Bronze, Harry Prijs, Netherlands, and Miguel Esquivel, Mexico.
