= Johana Viveros =

Colombian speed skater

Personal information
- Full name: Johana Viveros Mondragón
- Born: 3 April 1994 (age 32) Cali, Colombia

Sport
- Country: Colombia
- Sport: Speed skating
Medal record
Representing Colombia
Event	1st	2nd	3rd
World Championships	1	1	0
World Games	5	1	1
Pan American Games	1	0	0
CAC Games	3	0	0
Total	10	2	1
Women's road inline speed skating
World Championships
Gold medal – first place	2023 Vicenza	Marathon
World Games
Gold medal – first place	2017 Wrocław	20000 m elimination
Gold medal – first place	2022 Birmingham	15000 m elimination
Silver medal – second place	2022 Birmingham	10000 m points
Bronze medal – third place	2017 Wrocław	10000 m points
Women's track inline speed skating
World Championships
Silver medal – second place	2023 Montecchio Maggiore	10000 m points
World Games
Gold medal – first place	2022 Birmingham	1000 m sprint
Gold medal – first place	2022 Birmingham	10000 m elimination
Gold medal – first place	2022 Birmingham	10000 m points
Pan American Games
Gold medal – first place	2019 Lima	10000 m elimination
Central American and Caribbean Games
Gold medal – first place	2018 Barranquilla	1000 m sprint
Gold medal – first place	2018 Barranquilla	10000 m elimination
Gold medal – first place	2018 Barranquilla	10000 m points

Johana Viveros Mondragón (born 3 April 1994) is a Colombian inline speedskater who has won multiple medals at the Central American and Caribbean Games, Inline Speed Skating World Championships, Pan American Games and World Games.

== Career ==
Viveros started skating at the age of 10 in the Alfonso Barberena neighborhood park in Cali. She then went on to the Luz Mery Tristán Skating Club where she received a scholarship to continue training. She qualified for the 2015 Pan American Games in Toronto, Canada, but she fractured her elbow. At the 2018 Inline Speed Skating World Championships, she won three gold, two silver and one bronze medals, being the most awarded athlete of the competition and crowned champion along with the national team. At the 2018 Central American and Caribbean Games held in Barranquilla in 2018, she also managed to win three gold medals.

She represented Colombia at the 2022 World Games held in Birmingham, United States. She won medals in both road and track speed skating.
