= Guatemala at the 2017 World Games =

Guatemala at the World Games 2017
- IOC code: GUA
- NOC: Guatemalan Olympic Committee
- Website: www.cog.org.gt

in Wrocław, Poland 24 July 2017 – 25 July 2017
- Competitors: 1 in 1 sport
- Medals: Gold 0 Silver 0 Bronze 0 Total 0

World Games appearances
- 1981; 1985; 1989; 1993; 1997; 2001; 2005; 2009; 2013; 2017; 2022; 2025

Guatemala competed at the World Games 2017 in Wrocław, Poland from 24 July to 25 July Guatemala didn't win any medal in the multi-sport event.

== Competitors ==
Sports	Men	Women	Total	Events
Track speed skating	1	0	1	1
Total	1	0	1	1

== Speed skating ==
Guatemala had qualified one athlete for the multi-sport event.

Soberanis Morenco in the women's speed skating events.
