= New Zealand at the 2017 World Games =

New Zealand at the World Games 2017
- IOC code: NZL
- NOC: New Zealand Olympic Committee

in Wrocław, Poland 20 July 2017 – 30 July 2017
- Competitors: 6 in 4 sports
- Medals Ranked 56th: Gold 0 Silver 0 Bronze 2 Total 2

World Games appearances (overview)
- 1981; 1985; 1989; 1993; 1997; 2001; 2005; 2009; 2013; 2017; 2022; 2025

New Zealand competed at the World Games 2017 in Wrocław, Poland, from July 20, 2017, to July 30, 2017. It will be New Zealand's tenth appearance at the World Games.

== Competitors ==
Sports	Men	Women	Total	Events
Trampoline	0	1	1	1
Billiard sports	1	1	2	1
Karate	0	1	1	1
Canoe polo	1	1	2	1
Total	2	4	6	4

== Gymnastic ==
=== Trampoline ===
New Zealand has qualified at the 2017 World Games:

- Women's Individual Double Mini Trampoline - 1 quota

== Billiard sports ==
=== Pool ===
- Men's 9-Ball Pool Individual - 1 quota place (Matthew Edwards)
- Women's 9-Ball Pool Individual - 1 quota place (Molrudee Kasemchaiyanan)

== Karate ==
New Zealand has qualified at the 2017 World Games:

- Women's Kata Individual – 1 quota place (Alexandrea Anacan)

== Canoe sports ==
=== Canoe polo ===
New Zealand has qualified at the 2017 World Games:

- Men's Team Event - 1 quote place (Qualified at 2016 World Championships)
- Women's Team Event - 1 quota place (Qualified at 2016 World Championships)
