= Hong Kong at the 2017 World Games =

- IOC code: HKG

in Wrocław, Poland 20 July 2017 – 30 July 2017
- Medals Ranked 50th: Gold 0 Silver 1 Bronze 1 Total 2

World Games appearances
- 1981; 1985; 1989; 1993; 1997; 2001; 2005; 2009; 2013; 2017; 2022; 2025

Hong Kong competed at the 2017 World Games held in Wrocław, Poland.

== Medalists ==
Medal	Name	Sport	Event
Silver	Joey Chan	Squash	Women's singles
Bronze	Wu Siu Hong; Michael Mak	Bowling	Men's doubles

== Bowling ==
Wu Siu Hong and Michael Mak won the bronze medal in the men's doubles event.

== Squash ==
Joey Chan won the silver medal in the women's singles event.
