= Argentina at the 2017 World Games =

Argentina at the World Games 2017
- IOC code: ARG
- NOC: Argentine Olympic Committee

in Wrocław, Poland 20 July 2017 – 30 July 2017
- Competitors: 43 in 9 sports
- Medals Ranked 23rd: Gold 3 Silver 1 Bronze 2 Total 6

World Games appearances (overview)
- 1981; 1985; 1989; 1993; 1997; 2001; 2005; 2009; 2013; 2017; 2022; 2025

Argentina competed at the World Games 2017 in Wrocław, Poland, from July 20, 2017 to July 30, 2017.

It was Argentina's tenth World Games, and was one of over 100 countries that participated.

The delegation was composed of forty-three athletes, including both males and females, who competed in nine sports. However, the team didn't receive official support from the Nation's Secretary of Sports, and some athletes who could not fund their own trips were not able to compete.

Among those who qualified but were not able to attend were the gymnasts Lucas Adorno and Mara Colombo.

In total, Argentina won six medals: three gold, one silver, and two bronze, which earned Argentina the twenty-third position in the medal count.

With three gold medals, Argentina broke its record of medals, which was accomplished in 2009 in Kaohsiung and achieved the best performance in its history.

== Medalists ==
Medal	Name	Sport	Event
Gold	Nicolas Pretto	Boules sports	Men's lyonnaise precision
Gold	Romina Bolatti; Maria Victoria Maiz	Boules sports	Women's raffa doubles
Gold	Ken Kuwada	Track speed skating	Men's 10,000m points elimination race
Silver	Argentina women's national beach handball team: Daniela Aguzzi; Rocio Barros; Florencia Bericio; Rayen Cardenas; Ivana Eliges; Florencia Ibarra; Celeste Meccia; Agustina Mirotta; Carolina Rossi; Luciana Scordamaglia	Beach handball	Women's tournament
Bronze	Juan Francisco Sanchez	Artistic roller skating	Men's singles
Bronze	Rocio Berbel Alt	Road speed skating	Women's 500 m sprint

== Competitors ==
Sports	Men	Women	Total	Events
Artistic roller skating	1	1	2	2
Beach handball	0	10	10	1
Boules sports	1	2	3	3
Fistball	8	0	8	1
Karate	0	1	1	1
Road speed skating	2	2	4	7
Roller hockey	14	0	14	1
Track speed skating	2	1	3	8
Water skiing	1	0	1	1
Total	27	16	43	25

== Artistic roller skating ==
Argentina qualified for the games with one male and one female.

Athlete	Event	Short program		Long program	
Athlete	Event	Score	Rank	Score	Rank
Juan Francisco Sanchez	Men's singles	83.100	5	334.800	3rd place, bronze medalist(s)
Elizabeth Soler	Women's singles	81.000	4	320.400	4

== Beach handball ==
Argentina's women's national team qualified for the games. The women's team won the silver medal in the women's tournament.

Summary

Team	Event	Group Stage				Quarterfinal	Semifinal / Pl.	Final / BM / Pl.	
Team	Event	Opposition Score	Opposition Score	Opposition Score	Rank	Opposition Score	Opposition Score	Opposition Score	Rank
Argentina women's	Women's Tournament	Spain; L 1-2	Norway; L 0-2	Tunisia; W 2-0	3	Australia; W 2-1	Norway; W 2-1	Brazil; L 1-2	2nd place, silver medalist(s)

== Fistball ==
Argentina qualified for the 2017 World Games in the Fistball Men's Team event.

== Gymnastic ==
=== Trampoline ===
Argentina qualified for the 2017 World Games:

- Men's Individual Double Mini Trampoline - 1 quota
- Women's Individual Double Mini Trampoline - 1 quota
