= Venezuela at the 2017 World Games =

- IOC code: VEN

in Wrocław, Poland 20 July 2017 – 30 July 2017
- Medals: Gold 0 Silver 3 Bronze 3 Total 6

World Games appearances
- 1981; 1985; 1989; 1993; 1997; 2001; 2005; 2009; 2013; 2017; 2022; 2025

Venezuela competed at the 2017 World Games held in Wrocław, Poland.

== Bowling ==
Ildemaro Ruíz won the silver medal in the men's singles event.

Massimiliano Fridegotto and Ildemaro Ruíz won the silver medal in the men's doubles event.

== Karate ==
Antonio Díaz won the bronze medal in the men's kata event.

== Powerlifting ==
Yenifer Canelón won the bronze medal in the women's heavyweight event.

== Road speed skating ==
Jhoan Guzmán won the bronze medal in the men's 500 metre sprint.

== Track speed skating ==
Jhoan Guzmán won the silver medal in the men's 500 metre sprint.
