= South Korea at the 2017 World Games =

South Korea at the World Games 2017
- IOC code: KOR
- NOC: Korean Olympic Committee

in Wrocław, Poland 20 July 2017 – 30 July 2017
- Competitors: 42 in 12 sports

World Games appearances
- 1981; 1985; 1989; 1993; 1997; 2001; 2005; 2009; 2013; 2017; 2022; 2025

South Korea competed at the World Games 2017 in Wrocław, Poland, from 20 July 2017 to 30 July 2017.

== Competitors ==
Competitors are as follows:

Sports	Men	Women	Total	Events
Rhythmic gymnastics	0	1	1	1
Cue sports	0	1	1	1
Dancesport	2	2	4	1
Bowling	2	2	4	2
Sports climbing	0	1	1	1
Water skiing	1	1	2	2
Finswimming	3	5	8	4
Archery	0	1	1	1
Indoor rowing	2	2	4	4
Aerobic gymnastics	7	5	12	3
Road speed skating	1	2	3	4
Muaythai	1	0	1	1
Total	18	24	42	

== Gymnastic ==
=== Rhythmic gymnastics ===
South Korea has qualified at the 2017 World Games:

- Women's individual event - 1 quota
