= Road skating =

Sport discipline

Hundreds of skaters skate into Manhattanhenge from Union Square

Road skating (urban skating) is the sport of skating (inline skating or quad roller skating) on roads, much like road cycling. It shares much with inline speed skating.

Roadskaters often skate in tight packs, drafting each other and sharing the lead, which allows a pack to travel faster than an individual skater. The individual members of a pack use comparatively less energy than the lone skater traveling at the same speed. Even the lead skater in the pack enjoys an advantage from the drafting skaters behind.

While gliding downhill, an inline skater in a tucked position can achieve speeds that exceed the speed of a tucked cyclist. This is due to lower wind resistance. The rolling resistance is similar for a cyclist and a skater — it is only when actively skating (i.e., in the skating stroke) that the skater incurs greater resistance. Skating is roughly 50% slower than cycling on flat ground.

Skaters routinely achieve downhill speeds of 60 km/h (37 mph), similar to cyclists. Compared to cyclists, though, skaters particularly suffer on uphills, when the drafting advantage disappears.

A skating paceline going down hills may easily achieve speeds faster than a cycling paceline of equal length. The reason is that the road skating paceline has a much more efficient draft effect. The draft effect in road skating is superior for three reasons:

1. each skater can be much closer to the person in front of her, whereas each cyclist is limited by the distance of the wheels;
2. each skater gaining inertia energy from being in the draft can translate this energy to the person in front of her by maintaining contact (usually by placing a hand on the lower back of the person in front); and
3. the skater has much less equipment-related aerodynamic drag than the cyclist.

== Cross training ==
Skating (especially road skating) is much more like cycling than running in terms of the muscles employed. Cyclists and skaters commonly participate in each other's sports as cross-training. Runners often switch to road skating due to injuries associated with the impact of running. Many skiers use road skating for off-season and pre-season conditioning as well. In addition, skating is an excellent cross-training activity for a wide range of other sports due to the lateral (side-to-side) motion involved in the skating stride.

== Drafting ==
Road skating in a pack has some common rules that most skaters follow. Such rules include skating in single file except when passing or moving into the back of the pack, rotational "pulling" in the front of the pack to shield the rest of the pack from the wind, and signaling about road conditions, hazards and alike to skaters in the back of the pack. Single-file skating in a pack is mostly dictated by the need to minimize the impact of air resistance on the pack, thus shielding from the wind behind the back of the first person who is "pulling" the pack. "Pulling" is associated with up to 30% higher energy exertion; thus, it is generally accepted that skaters rotate through "pulls," allowing for equal energy exertion through the pack. A skater who has finished "pulling" steps out of the pack and slowly moves into the back of the pack. The skater in front of the pack has a better view of the road ahead and points and calls out road hazards (holes, cracks, water puddles, cars, etc.).

== Organized group skates ==
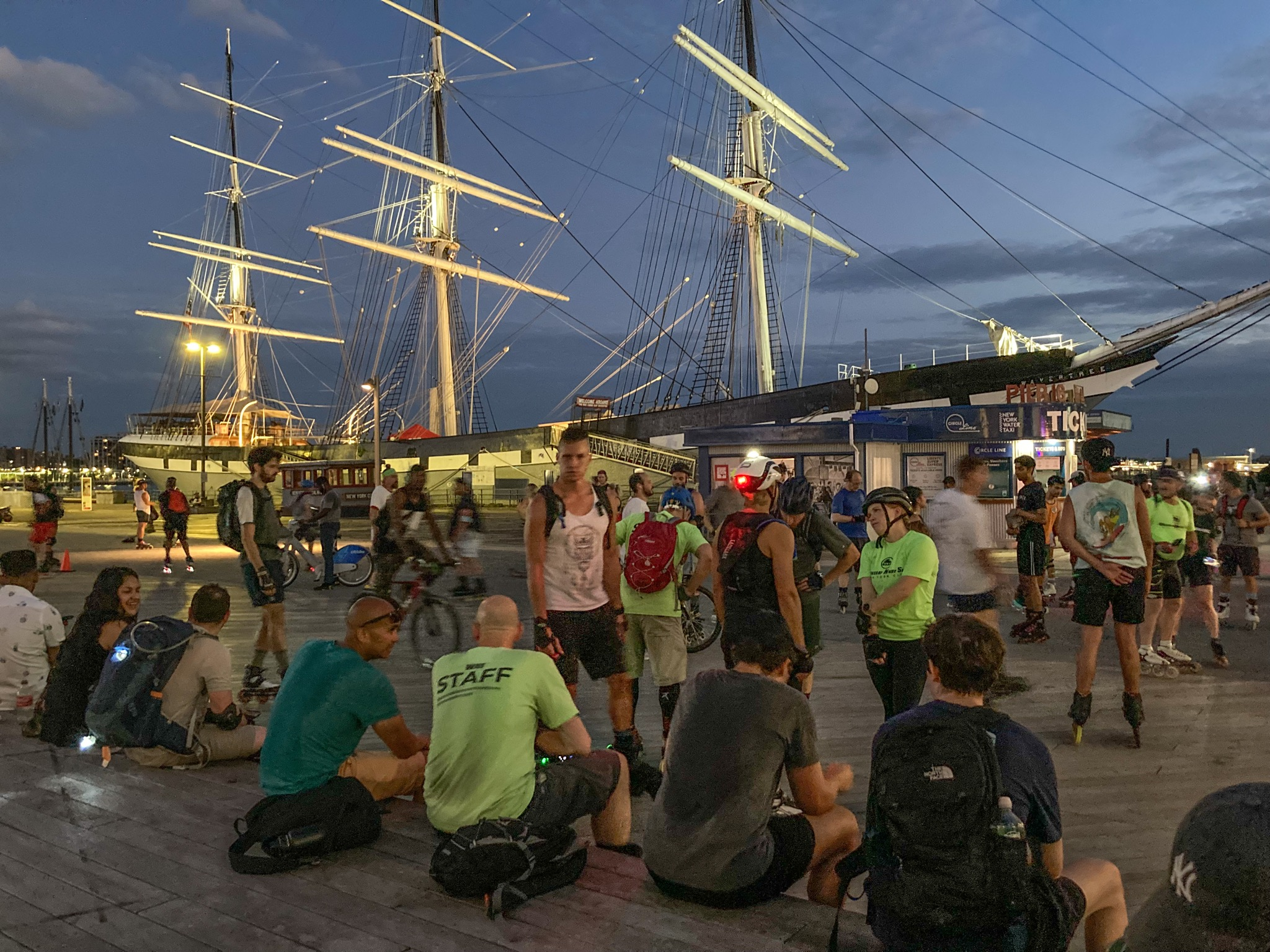
Wednesday Night Skate NYC at South Street Seaport

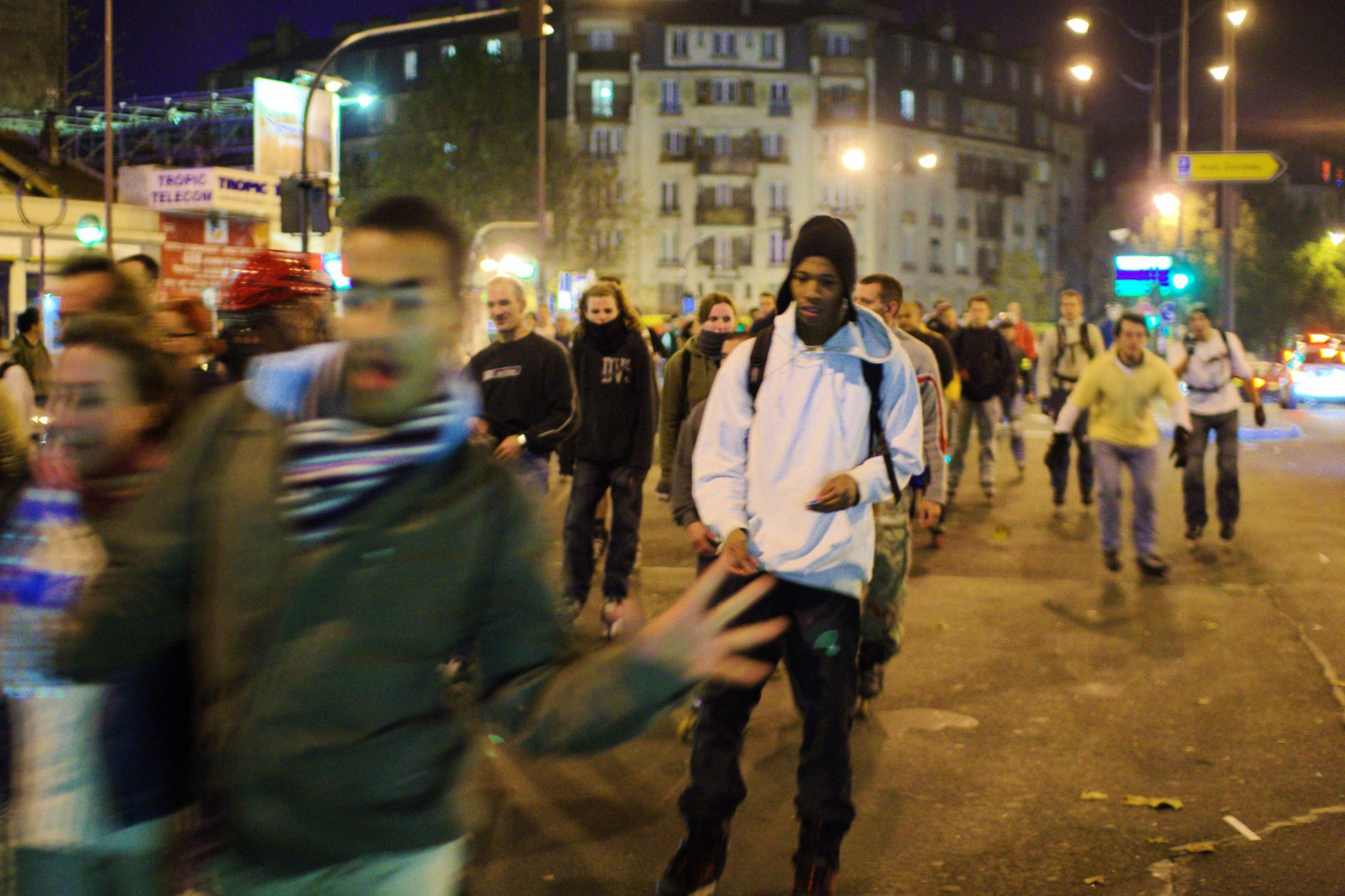
Group skaters in Paris, France.

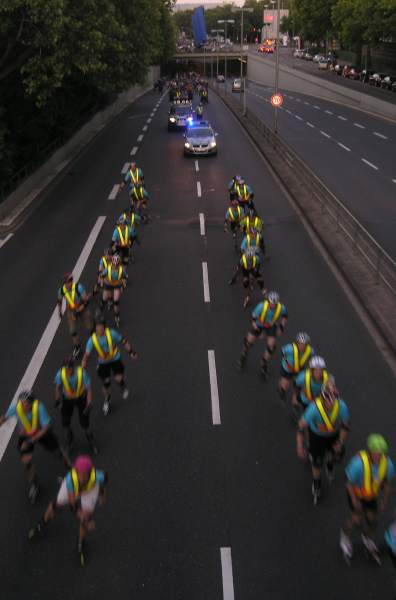
Guardes in front of the group

Road skating often take place in groups on public roads. Such group skates can be formal affairs, with prespecified routes, marshals and, at times, police escorts or ad hoc gatherings of like minded individuals.

There are organized group skates in a number of cities around the world. Some of the largest are in Paris (the 'Pari Roller'), Munich and Berlin. London also has an active group skating scene. LondonSkate runs free events on Wednesday evenings; and a smaller scene can be found in Nottingham.

Such events may involve several hundred participants, so to minimize disruption to other road users the events are usually operated in coordination with the police and other relevant local authorities, such as bus operators. Therefore, the route must be decided in advance. Volunteer marshals help to control traffic at busy junctions. Their goals are to minimize disruption to all road users and to ensure the safety of the skaters.

These events are usually free to enter. Normally, the only requirement is that each individual skater can keep pace with the rest of the group and can turn and stop safely. Participants that don't meet these requirements are usually asked to leave the skate and encouraged to practice their skating skills for a few days and return to the next group skate event.

=== Wednesday Night Skate NYC ===
Wednesday Night Skate NYC is also known as WNS NYC. It’s one of several well-established groups in the city. WNS is run by volunteers since the late 1990s. Every Wednesday from April to October, weather permitting, organizers show up wearing yellow-green vests at the south-side steps of Union Square around 7:45pm. By then a sizable crowd of skaters have already gathered at the steps. At 8pm an organizer gives a brief safety speech and introduces the route planner of the week, the leader of the day, and the sweeper. The leader signals followers to take breaks at pre-designated stops along the route, so that the rest of the group may catch up, with the sweeper being the last person to arrive at each stop. The route circles back to Union Square, where a day’s skating concludes. On average a trip takes 2 hours and covers 12 miles.

=== Friday Night Skate ===
A (often abbreviated to FNS) is a group skate occurring on Friday nights, a common night for a group skate in many cities throughout the world. In Vienna (since at least 2011) and Graz (Austria) once in a year – around resp. on Carfree Day, 22 September – one of the 20–25 km long tours runs for a small part on an urban highway. FNS run there weekly, if streets are dry, since 1999 in Vienna as a "political demonstration" by activists of the Green Party, starting at 21:00 partially in dark night and since 2000 in Graz as a sporting event, that has to pay fees to the city and accompanying police, starting at 19:30, reaching dawn only in late August.

=== Full Moon Skate ===
A generic name for an event which typically consists of a group of individuals participating in road skating during a night when the moon is in its full phase.

== See also ==
- Inline skates
- Suicide skate
