= Switzerland at the 2017 World Games =

- IOC code: SUI
- NOC: Swiss Olympic Association

in Wrocław, Poland 20 July 2017 – 30 July 2017
- Competitors: 11 in 2 sports

World Games appearances
- 1981; 1985; 1989; 1993; 1997; 2001; 2005; 2009; 2013; 2017; 2022; 2025

Switzerland competed at the 2017 World Games in Wrocław, Poland, from July 20, 2017 to July, 30 2017.

== Competitors ==
Sports	Men	Women	Total	Events
Fistball	9	0	9	1
Snooker	1	0	1	1
Trampoline	0	2	2	1
Total	10	2	12	3

== Gymnastic ==
=== Trampoline ===
Switzerland has qualified at the 2017 World Games:

- Women's Synchronized Trampoline - 1 quota

=== Snooker ===
Alexander Ursenbacher has qualified at the 2017 World Games

== Fistball ==
Switzerland has qualified at the 2017 World Games in the Fistball Men Team event.

== Tug of war ==
Switzerland won the gold medal in the men's outdoor 700 kg event and the silver medal in the men's outdoor 640 kg event.
