= Portugal at the 2017 World Games =

Portugal at the World Games 2017
- IOC code: POR
- NOC: Olympic Committee of Portugal

in Wrocław, Poland 20 July 2017 – 30 July 2017
- Competitors: 6 in 1 sport
- Medals Ranked 55th: Gold 0 Silver 0 Bronze 3 Total 3

World Games appearances
- 1981; 1985; 1989; 1993; 1997; 2001; 2005; 2009; 2013; 2017; 2022; 2025

Portugal competed at the World Games 2017 in Wrocław, Poland, from July 20, 2017 to July 30, 2017.

== Competitors ==
Sports	Men	Women	Total	Events
Trampoline	3	3	6	4
Total	3	3	6	4

== Gymnastic ==
=== Trampoline ===
Portugal has qualified at the 2017 World Games:

- Men's Individual Double Mini Trampoline - 1 quota
- Men's Synchronized Trampoline - 1 quota
- Women's Individual Double Mini Trampoline - 1 quota
- Women's Synchronized Trampoline - 1 quota
