= Chile at the 2017 World Games =

- IOC code: CHI
- NOC: Chilean Olympic Committee

in Wrocław, Poland 20 July 2017 – 30 July 2017
- Competitors: 0 in 0 sports
- Medals: Gold 1 Silver 1 Bronze 2 Total 4

World Games appearances
- 1981; 1985; 1989; 1993; 1997; 2001; 2005; 2009; 2013; 2017; 2022; 2025

Chile competed at the 2017 World Games in Wrocław, Poland, from July 20, 2017 to July 30, 2017.

Chilean delegation consisted of a total of 26 athletes, 22 men and 4 women, who competed in six sports.

Chile finished its participation with a total of four medals: one gold, one silver, and two bronze, placing them 31st in the medal table.

== Competitors ==
| Sports | Men | Women | Total | Events |
| Total | 0 | 0 | 0 | 0 |

== Medals ==
| Medal | Name | Sport | Event | Date |
|---|---|---|---|---|
| Gold | María Moya | Road speed skating | Women's 200 m time trial | |
| Silver | Rodrigo Miranda | Water skiing | Men's jump | |
| Bronze | Alejandra Traslaviña | Track speed skating | Women's 10000 m elimination | |
| Bronze | Lucas Silva | Track speed skating | Men's 500 m sprint | |

== Fistball ==
On 22 November 2015 Chile had qualified at the 2017 World Games in the Fistball Men Team event. On 29 November 2015 Chile has lost the quota.
