= Belgium at the 2017 World Games =

- IOC code: BEL
- NOC: Belgian Olympic Committee

in Wrocław, Poland 20 July 2017 – 30 July 2017
- Competitors: 40 in 12 sports

World Games appearances (overview)
- 1981; 1985; 1989; 1993; 1997; 2001; 2005; 2009; 2013; 2017; 2022; 2025

Belgium competed at the 2017 World Games in Wrocław, Poland, from July 20, 2017 to July 30, 2017.

== Competitors ==
Sports	Men	Women	Total	Events
Acrobatic Gymnastics	2	2	4	2
Archery	0	2	2	2
Billiards	1	0	1	1
Boules Sports	2	0	2	2
Ju-jitsu	6	2	8	7
Korfball	7	7	14	1
Orienteering	1	0	1	2
Roller Sports	1	2	3	14
Sport Climbing	0	1	1	1
Squash	0	1	1	1
Trampoline	0	1	1	1
Waterskiing	1	1	2	3
Total	21	19	40	36

== Gymnastic ==
=== Trampoline ===
Belgium has qualified at the 2017 World Games:

- Women's Individual Tumbling - 1 quota

== Ju-Jitsu ==
Belgium has qualified at the 2017 World Games:

- Men's Duo - 1 quota (Bjarne Lardon & Ben Cloostermans)

== Korfball ==
Belgium has qualified at the 2017 World Games in the Korfball Mixed Team event.
