= Chinese Taipei at the 2017 World Games =

Chinese Taipei at the World Games 2017
- IOC code: TPE
- NOC: Chinese Taipei Olympic Committee

in Wrocław, Poland 20 July 2017 – 30 July 2017
- Competitors: 67 in 14 sports
- Medals Ranked 28th: Gold 1 Silver 4 Bronze 3 Total 8

World Games appearances
- 1981; 1985; 1989; 1993; 1997; 2001; 2005; 2009; 2013; 2017; 2022; 2025

Chinese Taipei competed at the World Games 2017 in Wrocław, Poland, from 20 July 2017 to 30 July 2017. "Chinese Taipei" is the designated name used by Taiwan to participate in some international organizations and almost all sporting events.

== Competitors ==
Sports	Men	Women	Total	Events
Karate	0	1	1	2
Korfball	7	7	14	1
Tug of War	0	9	9	1
Total	7	16	25	4

== Karate ==
Chinese Taipei has qualified at the 2017 World Games:

- Women's -55 kg - 1 quota (Wen Tzu-yun)

She won the silver medal in her event.

== Korfball ==
Chinese Taipei has qualified at the 2017 World Games in the Korfball Mixed Team event.

== Tug of war ==
Chinese Taipei won the gold medal in the women's indoor 540 kg event.
