= Germany at the 2017 World Games =

- IOC code: GER
- NOC: German Olympic Committee

in Wrocław, Poland 20 July 2017 – 30 July 2017
- Competitors: 48 in 5 sports

World Games appearances
- 1981; 1985; 1989; 1993; 1997; 2001; 2005; 2009; 2013; 2017; 2022; 2025

Germany competed at the 2017 World Games in Wrocław, Poland, from July 20, 2017 to July 30, 2017.

== Competitors ==
Sports	Men	Women	Total	Events
American football	22	0	22	1
Fistball	9	0	9	1
Korfball	7	7	14	1
Rhythmic gymnastics	0	1	1	1
Sport climbing	1	1	2	2
Total	39	9	48	6

== American football ==
Germany has qualified at the 2017 World Games in the American football Men Team event.

== Fistball ==
Germany has qualified at the 2017 World Games in the Fistball Men Team event.

== Gymnastic ==
=== Rhythmic gymnastics ===
Germany has qualified at the 2017 World Games:

- Women's individual event - 1 quota

== Korfball ==
Germany has qualified at the 2017 World Games in the Korfball Mixed Team event.

== Sport climbing ==
Germany has qualified at the 2017 World Games:

- Men's Bouldering - Jan Hojer
- Women's Bouldering - Juliane Wurm

== Tug of war ==
Germany won the bronze medal in the men's outdoor 640 kg event.
