= Spain at the 2017 World Games =

- IOC code: ESP
- NOC: Spanish Olympic Committee

in Wrocław, Poland 20 July 2017 – 30 July 2017
- Competitors: 7 in 5 sports

World Games appearances
- 1981; 1985; 1989; 1993; 1997; 2001; 2005; 2009; 2013; 2017; 2022; 2025

Spain competed at the 2017 World Games in Wrocław, Poland, from July 20, 2017 to July, 30 2017.

== Competitors ==
Sports	Men	Women	Total	Events
Finswimming	0	1	1	1
Rhythmic gymnastics	0	1	1	1
Sport climbing	1	0	1	1
Trampoline	1	0	1	1
Karate	2	1	3	3
Total	4	3	7	7

== Beach handball ==
The women's team won the bronze medal in the women's tournament.

== Finswimming ==
Spain has qualified at the 2017 World Games with one female athlete, Silvia Barnés Corominas, who got the pass ending sixth in 50 mt bifins at World Finswimming Championship 2016, held in Volos, Greece.

== Gymnastic ==
=== Rhythmic gymnastics ===
Spain has qualified at the 2017 World Games:

- Women's individual event - 1 quota

=== Trampoline ===
Argentina has qualified at the 2017 World Games:

- Men's Individual Double Mini Trampoline - 1 quota

== Karate ==
- Men's Kata - 1 quota (Damián Hugo Quintero Capdevila)
- Men's Kumite -60 kg - 1 quota (Matías Gómez García)
- Women's Kata - 1 quota (Sandra Sánchez)

== Sport climbing ==
Spain has qualified at the 2017 World Games:

- Men's Lead - Ramon Julian Puigblanque
