= Colombia at the 2017 World Games =

- IOC code: COL
- NOC: Colombian Olympic Committee
- Website: www.olimpicocol.co (in Spanish)

World Games appearances
- 1981; 1985; 1989; 1993; 1997; 2001; 2005; 2009; 2013; 2017; 2022; 2025

Colombia competed at the 2017 World Games held in Wrocław, Poland.

== Archery ==
Sara López won the gold medal in the women's compound event.

== Bowling ==
Clara Guerrero and Rocio Restrepo won the gold medal in the women's doubles event.

Clara Guerrero won the silver medal in the women's singles event.
