= Ju-jitsu at the World Games =

Ju-Jitsu was introduced as a World Games sport at the 1997 World Games in Lahti.

== Fighting ==
=== Men ===
==== −62 kg ====
Games	Gold	Silver	Bronze
1997 Lahti	Jörn Meiners (GER)	Taco Morren (NED)	Jonatan Vega (ESP)
2013 Cali	Pavel Korzhavykh (RUS)	Farid Ben Ali (FRA)	Wilson Alzate Cortes (COL)
2017 Wrocław	Bohdan Mochulskyi (UKR)	Jairo Alejandro Viviescas Ortíz (COL)	Roman Apolonov (GER)
2022 Birmingham	Bohdan Mochulskyi (UKR)	Jairo Alejandro Viviescas Ortíz (COL)	Ecco van der Veer (NED)

==== −69 kg ====
Games	Gold	Silver	Bronze
2001 Akita	Antonio da Costa (FRA)	Gerhard Ableidinger (AUT)	Colin Kist (NED)
2005 Duisburg	Christian Mattle (DEN)	Ferry Hendriks (NED)	Marco Dünzel (GER)
2009 Kaohsiung	Julien Boussuge (FRA)	Mathias Brix Willard (DEN)	Fedor Serov (RUS)
2013 Cali	Mathias Brix Willard (DEN)	Dmitrii Beshenets (RUS)	Sebastien Marty (FRA)
2017 Wrocław	Boy Vogelzang (NED)	Pavel Korzhavykh (RUS)	Eduardo Alberto Gutiérrez Cortés (MEX)
2022 Birmingham	Jaschar Salmanow (GER)	Ivan Della Croce (SRB)	Tim Toplak (SLO)

==== −72 kg ====
Games	Gold	Silver	Bronze
1997 Lahti	Johan Blomdahl (SWE)	Marc Marie-Louise (FRA)	Michel van Rijt (NED)

==== −77 kg ====
Games	Gold	Silver	Bronze
2001 Akita	Didier Cezar (FRA)	Michel van Rijt (NED)	Christer Oquist (SWE)
2005 Duisburg	Kenneth Thiim Johansson (DEN)	Mario Staller (GER)	Julien Boussuge (FRA)
2009 Kaohsiung	Igor Rudnev (RUS)	Mario Staller (GER)	Percy Kunsa Bi Aku (FRA)
2013 Cali	Danny Mathiasen (DEN)	Ilya Borok (RUS)	Johan de Gier (NED)
2017 Wrocław	Ilia Borok (RUS)	Andreas Stefan Knebl (GER)	Fredrik Hans Axel Widgren (SWE)
2022 Birmingham	Simon Attenberger (GER)	Lucas Andersen (DEN)	Boy Vogelzang (NED)

==== −82 kg ====
Games	Gold	Silver	Bronze
1997 Lahti	Bertrand Amousson (FRA)	Richard Carneborn (SWE)	Ben Rietdijk (NED)

==== −85 kg ====
Games	Gold	Silver	Bronze
2001 Akita	Rob Haans (NED)	Thierry Grimaud (FRA)	Peter Bevc (SLO)
2005 Duisburg	Guillaume Piquet (FRA)	Markus Buchholz (GER)	David Amores (ESP)
2009 Kaohsiung	Andreas Kuhl (GER)	Dmitriy Nobolsin (RUS)	Matthias Gastgeb (AUT)
2013 Cali	Ivan Nastenko (UKR)	Masoud Jalil Vand (IRI)	Alexey Ivanov (RUS)
2017 Wrocław	Mikkel Brix Willard (DEN)	Denis Belov (RUS)	William Seth-Wenzel (SWE)
2022 Birmingham	Nikola Trajković (SRB)	Donny Donker (NED)	Daniel Zmeev (GER)

==== −92 kg ====
Games	Gold	Silver	Bronze
1997 Lahti	Jean Guacide (FRA)	Joachim Göhrmann (GER)	Zlato Rizvic (SLO)

==== −94 kg ====
Games	Gold	Silver	Bronze
2001 Akita	Kamal Temal (FRA)	Pedro García (ESP)	Grzegorz Zimolag (POL)
2005 Duisburg	Fernando Segovia (ESP)	Aleksey Veselovzorov (RUS)	Vincent Parisi (FRA)
2009 Kaohsiung	Rob Haans (NED)	Sergey Kunashov (RUS)	Vincent Parisi (FRA)
2013 Cali	Lazar Kuburovic (DEN)	Tomasz Szewczak (POL)	Mohsen Hamidiaghchay (IRI)
2017 Wrocław	Tomasz Szewczak (POL)	Mohsen Hamid Aghchay (IRI)	Benjamin Lah (SLO)

==== +92 kg ====
Games	Gold	Silver	Bronze
1997 Lahti	Marcello de Figueiredo (BRA)	Christophe Barthes (FRA)	Wilfred Derks (SLO)

==== +94 kg ====
Games	Gold	Silver	Bronze
2017 Wrocław	Alexandre Fromangé (FRA)	Rafał Riss (POL)	Dejan Vukčević (MNE)

=== Women ===
==== −48 kg ====
Games	Gold	Silver	Bronze
2022 Birmingham	Kanjutha Phattaraboonsorn (THA)	Athanasia Zariopi (GRE)	Sandra Badie (FRA)

==== −55 kg ====
Games	Gold	Silver	Bronze
2005 Duisburg	Jeanne Khan Rasmussen (DEN)	Minerva Montero (ESP)	Annabelle Reydy (FRA)
2009 Kaohsiung	Annabelle Reydy (FRA)	Li Chingtyi (TPE)	Aizhan Kukuzova (KAZ)
2013 Cali	Mandy Sonnemann (GER)	Martyna Bieronska (POL)	Anna Knutsen (NOR)
2017 Wrocław	Rebekka Elisabeth Ziska Dahl (DEN)	Laure Beauchet Ep Doucet (FRA)	Jessica Scricciolo (ITA)

==== −57 kg ====
Games	Gold	Silver	Bronze
2022 Birmingham	Licai Pourtois (BEL)	Christina Koutoulaki (GRE)	Rebekka Dahl (DEN)

==== −58 kg ====
Games	Gold	Silver	Bronze
1997 Lahti	Esther Oostlander (NED)	Anne Corvaisier (FRA)	Anna Dimberg (SWE)

==== −62 kg ====
Games	Gold	Silver	Bronze
2001 Akita	Patricia Hekkens (NED)	Jeanne Rasmussen (DEN)	Diana Gaslo Giménez (ESP)
2005 Duisburg	Nicole Sydbøge (DEN)	Judith de Weerd (NED)	Marisol-Claudia Harms (GER)
2009 Kaohsiung	Sabrina Hatzky (GER)	Yang Hsientzu (TPE)	Irene Baars (NED)
2013 Cali	Sara Widgren (SWE)	Séverine Nébié (FRA)	Carina Neupert (GER)
2017 Wrocław	Atio Severine Nebie (FRA)	Annalisa Cavarretta (ITA)	Carina Neupert (GER)

==== −63 kg ====
Games	Gold	Silver	Bronze
2022 Birmingham	Juliana Ferreira (FRA)	Orapa Senatham (THA)	Lilian Weiken (GER)

==== −68 kg ====
Games	Gold	Silver	Bronze
1997 Lahti	Petra Holzhausen (GER)	Anne Corvaisier (FRA)	Anna Dimberg (SWE)

==== −70 kg ====
Games	Gold	Silver	Bronze
2001 Akita	Nicole Sydbøge (DEN)	Sophie Albert (FRA)	Anna Dimberg (SWE)
2005 Duisburg	Sabine Felser (GER)	Aurora Fajardo (ESP)	Lindsay Wyatt (NED)
2009 Kaohsiung	Mélanie Lavis (FRA)	Lindsay Wyatt (NED)	Sonja Kinz (GER)
2013 Cali	Alexandra Ivanova (RUS)	Emilia Mackowiak (POL)	Manuela Lukas (GER)
2017 Wrocław	Theresa Attenberger (GER)	Chloé Lalande (FRA)	Aafke van Leeuwen (NED)
2022 Birmingham	Annalena Bauer (GER)	Chloé Lalande (FRA)	Liva Tanzer (DEN)

==== +68 kg ====
Games	Gold	Silver	Bronze
1997 Lahti	Laurence Sionneau (FRA)	Jenni Brolin (SWE)	Pia Larsen (DEN)

== Duo ==
=== Men ===
Games	Gold	Silver	Bronze
1997 Lahti	Netherlands (NED); Barry van Bommel; Marco Markus	France (FRA); Eric Candori; Stéphane Freshi	Sweden (SWE); Erik Nordstrm; Käre Nordström
2001 Akita	France (FRA); Bruno Pereira; Jérôme Laurent	Germany (GER); Andreas Richter; Raik Tietze	Belgium (BEL); Tom Jacobs; Wim Kersemans
2005 Duisburg	Switzerland (SUI); Remo Müller; Pascal Müller	Spain (ESP); Gil García; Alexandre Barrero	France (FRA); Laurent Beart; Julien Hellouin
2009 Kaohsiung	Switzerland (SUI); Remo Müller; Pascal Müller	Germany (GER); Richard Hohenacker; Juri Hatzenbühler	France (FRA); Aurélien Dubois; Jordane Dubois
2013 Cali	Germany (GER); Dries Beyer; Raphael Rochner	Netherlands (NED); Ruben Assman; Marnix Bunnik	Spain (ESP); Enrique Sanchez; Alberto Yague
2017 Wrocław	Austria (AUT); Nicolaus Bichler; Sebastian Vosta	Netherlands (NED); Ruben Assmann; Marnix Bunnik	Belgium (BEL); Ben Jos Cloostermans; Bjarne Lardon

=== Women ===
Games	Gold	Silver	Bronze
2001 Akita	Denmark (DEN); Vibeke Mortensen; Karina Lauridsen	France (FRA); Laetitia Deloris; Geraldine Dejardin	Netherlands (NED); Silvia Alvarez; Nuray Batman
2005 Duisburg	Germany (GER); Stephanie Satory; Nadin Altmüller	Austria (AUT); Katharina Beisteiner; Eva Ehrlich	Belgium (BEL); Sandy van Landeghem; Vanessa van de Vijver
2009 Kaohsiung	Austria (AUT); Maria Schreil; Marion Tremel	Italy (ITA); Sara Paganini; Linda Ragazzi	France (FRA); Patricia Floquet; Isabelle Bacon
2013 Cali	Austria (AUT); Mirneta Becirovic; Mirnesa Becirovic	Switzerland (SUI); Alexandra Erni; Antonia Erni	Sweden (SWE); Maria Eriksson; Malin Persson
2017 Wrocław	Austria (AUT); Mirnesa Becirovic; Mirneta Becirovic	Slovenia (SLO); Sara Besal; Patricija Delač	Germany (GER); Blanca Birn; Annalena Sturm

=== Mixed ===
Games	Gold	Silver	Bronze
1997 Lahti	France (FRA); Phi Minh-Minh Ngo; Antonio da Costa	Netherlands (NED); Jacqueline Latumahina; Barry van Bommel	Austria (AUT); Sabine Kampf; Ferdinand Fuhrmann
2001 Akita	Spain (ESP); Isabel Arroyo; Miguel Martínez	Germany (GER); Gertraud Christ; Peter Florian	Denmark (DEN); Camilla Prien; Frank Stjernholm
2005 Duisburg	Germany (GER); Corina Endele; Matthias Huber	Netherlands (NED); Silvia Alvarez; Barry van Bommel	Switzerland (SUI); Marianne Schilliger; Andreas Zürcher
2009 Kaohsiung	France (FRA); Aurore Bouhier Besoulle; Nicolas Perea	Switzerland (SUI); Joelle Kempf; David Wernli	Belgium (BEL); Wendy Driesen; Yazid Dalaa
2013 Cali	Germany (GER); Dominika Zagorski; Tom Ismer	Italy (ITA); Sara Paganini; Michele Vallieri	Netherlands (NED); Saskia Boomgaard; Ruben Assmann
2017 Wrocław	Italy (ITA); Sara Pagaanini; Michele Vallierei	Germany (GER); Julia Paszkiewicz; Johannes Tourbeslis	Belgium (BEL); Charis Jessy Gravensteyn; Ian Rudy Lodens
2022 Birmingham	Thailand (THA); Lalita Yuennan; Warawut Saengsriruang	Belgium (BEL); Charis Gravensteyn; Ian Lodens	Switzerland (SUI); Sofia Jokl; Thomas Schönenberger

== Ne-waza ==
=== Men ===
==== −62 kg ====
Games	Gold	Silver	Bronze
2017 Wrocław	Jędrzej Loska (POL)	Jairo Alejandro Viviescas Ortíz (COL)	João Carlos Hiroshi Kuraoka (JPN)

==== −69 kg ====
Games	Gold	Silver	Bronze
2017 Wrocław	Haidar Raza Abbas (FRA)	Maciej Polok (POL)	Evyatar Paperni (ISR)
2022 Birmingham	Florian Bayili (BEL)	Mohamed Al-Suwaidi (UAE)	Viki Dabush (ISR)

==== −77 kg ====
Games	Gold	Silver	Bronze
2017 Wrocław	Ilke Kubilay Bulut (SUI)	Wim Deputter (BEL)	Maciej Kozak (POL)
2022 Birmingham	Nimrod Ryeder (ISR)	Ali Munfaredi (BHR)	Michael Sheehan (CAN)

==== −85 kg ====
Games	Gold	Silver	Bronze
2013 Cali	Dan Schon (MEX)	Sebastien Lecocq (FRA)	Roy Pariente (ISR)
2017 Wrocław	Dan Schon (MEX)	Daniel de Maddalena (SUI)	Abdulbari Guseinov (RUS)
2022 Birmingham	Faisal Al-Ketbi (UAE)	Abdurahmanhaji Murtazaliev (KGZ)	Saar Shemesh (ISR)

==== −94 kg ====
Games	Gold	Silver	Bronze
2017 Wrocław	Faisal Al-Ketbi (UAE)	Kristóf Szűcs (HUN)	Florent Minguet (BEL)

==== +94 kg ====
Games	Gold	Silver	Bronze
2017 Wrocław	Seif-Eddine Houmine (MAR)	Frédéric Husson (FRA)	Aleksandr Sak (RUS)

==== Open ====
Games	Gold	Silver	Bronze
2017 Wrocław	Kristóf Szűcs (HUN)	Faisal Al-Ketbi (UAE)	Seif-Eddine Houmine (MAR)
2022 Birmingham	Faisal Al-Ketbi (UAE)	Seif-Eddine Houmine (MAR)	Saar Shemesh (ISR)

=== Women ===
==== −48 kg ====
Games	Gold	Silver	Bronze
2022 Birmingham	Vicky Hoang (CAN)	Kanjutha Phattaraboonsorn (THA)	Irina Brodski (GER)

==== −55 kg ====
Games	Gold	Silver	Bronze
2017 Wrocław	Amal Amjahid (BEL)	Bayarmaa Munkhgerel (MGL)	Ana Nair Marques Dias (POR)

==== −57 kg ====
Games	Gold	Silver	Bronze
2022 Birmingham	Meshy Rosenfeld (ISR)	Galina Duvanova (KAZ)	Laurence Fouillat (FRA)

==== −63 kg ====
Games	Gold	Silver	Bronze
2022 Birmingham	Maja Povšnar (SLO)	Rony Nisimian (ISR)	Shamma Al-Kalbani (UAE)

==== −70 kg ====
Games	Gold	Silver	Bronze
2013 Cali	Anna Polok (POL)	Olga Usoltseva (RUS)	Laura Boco (ITA)

==== Open ====
Games	Gold	Silver	Bronze
2017 Wrocław	Amal Amjahid (BEL)	Luma Hatem Sharif Alqubaj (JOR)	Emilia Maćkowiak (POL)
2022 Birmingham	Meshy Rosenfeld (ISR)	Bohdana Holub (UKR)	Shamma Al-Kalbani (UAE)

=== Mixed ===
==== Team competition ====
Games	Gold	Silver	Bronze
2017 Wrocław	Germany (GER); Roman Apolonov; Theresa Attenberger; Andreas Stefan Knebl; Malte Meinken; Carina Neupert; Julia Paszkiewicz; Johannes Tourbeslis; Tim Weidenbecher	Russia (RUS); Denis Belov; Ilia Borok; Abdulbari Guseinov; Pavel Korzhavykh; Olga Medvedeva; Zainutdin Zainukov	Poland (POL); Magdalena Giec; Maciej Kozak; Jędrzej Loska; Emilia Maćkowiak; Tomasz Szewczak; Marta Walotek
2022 Birmingham	France (FRA); Sandra Badie; Valentin Blumental; Juliana Ferreira; Laurence Fouillat; Percy Kunsa; Chloé Lalande; Julien Mathieu	Germany (GER); Simon Attenberger; Annalena Bauer; Irina Brodski; Julia Paszkiewicz; Jaschar Salmanow; Johannes Tourbeslis; Lilian Weiken; Daniel Zmeev	Netherlands (NED); Genevieve Bogers; Anne van der Brugge; Lidija Caković; Donny Donker; Aafke van Leeuwen; Ecco van der Veer; Boy Vogelzang; Stefan Vukotić
