= Fredrik Widgren =

Swedish martial artist

Personal information
- Full name: Fredrik Hans Axel Widgren
- Born: 4 June 1994 (age 32) Nacka, Sweden

Sport
- Sport: Fighting Ju-jitsu, Judo
- Weight class: -77 kg
- Club: Nacka Dojo
- Coached by: Ricard Carneborn; Rob Haans; Ingemar Sköld
Medal record
Men's sport ju-jitsu
Representing Sweden
World Games
Bronze medal – third place	2017 Wroclaw	Fighting −77 kg
World Combat Games
Silver medal – second place	2013 St. Petersburg	Fighting −77 kg
World Championships
Silver medal – second place	2012 Vienna	Fighting −77 kg
Bronze medal – third place	2014 Paris	Fighting −77 kg
Bronze medal – third place	2015 Bangkok	Fighting −77 kg
Bronze medal – third place	2016 Wroclaw	Fighting −77 kg
Bronze medal – third place	2018 Malmö	Fighting −77 kg
Gold medal – first place	2019 Abu Dhabi	Fighting −77 kg
European Championships
Silver medal – second place	2013 Walldorf	Fighting −77 kg
Bronze medal – third place	2015 Almere	Fighting −77 kg
Gold medal – first place	2017 Banja Luka	Fighting −77 kg
Gold medal – first place	2018 Gliwice	Fighting −77 kg
- Updated on 30 November 2019

Fredrik Widgren (born 4 June 1994) is a swedish martial artist who represents his native country Sweden in sport jujitsu (JJIF).

== Career ==
When he was 6 years he visited for first time fighting club in Nacka near Stockholm where his older Sara was already training sport jujitsu. He began training sport jujitsu at age of 8. He has been trained by famous swedish jutsuka Ricard Carneborn. He is member of swedish ju-jitsu team since 2011. In 2019 he won world title (JJIF) in Abu Dhabi in discipline Fighting System, category −77 kg.

== Results ==
World Games (IWGA + JJIF)
Year	Place	Medal	Discipline	Category
2017	Wrocław (Poland)	Bronze	Fighting System	−77 kg
World Combat Games (GAISF + JJIF)
2013	Saint Petersburg (Russia)	Silver	Fighting System	−77 kg
Ju-Jitsu World Championships (JJIF)
2012	Vienna (Austria)	Silver	Fighting System	−77 kg
2014	Paris (France)	Bronze	Fighting System	−77 kg
2015	Bangkok (Thailand)	Bronze	Fighting System	−77 kg
2016	Wrocław (Poland)	Bronze	Fighting System	−77 kg
2018	Malmö (Sweden)	Bronze	Fighting System	−77 kg
2019	Abu Dhabi (United Arab Emirates)	Gold	Fighting System	−77 kg
Ju-Jitsu European Championships (JJEU + JJIF)
2013	Walldorf (Germany)	Silver	Fighting System	−77 kg
2015	Almere (Netherlands)	Bronze	Fighting System	−77 kg
2017	Banja Luka (Bosnia and Herzegovina)	Gold	Fighting System	−77 kg
2018	Gliwice (Poland)	Gold	Fighting System	−77 kg
