= Ju-jitsu at the 2013 World Games =

- Venue: Evagelista Mora Coliseum
- Dates: July 29–30, 2013
- Competitors: 91 from 29 nations

The ju-jitsu competition at the 2013 World Games was held from July 29 to 30 at the Evagelista Mora Coliseum in Cali, Colombia. 91 athletes, from 29 nations, participated in the tournament.

== Participating nations ==
- Argentina (1)
- Austria (7)
- Azerbaijan (1)
- Belgium (2)
- Bolivia (1)
- Chile (2)
- Chinese Taipei (1)
- Colombia (5)
- Cuba (1)
- Denmark (4)
- France (6)
- Germany (9)
- Iran (2)
- Israel (1)
- Italy (5)
- Mauritius (1)
- Mexico (4)
- Montenegro (2)
- Netherlands (6)
- Norway (1)
- Poland (5)
- Russia (6)
- Slovenia (3)
- Spain (4)
- Sweden (5)
- Switzerland (2)
- Turkey (1)
- Ukraine (1)
- Uruguay (2)

== Medal table ==
Rank	Nation	Gold	Silver	Bronze	Total
1	Germany	3	0	2	5
2	Denmark	3	0	0	3
3	Russia	2	3	1	6
4	Poland	1	3	0	4
5	Sweden	1	0	1	2
6	Austria	1	0	0	1
6	Mexico	1	0	0	1
6	Ukraine	1	0	0	1
9	France	0	3	1	4
10	Netherlands	0	1	2	3
11	Iran	0	1	1	2
11	Italy	0	1	1	2
13	Switzerland	0	1	0	1
14	Colombia	0	0	1	1
14	Israel	0	0	1	1
14	Norway	0	0	1	1
14	Spain	0	0	1	1
Totals (17 entries)		13	13	13	39

== Events ==
=== Duo ===
Event	Gold	Silver	Bronze
Men	Germany; Dries Beyer; Raphael Rochner	Netherlands; Ruben Assmann; Marnix Bunnik	Spain; Enrique Sánchez; Alberto Yagüe
Women	Austria; Mirnesa Bećirović; Mirneta Bećirović	Switzerland; Alexandra Erni; Antonia Erni	Sweden; Maria Eriksson; Malin Persson
Mixed	Germany; Tom Ismer; Dominika Zagorski	Italy; Michele Vallieri; Sara Paganini	Netherlands; Ruben Assmann; Saskia Boomgaard

=== Men's fighting ===
Event	Gold	Silver	Bronze
−62 kg	Pavel Korzhavykh; Russia	Farid Ben Ali; France	Wilson Álzate; Colombia
−69 kg	Mathias Willard; Denmark	Dmitry Beshenets; Russia	Sébastien Marty; France
−77 kg	Danny Mathiasen; Denmark	Ilya Borok; Russia	Johan de Gier; Netherlands
−85 kg	Ivan Nastenko; Ukraine	Masoud Jalilvand; Iran	Aleksey Ivanov; Russia
−94 kg	Lazar Kuburović; Denmark	Tomasz Szewczak; Poland	Mohsen Hamidi; Iran

=== Men's ne-waza ===
Event	Gold	Silver	Bronze
−85 kg	Dan Schon; Mexico	Sébastien Lecocq; France	Roy Pariente; Israel

=== Women's fighting ===
Event	Gold	Silver	Bronze
−55 kg	Mandy Sonnemann; Germany	Martyna Bierońska; Poland	Anna Knutsen; Norway
−62 kg	Sara Widgren; Sweden	Séverine Nébié; France	Carina Neupert; Germany
−70 kg	Aleksandra Ivanova; Russia	Emilia Maćkowiak; Poland	Manuela Lukas; Germany

=== Women's ne-waza ===
Event	Gold	Silver	Bronze
−70 kg	Anna Polok; Poland	Olga Usoltseva; Russia	Laura Boco; Italy
