= 2008 Ju-Jitsu World Championships =

- Host city: Malmö, Sweden
- Dates: 28–30 November
- Main venue: Baltiska Hallen

The 2008 Ju-Jitsu World Championship were the 8th edition of the Ju-Jitsu World Championships, and were held in Malmö, Sweden from November 28 to November 30, 2008.

== Schedule ==
- 28.11.2008 – Men's and Women's Fighting System, Men's Duo System – Classic
- 29.11.2008 – Men's and Women's Fighting System, Women's Duo System – Classic
- 30.11.2008 – Men's and Women's Fighting System, Mixed Duo System – Classic

== European Ju-Jitsu ==
=== Fighting System ===
==== Men's events ====
| Category | Gold | Silver | Bronze | |
|---|---|---|---|---|
| –62 kg | Pavel Korzhavykh (RUS) | Javier García (ESP) | Anders Lauridsen (DEN) | Zlatko Tsvetkov (BUL) |
| –69 kg | Julien Boussuge (FRA) | Mathias Willard (DEN) | Alexander Reichert (GER) | Fedor Serov (RUS) |
| –77 kg | Mario Staller (GER) | Nurlan Tleumbetov (KAZ) | Tomasz Krajewski (POL) | Johan Ingholt (SWE) |
| –85 kg | Andreas Kuhl (GER) | Dmitry Nebolsin (RUS) | Willy Dupont (BEL) | Franck Vatan (FRA) |
| –94 kg | Vedran Ikić (CRO) | Vincent Parisi (FRA) | Tomasz Szewczak (POL) | Leonid Rubtsov (UKR) |
| +94 kg | Rob Haans (NED) | Carlo Clemens (GER) | Ville Ilola (SWE) | Frédéric Husson (FRA) |

==== Women's events ====
| Category | Gold | Silver | Bronze | |
|---|---|---|---|---|
| –55 kg | Linda Lindström (SWE) | Martyna Bierońska (POL) | Olga Pastushenko (RUS) | Corina Cekada (AUT) |
| –62 kg | Mirjana Martinović (MNE) | Heleen Baars (NED) | Jessica Tanzilli (SWE) | Isabelle Bacon (FRA) |
| –70 kg | Mélanie Lavis (FRA) | Lindsay Wyatt (NED) | Laura Boco (ITA) | Jeanne Rasmussen (DEN) |
| +70 kg | Taja Lüthje (DEN) | Seher Dumanli (GER) | Alla Paderina (RUS) | Marzena Makula (POL) |

=== Duo System ===
==== Duo Classic events ====
| Category | Gold | Silver | Bronze | |
|---|---|---|---|---|
| men | Pascal Müller (SUI); Remo Müller (SUI) | Martin Kornfeld (AUT); Reinhard Tlustos (AUT) | Ruben Assmann (NED); Samir Ouladlaali (NED) | Michele Vallieri (ITA); Vito Zaccaria (ITA) |
| women | Alexandra Erni (SUI); Antonia Erni (SUI) | Axelle Brouet (FRA); Gaelle Soustre (FRA) | Sara Paganini (ITA); Linda Ragazzi (ITA) | Maria Schreil (AUT); Marion Tremel (AUT) |
| mixed | Jesper Kedjevåg (SWE); Liza Karlsson (SWE) | Yazid Dalaa (BEL); Wendy Driesen (BEL) | Marcus Haider (AUT); Vera Bichler (AUT) | Nicolas Perea (FRA); Aurore Perea (FRA) |
