= Dmitry Beshenets =

Russian martial artist

Personal information
- Native name: Дмитрий Александрович Бешенец
- Full name: Dmitry Aleksandrovich Beshenets
- National team: Russia
- Born: 25 April 1984 (age 42) Voronezh Oblast, Russia

Sport
- Sport: Fighting Ju-jitsu, Sambo, Judo
- Weight class: 69 kg
- Club: FDDMO (ФДДМО)
- Coached by: Ivan Dolbilin (personal coach); D. Ivanov; Ye. Korotkykh
Medal record
Men's sport ju-jitsu
Representing Russia
World Games
Silver medal – second place	2013 Cali	Fighting −69 kg
World Combat Games
Gold medal – first place	2013 St. Petersburg	Fighting −69 kg
World Championships
Gold medal – first place	2010 St. Petersburg	Fighting −69 kg
Gold medal – first place	2011 Cali	Fighting −69 kg
Gold medal – first place	2012 Vienna	Fighting −69 kg
Silver medal – second place	2015 Bangkok	Fighting −69 kg
Bronze medal – third place	2016 Wroclaw	Fighting −69 kg
Gold medal – first place	2017 Bogota	Fighting −69 kg
Gold medal – first place	2018 Malmö	Fighting −69 kg
Silver medal – second place	2019 Abu Dhabi	Fighting −69 kg
European Championships
Gold medal – first place	2009 Podgorica	Fighting −69 kg
Gold medal – first place	2011 Maribor	Fighting −69 kg
Gold medal – first place	2013 Walldorf	Fighting −69 kg
Gold medal – first place	2015 Almere	Fighting −69 kg
Silver medal – second place	2017 Banja Luka	Fighting −69 kg
Gold medal – first place	2018 Gliwice	Fighting −69 kg
Gold medal – first place	2019 Bucharest	Fighting −69 kg
- Updated on 30 November 2019

Dmitry Aleksandrovich Beshenets (Russian: Дмитрий Александрович Бешенец, born 25 April 1984) is a Russian martial artist who represents his native country Russia in sport jujitsu (JJIF).

== Career ==
As a child he began with sambo and judo in Voronezh under the coach Ivan Dolbilin. He switched for sport jujitsu with his coach after 2004 when it became supported sport in Russia. He is member of Russian national team since 2008 and since that he was affiliated with city Saint Petersburg. In 2014 he was banned by national federation for 1 year for signing with Moscow Oblast without permission.

In international level he is one of the most successful jutsuka. He is seven times individual world champion – 2010, 2011, 2012, 2017, 2018 and six times European champion in discipline fighting system, 69 kg weight category.

=== Results ===
World Games (IWGA + JJIF)
Year	Place	Medal	Discipline	Category
2013	Cali, Colombia	Silver	Fighting System	-69 kg
World Combat Games (GAISF + JJIF)
2013	Saint Petersburg, Russia	Gold	Fighting System	-69 kg
Ju-Jitsu World Championships (JJIF)
2010	Saint Petersburg, Russia	Gold	Fighting System	-69 kg
2011	Cali, Colombia	Gold	Fighting System	-69 kg
2012	Vienna, Austria	Gold	Fighting System	-69 kg
2015	Bangkok, Thailand	Silver	Fighting System	-69 kg
2016	Wrocław, Poland	Bronze	Fighting System	-69 kg
2017	Bogotá, Colombia	Gold	Fighting System	-69 kg
2018	Malmö, Sweden	Gold	Fighting System	-69 kg
2019	Abu Dhabi, United Arab Emirates	Silver	Fighting System	-69 kg
Ju-Jitsu European Championships (JJEU + JJIF)
2009	Podgorica, Montenegro	Gold	Fighting System	-69 kg
2011	Maribor, Slovenia	Gold	Fighting System	-69 kg
2013	Walldorf, Germany	Gold	Fighting System	-69 kg
2015	Almere, Netherlands	Gold	Fighting System	-69 kg
2017	Banja Luka, Bosnia and Herzegovina	Silver	Fighting System	-69 kg
2018	Gliwice, Poland	Gold	Fighting System	-69 kg
2018	Bucharest, Romania	Gold	Fighting System	-69 kg
