= 2010 Ju-Jitsu World Championships =

- Host city: Saint Petersburg, Russia
- Dates: 27–28 November
- Main venue: Yubileyny Sports Palace

The 2010 Ju-Jitsu World Championship were the 9th edition of the Ju-Jitsu World Championships, and were held in Saint Petersburg, Russia from November 27 to November 28, 2010.

== Schedule ==
- 27.11.2010 – Men's and Women's Fighting System, Men's and Women's Duo System – Classic
- 28.11.2010 – Men's and Women's Fighting System, Mixed Duo System – Classic

== European Ju-Jitsu ==
=== Fighting System ===
==== Men's events ====
Category	Gold	Silver	Bronze	
–62 kg	Pavel Korzhavykh (RUS)	Oliver Haider (AUT)	André Hürlimann (SUI)	Zlatko Tsvetkov (BUL)
–69 kg	Dmitry Beshenets (RUS)	Mathias Willard (DEN)	Marek Kręcielewski (POL)	Sébastien Marty (FRA)
–77 kg	Mario Staller (GER)	Igor Rudnev (RUS)	Danny Mathiasen (DEN)	Percy Kunsa (FRA)
–85 kg	Tomasz Krajewski (POL)	Masoud Jalilvand (IRI)	Clifton Struiken (NED)	Franck Vatan (FRA)
–94 kg	Sergey Kunashov (RUS)	Mohsen Hamidi (IRI)	Benjamin Lah (SLO)	Tomasz Szewczak (POL)
+94 kg	Yegor Stepanov (RUS)	Carlo Clemens (GER)	Frédéric Husson (FRA)	Gertjan Hofland (NED)

==== Women's events ====
Category	Gold	Silver	Bronze	
–55 kg	Mandy Sonnemann (GER)	Martyna Bierońska (POL)	Lee Ching-yi (TPE)	Anastasia Tonelli (ITA)
–62 kg	Heleen Baars (NED)	Tamara Strnad (SLO)	Carina Neupert (GER)	Séverine Nébié (FRA)
–70 kg	Aleksandra Ivanova (RUS)	Jeanne Rasmussen (DEN)	Marielle Pruvost (FRA)	Manuela Lukas (GER)
+70 kg	Alla Paderina (RUS)	Sabina Predovnik (SLO)	Iris Oppelt (GER)	Albertine Los (NED)

=== Duo System ===
==== Duo Classic events ====
Category	Gold	Silver	Bronze	
men	Peter Rigert (SUI); André Schwery (SUI)	Enrique Sánchez (ESP); Alberto Yagüe (ESP)	Ruben Assmann (NED); Johan de Gier (NED)	Dries Beyer (GER); Raphael Rochner (GER)
women	Alexandra Erni (SUI); Antonia Erni (SUI)	Isabelle Bacon (FRA); Patricia Floquet (FRA)	Mirnesa Bećirović (AUT); Mirneta Bećirović (AUT)	Genoveva Galan (ROU); Cătălina Mihalache (ROU)
mixed	Ruben Assmann (NED); Aarti Baran (NED)	Yazid Dalaa (BEL); Wendy Driesen (BEL)	Michele Vallieri (ITA); Sara Paganini (ITA)	Nicolas Perea (FRA); Aurore Perea (FRA)
