= Ju-jitsu at the 2013 World Games – Men's fighting 94 kg =

Men's fighting 94 kg at the 2013 World Games
- Venue: Evagelista Mora Coliseum
- Date: 30 July 2013
- Competitors: 6 from 6 nations

Medalists
1st place, gold medalist(s)		(Denmark) Lazar Kuburović
2nd place, silver medalist(s)		(Poland) Tomasz Szewczak
3rd place, bronze medalist(s)		(Iran) Mohsen Hamidi Aghchay

The men's fighting 94 kg competition in ju-jitsu at the 2013 World Games took place on 30 July 2013 at the Evagelista Mora Coliseum in Cali, Colombia.

== Results ==
=== Elimination round ===
==== Group A ====
Rank	Athlete	B	W	L	Pts	Score
1	Lazar Kuburović (DEN)	2	2	0	64–0	+64
2	Tomasz Szewczak (POL)	2	1	1	50–14	+36
3	Denis Douce (MRI)	2	0	2	0–100	–100

	Score	
Lazar Kuburović (DEN)	50–0	Denis Douce (MRI)
Lazar Kuburović (DEN)	14–0	Tomasz Szewczak (POL)
Denis Douce (MRI)	0–50	Tomasz Szewczak (POL)

==== Group B ====
Rank	Athlete	B	W	L	Pts	Score
1	Mohsen Hamidi Aghchay (IRI)	2	2	0	100–0	+100
2	Benjamin Lah (SLO)	2	1	1	13–55	–42
3	Maximo Arias (CHI)	2	0	2	5–63	–58

	Score	
Benjamin Lah (SLO)	0–50	Mohsen Hamidi Aghchay (IRI)
Benjamin Lah (SLO)	13–5	Maximo Arias (CHI)
Mohsen Hamidi Aghchay (IRI)	50–0	Maximo Arias (CHI)

=== Finals ===
Semifinals
Lazar Kuburović (DEN)	16
Benjamin Lah (SLO)	7
Mohsen Hamidi Aghchay (IRI)	4
Tomasz Szewczak (POL)	6

Final
Lazar Kuburović (DEN)	4
Tomasz Szewczak (POL)	3
Third place
Benjamin Lah (SLO)	4
Mohsen Hamidi Aghchay (IRI)	13
