= Pavel Korzhavykh =

Russian martial artist

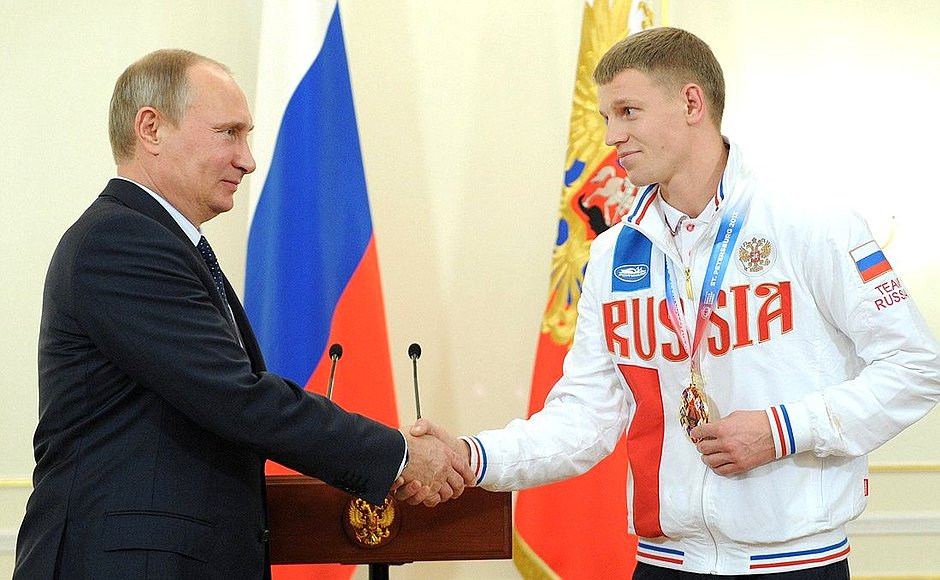
- Vladimir Putin and Pavel Korzhavykh in 2013
- Born: Pavel Vyacheslavovich Korzhavykh; September 6, 1987 (age 39); Polyany, Leningrad Oblast, Russia
- Native name: Павел Вячеславович Коржавых
- Nationality: Russian
- Division: 62 kg and 69 kg
- Style: Fighting Ju-jitsu; Sambo, Judo
- Trainer: Vladimir Podsitkov (first coach); Alla Paderina; Margarita Igorevna Malikova

Other information
- Notable club: KSHVSM (КШВСМ)
- Last updated on: 30 November 2019

Pavel Vyacheslavovich Korzhavykh (Russian: Павел Вячеславович Коржавых, born 6 September 1987) is a Russian martial artist who represents his native country Russia in sport jujitsu (JJIF).

== Career ==
At age 10 he began sambo and judo in his native village Polyany in Vyborgsky District under the coach Vladimir Podsitkov. He began sport jujitsu during his studying at Saint Petersburg Mining University about 2005 and soon became a member of the young Russian ju-jitsu team.

He was the winner of World Games in Cali from 2013 and is a six-time individual world champion – 2008, 2010, 2011, 2014, 2015, and 2016 in discipline fighting system, 62 kg and 69 kg weight category.

=== Results ===
World Games (IWGA + JJIF)
Year	Place	Medal	Discipline	Category
2013	Cali (Colombia)	Gold	Fighting System	-62 kg
2017	Wrocław (Poland)	Silver	Fighting System	-69 kg
World Combat Games (GAISF + JJIF)
2010	Beijing (China)	Gold	Fighting System	-62 kg
2013	Saint Petersburg (Russia)	Gold	Fighting System	-62 kg
Ju-Jitsu World Championships (JJIF)
2008	Malmö (Sweden)	Gold	Fighting System	-62 kg
2010	Saint Petersburg (Russia)	Gold	Fighting System	-62 kg
2011	Cali (Colombia)	Gold	Fighting System	-62 kg
2012	Vienna (Austria)	Bronze	Fighting System	-62 kg
2014	Paris (France)	Gold	Fighting System	-69 kg
2015	Bangkok (Thailand)	Gold	Fighting System	-69 kg
2016	Wrocław (Poland)	Gold	Fighting System	-69 kg
Ju-Jitsu European Championships (JJEU + JJIF)
2013	Walldorf (Germany)	Gold	Fighting System	-62 kg
2015	Almere (Netherlands)	Silver	Fighting System	-69 kg
