= 2015 Ju-Jitsu World Championships =

- Host city: Bangkok, Thailand
- Dates: 20–22 November
- Main venue: Gymnasium 5 – Thammasat University Rangsit Campus

The 2015 Ju-Jitsu World Championship were the 13th edition of the Ju-Jitsu World Championships, and were held in Bangkok, Thailand from November 20 to November 22, 2015.

== Schedule ==
- 20.11.2015 – Men's and Women's Fighting System, Men's Jiu-Jitsu (ne-waza), Women's Duo System – Classic, Mixed Duo System – Show
- 21.11.2015 – Men's and Women's Fighting System, Men's Jiu-Jitsu (ne-waza), Men's Duo System – Classic, Women's Duo System – Show
- 22.11.2015 – Women's Jiu-Jitsu (ne-waza), Men's Duo System – Show, Mixed Duo System – Classic, Team event

== European Ju-Jitsu ==
=== Fighting System ===
==== Men's events ====
Category	Gold	Silver	Bronze	
–56 kg	Jeison Mora (COL)	Felipe Iglesias (ESP)	Dylan Touati (FRA)	Abubakir Janibek (KAZ)
–62 kg	Roman Apolonov (GER)	Yazid Dalaa (BEL)	Vladimir Blokhin (RUS)	Bohdan Mochulskyy (UKR)
–69 kg	Pavel Korzhavykh (RUS)	Dmitry Beshenets (RUS)	Michael Garnier (FRA)	Boy Vogelzang (NED)
–77 kg	Percy Kunsa (FRA)	Ilya Borok (RUS)	Sébastien Marty (FRA)	Fredrik Widgren (SWE)
–85 kg	Mikkel Willard (DEN)	Denis Belov (RUS)	William Seth-Wenzel (SWE)	Ivan Nastenko (UKR)
–94 kg	Melvin Schol (NED)	Tim Weidenbecher (GER)	Dmitry Marchenko (RUS)	Tomasz Szewczak (POL)
+94 kg	Dejan Vukčević (MNE)	Alexandre Fromangé (FRA)	Rafał Riss (POL)	Mikhail Smirnov (RUS)

==== Women's events ====
Category	Gold	Silver	Bronze	
–49 kg	Agnieszka Karkosz (POL)	Anastasia Tonelli (ITA)	Andrea Plefka (GER)	Magdalena Giec (POL)
–55 kg	Martyna Bierońska (POL)	Laure Beauchet (FRA)	Jessica Scricciolo (ITA)	Rebekka Dahl (DEN)
–62 kg	Séverine Nébié (FRA)	Juliana Ferreira (FRA)	Olga Medvedeva (RUS)	Mandy Sonnemann (GER)
–70 kg	Aafke van Leeuwen (NED)	Cynthia Schellingerhout (NED)	Emilia Maćkowiak (POL)	Annalena Bauer (GER)
+70 kg	Éva Bisséni (FRA)	Charella Westra (NED)	Justyna Sitko (POL)	Bianca Feichtlbauer (AUT)

=== Duo System ===
==== Duo Classic events ====
Category	Gold	Silver	Bronze	
men	Nikolaus Bichler (AUT); Sebastian Vosta (AUT)	Ben Cloostermans (BEL); Bjarne Lardon (BEL)	Michael Kunz (GER); Manuel Spindel (GER)	Ruben Assmann (NED); Marnix Bunnik (NED)
women	Mirnesa Bećirović (AUT); Mirneta Bećirović (AUT)	Jasmin Ittensohn (GER); Tanja Ittensohn (GER)	Saowanee Limpanayingyong (THA); Wassanaporn Samthong (THA)	
mixed	Philippe Bleyer (AUT); Andrea Gruber (AUT)	Michele Vallieri (ITA); Sara Paganini (ITA)	Florian Petritsch (SUI); Antonia Erni (SUI)	Johannes Tourbeslis (GER); Julia Paszkiewicz (GER)

==== Duo Show events ====
Category	Gold	Silver	Bronze	
men	Dominique Beovardi (FRA); Jean-Jacques Beovardi (FRA)	Muhammad Ammar (PAK); Abu Huraira (PAK)	Jirayu Vongsawan (THA); Jirayut Wuttiwannapong (THA)	Nikolaus Bichler (AUT); Sebastian Vosta (AUT)
women	Mirnesa Bećirović (AUT); Mirneta Bećirović (AUT)	Jasmin Ittensohn (GER); Tanja Ittensohn (GER)	Suphawadee Kaeosrasaen (THA); Kunsatri Kumsroi (THA)	
mixed	Santiago Carrasco (ESP); María Merino (ESP)	Ronnie Stålebring (SWE); Malin Persson (SWE)	Stefan Vukotić (MNE); Lidija Jokić (MNE)	Thomas Schönenberger (SUI); Sofia Jokl (SUI)

== Brazilian Jiu-Jitsu ==
=== Men's events ===
Category	Gold	Silver	Bronze	
–62 kg	Jędrzej Loska (POL)	Hiroshi Kuraoka (JPN)	Ron Cohen (ISR)	Mihai Handrea (ROU)
–69 kg	Maciej Polok (POL)	Evyatar Paperni (ISR)	Haidar Abbas (FRA)	Daud Adayev (RUS)
–77 kg	Maciej Kozak (POL)	Wim Deputter (BEL)	Alan Ciku (BEL)	Tomasz Grieger (POL)
–85 kg	Dan Schon (MEX)	Khalfan Balhul (UAE)	Paweł Bańczyk (POL)	Nellys Tonco (FRA)
–94 kg	Faisal Al-Ketbi (UAE)	Zayed Al-Kaabi (UAE)	Florent Minguet (BEL)	Kristóf Szűcs (HUN)
+94 kg	Camil Moldoveanu (ROU)	Frédéric Husson (FRA)	Mehmet Eren Şimşek (TUR)	Seif-Eddine Houmine (MAR)

=== Women's events ===
Category	Gold	Silver	Bronze	
–55 kg	Helena Edfeldt (SWE)	Irina Kuprina (RUS)	Mönkhgerelyn Bayarmaa (MGL)	Martyna Bierońska (POL)
–62 kg	Amal Amjahid (BEL)	Adèle Bazile (FRA)	Fran Vanderstukken (BEL)	Clara Dufau (FRA)
–70 kg	Zafeiria Panagiotarakos (GRE)	Diana Halldén (SWE)	Tsogt-Ochiryn Battsetseg (MGL)	Irena Preiss (POL)
+70 kg	Lama Alqubaj (JOR)	Claire-France Thévenon (FRA)	Nguyễn Thị Lan (VIE)	Justyna Sitko (POL)

== Team event ==
Category	Gold	Silver	Bronze	
mixed teams	Russia	France	Netherlands	Germany
