= Amal Amjahid =

Belgian ground grappler

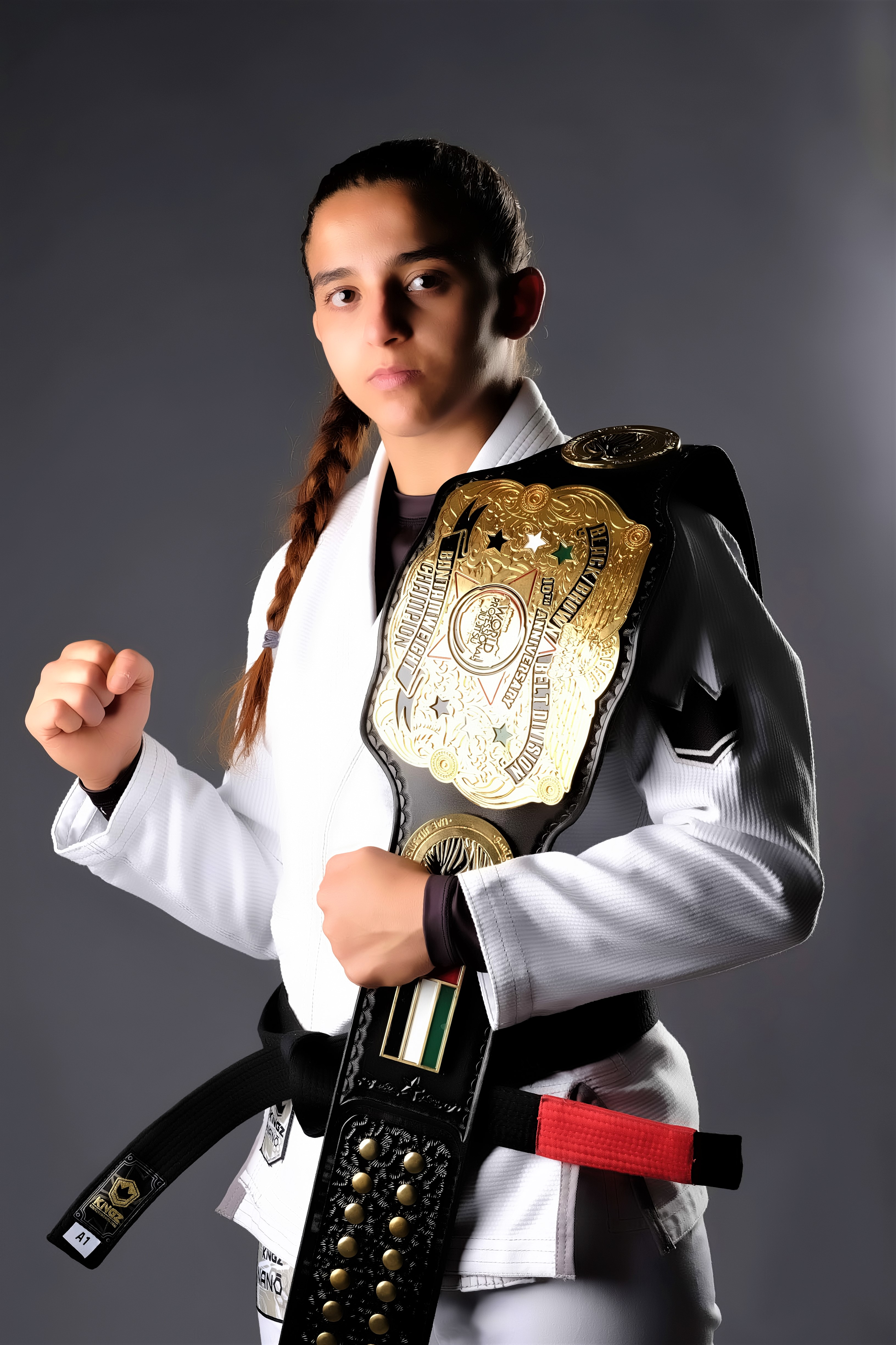

Personal information
- Native name: أمل مجاهد
- National team: Belgium
- Born: 28 October 1995 (age 30) Berchem-Sainte-Agathe, Belgium

Sport
- Sport: Brazilian Jiu-Jitsu (Ne-waza)
- Weight class: -55 kg, −57 kg, −63 kg, −70 kg
- Club: CENS Academy
- Team: Pat Academy BJJ
- Coached by: Khalid Houry
Medal record
Women's sport ju-jitsu
Representing Belgium
World Games
Gold medal – first place	2017 Wroclaw	Ne-waza −55 kg
Gold medal – first place	2017 Wroclaw	Ne-waza open
World Championships
Silver medal – second place	2014 Paris	Ne-waza −63 kg
Gold medal – first place	2015 Bangkok	Ne-waza −63 kg
Gold medal – first place	2016 Wroclaw	Ne-waza −55 kg
Gold medal – first place	2017 Bogota	Ne-waza −70 kg
Gold medal – first place	2018 Malmö	Ne-waza −55 kg
Gold medal – first place	2019 Abu Dhabi	Ne-waza −57 kg
European Championships
Gold medal – first place	2015 Almere	Ne-waza −63 kg
Gold medal – first place	2018 Gliwice	Ne-waza −70 kg
Gold medal – first place	2019 Bucharest	Ne-waza −70 kg
- Updated on 30 November 2019

Amal Amjahid (Arabic: أمل مجاهد, born 28 October 1995) is a Belgian ground grappler who represents her home country Belgium in Sport Jujitsu (JJIF), discipline Ne-waza and different professional teams (fighting clubs) in Brazilian Jiu-Jitsu (IBJJF, UAEJJF).

== Career ==
She began with sport jujitsu at age of 7 in Brussels. After initially trying karate, judo, taekwondo, and boxing, which “did not help her against larger opponents” at school. Two months after her first BJJ class, she began competing in both girls’ and boys’ divisions, sometimes having “8–9 matches per tournament” even as a child.

At age 11 (in 2006), Amal completed a rigorous two-year preparatory bicycle tour of approximately 3 200 km from Belgium to Morocco—cycling 50 km daily to school and training sessions—as part of a family challenge under her coach's guidance.

Her family is originally from Morocco. She is practising ground variant of ju-jitsu – Brazilian Jiu-Jitsu at CENS Academy under supervision of her personal coach and stepfather Khalid Houry. She is winner of World Games in Wrocław from 2017 and five times individual world champion (JJIF) – 2015, 2016, 2017, 2018, 2019 in discipline Ne-waza (Brazilian Jiu-Jitsu).

She is also participate at pro level tournaments which many times use title World (European) Championships but are regulated by private profite sport bodies – IBJJF or UAEJJF. She gained black belt in 2019. As black belt she is winner of European IBJJF Jiu-Jitsu Championship in 2019 as member of pro team Pat Academy BJJ.

== Black belt career ==
Amjahid was promoted to black belt by her coach (and future stepfather) Khalid Houry on June 30, 2018.

In early 2019, she claimed her first major black-belt title by winning the European IBJJF Open featherweight, and in 2020 secured her second European black-belt gold.

She holds a competitive 2–2 record with Amanda Monteiro in brown/black matches and earned a submission victory over Monteiro in the 2018 Abu Dhabi Pro final—a rare mixed brown/black division.

Unfortunately, immigration issues in the USA (June 2018) disqualified her coach from entry, forcing Amal to withdraw from the 2018 IBJJF World Championship as a brown belt, stating that competing without him was “unthinkable”.

She continues to compete actively in both **IBJJF and UAEJJF** circuits, including Grand Slam events and the World Pro, with notable recent activity.

=== Results ===
World Games (IWGA + JJIF)
Year	Place	Medal	Discipline	Category
2017	Wrocław, Poland	Gold	Ne-waza	−55 kg
2017	Wrocław, Poland	Gold	Ne-waza	open
Ju-Jitsu World Championships (JJIF)
2014	Paris, France	Silver	Ne-waza	−63 kg
2015	Bangkok, Thailand	Gold	Ne-waza	−63 kg
2016	Wrocław, Poland	Gold	Ne-waza	−55 kg
2017	Bogotá, Colombia	Gold	Ne-waza	−70 kg
2018	Malmö, Sweden	Gold	Ne-waza	−55 kg
2019	Abu Dhabi, United Arab Emirates	Gold	Ne-waza	−57 kg
Ju-Jitsu European Championships (JJEU + JJIF)
2015	Almere, Netherlands	Gold	Ne-waza	−63 kg
2018	Gliwice, Poland	Gold	Ne-waza	−70 kg
2019	Bucharest, Romania	Gold	Ne-waza	

== See also ==
- Jessa Khan
- Melissa Cueto
