= Faisal Al-Ketbi =

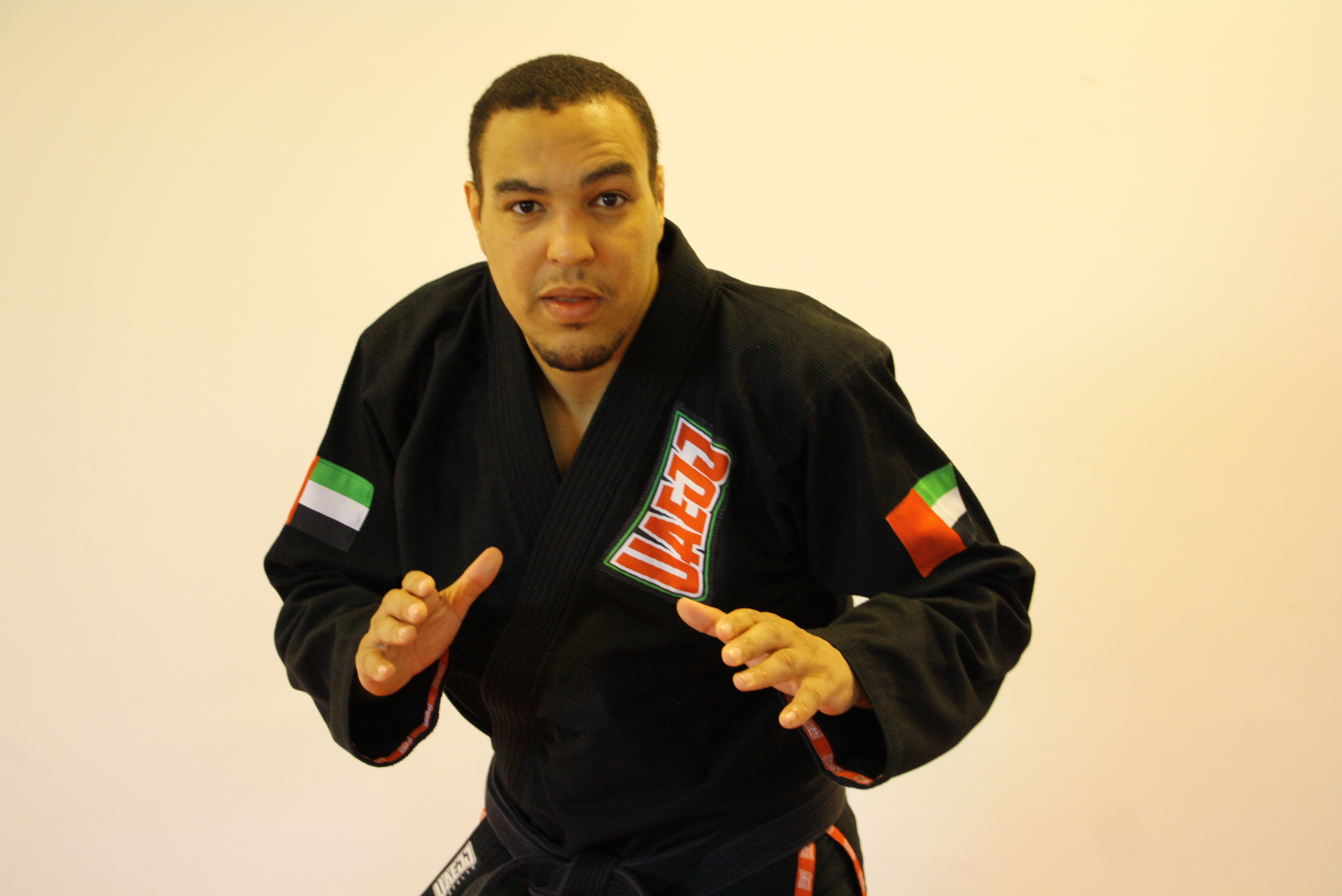
- Born: Faisal Fahad Al-Ketbi; 15 October 1987 (age 39); Abu Dhabi, United Arab Emirates
- Native name: فيصل فهد الكتبي
- Nationality: United Arab Emirates
- Division: -94 kg
- Style: Brazilian jiu-jitsu (Ne-waza); Freestyle wrestling
- Team: UAE Jiu Jitsu
- Trainer: Alex Paz (BJJ); Maiky Reiter (BJJ)
- Last updated on: 30 November 2019

Faisal Fahad Al-Ketbi (Arabic: فيصل فهد الكتبي, born 15 October 1987) is an Emirati wrestler and grappler who represents his native country United Arab Emirates at sport jujitsu (JJIF) and previously in olympic freestyle wrestling.

== Career ==
He began combat sports at the age of ten in his hometown of Abu Dhabi and soon he specialized in olympic freestyle wrestling. He participated at 2010 Asian Games but he has never reached the top level in freestyle wrestling. Around 2010 he switch the sport for Brazilian jiu-jitsu which is very popular in his homecountry United Arab Emirates. He was trained by Alex Paz and Maiky Reiter and in 2014 he was awarded his black belt in BJJ. He is five-time world champion in Ne-waza/BJJ under sports governing body JJIF.

He also participates at pro level tournaments which many times use title World Championships but are regulated by private sport bodies – UAEJJF and IBJJF.

=== Results ===
World Games (IWGA + JJIF)
Year	Place	Medal	Category
2017	Wrocław, Poland	Gold	−94 kg
Ju-Jitsu World Championships (JJIF)
2015	Bangkok, Thailand	Gold	−94 kg
2016	Wrocław, Poland	Gold	−94 kg
2017	Bogotá, Colombia	Gold	−94 kg
2019	Abu Dhabi, United Arab Emirates	Gold	−94 kg
