= 2012 Ju-Jitsu World Championships =

2012 Ju-Jitsu world tournament held in Vienna, Austria

- Host city: Vienna, Austria
- Dates: 30 November–02 December
- Main venue: Hallmann-Dome

The 2012 Ju-Jitsu World Championship were the 11th edition of the Ju-Jitsu World Championships, and were held in Vienna, Austria from November 30 to December 2, 2012.

== Schedule ==
- 30.11.2012 – Men's and Women's Fighting System, Men's and Women's Jiu-Jitsu (ne-waza), Women's Duo System – Classic
- 01.12.2012 – Men's and Women's Fighting System, Men's Duo System – Classic
- 02.12.2012 – Men's and Women's Fighting System, Men's and Women's Jiu-Jitsu (ne-waza), Mixed Duo System – Classic

== European Ju-Jitsu ==
=== Fighting System ===
==== Men's events ====
Category	Gold	Silver	Bronze	
–56 kg	Peter Morgner (GER)	Oliver Haider (AUT)	Igor Filippov (RUS)	Andrea Ventimiglia (ITA)
–62 kg	Farid Benali (FRA)	Javier García (ESP)	Pavel Korzhavykh (RUS)	Tileukabyl Amanturliyev (KAZ)
–69 kg	Dmitry Beshenets (RUS)	Giovanni Vitale (ITA)	Mathias Willard (DEN)	Sébastien Marty (FRA)
–77 kg	Percy Kunsa (FRA)	Fredrik Widgren (SWE)	Danny Mathiasen (DEN)	Ilya Borok (RUS)
–85 kg	Aleksey Ivanov (RUS)	Ruslan Batsazov (RUS)	Wout Vringer (NED)	Salim Salmanov (AZE)
–94 kg	Lazar Kuburović (DEN)	Benjamin Lah (SLO)	Mohsen Hamidi (IRI)	Gertjan Hofland (NED)
+94 kg	Vincent Parisi (FRA)	Simon Roiger (GER)	Mojtaba Akbari (IRI)	Dejan Vukčević (MNE)

==== Women's events ====
Category	Gold	Silver	Bronze	
–49 kg	Agnieszka Bergier (POL)	Laura Vejlgaard (DEN)	Annabelle Reydy (FRA)	Anastasia Tonelli (ITA)
–55 kg	Mandy Sonnemann (GER)	Martyna Bierońska (POL)	Jessica Scricciolo (ITA)	Anna Knutsen (NOR)
–62 kg	Carina Neupert (GER)	Séverine Nébié (FRA)	Sara Widgren (SWE)	Claudia Behnke (GER)
–70 kg	Aleksandra Ivanova (RUS)	Emilia Maćkowiak (POL)	Manuela Lukas (GER)	Lindsay Wyatt (NED)
+70 kg	Catherine Jacques (BEL)	Romy Korn (GER)	Alla Paderina (RUS)	Sabina Predovnik (SLO)

=== Duo System ===
==== Duo Classic events ====
Category	Gold	Silver	Bronze	
men	Dries Beyer (GER); Raphael Rochner (GER)	Ruben Assmann (NED); Marnix Bunnik (NED)	Nikolaus Bichler (AUT); Sebastian Vosta (AUT)	Enrique Sánchez (ESP); Alberto Yagüe (ESP)
women	Mirnesa Bećirović (AUT); Mirneta Bećirović (AUT)	Frauke Kühni (GER); Kerstin Obernosterer (GER)	Alexandra Erni (SUI); Antonia Erni (SUI)	Vera Bichler (AUT); Andrea Gruber (AUT)
mix	Tom Ismer (GER); Dominika Zagorski (GER)	Michele Vallieri (ITA); Sara Paganini (ITA)	Yazid Dalaa (BEL); Wendy Driesen (BEL)	Ruben Assmann (NED); Saskia Boomgaard (NED)

== Brazilian Jiu-Jitsu ==
=== Men's events ===
Category	Gold	Silver	Bronze	
–70 kg	Remus Corbei (ROU)	Fedor Serov (RUS)	Emmanuel Cousin (FRA)	Marcel Leteri (ITA)
–85 kg	Dan Schon (MEX)	Sébastien Lecocq (FRA)	Roy Pariente (ISR)	Fabricio Nascimento (ITA)
+85 kg	Camil Moldoveanu (ROU)	Marcelo Coppa (ITA)	Aleksey Veselovzor (RUS)	Christos Kelletzian (GRE)

=== Women's events ===
Category	Gold	Silver	Bronze	
–58 kg	Océane Talvard (FRA)	Anaïs Chauvel (FRA)	Martyna Bierońska (POL)	Sarah Abdesslem (ITA)
–70 kg	Anna Polok (POL)	Emilia Maćkowiak (POL)	Corinne Beaumont (FRA)	Olga Usoltseva (RUS)
