= Greece at the World Games =

- IOC code: GRE
- Medals Ranked 44th: Gold 6 Silver 11 Bronze 9 Total 26

World Games appearances (overview)
- 1981; 1985; 1989; 1993; 1997; 2001; 2005; 2009; 2013; 2017; 2022; 2025

Greece, the birthplace of the Olympic Games has participated in the World Games since 1997, in various sports, and as of 2022 has won a sum of 26 medals (6 gold, 11 silver, 9 bronze) and holds the 44th place at the all-time World Games medal table.

== Medals ==
=== Medals and place by games ===
Games	Gold	Silver	Bronze	Total	Place
1981 Santa Clara	-	-	-	-	-
1985 London	-	-	-	-	-
1989 Karlsruhe	-	-	-	-	-
1993 Den Haag	-	-	-	-	-
1997 Lahti	1	1	1	3	30
2001 Akita	1	2	0	3	21
2005 Duisburg	1	2	0	3	28
2009 Kaohsiung	1	1	1	3	29
2013 Cali	0	1	1	2	50
2017 Wroclaw	0	1	0	1	53
2022 Birmingham	1	3	4	8	35
2025 Chengdu	1	0	2	3	47
Total	6	11	9	26	44

=== Medals by sport and discipline ===
Sport	Discipline	Gold	Silver	Bronze	Total
Karate	Kumite	2	3	4	9
Waterski & Wakeboard	Waterski	1	3	1	5
Gymnastics	Parkour	1	0	0	1
Gymnastics	Trampoline gymnastics	0	0	1	1
Fitness and Bodybuilding	Bodybuilding	1	0	0	1
Kickboxing	Point Fighting	1	0	0	1
Underwater sports	Finswimming	0	2	3	5
Ju-jitsu	Fighting	0	2	0	2
Weightlifting		0	1	0	1
Total		6	11	9	26

=== Greek medalists at the World Games ===
The Greek athletes who have won medals in the World Games are the following:

No	Games	Name	Medal	Sport	Discipline	Medal event
1	1997 Lahti	Angeliki Andriopoulou	Gold	Waterski & Wakeboard	Waterski	Trick Women
2	1997 Lahti	Ioanna Chatziioannou	Silver	Weightlifting		70 kg Women
3	1997 Lahti	Angeliki Andriopoulou	Bronze	Waterski & Wakeboard	Waterski	Slalom Women
4	2001 Akita	Pavlos Mentis	Gold	Fitness and Bodybuilding	Bodybuilding	Middleweight Men
5	2001 Akita	Konstantinos Papadopoulos	Silver	Karate	Kumite	Open Men
6	2001 Akita	Angeliki Andriopoulou	Silver	Waterski & Wakeboard	Waterski	Overall Women
7	2005 Duisburg	Dimitrios Triantafyllis	Gold	Karate	Kumite	65 kg Men
8	2005 Duisburg	Konstantinos Papadopoulos	Silver	Karate	Kumite	75 kg Men
9	2005 Duisburg	Ioannis Tsourounakis	Silver	Underwater sports	Finswimming	Surface 400m Men
10	2009 Kaohsiung	Michail Georgios Tzanos	Gold	Karate	Kumite	75 kg Men
11	2009 Kaohsiung	Spyridon Margaritopoulos	Silver	Karate	Kumite	80 kg+ Men
12	2009 Kaohsiung	Konstantinos Papadopoulos	Bronze	Karate	Kumite	80 kg Men
13	2013 Cali	Marie Vympranietsova	Silver	Waterski & Wakeboard	Waterski	Jump Women
14	2013 Cali	Michail Georgios Tzanos	Bronze	Karate	Kumite	84 kg Men
15	2017 Wroclaw	Marie Vympranietsova	Silver	Waterski & Wakeboard	Waterski	Jump Women
16	2022 Birmingham	Ioakeim Theodoridis	Gold	Gymnastics	Parkour	Freestyle Men
17	2022 Birmingham	Athanasia Zariopi	Silver	Ju-jitsu	Fighting	48 kg Women
18	2022 Birmingham	Christina Koutoulaki	Silver	Ju-jitsu	Fighting	57 kg Women
19	2022 Birmingham	Stylianos Chatziiliadis	Silver	Underwater sports	Finswimming	Bi Fins 50m Men
20	2022 Birmingham	Dionysios Xenos	Bronze	Karate	Kumite	67 kg Men
21	2022 Birmingham	Christos Ioannis Bonias	Bronze	Underwater sports	Finswimming	Bi Fins 100m Men
22	2022 Birmingham	Christos Ioannis Bonias	Bronze	Underwater sports	Finswimming	Bi Fins 50m Men
23	2022 Birmingham	Anastasios Mylonakis	Bronze	Underwater sports	Finswimming	Surface 100m Men
24	2025 Chengdu	Dimitrios Economo	Gold	Kickboxing	Point Fighting	84kg Men
25	2025 Chengdu	Christos-Stefanos Xenos	Bronze	Karate	Kumite	60kg Men
26	2025 Chengdu	Alexandra Efraimoglou	Bronze	Gymnastics	Trampoline	Tumbling women
