= Rebekka Dahl =

Danish martial artist

Personal information
- Full name: Rebekka Elisabeth Ziska Dahl
- National team: Denmark
- Born: 20 August 1996 (age 29) Hillerød, Denmark

Sport
- Sport: Fighting Ju-jitsu, Judo
- Weight class: -57 kg
- Club: Hillerød ju-jutsu
Medal record
Women's sport ju-jitsu
Representing Denmark
World Games
Gold medal – first place	2017 Wroclaw	Fighting −57 kg
World Championships
Bronze medal – third place	2015 Bangkok	Fighting −57 kg
Bronze medal – third place	2016 Wroclaw	Fighting −57 kg
Bronze medal – third place	2017 Bogota	Fighting −57 kg
Bronze medal – third place	2018 Malmö	Fighting −57 kg
Silver medal – second place	2019 Abu Dhabi	Fighting −57 kg
European Championships
Bronze medal – third place	2017 Banja Luka	Fighting −57 kg
- Updated on 30 November 2019

Rebekka Elisabeth Ziska Dahl (born 20 August 1996) is a Danish martial artist who represents her native country Denmark in sport jujitsu (JJIF).

== Career ==
She began with sport jujitsu at age of 9 in hometown Hillerød. She started training in ju-jitsu by following her brother Bjørn who was also practicing it. Her father is from Faroe Islands.

She has been member of Danish sport jujitsu team since 2013. In 2017 she won gold medal at World Games in Wrocław, discipline Fighting System. She struggled in training the first few years, often considering leaving the sport, but persevered and won her first tournament. She is an alumni representative at the European Youth Olympic Festival.

Since making her competitive sports debut in the adults category in 2015, she has won a medal in every Ju-Jitsu World Championship at 57kg. During the COVID-19 pandemic in Denmark, during lockdown, Dahl was allowed to continue to train Ju-Jitsu as she was considered as one of Denmark's elite athletes. She won a gold medal in Ju-Jitsu at the 2017 World Games in Poland. In 2023, Dahl broke her foot and was a doubt for the World Championship. After seven weeks in a cast and being medically cleared to fight the Saturday before the championships, she won a silver medal. In 2024, Dahl won a gold medal at the Ju-Jitsu European Championship in Gelsenkirchen, Germany.

== Personal life ==
Dahl studied for a master's degree in Science and Humanities in Social Sport Sciences. She had several jobs alongside her studies but now works with helping sportsclubs in Den Haag, Netherlands, getting a more positive sportsculture. outside of sport. She is a vegan. Dahl lives and trains Ju-jitsu in Gouda, Netherlands after starting a relationship with a fellow Dutch practitioner.

=== Results ===
World Games (IWGA + JJIF)
Year	Place	Medal	Discipline	Category
2017	Wrocław, Poland	Gold	Fighting System	−55 kg
2022	Birmingham, United States	Bronze	Fighting System	−57 kg
Ju-Jitsu World Championships (JJIF)
2015	Bangkok, Thailand	Bronze	Fighting System	−55 kg
2016	Wrocław, Poland	Bronze	Fighting System	−55 kg
2017	Bogotá, Colombia	Bronze	Fighting System	−57 kg
2018	Malmö, Sweden	Bronze	Fighting System	−57 kg
2019	Abu Dhabi, United Arab Emirates	Silver	Fighting System	−57 kg
2021	Abu Dhabi, United Arab Emirates	Silver	Fighting System	−57 kg
Ju-Jitsu European Championships (JJEU + JJIF)
2017	Banja Luka, Bosnia and Herzegovina	Bronze	Fighting System	−57 kg
2021	Maintal, Germany	Silver	Fighting System	−57 kg
2024	Gelsenkirchen, Germany	Gold	Fighting System	−57 kg
