= 2016 Ju-Jitsu World Championships =

International martial arts tournament

- Host city: Wrocław, Poland
- Dates: 25–27 November
- Main venue: Hala Orbita

The 2016 Ju-Jitsu World Championship were the 14th edition of the Ju-Jitsu World Championships, and were held in Wrocław, Poland from November 25 to November 27, 2016.

== Schedule ==
- 25.11.2016 – Men's and Women's Fighting System, Men's and Women's Jiu-Jitsu (ne-waza), Women's Duo System – Classic, Mixed Duo System – Show
- 26.11.2016 – Men's and Women's Fighting System, Men's Duo System – Classic, Women's Duo System – Show
- 27.11.2016 – Men's Duo System – Show, Mixed Duo System – Classic, Team event

== European Ju-Jitsu ==
=== Fighting System ===
==== Men's events ====
Category	Gold	Silver	Bronze	
–56 kg	Eldos Kabdenov (KAZ)	Romain Chazette (FRA)	Ara Dzhanikyan (GRE)	Andrea Ventimiglia (ITA)
–62 kg	Roman Apolonov (GER)	Bohdan Močchulskyy (UKR)	Ashot Arustamjan (GER)	Louis Cloots (BEL)
–69 kg	Pavel Korzhavykh (RUS)	Miloš Kovačević (MNE)	Dmitry Beshenets (RUS)	Piero Alessi (ITA)
–77 kg	Ilya Borok (RUS)	Jonas Lund (SWE)	Fredrik Widgren (SWE)	Andreas Knebl (GER)
–85 kg	Denis Belov (RUS)	Mikkel Willard (DEN)	Mateusz Duran (POL)	William Seth-Wenzel (SWE)
–94 kg	Benjamin Lah (SLO)	Tomasz Szewczak (POL)	Dmitry Marchenko (RUS)	Melvin Schol (NED)
+94 kg	Rafał Riss (POL)	Dejan Vukčević (MNE)	Alexandre Fromangé (FRA)	Mikhail Smirnov (RUS)

==== Women's events ====
Category	Gold	Silver	Bronze	
–49 kg	Oksana Moskalenko (RUS)	Anastasia Tonelli (ITA)	Agnieszka Karkosz (POL)	Magdalena Giec (POL)
–55 kg	Martyna Bierońska (POL)	Jessica Scricciolo (ITA)	Licaï Pourtois (BEL)	Rebekka Dahl (DEN)
–62 kg	Séverine Nébié (FRA)	Carina Neupert (GER)	Olga Medvedeva (RUS)	Marta Walotek (POL)
–70 kg	Annalena Bauer (GER)	Chloé Lalande (FRA)	Emilia Maćkowiak (POL)	Aafke van Leeuwen (NED)
+70 kg	Éva Bisséni (FRA)	Alla Paderina (RUS)	Denise Geerders (NED)	Justyna Sitko (POL)

=== Duo System ===
==== Duo Classic events ====
Category	Gold	Silver	Bronze	
men	Ruben Assmann (NED); Marnix Bunnik (NED)	Ben Cloostermans (BEL); Bjarne Lardon (BEL)	Nikolaus Bichler (AUT); Sebastian Vosta (AUT)	Stefano De Caro (ITA); Raffaele Liuzza (ITA)
women	Mirnesa Bećirović (AUT); Mirneta Bećirović (AUT)	Jasmin Ittensohn (GER); Tanja Ittensohn (GER)	Sara Besal (SLO); Patricija Delač (SLO)	Blanca Birn (GER); Annalena Sturm (GER)
mixed	Thomas Schönenberger (SUI); Sofia Jokl (SUI)	Michele Vallieri (ITA); Sara Paganini (ITA)	Florian Petritsch (SUI); Antonia Erni (SUI)	Ian Lodens (BEL); Charis Gravensteyn (BEL)

==== Duo Show events ====
Category	Gold	Silver	Bronze	
men	Vuk Dragutinović (MNE); Stefan Vukotić (MNE)	Warut Netpong (THA); Thammanun Pothaisong (THA)	Ionuț Dobre (ROU); Doru Galan (ROU)	Ryszard Matuszczyk (POL); Damian Paszewski (POL)
women	Jasmin Ittensohn (GER); Tanja Ittensohn (GER)	Suphawadee Kaeosrasaen (THA); Kunsatri Kumsroi (THA)	Wiktoria Lechowicz (POL); Martyna Wowra (POL)	
mixed	Santiago Carrasco (ESP); María Merino (ESP)	Carlos Bohoyo (ESP); Luna Martincan (ESP)	Ratcharat Yimprai (THA); Arreewan Chansri (THA)	

== Brazilian Jiu-Jitsu ==
=== Men's events ===
Category	Gold	Silver	Bronze	
–56 kg	Darkhan Nortajyev (KAZ)	Kuandyk Konysov (KAZ)	Santo Roger (BEL)	Jeison Mora (COL)
–62 kg	Jędrzej Loska (POL)	Ron Cohen (ISR)	Nadav Mandil (ISR)	Giorgi Razmadze (RUS)
–69 kg	Maciej Polok (POL)	Haidar Abbas (FRA)	Evyatar Paperni (ISR)	Zainutdin Zaynukov (RUS)
–77 kg	Alan Ciku (BEL)	Ilke Bulut (SUI)	Horațiu Balint (ROU)	Maciej Kozak (POL)
–85 kg	Dan Schon (MEX)	Paweł Bańczyk (POL)	Abdulbari Guseynov (RUS)	Haidar Al-Rasheed (JOR)
–94 kg	Faisal Al-Ketbi (UAE)	Ivan Tomasetti (ITA)	Reda Mebtouche (FRA)	Florent Minguet (BEL)
+94 kg	Aleksandr Sak (RUS)	Danny Feliz (SUI)	Frédéric Husson (FRA)	Seif-Eddine Houmine (MAR)

=== Women's events ===
Category	Gold	Silver	Bronze	
–49 kg	Anna Augustyn-Mitkowska (POL)	Oksana Moskalenko (RUS)	Ximena Pedraza (COL)	Ana Dias (POR)
–55 kg	Amal Amjahid (BEL)	Laurence Fouillat (FRA)	Martyna Bierońska (POL)	Tine Scheldeman (BEL)
–62 kg	Fran Vanderstukken (BEL)	Alexandra Magomedov (RUS)	Clara Dufau (FRA)	Sandra Pniak (POL)
–70 kg	Diana Halldén (SWE)	Irena Preiss (POL)	Rana Qubbaj (JOR)	Yara Kakish (JOR)
+70 kg	Lama Alqubaj (JOR)	Magdalena Loska (POL)	Éva Bisséni (FRA)	Justyna Sitko (POL)

== Team event ==
Category	Gold	Silver	Bronze	
mixed teams	Germany	Poland	Netherlands	Colombia
