= 2000 Ju-Jitsu World Championships =

- Host city: Copenhagen, Denmark
- Dates: 25–26 November
- Main venue: Valby-Hallen

The 2000 Ju-Jitsu World Championship were the 4th edition of the Ju-Jitsu World Championships, and were held in Copenhagen, Denmark from November 25 to November 26, 2000.

== Schedule ==
- 25.11.2000 – Men's and Women's Fighting System, Women's Duo System – Classic, Mixed Duo System – Classic
- 26.11.2000 – Men's and Women's Fighting System, Men's Duo System – Classic

== European Ju-Jitsu ==
=== Fighting System ===
==== Men's events ====
Category	Gold	Silver	Bronze	
–62 kg	Kelly Molinari (FRA)	Nils Schalhorst (GER)	Taco Morren (NED)	Dariusz Świercz (POL)
–69 kg	Gerhard Ableidinger (AUT)	Peter Petrovič (SLO)	Christian Mattle (DEN)	Daniel Gascó (ESP)
–77 kg	Jan Henningsen (DEN)	Didier Cézar (FRA)	Michel van Rijt (NED)	Gregory Vallarino (URU)
–85 kg	Rob Haans (NED)	Peter Bevc (SLO)	Ricard Carneborn (SWE)	Thierry Grimaud (FRA)
–94 kg	Eduardo Figueiredo (BRA)	Kamal Temal (FRA)	Grzegorz Zimoląg (POL)	Ralf Witzkowski (GER)
+94 kg	Marcelo Figueiredo (BRA)	Dariusz Zimoląg (POL)	Remco Pardoel (NED)	Jean-Jacques Ségui (FRA)

==== Women's events ====
Category	Gold	Silver	Bronze	
–55 kg	Annabelle Reydy (FRA)	Simone Schmitt-Jacobs (GER)	Mariam Rosenwanger (DEN)	Diana Gascó (ESP)
–62 kg	Katrin Berger (GER)	Patricia Hekkens (NED)	Petra Gasselich (AUT)	Emmanuelle Toucanne (FRA)
–70 kg	Judith de Weerd (NED)	Sophie Albert (FRA)	Anna Dimberg (SWE)	Nicole Sydbøge (DEN)
+70 kg	Sabine Felser (GER)	Aude Engrand (FRA)	Alicja Lasota (POL)	Jennie Brolin (SWE)

=== Duo System ===
==== Duo Classic events ====
Category	Gold	Silver	Bronze	
men	Andreas Richter (GER); Raik Tietze (GER)	Tom Jacobs (BEL); Wim Kersemans (BEL)	Jérôme Laurent (FRA); Bruno Pereira (FRA)	Thomas Darholt (DEN); Kent Hielscher (DEN)
women	Karina Lauridsen (DEN); Vibeke Mortensen (DEN)	Sandy Van Landeghem (BEL); Vanessa Van de Vijver (BEL)	Silvia Alvarez (NED); Nuray Batman (NED)	Simona Ferrari (ITA); Valeria Zaccaria (ITA)
mixed	Frank Stjernholm (DEN); Camilla Prien (DEN)	Daniel Hofmann (AUT); Marion Tremel (AUT)	Barry van Bommel (NED); Angelique Poort (NED)	Miguel Ángel Benítez (ESP); Isabel Talavera (ESP)
