= Bećirović twins =

Austrian martial artists

Mirnesa and Mirneta Bećirović
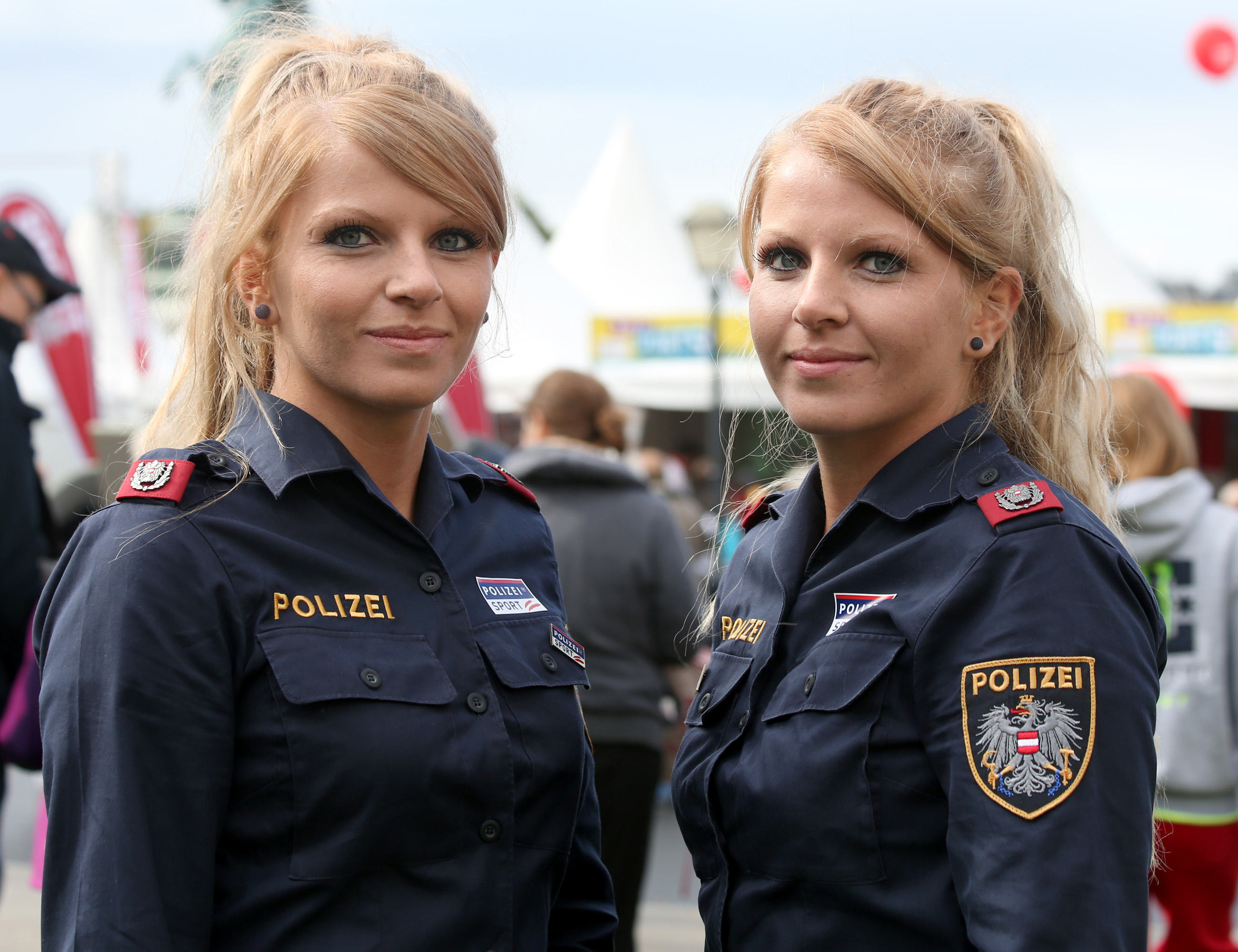

Personal information
- Full name: Mirnesa Bećirović and Mirneta Bećirović
- National team: Austria
- Born: November 1, 1991 (age 34) Zvornik, Yugoslavia

Sport
- Sport: Duo Ju-jitsu, Karate, Judo, Aikido
- Club: Jiu Jitsu Goshindo Pressbaum
- Coached by: Robert Horák; Matthias Gastgeb
Medal record
Women's sport ju-jitsu
Representing Austria
World Games
Gold medal – first place	2013 Cali	Duo Classic
Gold medal – first place	2017 Wroclaw	Duo Classic
World Combat Games
Gold medal – first place	2013 St. Petersburg	Duo Classic
World Championships
Bronze medal – third place	2010 St. Petersburg	Duo Classic
Silver medal – second place	2011 Cali	Duo Classic
Gold medal – first place	2012 Vienna	Duo Classic
Gold medal – first place	2014 Paris	Duo Classic
Gold medal – first place	2015 Bangkok	Duo Classic
Gold medal – first place	2015 Bangkok	Duo Show
Gold medal – first place	2016 Wroclaw	Duo Classic
Gold medal – first place	2017 Bogota	Duo Classic
Gold medal – first place	2018 Malmö	Duo Classic
Gold medal – first place	2019 Abu Dhabi	Duo Classic
Gold medal – first place	2021	Duo Classic
Gold medal – first place	2022	Duo Classic
European Championships
Gold medal – first place	2013 Walldorf	Duo Classic
Gold medal – first place	2015 Almere	Duo Classic
Gold medal – first place	2017 Banja Luka	Duo Classic
Gold medal – first place	2018 Gliwice	Duo Classic
Gold medal – first place	2019 Bucharest	Duo Classic
- Updated on 30 November 2019

Mirnesa Bećirović and Mirneta Bećirović (born 1 November 1991) are twin Austrian martial artists of Bosnian origin who represent Austria in sport jujitsu in the pair discipline Duo System (Kata).

== Career ==
The twins were born in Zvornik, in Bosnia, but when they were eight months old moved with their parents to Pressbaum in Austria because of the war in Bosnia. They began their martial arts training at the age of 6, and are members of the Jiu Jitsu Goshindo club in Pressbaum, where they have been trained by Robert Horak. The twins graduated together from education in law enforcement and as of March 2018 work in Mödling District.

They are undefeated in the highest level tournaments since 2012.
