= Ju-jitsu at the 2017 World Games =

- Venue: GEM Sports Complex
- Dates: 28–29 July 2017
- Competitors: 128 from 41 nations

The Ju-jitsu competition at the World Games 2017 took place from July 28 to July 29, in Wrocław in Poland, at the GEM Sports Complex.

== Participating nations ==
128 competitors, from 41 nations, participated in the tournament.

- Austria (6)
- Belgium (9)
- Bulgaria (1)
- Colombia (5)
- Ivory Coast (1)
- Denmark (4)
- Ethiopia (1)
- France (7)
- Germany (10)
- Greece (2)
- Hungary (1)
- Iran (1)
- Israel (3)
- Italy (6)
- Japan (1)
- Jordan (2)
- Kazakhstan (1)
- Kyrgyzstan (1)
- Lebanon (1)
- Mauritius (2)
- Mexico (3)
- Mongolia (1)
- Montenegro (3)
- Morocco (1)
- Netherlands (6)
- Pakistan (2)
- Poland (8)
- Portugal (1)
- Romania (2)
- Russia (7)
- Slovenia (4)
- Spain (1)
- Sweden (4)
- Switzerland (6)
- Thailand (2)
- Tunisia (1)
- Turkmenistan (1)
- Ukraine (2)
- United Arab Emirates (4)
- Uruguay (2)
- Vietnam (2)

== Medal table ==
Rank	Nation	Gold	Silver	Bronze	Total
1	France	3	3	0	6
2	Germany	2	2	3	7
2	Poland	2	2	3	7
4	Belgium	2	1	3	6
5	Austria	2	0	0	2
5	Denmark	2	0	0	2
7	Russia	1	3	2	6
8	Italy	1	1	1	3
8	Netherlands	1	1	1	3
10	Hungary	1	1	0	2
10	Switzerland	1	1	0	2
10	United Arab Emirates	1	1	0	2
13	Mexico	1	0	1	2
13	Morocco	1	0	1	2
15	Ukraine	1	0	0	1
16	Colombia	0	2	0	2
17	Slovenia	0	1	1	2
18	Iran	0	1	0	1
18	Jordan	0	1	0	1
18	Mongolia	0	1	0	1
21	Sweden	0	0	2	2
22	Israel	0	0	1	1
22	Japan	0	0	1	1
22	Montenegro	0	0	1	1
22	Portugal	0	0	1	1
Totals (25 entries)		22	22	22	66

== Medalists ==
=== Duo ===
Event	Gold	Silver	Bronze
Men	Austria (AUT); Nicolaus Bichler; Sebastian Vosta	Netherlands (NED); Ruben Assmann; Marnix Willem Bunnik	Belgium (BEL); Ben Jos Cloostermans; Bjarne Lardon
Women	Austria (AUT); Mirnesa Bećirović; Mirneta Bećirović	Slovenia (SLO); Sara Besal; Patricija Delač	Germany (GER); Blanca Birn; Annalena Sturm
Mixed	Italy (ITA); Sara Paganini; Michele Vallierei	Germany (GER); Julia Paszkiewicz; Johannes Tourbeslis	Belgium (BEL); Charis Jessy Gravensteyn; Ian Rudy Lodens

=== Men's fighting ===
Event	Gold	Silver	Bronze
−62 kg	Bohdan Mochulskyi; Ukraine	Jairo Alejandro Viviescas Ortíz; Colombia	Roman Apolonov; Germany
−69 kg	Boy Vogelzang; Netherlands	Pavel Korzhavykh; Russia	Eduardo Alberto Gutiérrez Cortés; Mexico
−77 kg	Ilia Borok; Russia	Andreas Stefan Knebl; Germany	Fredrik Widgren; Sweden
−85 kg	Mikkel Brix Willard; Denmark	Denis Belov; Russia	William Seth-Wenzel; Sweden
−94 kg	Tomasz Szewczak; Poland	Mohsen Hamid Aghchay; Iran	Benjamin Lah; Slovenia
+94 kg	Alexandre Fromangé; France	Rafał Riss; Poland	Dejan Vukčević; Montenegro

=== Men's ne-waza ===
Event	Gold	Silver	Bronze
−62 kg	Jędrzej Loska; Poland	Jairo Alejandro Viviescas Ortíz; Colombia	Joao Carlos Hiroshi Kuraoka; Japan
−69 kg	Haidar Raza Abbas; France	Maciej Polok; Poland	Evyatar Paperni; Israel
−77 kg	Ilke Kubilay Bulut; Switzerland	Wim Deputter; Belgium	Maciej Kozak; Poland
−85 kg	Dan Melvin Schon Weinberg; Mexico	Daniel de Maddalena; Switzerland	Abdulbari Guseinov; Russia
−94 kg	Faisal Al-Ketbi; United Arab Emirates	Kristóf Szűcs; Hungary	Florent Minguet; Belgium
+94 kg	Seif-Eddine Houmine; Morocco	Frédéric Husson; France	Aleksandr Sak; Russia
Open	Kristóf Szűcs; Hungary	Faisal Al-Ketbi; United Arab Emirates	Seif-Eddine Houmine; Morocco

=== Women's fighting ===
Event	Gold	Silver	Bronze
−55 kg	Rebekka Dahl; Denmark	Laure Beauchet Ep Doucet; France	Jessica Scricciolo; Italy
−62 kg	Séverine Nébié; France	Annalisa Cavarretta; Italy	Carina Neupert; Germany
−70 kg	Theresa Attenberger; Germany	Chloé Lalande; France	Aafke van Leeuwen; Netherlands

=== Women's ne-waza ===
Event	Gold	Silver	Bronze
−55 kg	Amal Amjahid; Belgium	Bayarmaa Munkhgerel; Mongolia	Ana Nair Marques Dias; Portugal
Open	Amal Amjahid; Belgium	Luma Hatem Sharif Alqubaj; Jordan	Emilia Maćkowiak; Poland

=== Mixed ===
Event	Gold	Silver	Bronze
National team competition	Germany (GER); Roman Apolonov; Theresa Attenberger; Andreas Stefan Knebl; Malte Meinken; Carina Neupert; Julia Paszkiewicz; Johannes Tourbeslis; Tim Weidenbecher	Russia (RUS); Denis Belov; Ilia Borok; Abdulbari Guseinov; Pavel Korzhavykh; Olga Medvedeva; Zainutdin Zainukov	Poland (POL); Magdalena Giec; Maciej Kozak; Jędrzej Loska; Emilia Maćkowiak; Tomasz Szewczak; Marta Walotek
