= 2019 Ju-Jitsu World Championships =

- Host city: Abu Dhabi, United Arab Emirates
- Dates: 20–23 November
- Main venue: Mubadala Arena

The 2019 Ju-Jitsu World Championship were the 17th edition of the Ju-Jitsu World Championships, and were held in Abu Dhabi, United Arab Emirates from November 20 to November 23, 2019.

== Schedule ==
- 20.11.2019 – Men's Fighting System, Men's and Women's Duo System – Classic, Mixed Duo System – Show, Women's Jiu-Jitsu
- 21.11.2019 – Men's and Women's Fighting System, Men's and Women's Duo System – Show, Mixed Duo System – Classic
- 22.11.2019 – Men's Jiu-Jitsu
- 23.11.2019 – Men's Jiu-Jitsu, Team event

== European Ju-Jitsu ==
=== Men's events ===
Category	Gold	Silver	Bronze	
–56 kg	Eldos Kabdenov (KAZ)	Jenis Nurlybayev (KAZ)	Jeison Mora (COL)	Mehdi Hadiha (SWE)
–62 kg	Bohdan Mochulskyy (UKR)	Julien Mathieu (FRA)	Andrea Calzoni (ITA)	Abubakir Janibek (KAZ)
–69 kg	Tim Toplak (SLO)	Dmitry Beshenets (RUS)	Ivan Della Croce (SRB)	Franck Party (FRA)
–77 kg	Fredrik Widgren (SWE)	Percy Kunsa (FRA)	Boy Vogelzang (NED)	Simon Attenberger (GER)
–85 kg	Ilya Borok (RUS)	Denis Belov (RUS)	Christos Zygouras (GRE)	Arso Milić (MNE)
–94 kg	Junior Cabezas (COL)	Mikhail Kostyuk (RUS)	William Seth-Wenzel (SWE)	Alexandre Perez (FRA)
+94 kg	Artem Petrukhin (RUS)	Dejan Vukčević (MNE)	Rado Mollenhauer (GER)	Simon Roiger (GER)

=== Women's events ===
Category	Gold	Silver	Bronze	
–45 kg	Amp Suwanan (THA)	Alexandra Humbert (FRA)	Beatriz Abad (ESP)	
–48 kg	Oksana Moskalenko (RUS)	Morgane Houx (FRA)	Sandra Badie (FRA)	Martina Porcile (ITA)
–52 kg	Estelle Gaspard (FRA)	Magdalena Giec (POL)	Dariya Honcharenko (UKR)	Antonella Farné (ITA)
–57 kg	Licaï Pourtois (BEL)	Rebekka Dahl (DEN)	Betty Bonnet (FRA)	Christina Kutoulakis (GRE)
–63 kg	Juliana Ferreira (FRA)	Lilian Weiken (GER)	Franziska Freudenberger (GER)	Anne van der Brugge (NED)
–70 kg	Aafke van Leeuwen (NED)	Theresa Attenberger (GER)	Chloé Lalande (FRA)	Clarisse Habricot (FRA)
+70 kg	Alla Paderina (RUS)	Charella Westra (NED)	Éva Bisséni (FRA)	Nadina Biljanović (CRO)

=== Duo System ===
==== Duo Classic events ====
Category	Gold	Silver	Bronze	
men	Ian Lodens (BEL); Ryan Lodens (BEL)	Ian Butler (GER); Felix Paszkiewicz (GER)	Ionuț Dobre (ROU); Doru Galan (ROU)	David Mitterer (AUT); Martin Tremetzberger (AUT)
women	Mirnesa Bećirović (AUT); Mirneta Bećirović (AUT)	Blanca Birn (GER); Annalena Sturm (GER)	Lucía Llorente (ESP); Marta Lord (ESP)	Nikiya Dams (BEL); Marion Decrop (BEL)
mixed	Ian Lodens (BEL); Charis Gravensteyn (BEL)	Stefan Vukotić (MNE); Lidija Caković (MNE)	Vuk Dragutinović (MNE); Aleksandra Popović (MNE)	Thomas Schönenberger (SUI); Sofia Jokl (SUI)

==== Duo Show events ====
Category	Gold	Silver	Bronze	
men	Warut Netpong (THA); Thammanun Pothaisong (THA)	Ionuț Dobre (ROU); Doru Galan (ROU)	Carlos Bohoyo (ESP); Ignacio Llorente (ESP)	Zhang Yongshi (TPE); Wang Baixiang (TPE)
women	Suphawadee Kaeosrasaen (THA); Kunsatri Kumsroi (THA)	Biljana Mitrović (MNE); Anastazija Petrović (MNE)	Chawisa Tong (THA); Lalita Yunnan (THA)	Lucía Llorente (ESP); Marta Lord (ESP)
mix	Stefan Vukotić (MNE); Lidija Caković (MNE)	Vuk Dragutinović (MNE); Aleksandra Popović (MNE)	Iker Uriarte (ESP); Beatriz Martín (ESP)	Ionuț Dobre (ROU); Genoveva Dobre (ROU)

== Brazilian Jiu-Jitsu ==
=== Men's events ===
Category	Gold	Silver	Bronze	
–56 kg	Zayed AlKatheeri (UAE)	Faris Kashmeeri (KSA)	Atakeldi Esetov (KAZ)	Amir Malgajdar (KAZ)
–62 kg	Omar Al-Fadhli (UAE)	Darkhan Nortajev (KAZ)	Giorgi Razmadze (RUS)	Nariman Mynbayev (KAZ)
–69 kg	Gairbek Ibragimov (RUS)	Islam Mamilov (KAZ)	Haidar Abbas (FRA)	Michael Sheehan (CAN)
–77 kg	Nimrod Ryeder (ISR)	Hamzeh Al-Rasheed (JOR)	Kieran Kichuk (CAN)	Robert Henek (POL)
–85 kg	Abdulbari Guseynov (RUS)	Abdurahmanhaji Murtazaliyev (KGZ)	Nathan Dos Santos (CAN)	Maciej Kozak (POL)
–94 kg	Faisal Al-Ketbi (UAE)	Julian Stonjek (GER)	Bartosz Zawadzki (POL)	Roy Degan (ISR)
+94 kg	Seif-Eddine Houmine (MAR)	Aleksandr Sak (RUS)	Sergey Boriskin (RUS)	Frédéric Husson (FRA)

=== Women's events ===
Category	Gold	Silver	Bronze	
–45 kg	Amp Suwanan (THA)	Samantha de la Costa (PHI)	Alexandra Humbert (FRA)	
–48 kg	Vicky Hoang (CAN)	Laetitia Boes (FRA)	Oleksandra Rusetskaya (UKR)	Morgane Houx (FRA)
–52 kg	Möldir Mekenbayeva (KAZ)	Polina Krupskaya (RUS)	Jessica McNeill (CAN)	Linda Lindström (SWE)
–57 kg	Amal Amjahid (BEL)	Fran Vanderstukken (BEL)	Meshi Rosenfeld (ISR)	Zofia Szawernowska (POL)
–63 kg	Seong Gi-ra (KOR)	Rony Nisimiyan (ISR)	Janine Mutton (CAN)	Maja Povšnar (SLO)
–70 kg	Magdalena Loska (POL)	Yara Kakish (JOR)	Marian Urdabayeva (KAZ)	Alison Tremblay (CAN)
+70 kg	Éva Bisséni (FRA)	Tereza Souza (HUN)	Justyna Sitko (POL)	

== Team event ==
Category	Gold	Silver	Bronze	
mixed teams	France	Germany	Poland	Russia
