= Mehdi Hadiha =

Iranian-Sweden professional jujitsu and Judo athlete

Arash Mehdi Hadiha
Personal information
- Full name: Arash Mehdi Hadiha
- Nationality: Iranian
- Born: 31 December 1989 (age 36) Tehran, Tehran Province, Iran
- Education: Physical Education
- Height: 163 cm (5 ft 4 in)
- Weight: 56 kg (123 lb)

Sport
- Country: Iran
- Sport: Judo, jiujitsu, MMA
- Events: Judo, jiujitsu(sport)
Medal record
Representing Iran- (Sweden)
Men's Fighting
World jiujitsu Championships
Bronze medal – third place	2011 Colombia	-56 kg
Bronze medal – third place	2018 Sweden	-56 kg
Bronze medal – third place	2019 Emirates	-56 kg
Silver medal – second place	2022 Emirates	-56 kg
Silver medal – second place	2023 Mongolia	-56 kg
Asian Judo Championships
Bronze medal – third place	2008 Yemen	-55 kg

Mehdi Hadiha (known as Arash Hadiha, Persian: مهدی هادی ها, born 31 December 1989 in Tehran) is an Iranian-Swedish judo and jiujitsu athlete. Until 2012, he was a member of the Iranian National team of judo and jujitsu and has won a bronze medal competing in 2011 Ju-Jitsu World Championships in Colombia as well as a bronze medal in the 2008 Asian Judo Championship in Yemen. In 2014 Hadiha immigrated to Sweden where he is currently a member of the Swedish Jujitsu National team. He won a bronze medal at the 2018 Ju-Jitsu World Championships in Sweden, a bronze medal at the 2019 Ju-Jitsu World Championships in the United Arab Emirates, a silver medal at the 2022 Ju-Jitsu World in the United Arab Emirates Championships, and a silver medal at the 2023 Ju-Jitsu World Championships in Mongolia.
