= 2017 Ju-Jitsu World Championships =

- Host city: Bogotá, Colombia
- Dates: 24–26 November 2017
- Main venue: Palacio de Los Deportes

The 2017 Ju-Jitsu World Championship were the 15th edition of the Ju-Jitsu World Championships, and were held in Bogotá, Colombia from November 24 to November 26, 2017.

== Schedule ==
- 24.11.2017 – Men's Fighting System, Men's Jiu-Jitsu (ne-waza), Women's Duo System – Classic, Mixed Duo System – Show
- 25.11.2017 – Men's and Women's Fighting System, Men's Jiu-Jitsu (ne-waza), Men's Duo System – Classic, Women's Duo System – Show
- 26.11.2017 – Women's Jiu-Jitsu (ne-waza), Men's Duo System – Show, Mixed Duo System – Classic, Team event

== European Ju-Jitsu ==
=== Fighting System ===
==== Men's events ====
Category	Gold	Silver	Bronze	
–56 kg	Ara Dzhanikyan (GRE)	Eldos Kabdenov (KAZ)	Jeison Mora (COL)	Felipe Iglesias (ESP)
–62 kg	Roman Apolonov (GER)	Bohdan Mochulskyy (UKR)	Ecco van der Veer (NED)	Abubakir Janibek (KAZ)
–69 kg	Dmitry Beshenets (RUS)	Tom Delange (BEL)	Tim Toplak (SLO)	Jaschar Salmanow (GER)
–77 kg	Dawid Karkosz (POL)	Mher Manukyan (RUS)	Nikita Nikitin (RUS)	Nurlan Espolov (KAZ)
–85 kg	Mateusz Duran (POL)	Junior Cabezas (COL)	Donny Donker (NED)	Ilya Borok (RUS)
–94 kg	Ivan Nastenko (UKR)	Mikhail Kostyuk (RUS)	Lukas Bombik (GER)	Melvin Schol (NED)
+94 kg	Dejan Vukčević (MNE)	Rafał Riss (POL)	Makrem Saanouni (TUN)	Mikhail Smirnov (RUS)

==== Women's events ====
Category	Gold	Silver	Bronze	
–49 kg	Andrea Plefka (GER)	Magdalena Giec (POL)	Amp Suwanan (THA)	Romina López (URU)
–55 kg	Martyna Bierońska (POL)	Oksana Moskalenko (RUS)	Rebekka Dahl (DEN)	Chabeli Arenberg-Peeters (NED)
–62 kg	Franziska Freudenberger (GER)	Marta Walotek (POL)	Madeline Choconta (COL)	Aliya Tlepova (KAZ)
–70 kg	Aafke van Leeuwen (NED)	Onanong Sangsirichok (THA)	Maira Ortiz (COL)	Joselyne Edwards (PAN)
+70 kg	Charella Westra (NED)	Alla Paderina (RUS)	Justyna Sitko (POL)	Bianca Feichtlbauer (AUT)

=== Duo System ===
==== Duo Classic events ====
Category	Gold	Silver	Bronze	
men	Nikolaus Bichler (AUT); Sebastian Vosta (AUT)	Vuk Dragutinović (MNE); Stefan Vukotić (MNE)	Ben Cloostermans (BEL); Bjarne Lardon (BEL)	Salah Ben Brahim (ITA); Andrea Stravaganti (ITA)
women	Mirnesa Bećirović (AUT); Mirneta Bećirović (AUT)	Suphawadee Kaeosrasaen (THA); Kunsatri Kumsroi (THA)	Margarita Campos (COL); Sandra Pedraza (COL)	Wiktoria Lechowicz (POL); Martyna Wowra (POL)
mixed	Thomas Schönenberger (SUI); Sofia Jokl (SUI)	Daniel Rejzek (AUT); Jaqueline Horák (AUT)	Johannes Horák (AUT); Sara Hekele (AUT)	Ian Lodens (BEL); Charis Gravensteyn (BEL)

==== Duo Show events ====
Category	Gold	Silver	Bronze	
men	Warut Netpong (THA); Thammanun Pothaisong (THA)	Jirayu Vongsawan (THA); Jirayut Wuttiwannapong (THA)	David Cruz (ESP); Óscar Cruz (ESP)	Vuk Dragutinović (MNE); Stefan Vukotić (MNE)
women	Suphawadee Kaeosrasaen (THA); Kunsatri Kumsroi (THA)	Luna Martincan (ESP); María Merino (ESP)	Margarita Campos (COL); Sandra Pedraza (COL)	Wiktoria Lechowicz (POL); Martyna Wowra (POL)
mixed	Ratcharat Yimprai (THA); Kunsatri Kumsroi (THA)	Carlos Bohoyo (ESP); Luna Martincan (ESP)	Juan Pablo Rojas (COL); Margarita Campos (COL)	Jeison Mora (COL); Madeline Choconta (COL)

== Brazilian Jiu-Jitsu ==
=== Men's events ===
Category	Gold	Silver	Bronze	
–56 kg	Nurjan Seyduali (KAZ)	Santo Roger (BEL)	Itamar Attali (ISR)	Guseyn Guseynov (RUS)
–62 kg	Jędrzej Loska (POL)	Eric Cong-Phan (CAN)	Vicky Dabush (ISR)	Darkhan Nortayev (KAZ)
–69 kg	Maciej Polok (POL)	Zainutdin Zaynukov (RUS)	Mansur Khabibulla (KAZ)	Gairbek Ibragimov (RUS)
–77 kg	Hamzeh Al-Rasheed (JOR)	Alan Ciku (BEL)	Michael Sheehan (CAN)	Ilke Bulut (SUI)
–85 kg	Paweł Bańczyk (POL)	Haidar Al-Rasheed (JOR)	Abdurahmanhaji Murtazaliyev (KGZ)	Reda Hamzaoui (MAR)
–94 kg	Faisal Al-Ketbi (UAE)	Matko Kvesić (CRO)	Piotr Bagiński (POL); Ivan Nastenko (UKR)	Matheus Felipe Xavier (BRA)
+94 kg	Seif-Eddine Houmine (MAR)	Oscar Pereira (CRC)	Ilias Hadi (BEL)	Aleksandr Sak (RUS)

=== Women's events ===
Category	Gold	Silver	Bronze	
–49 kg	Anna Augustyn-Mitkowska (POL)	Möldir Mekenbayeva (KAZ)	Magdalena Giec (POL)	Amp Suwanan (THA)
–55 kg	Jessica McNeill (CAN)	Oksana Moskalenko (RUS)	Martyna Bierońska (POL)	Polina Krupskaya (RUS)
–62 kg	Fran Vanderstukken (BEL)	Maja Povšnar (SLO)	Orapa Senatham (THA)	Sandra Pniak (POL)
–70 kg	Amal Amjahid (BEL)	Ashten Sawitsky (CAN)	Karolina Zawodnik (POL)	Verena Rücker (GER)
+70 kg	Alison Tremblay (CAN)	Justyna Sitko (POL)	Laura Castillo (COL)	

== Team event ==
Category	Gold	Silver	Bronze
mixed teams	Belgium	Poland	Germany
