= Benjamin Lah =

Slovenian martial artist

Personal information
- National team: Slovenia
- Born: 10 November 1985 (age 40) Celje, Slovenia

Sport
- Sport: Fighting Ju-jitsu, Judo
- Weight class: -94 kg
- Club: PKBV Celje
- Coached by: Marjan Fabjan (judo); Marko Gaber
Medal record
Men's sport ju-jitsu
Representing Slovenia
World Games
Bronze medal – third place	2017 Wroclaw	Fighting −94 kg
World Combat Games
Bronze medal – third place	2013 St. Petersburg	Fighting −94 kg
World Championships
Bronze medal – third place	2010 St. Petersburg	Fighting −94 kg
Silver medal – second place	2012 Vienna	Fighting −94 kg
Bronze medal – third place	2014 Paris	Fighting −94 kg
Gold medal – first place	2016 Wroclaw	Fighting −94 kg
Bronze medal – third place	2018 Malmö	Fighting −94 kg
European Championships
Gold medal – first place	2011 Maribor	Fighting −94 kg
Gold medal – first place	2015 Almere	Fighting −94 kg
Gold medal – first place	2018 Gliwice	Fighting −94 kg
Gold medal – first place	2014 Bucharest	Fighting −94 kg
Silver medal – second place	2012 Hanau	Fighting −94 kg
Bronze medal – third place	2016 Ghent	Fighting −94 kg
- Updated on 30 November 2019

Benjamin Lah (born 10 November 1985) is a Slovenian martial artist who represents his native country Slovenia in sport jujitsu (JJIF).

== Career ==
He was starting training judo at age of 11 in hometown Celje. He was trained by famous Slovenian coach Marjan Fabjan but he never reached the highest international level in judo. In late 2005 he switched for sport jujitsu. His native country Slovenia hosted European Championships in 2011 in city Maribor and under supervision of coach Marko Gaber he won his first European title front of home crowd. He is also world champion in sport ju-jitsu from 2016 in Wrocław in discipline Fighting System, category −94 kg.

=== Results ===
World Games (IWGA + JJIF)
Year	Place	Medal	Discipline	Category
2017	Wrocław (Poland)	Bronze	Fighting System	−94 kg
World Combat Games (GAISF + JJIF)
2013	Saint Petersburg (Russia)	Bronze	Fighting System	−94 kg
Ju-Jitsu World Championships (JJIF)
2010	Saint Petersburg (Russia)	Bronze	Fighting System	−94 kg
2012	Vienna (Austria)	Silver	Fighting System	−94 kg
2014	Paris (France)	Bronze	Fighting System	−94 kg
2016	Wrocław (Poland)	Gold	Fighting System	−94 kg
2018	Malmö (Sweden)	Bronze	Fighting System	−94 kg
Ju-Jitsu European Championships (JJEU + JJIF)
2011	Maribor (Slovenia)	Gold	Fighting System	−94 kg
2015	Almere (Netherlands)	Gold	Fighting System	−94 kg
2018	Gliwice (Poland)	Gold	Fighting System	−94 kg
2016	Ghent ( Belgium)	Bronze	Fighting System	−94 kg

Ju-Jitsu European Open Championships (JJEU)
2012	Hanau (Germany)	Silver .	Fighting System	−94 kg .
2014	Bucharest (Romania)	Gold .	Fighting System	−94 kg .
