= Dejan Vukčević =

Montenegrin martial artist

Personal information
- Native name: Дејан Вукчевић
- National team: Montenegro (since 2007); Serbia and Montenegro (till 2007)
- Born: December 9, 1982 (age 43)

Sport
- Sport: Fighting ju-jitsu, judo
- Weight class: +94 kg
- Club: DK Zeta Podgorica
- Coached by: Miloš Ašanin
Medal record
Men's sport ju-jitsu
Representing Montenegro
World Games
Bronze medal – third place	2017 Wroclaw	Fighting +94 kg
World Championships
Bronze medal – third place	2012 Vienna	Fighting +94 kg
Gold medal – first place	2015 Bangkok	Fighting +94 kg
Silver medal – second place	2016 Wroclaw	Fighting +94 kg
Gold medal – first place	2017 Bogota	Fighting +94 kg
Gold medal – first place	2018 Malmö	Fighting +94 kg
Silver medal – second place	2019 Abu Dhabi	Fighting +94 kg
European Championships
Bronze medal – third place	2013 Walldorf	Fighting +94 kg
Bronze medal – third place	2015 Almere	Fighting +94 kg
Silver medal – second place	2017 Banja Luka	Fighting +94 kg
Gold medal – first place	2018 Gliwice	Fighting +94 kg
Silver medal – second place	2019 Bucharest	Fighting +94 kg
- Updated on 30 November 2019

Dejan Vukčević (Montenegrin Cyrillic: Дејан Вукчевић, born 9 December 1982) is a Montenegrin martial artist who represents his native country Montenegro in sport jujitsu and at the amateur level in judo.

He is by profession a member of a Special Anti-terrorist Unit. On 11 December 2018, upon winning the 2018 World Seniors Championship in Malmo, Sweden, he was awarded the gold medal by the then sports minister Nikola Janović.

Nicknamed Golijat for his huge frame, he began with judo as a child. However, he has never reached the highest international level in this Olympic sport.

In 2009, his home city Podgorica hosted the European championships in sport jujitsu, and he was part of the Montenegrin ju-jitsu team for the first time at age 27. Under coach Miloš Ašanin he soon became one of the best jutsukas in the heavyweight category.

He is a three-time individual world champion – 2015, 2017, and 2018 in discipline fighting system, +94 kg weight category.
