= 2018 Ju-Jitsu World Championships =

2018 martial arts championship held in Sweden

- Host city: Malmö, Sweden
- Dates: 23–25 November
- Main venue: Baltiska Hallen

The 2018 Ju-Jitsu World Championship were the 16th edition of the Ju-Jitsu World Championships, and were held in Malmö, Sweden from November 23 to November 25, 2018.

== Schedule ==
- 23.11.2018 – Men's and Women's Fighting System, Men's and Women's Jiu-Jitsu (ne-waza), Mixed Duo System – Classic
- 24.11.2018 – Men's and Women's Fighting System, Men's and Women's Jiu-Jitsu (ne-waza), Men's and Women's Duo System – Classic
- 25.11.2018 – Men's and Women's and Mixed Duo System – Show, Team event

== European Ju-Jitsu ==
=== Fighting System ===
==== Men's events ====
Category	Gold	Silver	Bronze	
–56 kg	Ara Dzhanikyan (GRE)	Jules Simon (FRA)	Mehdi Hadiha (SWE)	Eldos Kabdenov (KAZ)
–62 kg	Julien Mathieu (FRA)	Louis Cloots (BEL)	Julian Schmid (SUI)	Abubakir Janibek (KAZ)
–69 kg	Dmitry Beshenets (RUS)	Tim Toplak (SLO)	Jaschar Salmanow (GER)	Roman Apolonov (GER)
–77 kg	Percy Kunsa (FRA)	Dawid Karkosz (POL)	Jonas Lund (SWE)	Fredrik Widgren (SWE)
–85 kg	William Seth-Wenzel (SWE)	Denis Belov (RUS)	Ilya Borok (RUS)	Nicolas Baez (SUI)
–94 kg	Mikhail Kostyuk (RUS)	Alexandre Perez (FRA)	Lukas Bombik (GER)	Benjamin Lah (SLO)
+94 kg	Dejan Vukčević (MNE)	Arnold Ratajski (POL)	Rado Mollenhauer (GER)	Artem Petrukhin (RUS)

==== Women's events ====
Category	Gold	Silver	Bronze	
–49 kg	Morgane Houx (FRA)	Linda Lindström (SWE)	Amp Suwanan (THA)	Martina Porcile (ITA)
–55 kg	Licaï Pourtois (BEL)	Chabeli Arenberg Peeters (NED)	Jessica Scricciolo (ITA)	Rebekka Dahl (DEN)
–62 kg	Anne van der Brugge (NED)	Séverine Nébié (FRA)	Mirjana Milić (MNE)	Marta Walotek (POL)
–70 kg	Chloé Lalande (FRA)	Annalena Bauer (GER)	Clarisse Habricot (FRA)	Aafke van Leeuwen (NED)
+70 kg	Alla Paderina (RUS)	Éva Bisséni (FRA)	Nadina Biljanović (CRO)	Charella Westra (NED)

=== Duo System ===
==== Duo Classic events ====
Category	Gold	Silver	Bronze	
men	Ian Lodens (BEL); Ryan Lodens (BEL)	Filip Pešić (MNE); Stefan Vukotić (MNE)	Salah Ben Brahim (ITA); Gianmarco Iazzetta (ITA)	Lovro Divjak (SLO); Matic Jakšič (SLO)
women	Mirnesa Bećirović (AUT); Mirneta Bećirović (AUT)	Blanca Birn (GER); Annalena Sturm (GER)	Jasmin Ittensohn (GER); Tanja Ittensohn (GER)	Nikiya Dams (BEL); Marion Decrop (BEL)
mixed	Michele Vallieri (ITA); Sara Paganini (ITA)	Vuk Dragutinović (MNE); Aleksandra Popović (MNE)	Thomas Schönenberger (SUI); Sofia Jokl (SUI)	Ian Lodens (BEL); Charis Gravensteyn (BEL)

==== Duo Show events ====
Category	Gold	Silver	Bronze	
men	Filip Pešić (MNE); Stefan Vukotić (MNE)	Carlos Bohoyo (ESP); Ignacio Llorente (ESP)	Warut Netpong (THA); Thammanun Pothaisong (THA)	Ionuț Dobre (ROU); Doru Galan (ROU)
women	Lalita Yunnan (THA); Chawisa Tong (THA)	Jasmin Ittensohn (GER); Tanja Ittensohn (GER)	Lidija Caković (MNE); Marija Kaljević (MNE)	Sabrina Gschossmann (GER); Sarah Gschossmann (GER)
mixed	Roberto Benati (ITA); Arianna Auricchi (ITA)	Ratcharat Yimprai (THA); Arreewan Chansri (THA)	Vuk Dragutinović (MNE); Aleksandra Popović (MNE)	Stefan Vukotić (MNE); Lidija Caković (MNE)

== Brazilian Jiu-Jitsu ==
=== Men's events ===
Category	Gold	Silver	Bronze	
–56 kg	Omar Al-Fadhli (UAE)	Nurjan Seyduali (KAZ)	Juan Castillo (COL)	Wojciech Gryz (POL)
–62 kg	Je Wan-gi (KOR)	Vicky Dabush (ISR)	Jędrzej Loska (POL)	Anthony De Oliveira (FRA)
–69 kg	Valentin Blumental (FRA)	Zainutdin Zaynukov (RUS)	Gairbek Ibragimov (RUS)	Haidar Abbas (FRA)
–77 kg	Jang In-seong (KOR)	Shakeel Sammady (CAN)	Michael Sheehan (CAN)	Ali Monfaradi (BHR)
–85 kg	Abdulbari Guseynov (RUS)	Nathan Dos Santos (CAN)	Jo Won-hee (KOR)	Maciej Kozak (POL)
–94 kg	Eldar Rafigaev (MDA)	Bartosz Zawadzki (POL)	Joseph Estephan (CAN)	Julian Stonjek (GER)
+94 kg	Camil Moldoveanu (ROU)	Seif-Eddine Houmine (MAR)	Mikael Marffy (SWE)	Sergey Boriskin (RUS)

=== Women's events ===
Category	Gold	Silver	Bronze	
–49 kg	Margarita Ochoa (PHI)	Vicky Hoang (CAN)	Anna Augustyn-Mitkowska (POL)	Laetitia Boes (FRA)
–55 kg	Amal Amjahid (BEL)	Karolina Chłobuszewska (POL)	Galina Duvanova (KAZ)	Meshi Rosenfeld (ISR)
–62 kg	Janine Mutton (CAN)	Maxine Thylin (SWE)	Klaudia Mitko (POL)	Maja Povšnar (SLO)
–70 kg	Stéphanie Faure (FRA)	Ashten Sawitsky (CAN)	Yara Kakish (JOR)	Zafeiria Panagiotarakos (GRE)
+70 kg	Alison Tremblay (CAN)	Tereza Souza (HUN)	Laura Castill (COL)	Éva Bisséni (FRA)

== Team event ==
Did not take place.
