= Séverine Nébié =

Burkinabe judoka

Personal information
- Nationality: Burkina Faso
- Born: 27 November 1982 (age 43) Bandeo Napone, Burkina Faso
- Height: 167 cm (5.48 ft)
- Weight: 63 kg (139 lb)

Sport
- Sport: Judo
- Event: -63 kg
- Club: orleans
Medal record
Women's judo
Representing Burkina Faso
All-Africa Games
Gold medal – first place	2011 Maputo	-63 kg
Women's ju-jitsu
Representing France
World Games
Gold medal – first place	2017 Wrocław	Fighting -62 kg
Silver medal – second place	2013 Cali	Fighting -62 kg
World Championship
Gold medal – first place	2016 Wrocław	Fighting -62 kg
Gold medal – first place	2015 Thailand	Fighting -62 kg
Gold medal – first place	2011 Cali	Jiu-Jitsu -62 kg
Silver medal – second place	2018 Malmö	Fighting -62 kg
Silver medal – second place	2012 Vienne	Fighting -62 kg
Silver medal – second place	2011 Cali	Fighting -62 kg
Bronze medal – third place	2014 Paris	Fighting -62 kg
Bronze medal – third place	2010 St Petersbourg	Fighting -62 kg

Séverine Nébié (born 27 November 1982 in Burkina Faso) is a Burkinabé judoka who trains in France. She competed at the 2012 Summer Olympics in the Women -63kg event and lost in the second round. She was also the flag bearer for Burkina Faso at the opening ceremony. She also competes in ju-jitsu in which she won the world championship 2015 in Thailand.

After she won the silver medal at the women's 62 kg fighting during the World Games 2013 in Cali, competing for France, she even won the gold medal in the next edition in Wrocław in the -62 kg category.

Olympic Games
Preceded by Aïssata Soulama	Flagbearer for Burkina Faso; 2012 London	Succeeded by Rachid Sidibé
