= Ilya Borok =

Russian jiujitsu fighter

Personal information
- Native name: Илья Григорьевич Борок
- Full name: Ilya Grigorievich Borok
- National team: Russian
- Born: August 10, 1993 (age 32) St. Petersburg, Russia
- Education: Comprehensive School for High Sportsmanship; North-West Institute of Management, branch of RANEPA

Sport
- Sport: Jiujitsu
- Weight class: 77 kg
- Turned pro: 2013–
- Coached by: G. M. Borok; D. A. Popov; S. A. Grigoriev
Medal record
Representing Russia
World Games
Silver medal – second place	2013 Cali	Fighting -77 kg
Gold medal – first place	2017 Wroclaw	Fighting -77 kg
World Combat Games
Gold medal – first place	2013 St. Petersburg	Fighting -77 kg
World Championships
Bronze medal – third place	2012 Vienne	Fighting -77 kg
Gold medal – first place	2014 Paris	Fighting -77 kg
Silver medal – second place	2015 Bangkok	Fighting -77 kg
Gold medal – first place	2016 Wroclaw	Fighting -77 kg
Bronze medal – third place	2017 Bogota	Fighting -77 kg
Bronze medal – third place	2018 Malmö	Fighting -85 kg
Gold medal – first place	2019 Abu Dhabi	Fighting -85 kg
European Championships
Gold medal – first place	2013 Walldorf	Fighting -77 kg
Silver medal – second place	2015 Almere	Fighting -77 kg
Bronze medal – third place	2017 Banja Luka	Fighting -85 kg
Bronze medal – third place	2018 Gliwice	Fighting -85 kg
- Updated on 30 November 2019

Ilya Grigorievich Borok (Russian: Илья Григорьевич Борок, born 10 August 1993) is a Russian jiujitsu fighter. Borok has won tournaments in jiujitsu, including the World Championships, the World Games, the World Combat Games and the European Championships.
