= Martyna Bierońska =

Polish martial artist (born 1984)

- Born: Martyna Ewelina Bierońska; November 8, 1984 (age 41); Kielce, Poland
- Nationality: Polish
- Division: -55 kg
- Style: Fighting Ju-jitsu, Brazilian Jiu-jitsu (Ne-waza), Duo Ju-jitsu, Judo
- Trainer: Marian Jasiński

Other information
- Notable clubs: Energetyk Jaworzno (first club); KS. Budowlani Sosnowiec
- Last updated on: 30 November 2019

Martyna Ewelina Bierońska (born 8 November 1984) is a Polish martial artist. She represented her native country Poland in sport jujitsu.

She grew up in the small village of Staniowice near Kielce. After finishing high school she moved to Katowice to study at university. As a freshman of 19 years old, she chose judo as sport for physical education class. After a year of practising judo, her coach recommended her to sport jujitsu club Energetyk Jaworzno as partner for Ryszard Matuszczyk in pair discipline Duo System. In 2007, she became a member of the Polish sport jujitsu team in second discipline Fighting System and since 2011, she combined Fighting System with discipline Ne-waza (Brazilian jiu-jitsu). She was training in Klub Sportowy Budowlani in Sosnowiec, under coach Marian Jasiński. She is three times individual world champion – 2015, 2016, 2017 in discipline Fighting System, category -55 kg and also world champion in ne-waza from 2011.
