= Tomasz Szewczak =

BJJ practitioner

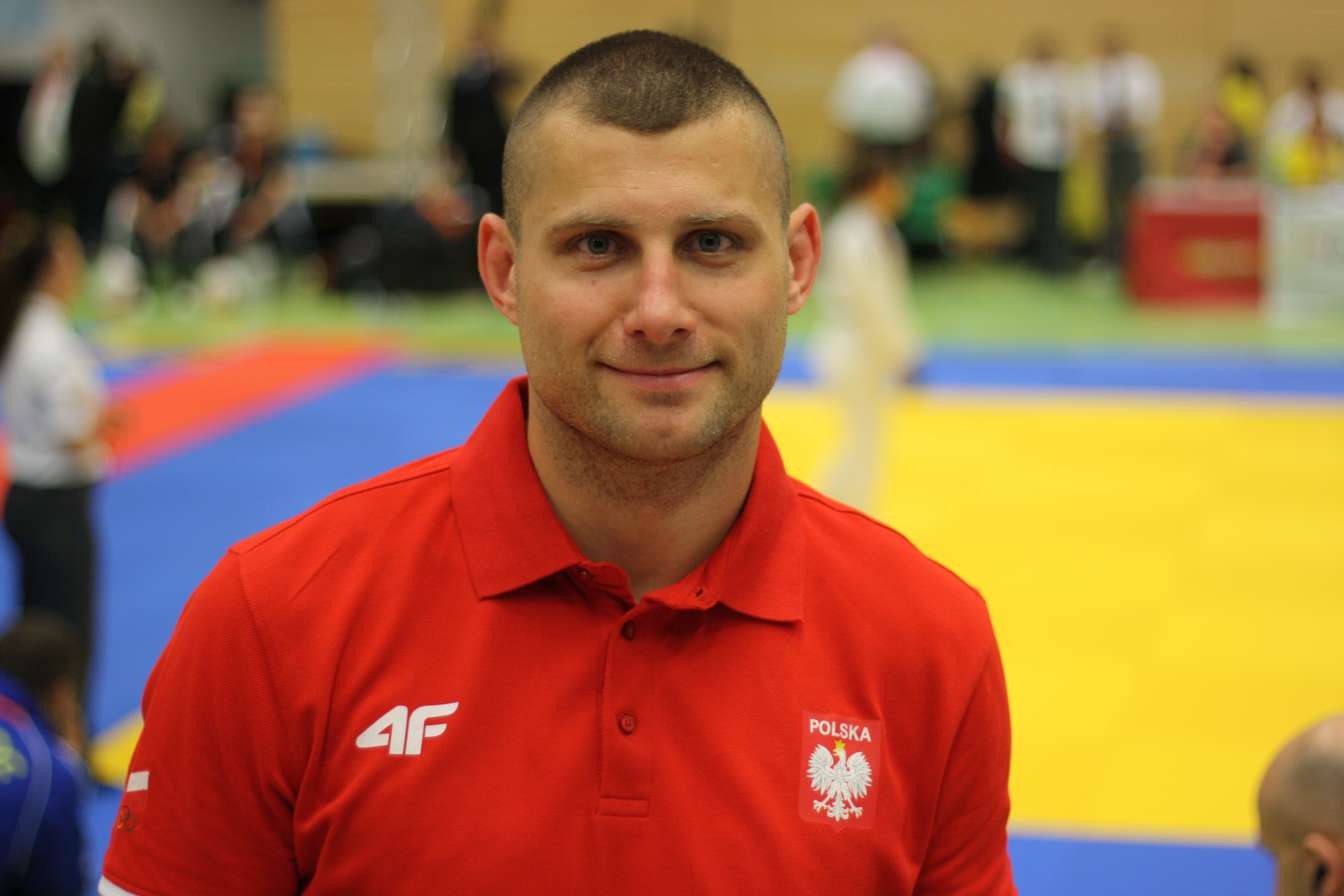

Tomasz Szewczak (born 13 June 1977 in Olsztyn) is a Polish Ju-Jitsu fighter.

== Career ==
Tomasz won a silver medal at the 2013 World Games in the Ju-Jitsu 94 kg Men event.

In the following World Games, he won a gold and a bronze medal in Wrocław, Poland.
