= Ju-Jitsu International Federation =

Governing body of modern ju-jitsu

- Sport: Modern Ju-Jitsu
- Category: Sports federation
- Jurisdiction: Worldwide
- Membership: 130
- Abbreviation: JJIF
- Founded: 1977; 49 years ago (EJJF); 1998; 28 years ago (JJIF)
- Affiliation: Alliance of Independent Recognised Members of Sport (AIMS); International World Games Association (IWGA); Guardian Girls International (GGI)
- Headquarters: Abu Dhabi; United Arab Emirates
- President: Panagiotis Theodoropoulos (Greece)

Official website
- ju-jitsu.sport

The Ju-Jitsu International Federation (JJIF) is the international sports federation and governing body for the sport of Ju-Jitsu, headquartered in Abu Dhabi, United Arab Emirates. Established in 1998, it coordinates and promotes the modern competitive form of ju-jitsu worldwide, commonly known as sport Ju-Jitsu. JJIF has member national federations in more than 130 countries worldwide.

JJIF is a member of the Alliance of Independent Recognised Members of Sport (AIMS) and the International World Games Association (IWGA), both of which are recognized by the International Olympic Committee (IOC). It is also recognized by the Olympic Council of Asia (OCA) and the Fédération Internationale du Sport Universitaire (FISU). JJIF is an official global partner of Guardian Girls International (GGI) for the Guardian Girls Ju-Jitsu (GGJJ) project to advance gender equality and safeguard women and girls through the sport of Ju-Jitsu.

== History ==
The Federation commenced as a coalition of three countries' associations. In 1977, delegates form Germany, Italy and Sweden founded the European Ju-Jitsu Federation (EJJF). As the number of member Nations increased, in and out of Europe, in 1987 the Federation changed its name to International Ju-Jitsu Federation (IJJF) and the original European nucleus of the Federation became the first Continental Union (EJJU) of the IJJF. Following a series of changes of its Statutes and a change to its membership structure, in 1998, the IJJF decided to change its name to the Ju-Jitsu International Federation (JJIF).

In the early 1990s the IJJF became a provisional member of the General Association of International Sport Federations (GAISF), member of International World Games Association (IWGA – part of the Olympic Movement together with the IOC) and affiliated to the Sport for All Federation (FISpT). During the 1998 GAISF Congress the JJIF obtained full membership status.

Ju-Jitsu under JJIF rules has been an event at the World Games since the 1997 World Games in Lahti, Finland.

1. 1977: European Ju-Jitsu Federation (EJJF) (Germany, Italy, Sweden)
2. 1987: International Ju-Jitsu Federation (IJJF) / European Ju-Jitsu Union (EJJU)
3. 1998: Ju-Jitsu International Federation (JJIF)

The JJIF is a member of GAISF and IWGA, and both organizations are in close cooperation with the International Olympic Committee (IOC). The organisation is striving to establish Sports Ju-Jitsu as an Olympic event in the future.

JJIF is a member of the Alliance of Independent Recognised Members of Sport (AIMS) and the International World Games Association (IWGA). The JJIF is currently the only Jujutsu/Ju-Jitsu organization recognized by the GAISF and IWGA; Ju-Jitsu under JJIF rules is a part of the World Games, World Combat Games and Asian Games.

== Regions ==
All 112 nations in the year 2022:

Region	Name	Abbreviation	Members	Links
Europe	Ju-Jitsu European Union _{[de]}	JJEU	35	
Asia	Ju-Jitsu Asian Union	JJAU	37	
Oceania	Ju-Jitsu Oceanian Union	JJOU	4	
Africa	Ju-Jitsu African Union	JJAFU	16	
America	United Society Ju-Jitsu Organization	UPJJ	20	

== Events ==
=== World ===
- Ju-Jitsu World Championships (Since 1994)
- Para Ju-Jitsu World Championships
- Juniors Ju-Jitsu World Championships (Since 2007)
- Masters Ju-Jitsu World Championships
- Specialized World Championship for Professionals
- World Beach Ju-Jitsu tournament (3rd in 2017)

=== JJIF Juniors Ju-Jitsu World Championships ===
https://jjif.sport/jjif-history/

1. 2007 Hanau Germany U18 / U21
2. 2008 Hanau Germany U18 / U21
3. 2009 Athens Greece U18 / U21
4. 2011 Ghent Belgium U18 / U21
5. 2013 Bucharest Romania U18 / U21
6. 2015 Athens Greece U18 / U21
7. 2016 Madrid Spain U18 / U21
8. 2017 Athens Greece U18 / U21
9. 2018 Abu Dhabi UAE U18 / U21
10. 2019 Crete Greece U 16
11. 2019 Abu Dhabi UAE Adults & Masters U16 / U18 / U21/
12. 2021 Abu Dhabi UAE Adults & U16 / U18 / U21
13. 2022 Abu Dhabi UAE Adults & Masters U16 / U18 / U21/
14. 2023 Astana Kasakhstan U16 / U18 / U21
15. 2024 Crete Greece U16 / U18 / U21
- 2011: https://www.sportdata.org/ju-jitsu/set-online/veranstaltung_info_main.php?active_menu=calendar&vernr=6#a_eventhead
- 2018: https://www.sportdata.org/ju-jitsu/set-online/veranstaltung_info_main.php?active_menu=calendar&vernr=34#a_eventhead
- 2019: https://www.sportdata.org/ju-jitsu/set-online/veranstaltung_info_main.php?active_menu=calendar&vernr=150#a_eventhead
- 2019: https://www.sportdata.org/ju-jitsu/set-online/veranstaltung_info_main.php?active_menu=calendar&vernr=161#a_eventhead
- 2021: https://www.sportdata.org/ju-jitsu/set-online/veranstaltung_info_main.php?active_menu=calendar&vernr=257#a_eventhead
- 2022: https://www.sportdata.org/ju-jitsu/set-online/veranstaltung_info_main.php?active_menu=calendar&vernr=325#a_eventhead
- 2023: https://www.sportdata.org/ju-jitsu/set-online/veranstaltung_info_main.php?active_menu=calendar&vernr=440#a_eventhead
- 2024: https://www.sportdata.org/ju-jitsu/set-online/veranstaltung_info_main.php?active_menu=calendar&vernr=636#a_eventhead

=== Masters ===
- 2014: https://www.sportdata.org/ju-jitsu/set-online/veranstaltung_info_main.php?active_menu=calendar&vernr=12#a_eventhead
- 2019: https://www.sportdata.org/ju-jitsu/set-online/veranstaltung_info_main.php?active_menu=calendar&vernr=162#a_eventhead
- 2022: https://www.sportdata.org/ju-jitsu/set-online/veranstaltung_info_main.php?active_menu=calendar&vernr=387#a_eventhead
- 2023: https://www.sportdata.org/ju-jitsu/set-online/veranstaltung_info_main.php?active_menu=calendar&vernr=436#a_eventhead
- 2024: https://www.sportdata.org/ju-jitsu/set-online/veranstaltung_info_main.php?active_menu=calendar&vernr=634#a_eventhead

=== Para ===
- "Verify You are Human". www.sportdata.org.
- "Verify You are Human". www.sportdata.org.
- "Verify You are Human". www.sportdata.org.
- "Verify You are Human". www.sportdata.org.
- "Verify You are Human". www.sportdata.org.

=== Beach ===
- "Verify You are Human". www.sportdata.org.
- "Verify You are Human". www.sportdata.org.
- "Verify You are Human". www.sportdata.org.
- "Verify You are Human". www.sportdata.org.
- "Verify You are Human". www.sportdata.org.

=== University ===
- "Verify You are Human". www.sportdata.org.

=== E-Tournament ===
- "Verify You are Human". www.sportdata.org.
- "Verify You are Human". www.sportdata.org.

=== U14 World Cup ===
- "Verify You are Human". www.sportdata.org.
- "Verify You are Human". www.sportdata.org.

=== European Championship ===
European Non-Governmental Sports Organisation (ENGSO)

Edition	Start	End	Country	City	Sources
40 (Senior)	May 26, 2022	May 28, 2022	Israel		

European IBJJF Jiu-Jitsu Championship

https://jjeu.eu/

https://web.archive.org/web/20250325052757/https://jjeu.eu/organization/

- 2024 (42nd Senior): https://www.sportdata.org/ju-jitsu/set-online/veranstaltung_info_main.php?active_menu=calendar&vernr=450
- 2025: https://www.sportdata.org/ju-jitsu/set-online/veranstaltung_info_main.php?active_menu=calendar&vernr=722#a_eventhead
- "2023 European Jiu-jitsu Championships Zagreb, Croatia. - FICS - International Federation of Sports Chiropractic". fics.sport.
- "Results - EUROPE BJJ CUP KIDS 2023 - Smoothcomp". Archived from the original on 7 December 2025.
- "Verify You are Human". www.sportdata.org.
- "Verify You are Human". www.sportdata.org.

=== Asian Championship ===
Edition	Year	Country	City	Sources
1	2016	Turkmenistan		
2	2017			
3	2018			
4	2019			
5	2021			
6	2022			
7	2023			
8	2024			

9th 2025 Jordan: https://www.sportdata.org/ju-jitsu/set-online/veranstaltung_info_main.php?active_menu=calendar&vernr=794

https://asjjf.org/main/eventInfo/1619

1st Asian Youth: https://www.sportdata.org/ju-jitsu/set-online/veranstaltung_info_main.php?active_menu=calendar&vernr=576 - 2024

2nd Asian Youth: https://www.sportdata.org/ju-jitsu/set-online/veranstaltung_info_main.php?active_menu=calendar&vernr=741&ver_info_action=catlist - 2025

1st U14 Cup 2025 Thailand: https://www.sportdata.org/ju-jitsu/set-online/veranstaltung_info_main.php?active_menu=calendar&vernr=740&ver_info_action=catlist

=== African Championship ===
- "Verify You are Human". www.sportdata.org.
- "Verify You are Human". www.sportdata.org.
- "Verify You are Human". www.sportdata.org.
- "Verify You are Human". www.sportdata.org.
- "Verify You are Human". www.sportdata.org.

=== Pan American Championship ===
- "Verify You are Human". www.sportdata.org.
- "Verify You are Human". www.sportdata.org.
- "Verify You are Human". www.sportdata.org.
- "Verify You are Human". www.sportdata.org.
- "Verify You are Human". www.sportdata.org.
- "Verify You are Human". www.sportdata.org.
- "Verify You are Human". www.sportdata.org.

=== South American ===
- "Verify You are Human". www.sportdata.org.

=== Sub Regional Asian ===
- "Verify You are Human". www.sportdata.org.
- "Verify You are Human". www.sportdata.org.
- "Verify You are Human". www.sportdata.org.
- "Verify You are Human". www.sportdata.org.
- "Verify You are Human". www.sportdata.org.
- "Verify You are Human". www.sportdata.org.
- "Verify You are Human". www.sportdata.org.
- "Verify You are Human". www.sportdata.org.

=== Balkan Championship ===
17th 2022: https://www.sportdata.org/ju-jitsu/set-online/veranstaltung_info_main.php?active_menu=calendar&vernr=357#a_eventhead

== Formats ==
1. 1990 Introduction of Fighting System
2. 2010 Introduction of Discipline “Jiu-Jitsu (Ne-Waza)”
3. 2014 Introduction of Discipline “Show Ju-Jitsu”
4. 2017 Introduction of Discipline “Contact Ju-Jitsu”

== Traditional Jujutsu and Sport Ju-Jitsu ==
Different schools (ryū) have been teaching traditional jujutsu in Japan since the 15th century. The JJIF is not a governing body for any of these schools of traditional Japanese jujutsu – the JJIF does not exercise authority over traditional Japanese jujutsu Koryu styles, which are often instead headed by leaders who claim leadership from unbroken lineages of transmissions from different Japanese ryū, with some of them hundreds of years old.

Rather, the JJIF was founded as an international federation solely for governing Sport Ju-Jitsu, a competitive sport derived from traditional jujutsu.

== Executive committee ==
Name	Role	Country
Panagiotis Theodoropoulos	President	Greece
Abdulmunem Alsayed M. Al Hashmi	President of Asian Union	United Arab Emirates
Nuvin Proag	President of African Union	Mauritius
Robert Perc	President of European Union	Slovenia
Miguel Angel Percoco	President of Panamerican Union	Argentina
Séverine Nebie	Athletes representative	France
Faisal Alkitbe	Athletes representative	United Arab Emirates
Margarita P. Ochoa	appointed Board member	Philippines
Medha Goodary	appointed Board member	Mauritius
Georgiy Kukoverov	Honorary Vice President	Russia
Tomo Borissov	Honorary Vice President	Bulgaria
Igor Lanzoni	Honorary Vice President	Italy
Joachim Thumfart	Director General	Germany
Luc Mortelmans	Director Finance	Belgium
Toni Dahl	Head of Entourage Commission	Denmark

=== Committee Fighting System ===
Name	Role	Country
Dana Mihaela Mortelmans	Sport Director Fighting System	Romania
Ralf Pfeifer	Head Referee Fighting System	Germany
Seyed Amir Khoshbin	Members	Iran
Patrik Tremel	Members	Austria
Andreas Kuhl	Members	Germany
Jonathan Charlot	Members	Mauritius
Jose Dominguez	Members	United States
Michael Piaser	Members	United States
Licaï Pourtois	Members	Belgium

== Rules of Sport Ju-Jitsu ==
JJIF currently regulates three different types of competitions at the international level: the Duo system', Fighting system and Ne Waza.

=== Duo (Kata) ===
The former is a discipline in which a pair of Jutsukas (Ju-Jitsu athlete) from the same team show possible self-defence techniques against a series of 12 attacks, randomly called by the mat referee from the 20 codified attacks to cover the following typologies: grip attack (or strangulation), embrace attack (or necklock), hit attack (punch or kick) and armed attack (stick or knife). Duo is the JJIF's version of Kata.

The Duo system has three competition categories: male, female or mixed, and the athletes are judged for their speed, accuracy, control and realism. It often requires great technical preparation and synchronicity, compared to other disciplines.

=== Fighting (Striking and Grappling) ===
With a different approach, the Fighting System is articulated in a one-on-one competition between athletes. The system is divided in several categories according to weight and sex

(Male categories: −55 kg, −62 kg, −69 kg, −77 kg, −85 kg, −94 kg, +94 kg; Female categories −48 kg, −55 kg, −62 kg, −70 kg, +70 kg).

The actual competition is divided in three phases (Parts): Part I sees the jutsukas involved in distance combat (controlled attacks with arms and legs and atemis of various nature – punches, strikes and kicks). Once a grab has been made the Fight enters Part II and hits are no longer allowed.

The jutsukas try to bring one another down with various throwing techniques (and points are given according to how "clean" and effective the action was). Also – despite being uncommon – submission techniques as controlled strangulations and locks are allowed in part II.

Once down on the tatamis (mats) the match enters its Part III. Here points are given for immobilisation techniques, controlled strangulations or levers on body joints that bring the opponent to yield.

The winner is the Jutsuka who has accumulated most points during the fight. Automatic victory is assigned to the Jutsuka who gets an "Ippon" (clean action, full points) in all three parts. This type of competition requires timing, agility, strength and endurance.

=== Newaza (Grappling) ===
In Brazilian Jiu-Jitsu, the associated competition discipline is called Ne-Waza, which is a fairly new discipline in the official JIF competition program. It was included in 2010, and established in the World Games 2013 in two initial categories (men -85kg and women - 70kg). From 2014 the competition is held in 10 weight divisions:

- Male: -56kg, -62 kg, -69kg, -77kg, -85kg, -94kg, +94kg

Female: -49kg, -55kg, -62kg, -70kg, +70kg

2019 the number of female categories was increased:

- Female: -45kg; -48kg; -52kg; -57kg; -63kg; -70kg; +70kg

== Guardian Girls Ju-Jitsu ==
Guardian Girls Ju-Jitsu (GGJJ) is a global project launched by Guardian Girls International (GGI) in partnership with the JJIF to advance gender equality and safeguard women and girls through Ju-Jitsu. On November 4, 2025, Shin Koyamada, the Chairman of the GGI and Panagiotis Theodoropoulos, the President of the JJIF signed a global Memorandum of Understanding during the Ju-Jitsu World Championships in Bangkok, Thailand, formally establishing the partnership and introducing the project at the international level.

== See also ==
- International Brazilian Jiu-Jitsu Federation
- German ju-jutsu
- Atemi Ju-Jitsu
- Brazilian jiu-jitsu
- Submission wrestling (Guerrilla Jiu Jitsu)
- Jujutsu
- Pankration
- Grappling
- Catch wrestling
