= Ju-Jitsu World Championships =

International spots event

Competition details
- Discipline: Ju-Jitsu
- Type: Annual
- Organiser: JJIF

History
- First edition: 1994 Cento, Italy
- Most recent: 2026 Antalya, Turkey

The Ju-Jitsu World Championships is an international Ju-Jitsu competition held once every two years by the Ju-Jitsu International Federation and has been held since 1994.

== Events ==
=== Formats ===
1. 1990 Introduction of Fighting System
2. 2010 Introduction of Discipline “Jiu-Jitsu (Ne-Waza)”
3. 2014 Introduction of Discipline “Show Ju-Jitsu”
4. 2017 Introduction of Discipline “Contact Ju-Jitsu”

=== Senior ===
Number	Year	Start date	End date	Host City	Host Country	Ref.
1	1994	25 November 1994	27 November 1994	Cento	Italy	
2	1996	23 November 1996	24 November 1996	Paris	France	
3	1998	21 November 1998	22 November 1998	Berlin	Germany	
4	2000	25 November	26 November	Copenhagen	Denmark	
5	2002	23 November	24 November	Punta del Este	Uruguay	
6	2004	26 November	28 November	Móstoles	Spain	
7	2006	17 November	19 November	Rotterdam	Netherlands	
8	2008	28 November	30 November	Malmö	Sweden	
9	2010	27 November	28 November	Saint Petersburg	Russia	
10	2011	15 October	16 October	Cali	Colombia	
11	2012	30 November	2 December	Vienna	Austria	
12	2014	28 November	30 November	Paris	France	
13	2015	20 November	22 November	Bangkok	Thailand	
14	2016	25 November	27 November	Wrocław	Poland	
15	2017	24 November	26 November	Bogotá	Colombia	
16	2018	23 November	25 November	Malmö	Sweden	
17	2019	20 November	23 November	Abu Dhabi	United Arab Emirates	
18	2021	2021	2021	Abu Dhabi	United Arab Emirates	
19	2022	2022	2022	Abu Dhabi	United Arab Emirates	
20	2024	24 October 2024	3 November 2024	Heraklion	Greece	
21	2026	14 May 2026	17 May 2026	Antalya	Turkey	

=== Junior ===
9th JJIF Ju-Jitsu World Championship for Aspirants (U18) and Juniors (U21) 2018 in UAE. 40 countries registered.

Results:

JJIF Juniors Ju-Jitsu World Championships:

- 2011: https://www.sportdata.org/ju-jitsu/set-online/veranstaltung_info_main.php?active_menu=calendar&vernr=6#a_eventhead
- 2018: https://www.sportdata.org/ju-jitsu/set-online/veranstaltung_info_main.php?active_menu=calendar&vernr=34#a_eventhead
- 2019: https://www.sportdata.org/ju-jitsu/set-online/veranstaltung_info_main.php?active_menu=calendar&vernr=150#a_eventhead
- 2019: https://www.sportdata.org/ju-jitsu/set-online/veranstaltung_info_main.php?active_menu=calendar&vernr=161#a_eventhead
- 2021: https://www.sportdata.org/ju-jitsu/set-online/veranstaltung_info_main.php?active_menu=calendar&vernr=257#a_eventhead
- 2022: https://www.sportdata.org/ju-jitsu/set-online/veranstaltung_info_main.php?active_menu=calendar&vernr=325#a_eventhead
- 2023: https://www.sportdata.org/ju-jitsu/set-online/veranstaltung_info_main.php?active_menu=calendar&vernr=440#a_eventhead
- 2024: https://www.sportdata.org/ju-jitsu/set-online/veranstaltung_info_main.php?active_menu=calendar&vernr=636#a_eventhead
1. 2007 Hanau Germany U18 / U21
2. 2008 Hanau Germany U18 / U21
3. 2009 Athens Greece U18 / U21
4. 2011 Ghent Belgium U18 / U21
5. 2013 Bucharest Romania U18 / U21
6. 2015 Athens Greece U18 / U21
7. 2016 Madrid Spain U18 / U21
8. 2017 Athens Greece U18 / U21
9. 2018 Abu Dhabi UAE U18 / U21
10. 2019 Crete Greece U 16
11. 2019 Abu Dhabi UAE Adults & Masters U16 / U18 / U21/
12. 2021 Abu Dhabi UAE Adults & U16 / U18 / U21
13. 2022 Abu Dhabi UAE Adults & Masters U16 / U18 / U21/
14. 2023 Astana Kasakhstan U16 / U18 / U21
15. 2024 Crete Greece U16 / U18 / U21

== See also ==
- World IBJJF Jiu-Jitsu Championship
- European IBJJF Jiu-Jitsu Championship
- European IBJJF Jiu-Jitsu No-Gi Championship
- Asian IBJJF Jiu-Jitsu Championship
