= Muaythai at the World Combat Games =

- Governing body: IFMA
- Events: 11 (men: 8; women: 3)

Games
- 2010; 2013; 2023

Muaythai (Note: Muaythai is the official name of Muay Thai, recognized by Global Association of International Sports Federations and International Olympic Committee.) was featured in the World Combat Games official programme for the first time at the 2010 World Combat Games in Beijing, China. It has been played at all editions since then. The International Federation of Muaythai Associations is governing body for muaythai at the World Combat Games.

== Summary ==
Games	Year	Events	Best Nation
1	2010	11	Thailand
2	2013	11	Russia
3	2023	23	Saudi Arabia

== Events ==
The muaythai competition is organized as a set of tournaments, one for each weight class. The number of weight classes has never changed in the two editions (currently 8 for men and 3 for women), and the definition of each class has changed several times, as shown in the following table. Weights were measured in kilograms.

Event	Men	Women
Flyweight	–	–51 kg
Bantamweight	–54 kg	–54 kg
Featherweight	–57 kg	–
Lightweight	–	–60 kg
Light welterweight	–63.5 kg	–
Welterweight	–67 kg	–
Light middleweight	–71 kg	–
Middleweight	–75 kg	–
Light heavyweight	–81 kg	–
Heavyweight	–91 kg	–

== Venues ==
For the World Combat Games, there have been two venues that have been or be used to host muaythai.

Games	Venue	Other sports hosted at venue for those games	Capacity	Ref.
2010 Beijing	Olympic Sports Center Gymnasium	Boxing, Kickboxing	7,000	
2013 Saint Petersburg	Yubileyny Sports Complex (Arena 2)	Boxing, Kickboxing, Wushu	7,000	

== Medal table ==
The numbers below are after the 2013 World Combat Games in Saint Petersburg, Russia.

Rank	Nation	Gold	Silver	Bronze	Total
1	Thailand	7	4	3	14
2	Russia	4	4	5	13
3	Ukraine	3	2	6	11
4	Belarus	2	2	2	6
5	Peru	2	0	0	2
6	Canada	1	1	2	4
7	Finland	1	0	1	2
7	Norway	1	0	1	2
9	Spain	1	0	0	1
10	Sweden	0	2	1	3
11	Australia	0	1	4	5
12	Morocco	0	1	3	4
13	China	0	1	2	3
13	Turkey	0	1	2	3
15	Great Britain	0	1	0	1
15	Italy	0	1	0	1
15	Uzbekistan	0	1	0	1
18	France	0	0	2	2
18	Iran	0	0	2	2
18	Kazakhstan	0	0	2	2
21	Brazil	0	0	1	1
21	Germany	0	0	1	1
21	Israel	0	0	1	1
21	Kyrgyzstan	0	0	1	1
21	Malaysia	0	0	1	1
21	South Korea	0	0	1	1
Totals (26 entries)		22	22	44	88
