= 2010 World Combat Games =

I World Combat Games
- Host city: Beijing, China
- Nations: 96
- Events: 118 in 12 sports
- Opening: August 28, 2010
- Closing: September 4, 2010
- Main venue: Beijing National Stadium

The first World Combat Games were held in Beijing, China, from August 28 to September 4, 2010. 136 gold medals were vied for by 1,108 competitors from all five continents.

There were twelve martial arts sports competitions: boxing, judo, ju-jitsu, karate, kendo, kickboxing, muaythai, sambo, sumo, taekwondo, wrestling and wushu.

== Schedule ==
| OC | Opening ceremony | ● | Event competitions | D | Demo | 1 | Event finals | CC | Closing ceremony |

| August–September | 28 Sat | 29 Sun | 30 Mon | 31 Tue | 1 Wed | 2 Thu | 3 Fri | 4 Sat | Gold Medal |
|---|---|---|---|---|---|---|---|---|---|
| Ceremonies | OC | | | | | | | CC | |
| Aikido | | | D | D | | | | | 0 |
| Boxing | | | ● | ● | ● | 10 | | | 10 |
| Judo | ● | 2 | | | | | | | 2 |
| Ju-jitsu | | 5 | 8 | | | | | | 13 |
| Karate | | | | ● | 10 | | | | 10 |
| Kendo | | | | | | | 3 | 1 | 4 |
| Kickboxing | | | | | | | ● | 21 | 21 |
| Muaythai | | ● | | ● | | 11 | | | 11 |
| Sambo | | | | | | | 3 | 3 | 6 |
| Sumo | 4 | 4 | | | | | | | 8 |
| Taekwondo | | | | | | 8 | | | 8 |
| Wrestling | | | | | 5 | 7 | | | 12 |
| Wushu | 8 | 5 | | | | | | | 13 |
| Total Gold Medal | 12 | 16 | 8 | - | 15 | 36 | 6 | 25 | 118 |
| Cumulative Total | 12 | 28 | 36 | 36 | 51 | 87 | 93 | 118 | |
| October | 28 Sat | 29 Sun | 30 Mon | 31 Tue | 1 Wed | 2 Thu | 3 Fri | 4 Sat | Gold Medal |

== Participating nations ==
- Algeria
- Angola
- Argentina
- Armenia
- Australia
- Austria
- Azerbaijan
- Belarus
- Belgium
- Benin
- Bolivia
- Brazil
- Bulgaria
- Cameroon
- Canada
- Chile
- China
- Chinese Taipei
- Colombia
- Congo
- Côte d'Ivoire
- Croatia
- Czech Republic
- Denmark
- Dominica
- Dominican Republic
- Ecuador
- Egypt
- El Salvador
- Estonia
- Finland
- France
- Georgia
- Germany
- Ghana
- Great Britain
- Greece
- Haiti
- Hong Kong
- Hungary
- Iceland
- India
- Indonesia
- Iran
- Ireland
- Israel
- Italy
- Japan
- Jordan
- Kazakhstan
- Kyrgyzstan
- Latvia
- Libya
- Lithuania
- Macau
- Macedonia
- Malaysia
- Mali
- Mauritius
- Mexico
- Moldova
- Mongolia
- Montenegro
- Morocco
- Netherlands
- New Caledonia
- New Zealand
- Norway
- Pakistan
- Paraguay
- Peru
- Philippines
- Poland
- Portugal
- Puerto Rico
- Romania
- Russia
- Senegal
- Serbia
- Singapore
- Slovakia
- Slovenia
- South Africa
- South Korea
- Spain
- Sweden
- Switzerland
- Tajikistan
- Thailand
- Tunisia
- Turkey
- Turkmenistan
- Ukraine
- United States
- Uruguay
- Uzbekistan
- Venezuela
- Vietnam
- Wales

== Ambassadors ==
- Aikido: (Netherlands) Lydia la Rivière-Zijdel
- Arnis: (Philippines) Aruray
- Judo: (Belgium) Robert Van de Walle
- Ju-Jitsu: (France) Bertrand Amoussou-Guenou
- Karate: (Japan) Tsuguo Sakumoto
- Kendo: (Japan) Yoshimitsu Takeyasu
- Kickboxing: (United States) Don Wilson
- Muaythai: (Thailand) Gavintra Photijak
- Sambo: (Russia) Fedor Emelianenko
- Sumo: (Mongolia) Kyokushūzan Noboru
- Taekwondo: (South Korea) Jung Joon-ho
- Wrestling: (United States) Rulon Gardner
- Wushu: (China) Jet Li

== Medalists ==
=== Boxing ===
==== Men ====
| Event | Gold | Silver | Bronze |
|---|---|---|---|
| 49 kg | Zou Shiming; China | Safoviddin Yusufi; Tajikistan | Mohamed Flissi; Algeria |
| 49 kg | Zou Shiming; China | Safoviddin Yusufi; Tajikistan | Juan Medina; Dominican Republic |
| 52 kg | Muhammad Waseem; Pakistan | Dagoberto Agüero; Dominican Republic | Maike Cioacă; Romania |
| 52 kg | Muhammad Waseem; Pakistan | Dagoberto Agüero; Dominican Republic | Li Chao; China |
| 56 kg | Zhang Jiawei; China | Joe Cordina; Wales | Patrik Velký; Czech Republic |
| 56 kg | Zhang Jiawei; China | Joe Cordina; Wales | Mohammad Al-Wadi; Jordan |
| 60 kg | Mohamed Ramadan; Egypt | Asylbek Talasbayev; Kyrgyzstan | Tomasz Michelus; Poland |
| 60 kg | Mohamed Ramadan; Egypt | Asylbek Talasbayev; Kyrgyzstan | Liu Qiang; China |
| 64 kg | Ermek Sakenov; Kyrgyzstan | Hu Richabilige; China | Michał Żeromiński; Poland |
| 64 kg | Ermek Sakenov; Kyrgyzstan | Hu Richabilige; China | Chris Jenkins; Wales |
| 69 kg | Vasile Belous; Moldova | Maimaitituersun Qiong; China | Kamil Gardzielik; Poland |
| 69 kg | Vasile Belous; Moldova | Maimaitituersun Qiong; China | Maksat Alimbaev; Kyrgyzstan |
| 75 kg | Andrés Sira; Venezuela | Vladimir Milevskij; Lithuania | Abdelmalek Rahou; Algeria |
| 75 kg | Andrés Sira; Venezuela | Vladimir Milevskij; Lithuania | Navruz Jafoev; Tajikistan |
| 81 kg | Meng Fanlong; China | Tadas Tamašauskas; Lithuania | Ahmed Maher; Egypt |
| 81 kg | Meng Fanlong; China | Tadas Tamašauskas; Lithuania | Gleb Şapoval; Moldova |
| 91 kg | Constantin Bejenaru; Romania | Ahmad Teimat; Jordan | Jahon Qurbonov; Tajikistan |
| 91 kg | Constantin Bejenaru; Romania | Ahmad Teimat; Jordan | Vitalijus Subačius; Lithuania |
| +91 kg | Roberto Cammarelle; Italy | Zhang Zhilei; China | Chouaib Bouloudinat; Algeria |
| +91 kg | Roberto Cammarelle; Italy | Zhang Zhilei; China | Tomasz Duszak; Poland |

=== Judo ===
==== Men ====
| Event | Gold | Silver | Bronze |
|---|---|---|---|
| Openweight | Masaru Momose; Japan | Vladimirs Osnačs; Latvia | Jérôme Wustner; France |
| Openweight | Masaru Momose; Japan | Vladimirs Osnačs; Latvia | Yuki Deguchi; Japan |

==== Women ====
| Event | Gold | Silver | Bronze |
|---|---|---|---|
| Openweight | Qin Qian; China | Nodoka Shiraishi; Japan | Liu Huanyuan; China |
| Openweight | Qin Qian; China | Nodoka Shiraishi; Japan | Mei Fang; China |

=== Ju-jitsu ===
==== Men ====
| Event | Gold | Silver | Bronze |
|---|---|---|---|
| Duo | Italy; Zaccaria Vito; Michele Vallieri | Switzerland; Pascal Müller; Remo Müller | Romania; Doru Galan; Ionuţ Dobre |
| 62 kg | Pavel Korzhavikh; Russia | Zlatko Tsvetkov; Bulgaria | Francisco García; Spain |
| 69 kg | Yerlan Tleumbetov; Kazakhstan | Fedor Serov; Russia | Marco Baratti; Italy |
| 77 kg | Mario Staller; Germany | Nurlan Tleumbetov; Kazakhstan | Ivan Nastenko; Ukraine |
| 85 kg | Dmitry Nebolsin; Russia | Ali Smail; Algeria | Leonardo Sinchicay; Argentina |
| 94 kg | Thaer Odeh; Spain | Vedran Ikić; Croatia | Tomasz Szewczak; Poland |
| +94 kg | Frédéric Husson; France | Rob Haans; Netherlands | Egor Stepanov; Russia |

==== Women ====
| Event | Gold | Silver | Bronze |
|---|---|---|---|
| Duo | Romania; Genoveva Galan; Cătălina Mihalache | Switzerland; Antonia Erni; Alexandra Erni | Germany; Frauke Kühni; Stefanie Konop |
| 55 kg | Martyna Bierońska; Poland | Annabelle Reydy; France | Olga Pastushenko; Russia |
| 62 kg | Heleen Baars; Netherlands | Carina Neupert; Germany | Tamara Strnad; Slovenia |
| 70 kg | Sonja Kinz; Germany | Jeanne Rasmussen; Denmark | Lindsay Wyatt; Netherlands |
| +70 kg | Sarina Bleumink; Netherlands | Alla Paderina; Russia | Sabina Predovnik; Slovenia |

==== Mixed ====
| Event | Gold | Silver | Bronze |
|---|---|---|---|
| Duo | France; Nicolas Péréa; Aurore Péréa | Austria; Marcus Haider; Vera Bichler | Slovenia; Matic Derenda; Andrejka Ferenčak |

=== Karate ===
==== Men ====
| Event | Gold | Silver | Bronze |
|---|---|---|---|
| 60 kg | Danil Domdjoni; Croatia | Mohammad Reza Ghoroubi; Iran | Tsuneari Yahiro; Australia |
| 67 kg | Niyazi Aliyev; Azerbaijan | Dimitrios Triantafyllis; Greece | William Rollé; France |
| 75 kg | Saeid Farrokhi; Iran | Georgios Tzanos; Greece | Ko Matsuhisa; Japan |
| 84 kg | Enes Erkan; Turkey | Timothy Petersen; Netherlands | Hany Shakr; Egypt |
| +84 kg | Ibrahim Gary; France | Jonathan Horne; Germany | Stefano Maniscalco; Italy |

==== Women ====
| Event | Gold | Silver | Bronze |
|---|---|---|---|
| 50 kg | Gülderen Çelik; Turkey | Chen Yen-hui; Chinese Taipei | Li Hong; China |
| 55 kg | Jelena Kovačević; Croatia | Stella Urango; Colombia | Nataša Ilievska; Macedonia |
| 61 kg | Boutheina Hasnaoui; Tunisia | Elisa Au-Fonseca; United States | Alexandra Grande; Peru |
| 68 kg | Tiffany Fanjat; France | Cheryl Murphy; United States | Feng Lanlan; China |
| +68 kg | Shymaa Mohamed; Egypt | Jeanis Colzani; Brazil | Cristina Feo; Spain |

=== Kendo ===
==== Men ====
| Event | Gold | Silver | Bronze |
|---|---|---|---|
| Individual | Ryoichi Uchimura; Japan | Shoji Teramoto; Japan | Kim Min-Gyu; South Korea |
| Individual | Ryoichi Uchimura; Japan | Shoji Teramoto; Japan | Daisuke Wako; Japan |
| Special individual | Kazuo Furukawa; Japan | Shinji Funatsu; Japan | Park Hak-Jin; South Korea |
| Special individual | Kazuo Furukawa; Japan | Shinji Funatsu; Japan | Wu Tsung-shan; Chinese Taipei |

==== Women ====
| Event | Gold | Silver | Bronze |
|---|---|---|---|
| Individual | Yuka Kozuno; Japan | Jeon Ka-Hee; South Korea | Yukiko Takami; Japan |
| Individual | Yuka Kozuno; Japan | Jeon Ka-Hee; South Korea | Grace Lee; United States |
| Special individual | Chinatsu Murayama; Japan | Sachie Shojima; Japan | Wendy Robillard; Canada |
| Special individual | Chinatsu Murayama; Japan | Sachie Shojima; Japan | Saeko Tew; United States |

=== Kickboxing ===
==== Men ====
| Event | Gold | Silver | Bronze |
|---|---|---|---|
| Low kick 63.5 kg | Denis Lukashov; Russia | Fikri Arıcan; Turkey | Mihajlo Jovanović; Serbia |
| Low kick 67 kg | Shamil Abdulmedzhidov; Russia | Petar Živković; Serbia | Ezbiri Abdella; France |
| Low kick 71 kg | Parviz Abdullayev; Azerbaijan | Vladimir Tarasov; Russia | Tomasz Mordarski; Poland |
| Low kick 75 kg | Karim Ghajji; France | Alpay Kır; Turkey | Kanan Sadikhov; Azerbaijan |
| Low kick 81 kg | Evgeny Gubar; Russia | Bakari Tounkara; France | Miika Lumilampi; Finland |
| Semi contact 63 kg | Andrea Lucchese; Italy | Jason Doyle; Ireland | Richard Veres; Hungary |
| Semi contact 69 kg | Domenico De Marco; Italy | László Gambos; Hungary | Jason Daniels; Ireland |
| Semi contact 74 kg | Gregorio Di Leo; Italy | Nikos Memos; Greece | Tamás Imre; Hungary |
| Semi contact 79 kg | Robert McMenamey; Ireland | Zsolt Moradi; Hungary | Harald Schmidt; Germany |
| Semi contact 84 kg | Krisztián Jároszkievicz; Hungary | Michael Page; Great Britain | Roman Brundl; Austria |
| Full contact 63.5 kg | Kostyantyn Demoretskyi; Ukraine | Gábor Görbics; Hungary | Zalimkhan Aliev; Russia |
| Full contact 67 kg | Edmond Mebenga; France | Oleg Zaytsev; Russia | Jarkko Jussila; Finland |
| Full contact 71 kg | Nikolay Osobskiy; Ukraine | Christian Kvatningen; Norway | Sanjin Pol Vrgoč; Croatia |
| Full contact 75 kg | Yusup Magomedbekov; Russia | Andreas Lødrup; Norway | Azamat Nurpeissov; Kazakhstan |
| Full contact 81 kg | Igor Prykhodko; Ukraine | Karl Martin Richardsen; Norway | Mariusz Niziołek; Poland |

==== Women ====
| Event | Gold | Silver | Bronze |
|---|---|---|---|
| Low kick 56 kg | Eva Lišková; Czech Republic | Doris Köhler; Austria | Alicja Piecyk; Poland |
| Low kick 60 kg | Fatima Bokova; Russia | Barbara Plazzoli; Italy | Kinga Siwa; Poland |
| Semi contact 55 kg | Luisa Gullotti; Italy | Bianca Pfahringer; Austria | Eirin Dale; Norway |
| Semi contact 60 kg | Gloria De Bei; Italy | Ida Abrahamsen; Norway | Barbara Szendrei; Hungary |
| Full contact 56 kg | Tonje Sørlie; Norway | Valeria Iskhakova; Russia | Roxane Laszack; France |
| Full contact 60 kg | Thea Næss; Norway | Gözde Bayergi; Turkey | Séverine Guilpin; France |

=== Muaythai ===
==== Men ====
| Event | Gold | Silver | Bronze |
|---|---|---|---|
| 54 kg | Sattra Paleenaram; Thailand | Abderrahmane Zine; Morocco | Rıdvan Kurt; Turkey |
| 54 kg | Sattra Paleenaram; Thailand | Abderrahmane Zine; Morocco | Mohd Ali Yaakub; Malaysia |
| 57 kg | Igor Liubchenko; Ukraine | Witsanu Chankhunthod; Thailand | Wang Kang; China |
| 57 kg | Igor Liubchenko; Ukraine | Witsanu Chankhunthod; Thailand | Chris White; Australia |
| 63.5 kg | Panupan Tanjad; Thailand | Firdavsiy Kholmuratov; Uzbekistan | Garik Kalashyan; Russia |
| 63.5 kg | Panupan Tanjad; Thailand | Firdavsiy Kholmuratov; Uzbekistan | Martin Akhtar; Sweden |
| 67 kg | Jeerasak Inudom; Thailand | Michael Dicks; Great Britain | Igor Petrov; Russia |
| 67 kg | Jeerasak Inudom; Thailand | Michael Dicks; Great Britain | Soufiane Zridy; Morocco |
| 71 kg | Teerapong Dee; Thailand | Marcus Öberg; Sweden | Zhang Xiaolong; China |
| 71 kg | Teerapong Dee; Thailand | Marcus Öberg; Sweden | Artur Kyshenko; Ukraine |
| 75 kg | Artem Levin; Russia | Yodthanong Photirat; Thailand | Jesse Lacombe; Canada |
| 75 kg | Artem Levin; Russia | Yodthanong Photirat; Thailand | Vasyl Tereshonok; Ukraine |
| 81 kg | Simon Marcus; Canada | Artem Vakhitov; Russia | Dzmitry Abdulin; Belarus |
| 81 kg | Simon Marcus; Canada | Artem Vakhitov; Russia | Nurbolat Sengirov; Kazakhstan |
| 91 kg | Dzianis Hancharonak; Belarus | Wang Wenzhong; China | Tsotne Rogava; Ukraine |
| 91 kg | Dzianis Hancharonak; Belarus | Wang Wenzhong; China | Thor Hoopmann; Australia |

==== Women ====
| Event | Gold | Silver | Bronze |
|---|---|---|---|
| 51 kg | Eva Fernández; Spain | Özlem Şan; Turkey | Fatima Pinto; Norway |
| 51 kg | Eva Fernández; Spain | Özlem Şan; Turkey | Prakaidao Pramari; Thailand |
| 54 kg | Milja Heino; Finland | Misty Sutherland; Canada | Asmae Ouzari; Morocco |
| 54 kg | Milja Heino; Finland | Misty Sutherland; Canada | Diana Yakovleva; Ukraine |
| 60 kg | Valentina Shevchenko; Peru | Caley Lewis; Australia | Aicha El-Majydy; Morocco |
| 60 kg | Valentina Shevchenko; Peru | Caley Lewis; Australia | Ania Fucz; Germany |

=== Sambo ===
==== Men – Combat ====
| Event | Gold | Silver | Bronze |
|---|---|---|---|
| 74 kg | Bair Omoktuev; Russia | Rumen Dimitrov; Bulgaria | Sergej Grecicho; Lithuania |
| +100 kg | Janosch Stefan; Germany | Aleksander Emelianenko; Russia | Tadas Rimkevičius; Lithuania |

==== Men ====
| Event | Gold | Silver | Bronze |
|---|---|---|---|
| 68 kg | Damir Muhidov; Uzbekistan | Arman Sanserbin; Kazakhstan | Kim Kwang-Sub; South Korea |
| 90 kg | Akobir Kurbonov; Uzbekistan | Moysis Iliadis; Greece | Ivan Remarenco; Moldova |

==== Women ====
| Event | Gold | Silver | Bronze |
|---|---|---|---|
| 56 kg | Marianna Alieva; Russia | Kalina Stefanova; Bulgaria | Katsiaryna Prakapenka; Belarus |
| 64 kg | Ekaterina Onoprienko; Russia | Olena Sayko; Ukraine | Adriana Cherar; Romania |

=== Sumo ===
==== Men ====
| Event | Gold | Silver | Bronze |
|---|---|---|---|
| Lightweight | Nachyn Mongush; Russia | Rentsendorjiin Gantögs; Mongolia | Takashi Shimako; Japan |
| Middleweight | Ryo Ito; Japan | Katsuo Yoshida; Japan | Yevgen Kozlyatin; Ukraine |
| Heavyweight | Alan Karaev; Russia | Hiroaki Tanaka; Japan | Takashi Himeno; Japan |
| Openweight | Alan Karaev; Russia | Hiroaki Tanaka; Japan | Ulambayaryn Byambajav; Mongolia |

==== Women ====
| Event | Gold | Silver | Bronze |
|---|---|---|---|
| Lightweight | Anna Metodieva; Bulgaria | Nelli Vorobieva; Russia | Alina Boykova; Ukraine |
| Middleweight | Maryna Pryshchepa; Ukraine | Anna Aleksandrova; Russia | Maryna Maksymenko; Ukraine |
| Heavyweight | Anna Zhigalova; Russia | Olga Davydko; Ukraine | Yuka Ueta; Japan |
| Openweight | Olga Davydko; Ukraine | Svitlana Iaromka; Ukraine | Anna Zhigalova; Russia |

=== Taekwondo ===
==== Men ====
| Event | Gold | Silver | Bronze |
|---|---|---|---|
| 58 kg | Joel González; Spain | Guillermo Pérez; Mexico | Chutchawal Khawlaor; Thailand |
| 58 kg | Joel González; Spain | Guillermo Pérez; Mexico | Sherif Wasfy; Egypt |
| 68 kg | Son Tae-jin; South Korea | Reza Naderian; Iran | Huang Jiannan; China |
| 68 kg | Son Tae-jin; South Korea | Reza Naderian; Iran | Balla Dièye; Senegal |
| 80 kg | Masoud Hajji-Zavareh; Iran | Nicolás García; Spain | Mauro Sarmiento; Italy |
| 80 kg | Masoud Hajji-Zavareh; Iran | Nicolás García; Spain | Kim Joon-tae; South Korea |
| +80 kg | Leonardo Basile; Italy | Arman Chilmanov; Kazakhstan | Hu Yaxin; China |
| +80 kg | Leonardo Basile; Italy | Arman Chilmanov; Kazakhstan | Roman Kuznetsov; Russia |

==== Women ====
| Event | Gold | Silver | Bronze |
|---|---|---|---|
| 49 kg | Brigitte Yagüe; Spain | Buttree Puedpong; Thailand | Wu Jingyu; China |
| 49 kg | Brigitte Yagüe; Spain | Buttree Puedpong; Thailand | Yasmina Aziez; France |
| 57 kg | Tseng Pei-hua; Chinese Taipei | Bat-El Gatterer; Israel | Veronica Calabrese; Italy |
| 57 kg | Tseng Pei-hua; Chinese Taipei | Bat-El Gatterer; Israel | Hend Yasser; Egypt |
| 67 kg | Hwang Kyung-seon; South Korea | Petra Matijašević; Croatia | Chuang Chia-chia; Chinese Taipei |
| 67 kg | Hwang Kyung-seon; South Korea | Petra Matijašević; Croatia | Khaoula Ben Hamza; Tunisia |
| +67 kg | Bianca Walkden; Great Britain | Gwladys Épangue; France | An Sae-bom; South Korea |
| +67 kg | Bianca Walkden; Great Britain | Gwladys Épangue; France | María Espinoza; Mexico |

=== Wrestling ===
==== Men ====
| Event | Gold | Silver | Bronze |
|---|---|---|---|
| Belt 96 kg | Viktors Reško; Latvia | Kostiantyn Koptiev; Ukraine | Abdolvahed Mohammadi; Iran |
| Grappling 70 kg | Maciej Polok; Poland | Matthieu Husson; France | Tom LeCuyer; United States |
| Grappling 80 kg | David Pierre-Louis; France | Krzysztof Łukaszewicz; Poland | Sergii Sergiienko; Ukraine |
| Grappling 90 kg | Zbigniew Tyszka; Poland | Jose Ródenas; Spain | Lamberto Raffi; Italy |
| Pankration 70 kg | Oleksandr Vysotskyi; Ukraine | Mykhailo Lasiuchenko; Ukraine | Zhumageldy Zhetpisbayev; Kazakhstan |
| Pankration 80 kg | Andrey Koreshkov; Russia | Jon Friedland; United States | Vasyl Novikov; Ukraine |
| Pankration 90 kg | Mayindur Magomedov; Russia | Yauheni Aliantsevich; Belarus | Sergii Guziev; Ukraine |

==== Women ====
| Event | Gold | Silver | Bronze |
|---|---|---|---|
| Freestyle 48 kg | Sun Yanan; China | Yana Stadnik; Great Britain | Anna Łukasiak; Poland |
| Freestyle 55 kg | Brittanee Laverdure; Canada | Chikako Matsukawa; Japan | Liu Gui; China |
| Freestyle 63 kg | Olesya Zamula; Azerbaijan | Amberle Montgomery; United States | Yang Panpan; China |
| Freestyle 72 kg | Qin Xiaoqing; China | Hiroe Suzuki; Japan | Leah Callahan; Canada |
| Grappling 60 kg | Sheila Bird; Canada | Irena Preiss; Poland | Océane Talvard; France |

== Medal table ==
* Host nation (China)

| Rank | Nation | Gold | Silver | Bronze | Total |
|---|---|---|---|---|---|
| 1 | Russia | 18 | 11 | 10 | 39 |
| 2 | China* | 15 | 3 | 13 | 31 |
| 3 | Ukraine | 7 | 5 | 11 | 23 |
| 4 | France | 7 | 5 | 7 | 19 |
| 5 | Italy | 7 | 1 | 5 | 13 |
| 6 | Japan | 6 | 12 | 7 | 25 |
| 7 | Thailand | 4 | 3 | 2 | 9 |
| 8 | Spain | 4 | 2 | 2 | 8 |
| 9 | Iran | 3 | 4 | 2 | 9 |
| 10 | Poland | 3 | 2 | 10 | 15 |
| 11 | Germany | 3 | 2 | 3 | 8 |
| 12 | Canada | 3 | 1 | 3 | 7 |
| 13 | Azerbaijan | 3 | 0 | 1 | 4 |
| 14 | Turkey | 2 | 5 | 2 | 9 |
| 15 | Norway | 2 | 4 | 2 | 8 |
| 16 | Croatia | 2 | 2 | 1 | 5 |
| 16 | Netherlands | 2 | 2 | 1 | 5 |
| 18 | South Korea | 2 | 1 | 5 | 8 |
| 19 | Romania | 2 | 1 | 3 | 6 |
| 20 | Uzbekistan | 2 | 1 | 0 | 3 |
| 21 | Egypt | 2 | 0 | 5 | 7 |
| 22 | Macau | 2 | 0 | 1 | 3 |
| 23 | Hungary | 1 | 3 | 3 | 7 |
| 23 | Kazakhstan | 1 | 3 | 3 | 7 |
| 25 | Bulgaria | 1 | 3 | 0 | 4 |
| 25 | Great Britain | 1 | 3 | 0 | 4 |
| 27 | Hong Kong | 1 | 2 | 0 | 3 |
| 28 | Belarus | 1 | 1 | 2 | 4 |
| 28 | Chinese Taipei | 1 | 1 | 2 | 4 |
| 30 | Ireland | 1 | 1 | 1 | 3 |
| 30 | Kyrgyzstan | 1 | 1 | 1 | 3 |
| 32 | Latvia | 1 | 1 | 0 | 2 |
| 33 | Finland | 1 | 0 | 2 | 3 |
| 33 | Indonesia | 1 | 0 | 2 | 3 |
| 33 | Moldova | 1 | 0 | 2 | 3 |
| 36 | Czech Republic | 1 | 0 | 1 | 2 |
| 36 | Peru | 1 | 0 | 1 | 2 |
| 36 | Tunisia | 1 | 0 | 1 | 2 |
| 39 | Pakistan | 1 | 0 | 0 | 1 |
| 40 | United States | 0 | 4 | 3 | 7 |
| 41 | Greece | 0 | 4 | 0 | 4 |
| 42 | Austria | 0 | 3 | 1 | 4 |
| 43 | Lithuania | 0 | 2 | 3 | 5 |
| 43 | Malaysia | 0 | 2 | 3 | 5 |
| 45 | Switzerland | 0 | 2 | 1 | 3 |
| 46 | Algeria | 0 | 1 | 3 | 4 |
| 46 | Australia | 0 | 1 | 3 | 4 |
| 46 | Morocco | 0 | 1 | 3 | 4 |
| 49 | Tajikistan | 0 | 1 | 2 | 3 |
| 50 | Brazil | 0 | 1 | 1 | 2 |
| 50 | Dominican Republic | 0 | 1 | 1 | 2 |
| 50 | Jordan | 0 | 1 | 1 | 2 |
| 50 | Mexico | 0 | 1 | 1 | 2 |
| 50 | Mongolia | 0 | 1 | 1 | 2 |
| 50 | Serbia | 0 | 1 | 1 | 2 |
| 50 | Sweden | 0 | 1 | 1 | 2 |
| 50 | Wales | 0 | 1 | 1 | 2 |
| 58 | Colombia | 0 | 1 | 0 | 1 |
| 58 | Denmark | 0 | 1 | 0 | 1 |
| 58 | Israel | 0 | 1 | 0 | 1 |
| 61 | Slovenia | 0 | 0 | 3 | 3 |
| 62 | Argentina | 0 | 0 | 1 | 1 |
| 62 | Macedonia | 0 | 0 | 1 | 1 |
| 62 | Senegal | 0 | 0 | 1 | 1 |
| 62 | Singapore | 0 | 0 | 1 | 1 |
| Totals (65 entries) | | 118 | 118 | 154 | 390 |
