= Wushu at the World Combat Games =

Wushu has been contested at the World Combat Games since 2010.

== Editions ==
Games	Year	Host city	Best Nation
I	2010	(China) Beijing	China
II	2013	(Russia) Saint Petersburg	China
III	2023	(Saudi Arabia) Riyadh	China

== Medal table ==
Rank	Nation	Gold	Silver	Bronze	Total
1	China (CHN)	20	3	1	24
2	Iran (IRI)	6	6	2	14
3	Russia (RUS)	5	4	3	12
4	Macau (MAC)	3	2	1	6
5	Indonesia (INA)	2	2	2	6
6	Egypt (EGY)	2	1	3	6
7	Hong Kong (HKG)	1	3	5	9
8	Malaysia (MAS)	1	3	4	8
9	South Korea (KOR)	1	0	1	2
10	Chinese Taipei (TPE)	1	0	0	1
10	Morocco (MAR)	1	0	0	1
10	Nepal (NEP)	1	0	0	1
13	France (FRA)	0	4	1	5
14	Japan (JPN)	0	3	0	3
15	Brazil (BRA)	0	2	2	4
15	Philippines (PHI)	0	2	2	4
17	Saudi Arabia (KSA)	0	1	3	4
17	Singapore (SGP)	0	1	3	4
19	Turkey (TUR)	0	1	2	3
20	Canada (CAN)	0	1	0	1
20	Romania (ROU)	0	1	0	1
20	Ukraine (UKR)	0	1	0	1
20	Uzbekistan (UZB)	0	1	0	1
24	Venezuela (VEN)	0	0	3	3
25	Lebanon (LBN)	0	0	2	2
25	Switzerland (SUI)	0	0	2	2
27	Algeria (ALG)	0	0	1	1
27	Azerbaijan (AZE)	0	0	1	1
27	India (IND)	0	0	1	1
27	Jordan (JOR)	0	0	1	1
27	Kazakhstan (KAZ)	0	0	1	1
27	Mexico (MEX)	0	0	1	1
27	Tunisia (TUN)	0	0	1	1
27	United States (USA)	0	0	1	1
Totals (34 entries)		44	42	50	136
