= Judo at the World Combat Games =

Judo competition

- Current event or competition: Judo at the 2023 World Combat Games

Competition details
- Discipline: Judo

History
- First edition: Beijing 2010
- Editions: 3
- Most recent: Saint Petersburg 2013

== List of tournaments ==
Year	Date	City and host country	Venue	Competition		# Countries	# Athletes	Ref.
Year	Date	City and host country	Venue	♂	♀	# Countries	# Athletes	Ref.
2010	28–29 August	Beijing, China		●	●			
2013	19–20 October	Saint Petersburg, Russia	Saint Petersburg Sports and Concert Complex	●	●	16		
2023	23 October	Riyadh, Saudi Arabia						
