= All-time World Combat Games medal table =

World Combat medal table

An all-time World Combat Games medal table from 2010 World Combat Games to 2013 World Combat Games.

== Medal table ==
Rank	Nation	Gold	Silver	Bronze	Total
1	Russia	65	31	36	132
2	Ukraine	32	38	40	110
3	China	24	10	20	54
4	France	19	13	16	48
5	Japan	17	17	11	45
6	Italy	14	15	15	44
7	Kazakhstan	13	16	28	57
8	Saudi Arabia	12	20	19	51
9	Individual Neutral Athletes	11	4	3	18
10	Iran	9	8	9	26
11	Thailand	7	5	4	16
12	Azerbaijan	6	1	3	10
13	Poland	5	3	18	26
14	Hungary	4	7	4	15
15	Germany	4	5	6	15
16	Spain	4	5	2	11
17	Norway	4	4	2	10
18	Brazil	4	3	7	14
19	Croatia	4	3	3	10
20	Egypt	4	1	9	14
21	Turkey	3	7	9	19
22	Romania	3	4	8	15
23	Great Britain	3	4	2	9
24	Canada	3	3	7	13
25	South Korea	3	2	7	12
26	Netherlands	3	2	3	8
27	Ireland	3	2	2	7
27	Uzbekistan	3	2	2	7
29	Belarus	2	3	5	10
30	South Africa	2	1	8	11
31	Kyrgyzstan	2	1	6	9
32	Mexico	2	1	2	5
33	Indonesia	2	0	2	4
34	Macau	2	0	1	3
34	Peru	2	0	1	3
36	United States	1	8	13	22
37	Bulgaria	1	5	5	11
38	Mongolia	1	4	3	8
39	Austria	1	4	1	6
40	Hong Kong	1	3	5	9
40	Serbia	1	3	5	9
42	Sweden	1	3	4	8
43	Lithuania	1	2	4	7
44	Israel	1	2	2	5
45	Latvia	1	2	0	3
46	Chinese Taipei	1	1	3	5
46	Moldova	1	1	3	5
48	Estonia	1	1	0	2
49	Finland	1	0	5	6
49	Venezuela	1	0	5	6
51	Tunisia	1	0	2	3
52	Belgium	1	0	1	2
52	Czech Republic	1	0	1	2
54	Bosnia and Herzegovina	1	0	0	1
54	Pakistan	1	0	0	1
56	Greece	0	4	1	5
57	Malaysia	0	3	4	7
58	Switzerland	0	3	1	4
59	Mixed-NOCs	0	3	0	3
60	Australia	0	2	5	7
60	Morocco	0	2	5	7
62	Jordan	0	2	3	5
63	Colombia	0	2	2	4
64	Denmark	0	2	0	2
64	Republic of the Congo	0	2	0	2
66	Slovenia	0	1	5	6
67	Algeria	0	1	4	5
68	Tajikistan	0	1	2	3
69	Dominican Republic	0	1	1	2
69	Vietnam	0	1	1	2
69	Wales	0	1	1	2
72	Armenia	0	1	0	1
73	Argentina	0	0	2	2
73	Lebanon	0	0	2	2
73	Singapore	0	0	2	2
76	Cuba	0	0	1	1
76	Georgia	0	0	1	1
76	India	0	0	1	1
76	Kuwait	0	0	1	1
76	Mauritius	0	0	1	1
76	New Zealand	0	0	1	1
76	North Macedonia	0	0	1	1
76	Senegal	0	0	1	1
76	Trinidad and Tobago	0	0	1	1
76	Yemen	0	0	1	1
Totals (85 entries)		320	312	433	1,065

== See also ==
- World Combat Games
