= Javier García (jujutsuka) =

Spanish martial artist

Personal information
- Full name: Francisco (Fco.) Javier García Fernández
- Nickname: Javi
- National team: Spain
- Born: August 9, 1974 (age 51) Madrid, Spain

Sport
- Sport: Fighting Ju-jitsu
- Weight class: 62 kg
- Club: Club Víctor Pradera Leganés; Club Katán Tres Cantos
Medal record
Men's sport ju-jitsu
Representing Spain
World Combat Games
Bronze medal – third place	2010 Beijing	Fighting -62 kg
Silver medal – second place	2013 St. Petersburg	Fighting -62 kg
Silver medal – second place	2013 St. Petersburg	Duo Classic
World Championships
Gold medal – first place	2002 Punta del Este	Fighting -62 kg
Gold medal – first place	2004 Móstoles	Fighting -62 kg
Silver medal – second place	2006 Rotterdam	Fighting -62 kg
Silver medal – second place	2008 Malmö	Fighting -62 kg
Silver medal – second place	2011 Cali	Fighting -62 kg
Silver medal – second place	2012 Vienna	Fighting -62 kg
European Championships
Bronze medal – third place	2001 Geneva	Fighting -62 kg
Bronze medal – third place	2005 Wroclaw	Fighting -62 kg
Bronze medal – third place	2007 Turin	Fighting -62 kg
Gold medal – first place	2009 Podgorica	Fighting -62 kg
Bronze medal – third place	2013 Walldorf	Fighting -62 kg
Gold medal – first place	2015 Almere	Fighting -62 kg
- Updated on 1 december 2019

Francisco Javier García Fernández (born 9 August 1974) is a Spanish martial artist who represented his native country Spain in sport jujitsu. He is the most decorated Spanish jutsuka, a two time World and European champion in discipline fighting systems, -62 kg weight category. He was practising jujitsu mostly at Tres Cantos near Madrid in the Club Katán. He retired from topsport in 2015 after winning second European in Almere title at age of 41.
