= Frédéric Husson =

French martial artist (born 1976)

- Born: Frédéric Gervais Husson; December 5, 1976 (age 49)
- Nationality: French
- Division: +94 kg
- Style: Fighting Ju-jitsu; Brazilian Jiu-jitsu; Judo
- Trainer: Eugène Domagata; Fernand Capizzi

Other information
- Notable club: AM le Plessis Trevise
- Last updated on: 30 November 2019

Frédéric Gervais Husson (born 5 December 1976) is a French martial artist who represents his native country France in sport jujitsu (JJIF).

== Career ==
He grew up at suburb of Paris at Le Plessis-Trévise where he began with judo aged eight. As teenager he preferred playing basketball and he returned to martial arts kind of sport at university around of age 21. Since 2001 he had been part of French national sport jujitsu team. His main discipline was fighting system where he is three times individual world champion – 2004, 2006, 2011. Since 2011 he is preferring discipline Brazilian jiu-jitsu whiche is part of JJIF championships since same year as Ne-waza (Jiu-jitsu).

=== Results ===
World Games (IWGA + JJIF)
| Year | Place | Medal | Discipline | Category |
|---|---|---|---|---|
| 2017 | Wrocław (Poland) | Silver | Ne-waza (Jiu-jitsu) | +94 kg |
World Combat Games (GAISF + JJIF)
| 2010 | Beijing (China) | Gold | Fighting System | +94 kg |
Ju-Jitsu World Championships (JJIF)
| 2002 | Punta del Este (Uruguay) | Silver | Fighting System | +94 kg |
| 2004 | Móstoles (Spain) | Gold | Fighting System | +94 kg |
| 2006 | Rotterdam (Netherlands) | Gold | Fighting System | +94 kg |
| 2008 | Malmö (Sweden) | Bronze | Fighting System | +94 kg |
| 2010 | Saint Petersburg (Russia) | Bronze | Fighting System | +94 kg |
| 2011 | Cali (Colombia) | Gold | Fighting System | +94 kg |
| 2011 | Cali (Colombia) | Gold | Ne-waza (Jiu-jitsu) | +85 kg |
| 2015 | Bangkok (Thailand) | Silver | Ne-waza (Jiu-jitsu) | +94 kg |
| 2016 | Wrocław (Poland) | Bronze | Ne-waza (Jiu-jitsu) | +94 kg |
| 2019 | Abu Dhabi (United Arab Emirates) | Bronze | Ne-waza (Jiu-jitsu) | +94 kg |
Ju-Jitsu European Championships (JJEU + JJIF)
| 2001 | Geneva (Italy) | Bronze | Fighting System | +94 kg |
| 2003 | Hanau (Germany) | Gold | Fighting System | +94 kg |
| 2005 | Wrocław (Poland) | Gold | Fighting System | +94 kg |
| 2007 | Turin (Italy) | Bronze | Fighting System | +94 kg |
| 2009 | Podgorica (Montenegro) | Gold | Fighting System | +94 kg |
| 2011 | Maribor (Slovenia) | Gold | Fighting System | +94 kg |
| 2015 | Almere (Netherlands) | Gold | Ne-waza (Jiu-jitsu) | +94 kg |
| 2018 | Gliwice (Poland) | Silver | Ne-waza (Jiu-jitsu) | +94 kg |
