= Danny Dignum =

English boxer (born 1992)

Personal information
- Born: 17 March 1992 (age 34) Essex, England
- Height: 6 ft 1 in (185 cm)
- Weight: Middleweight

Boxing career
- Stance: Southpaw

Boxing record
- Total fights: 19
- Wins: 16
- Win by KO: 9
- Losses: 2
- Draws: 1
Medal record
Men's amateur boxing
Representing Great Britain
World Combat Games
Bronze medal – third place	2013 St. Petersburg	Light-heavyweight

Danny Dignum (born 17 March 1992) is an English professional boxer who held the WBO European middleweight title from 2019 to 2023. He also challenged future unified middleweight champion Janibek Alimkhanuly for the vacant WBO interim middleweight title in 2023. As an amateur, he won a bronze medal at the 2013 World Combat Games.

== Early life ==
Danny Dignum was born on 17 March 1992 in Essex, England. He attended St. Margaret's primary school in his home town of Bowers Gifford before attending The Appleton School in South Benfleet. He worked alongside his dad and twin brother as a tarmacer and concreter before taking up boxing full time. After his parents became fed up of he and his twin brother fighting, both began boxing at the age of nine on their father's suggestion.

== Amateur career ==
During a career in which he had around 85 fights with approximately 70 wins, he won the 2012 ABA Championships, a bronze medal at the 2013 World Combat Games and competed at the 2014 European Union Championships as part of the GB Boxing team.

== Professional career ==
Dignum made his professional debut on 26 November 2016, scoring a second-round technical knockout (TKO) victory over Jimmy White at the Wembley Arena in London.

After compiling a record of 11–0 (5 KOs) he faced Conrad Cummings for the vacant WBO European middleweight title on 9 November 2019 at the York Hall in London. In a fight which saw Cummings receive a point deduction in the second round for repeated use of his elbow and suffer a cut in the fourth from an accidental head clash, Dignum captured the WBO European title via fifth-round TKO after referee Howard Foster stopped the contest to save Cummings from further punishment. He successfully defended the title four months later on 7 March 2020, defeating Alfredo Meli via ninth-round TKO at the Brentwood Centre in Brentwood, Essex. Dignum dropped Meli three times with punches to the body – once in the seventh, again in the eighth and for the final time in the ninth – prompting Meli's corner to throw in the towel as the referee called a halt to the contest.

== Professional boxing record ==
19 fights	16 wins	2 losses
By knockout	9	2
By decision	7	0
Draws	1	

No.	Result	Record	Opponent	Type	Round, time	Date	Location	Notes
19	Loss	16–2–1	Denzel Bentley	TKO	2	11 May 2024	York Hall, London, England	For vacant WBO international middleweight title
18	Win	16–1–1	Lukasz Maciec	PTS	8	14 Apr 2023	York Hall, London, England	
17	Win	15–1–1	Dustin Ammann	TKO	3 (6), 1:32	17 Mar 2023	Brentwood Centre, Brentwood, England	
16	Loss	14–1–1	Janibek Alimkhanuly	KO	2 (12), 2:11	21 May 2022	Resorts World Event Center, Las Vegas, Nevada, U.S.	For vacant WBO interim middleweight title
15	Win	14–0–1	Grant Dennis	TKO	6 (10), 2:31	11 Feb 2022	York Hall, London, England	Retained WBO European middleweight title
14	Draw	13–0–1	Andrey Sirotkin	SD	10	17 Apr 2021	Whites Hotel, Bolton, England	Retained WBO European middleweight title
13	Win	13–0	Alfredo Meli	TKO	9 (10), 0:39	7 Mar 2020	Brentwood Centre, Brentwood, England	Retained WBO European middleweight title
12	Win	12–0	Conrad Cummings	TKO	5 (10), 0:21	9 Nov 2019	York Hall, London, England	Won vacant WBO European middleweight title
11	Win	11–0	Rafał Jackiewicz	PTS	8	11 May 2019	Brentwood Centre, Brentwood, England	
10	Win	10–0	Gianni Antoh	PTS	4	9 Mar 2019	Brentwood Centre, Brentwood, England	
9	Win	9–0	Alistair Warren	KO	3 (6), 1:56	14 Dec 2018	York Hall, London, England	
8	Win	8–0	Danny Shannon	TKO	4 (6), 1:25	21 Sep 2018	Brentwood Centre, Brentwood, England	
7	Win	7–0	Konstantin Alexandrov	TKO	2 (4), 2:39	13 Jul 2018	York Hall, London, England	
6	Win	6–0	Anthony Fox	PTS	6	6 Jun 2018	York Hall, London, England	
5	Win	5–0	Darryl Sharp	PTS	4	3 Feb 2018	The O2 Arena, London, England	
4	Win	4–0	Lewis van Poetsch	PTS	4	1 Sep 2017	York Hall, London, England	
3	Win	3–0	Yailton Neves	PTS	4	1 Jul 2017	The O2 Arena, London, England	
2	Win	2–0	Iain Jackson	TKO	2 (4), 1:41	17 Mar 2017	York Hall, London, England	
1	Win	1–0	Jimmy White	TKO	2 (4), 0:56	26 Nov 2016	Wembley Arena, London, England	
