= Sergey Lipinets =

Russian boxer (born 1989)

Sergey Lipinets Сергей Липинец
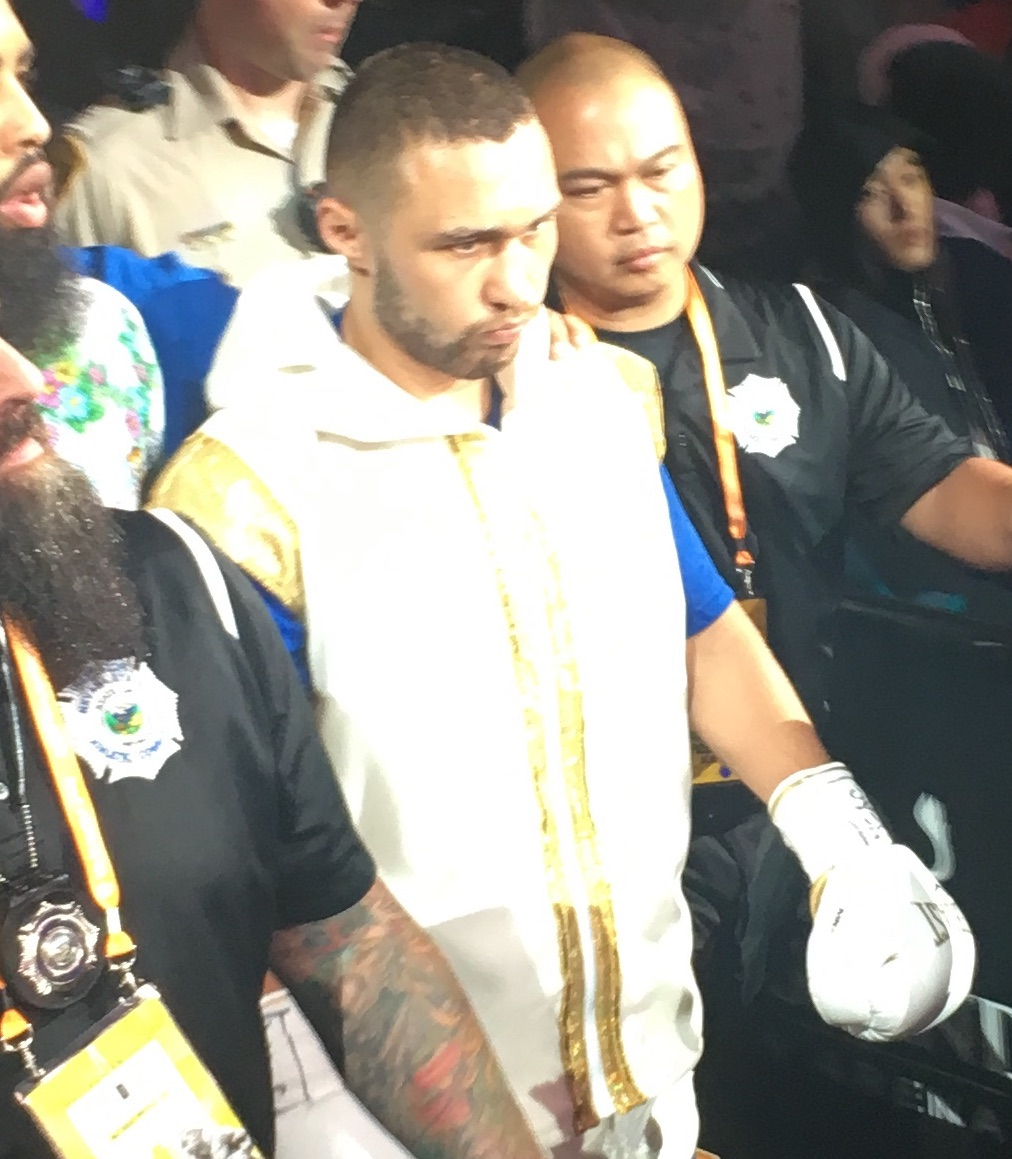
- Lipinets in 2019

Personal information
- Nickname: Samurai
- Nationality: Russian
- Born: 23 March 1989 (age 37) Martuk, Kazakh SSR, Soviet Union (now Kazakhstan)
- Height: 170 cm (5 ft 7 in)
- Weight: Light-welterweight; Welterweight

Boxing career
- Reach: 170 cm (67 in)
- Stance: Orthodox

Boxing record
- Total fights: 24
- Wins: 19
- Win by KO: 14
- Losses: 5
- Draws: 1

Sergey Alekseyevich Lipinets (Russian: Сергей Алексеевич Липинец; born 23 March 1989) is a Russian professional boxer and former kickboxer who held the IBF light-welterweight title from 2017 to 2018.

== Early life and kickboxing career ==
Lipinets was born in Martuk, Kazakhstan, but moved to Russia at the age of 9. Lipinets originally competed as a kickboxer, medaling in competitions like the 2012 W.A.K.O. European Championships and the 2013 World Combat Games.

== Professional boxing career ==
After a brief amateur boxing career in which he went 35–5, Lipinets turned pro in 2014.

=== Lipinets vs. Zappavigna ===
After winning 10 pro bouts, Lipinets faced Lenny Zappavigna in an IBF eliminator. The winner would become the mandatory challenger to the IBF champion, the winner of an April 2017 bout between Ricky Burns and Julius Indongo. Lipinets proved to be too much for Zappavigna, as the latter went down during round 5 before being counted out following a right straight from Lipinets in round 8. Both fighters suffered several cuts during the fight.

Following Indongo's win over Burns, Lipinets tried to start negotiations with the IBF champion. However, the IBF granted Indongo an exception to allow him to unify all the major light welterweight titles against Terence Crawford. After Crawford's win over Indongo, the IBF ordered Crawford to defend his title against Lipinets. Lipinets stated that the IBF title was "stolen from him". As Crawford didn't plan to return to the ring before the IBF's deadline, he vacated the IBF title just 11 days after defeating Indongo.

=== Lipinets vs. Kondo ===
The IBF ordered Lipinets to face Akihiro Kondo for their vacant title. The fight was finalized for 4 November on the undercard of a Deontay Wilder bout. The event was televised on Showtime. Lipinets became the IBF champion, winning by unanimous decision (118–110, 117–111, 117–111). The decision was booed upon being announced but several media outlets scored it for Lipinets, albeit on closer cards. Lipinets connected to Kondo's body often throughout the fight, but Kondo remained unfazed by the body shots. Kondo kept coming forward and rocked Lipinets in round 5. Lipinets was cut by an accidental head clash midway through the fight.

=== Lipinets vs. Clayton ===
On 24 October 2020, Lipinets faced Custio Clayton who was ranked #4 by the WBO, #5 by the IBF and #10 by the WBA. The bout ended in a majority draw, with two of the judges scoring the fight 114-114, 114-114, while the third judge saw Clayton as the winner scoring it 115-113 in his favor.

=== Lipinets vs. Ennis ===
In his next bout, Lipinets fought Jaron Ennis, ranked #7 by the WBO, #9 by the IBF and #12 by the WBC at welterweight. Despite catching Ennis a few times, Lipinets was mostly overmatched in the bout and lost the fight via sixth round KO.

== Titles and accomplishments ==
=== Kickboxing ===
Professional

- WAKO-Pro Full Contact World -64.5 kg Champion

Amateur

- World Association of Kickboxing Organizations
  - 2011 WAKO World Championships in Dublin Full Contact -63.5 kg (silver)
  - 2012 WAKO European Championships in Bucharest Full Contact -63.5 kg (gold)
  - 2012 WAKO World Cup Bestfighter in Rimini Full Contact -63.5 kg (bronze)
  - 2013 WAKO World Championships in Antalya Full Contact -63.5 kg (gold)
- World Combat Games
  - 2013 World Combat Games Full Contact -63.5 kg (silver)

== Professional boxing record ==
25 fights	19 wins	5 losses
By knockout	14	2
By decision	5	3
Draws	1	

No.	Result	Record	Opponent	Type	Round, time	Date	Location	Notes
25	Win	19-5-1	Mark Urvanov	TKO	3 (4), 1:44	Nov 6 2026	Basket-Hall Arena, Kazan, Russia	
24	Loss	18–5–1	Arthur Biyarslanov	UD	10	30 Oct 2025	Montreal Casino, Quebec, Canada	For NABF light-welterweight title
23	Loss	18–4–1	Adam Azim	TKO	9 (12), 0:33	1 Feb 2025	Wembley Arena, London, England	For vacant IBO light welterweight title
22	Win	18–3–1	Robbie Davies Jr.	UD	10	8 May 2024	ProBox TV Events Center, Plant City, Florida, U.S.	
21	Loss	17–3–1	Michel Rivera	UD	10	25 Nov 2023	Michelob Ultra Arena, Las Vegas, Nevada, U.S.	
20	Win	17–2–1	Omar Figueroa Jr.	RTD	8 (12), 3:00	20 Aug 2022	Seminole Hard Rock Hotel & Casino, Hollywood, Florida, U.S.	
19	Loss	16–2–1	Jaron Ennis	KO	6 (12), 2:33	10 Apr 2021	Mohegan Sun Arena, Montville, Connecticut, US	
18	Draw	16–1–1	Custio Clayton	MD	12	24 Oct 2020	Mohegan Sun Arena, Montville, Connecticut, US	For IBF interim welterweight title
17	Win	16–1	Jayar Inson	TKO	2 (10), 0:57	20 Jul 2019	MGM Grand Garden Arena, Paradise, Nevada, US	
16	Win	15–1	Lamont Peterson	TKO	10 (12), 2:59	24 Mar 2019	MGM National Harbor, Oxon Hill, Maryland, US	
15	Win	14–1	Erick Bone	MD	10	4 Aug 2018	Nassau Coliseum, Uniondale, New York, US	
14	Loss	13–1	Mikey Garcia	UD	12	10 Mar 2018	Freeman Coliseum, San Antonio, Texas, US	Lost IBF light-welterweight title
13	Win	13–0	Akihiro Kondo	UD	12	4 Nov 2017	Barclays Center, Brooklyn, New York, US	Won vacant IBF light-welterweight title
12	Win	12–0	Clarence Booth	TKO	7 (8), 1:33	4 Mar 2017	Barclays Center, Brooklyn, New York, US	
11	Win	11–0	Leonardo Zappavigna	KO	8 (12), 1:23	10 Dec 2016	Galen Center, Los Angeles, California, US	
10	Win	10–0	Walter Castillo	TKO	7 (10), 2:45	15 Jul 2016	Horseshoe Casino, Tunica, Mississippi, US	
9	Win	9–0	Levan Ghvamichava	KO	5 (10), 1:40	15 Mar 2016	Robinson Rancheria Resort & Casino, Nice, California, US	
8	Win	8–0	Haskell Rhodes	UD	10	30 Oct 2015	The Venue at UCF, Orlando, Florida, US	
7	Win	7–0	Kendal Mena	TKO	3 (8), 1:40	8 Jul 2015	B.B. King Blues Club & Grill, New York, New York, US	
6	Win	6–0	Cosme Rivera	TKO	9 (10), 2:59	13 Mar 2015	A La Carte Event Pavilion, Tampa, Florida, US	Won vacant WBC Latino light-welterweight title
5	Win	5–0	Ernie Sanchez	KO	8 (10), 0:48	28 Nov 2014	Luzhniki Palace of Sports, Moscow, Russia	Won vacant WBC International Silver light-welterweight title
4	Win	4–0	Daniel Lomeli	TKO	7 (8), 1:45	27 Sep 2014	Krylatskoye Sports Palace, Moscow, Russia	
3	Win	3–0	Rynell Griffin	KO	3 (6), 2:36	18 Jul 2014	Quiet Cannon, Montebello, California, US	
2	Win	2–0	Dzemil Cosovic	KO	4 (6), 1:52	30 May 2014	Luzhniki Palace of Sports, Moscow, Russia	
1	Win	1–0	Franklin Varela	UD	6	25 Apr 2014	Krylatskoye Sports Palace, Moscow, Russia	

== Kickboxing record ==
Professional Kickboxing record
Date	Result	Opponent	Event	Location	Method	Round	Time
2012-10-20	Win	(Russia) Rasul Kachakaev	Grand Prix Russia Open	Moscow, Russia	KO (Left Hook)	1	
2012-08-	Win	(Ukraine) Maxim Kolpak		Russia	Decision	3	3:00
2012-03-03	Win	(France) Mickael Lacombe	Full Contact International Gala	Montceau-les-Mines, France	KO	4	
Wins the vacant WAKO-Pro Full Contact World -64.5kg title.
2011-12-21	Win	(Russia) Sergey Popa		Moscow, Russia	TKO	1	
2011-05-28	Win	(Russia) Vitaly Lisnyak	Grand Prix Russia Open	Moscow, Russia	Decision	3	3:00
2010-11-27	Win	(Russia) Alexey Radik		Moscow, Russia	Decision (Unanimous)	5	3:00
2009-05-21	Loss	(Ukraine) Serhiy Adamchuk	BARS: Russia vs Ukraine	Russia, Moscow	KO	2	
Legend: Win Loss Draw/No contest Notes

Amateur Kickboxing record
Date	Result	Opponent	Event	Location	Method	Round	Time
2013-12-08	Win	(Azerbaijan) Elnur Daryagir	2013 WAKO World Championships, Final	Antalya, Turkey	Decision	3	2:00
Wins the 2013 WAKO World Championships Full Contact -63.5kg Gold Medal.
2013-12-07	Win	(Kyrgyzstan) Aibek Duishembiev	2013 WAKO World Championships, Semi Final	Antalya, Turkey	Decision	3	2:00
2013-12-05	Win	(Norway) Milton Galarreta	2013 WAKO World Championships, Quarter Final	Antalya, Turkey	TKO	2	
2013-12-04	Win	(Spain) Andoni Iglesias	2013 WAKO World Championships, 1/8 Final	Antalya, Turkey	Decision	3	2:00
2013-10-25	Loss	(Hungary) Gabor Gorbics	2013 World Combat Games, Final	Saint Petersburg, Russia	Decision (Unanimous)	3	2:00
Wins the 2013 World Combat Games Full Contact -63.5kg Silver Medal.
2013-10-23	Win	(France) William Saidi	2013 World Combat Games, Semi Final	Saint Petersburg, Russia	Decision (Unanimous)	3	2:00
2013-10-21	Win	(Ukraine) Konstyantyn Demoretsky	2013 World Combat Games, Quarter Final	Saint Petersburg, Russia	Decision (Unanimous)	3	2:00
2012-12-01	Win	(Hungary) Gabor Garbics	2012 WAKO European Championships, Final	Bucharest, Romania	Decision (Unanimous)	3	2:00
Wins the 2012 WAKO World European Full Contact -63.5kg Gold Medal.
2012-11-30	Win		2012 WAKO European Championships, Semi Final	Bucharest, Romania	Decision (Unanimous)	3	2:00
2011-11-	Loss	(Ukraine) Konstyantyn Demoretsky	2011 WAKO World Championships, Final	Dublin, Ireland	Decision (Majority)	3	2:00
Wins the 2011 WAKO World Championships Full Contact -63.5kg Silver Medal.
2011-11-	Win		2011 WAKO World Championships, Semi Final	Dublin, Ireland	Decision (Majority)	3	2:00
Legend: Win Loss Draw/No contest Notes

== See also ==
- List of light-welterweight boxing champions

Sporting positions
World boxing titles
Vacant Title last held by Terence Crawford	IBF light-welterweight champion 4 November 2017 – 10 March 2018	Succeeded by Mikey Garcia
