= Savate at the 2013 World Combat Games =

Savate, for the 2013 World Combat Games, took place at the Sports Complex 'Yubileiny' Hall 2, in Saint Petersburg, Russia. The medals were awarded on the 20 and 22 October 2013. Also, these Games marked the debut of this sport because it was not contested in the inaugural 2010 WCG. This sport was demonstrated at the 1924 Summer Olympics in Paris.

== Medal table ==
Key:

* Host nation (Russia)

Rank	Nation	Gold	Silver	Bronze	Total
1	France (FRA)	8	2	0	10
2	Russia (RUS)*	1	1	3	5
2	Serbia (SRB)	1	1	3	5
4	Croatia (CRO)	1	1	2	4
5	Congo (CGO)	0	2	0	2
6	Italy (ITA)	0	1	3	4
7	Ukraine (UKR)	0	1	2	3
8	Hungary (HUN)	0	1	0	1
8	Slovenia (SLO)	0	1	0	1
10	Canada (CAN)	0	0	3	3
11	China (CHN)	0	0	2	2
12	Germany (GER)	0	0	1	1
12	Iran (IRI)	0	0	1	1
12	Morocco (MAR)	0	0	1	1
12	Romania (ROU)	0	0	1	1
Totals (15 entries)		11	11	22	44

== Medal summary ==
=== Men ===
Event	Gold	Silver	Bronze
Canne de Combat	Benjamin Laurent Olivier Latt (FRA)	Peter Kristof Nyilasy (HUN)	Mathieu Paquette (CAN)
Canne de Combat	Benjamin Laurent Olivier Latt (FRA)	Peter Kristof Nyilasy (HUN)	Thomas Horstmeyer (GER)
Combat 60 kg	Jonathan Bonnet (FRA)	Victor Slavinskyi (UKR)	Liang Yang (CHN)
Combat 60 kg	Jonathan Bonnet (FRA)	Victor Slavinskyi (UKR)	Predrag Simunec (CRO)
Combat 65 kg	Laurent Crescence (FRA)	Boris Joevin Essere (CGO)	Alexandru Nita (ROU)
Combat 65 kg	Laurent Crescence (FRA)	Boris Joevin Essere (CGO)	Ruslan Abdinov (RUS)
Combat 70 kg	Georgy Fernante (FRA)	Goran Borović (CRO)	Georgy Shavdatuashvili (RUS)
Combat 70 kg	Georgy Fernante (FRA)	Goran Borović (CRO)	Damjan Markovic (SRB)
Combat 75 kg	Tony Ancelin (FRA)	Teddy Aoue Alongo (CGO)	Mohsen Farzi (IRI)
Combat 75 kg	Tony Ancelin (FRA)	Teddy Aoue Alongo (CGO)	Luca Sacco (ITA)
Combat 80 kg	Damir Plantic (CRO)	Ljubomir Cestic (SRB)	Alexander Sidorkin (RUS)
Combat 80 kg	Damir Plantic (CRO)	Ljubomir Cestic (SRB)	Iurii Zubchuk (UKR)
Combat 90 kg	Alexey Sachivko (RUS)	Romain Falendry (FRA)	Josip Gruic (CRO)
Combat 90 kg	Alexey Sachivko (RUS)	Romain Falendry (FRA)	Mykyta Chub (UKR)

=== Women ===
Event	Gold	Silver	Bronze
Assault 52 kg	Ivana Popadić (SRB)	Marion Patricia Trouillet (FRA)	Marta Murru (ITA)
Assault 52 kg	Ivana Popadić (SRB)	Marion Patricia Trouillet (FRA)	Lydia Gosselin-Couture (CAN)
Assault 56 kg	Mathilde Christel Mignier (FRA)	Rimma Golubeva (RUS)	Miriam D'Agostino (ITA)
Assault 56 kg	Mathilde Christel Mignier (FRA)	Rimma Golubeva (RUS)	Milica Nedeljkovic (SRB)
Assault 60 kg	Sarah Tribou (FRA)	Valentina Perini (ITA)	Hayatte Akodad (MAR)
Assault 60 kg	Sarah Tribou (FRA)	Valentina Perini (ITA)	Rebecca Murray (CAN)
Assault 70 kg	Marlene Chantal Cieslik (FRA)	Nina Vehar (SLO)	Yudan Bao (CHN)
Assault 70 kg	Marlene Chantal Cieslik (FRA)	Nina Vehar (SLO)	Teodora Manic (SRB)
