= 2011 Ju-Jitsu World Championships =

- Host city: Cali, Colombia
- Dates: 15–16 October
- Main venue: Evangelista Mora Coliseum

The 2011 Ju-Jitsu World Championship were the 10th edition of the Ju-Jitsu World Championships, and were held in Cali, Colombia from October 15 to October 16, 2011.

== Schedule ==
- 15.10.2011 – Men's and Women's Fighting System, Men's and Women's Jiu-Jitsu (ne-waza), Men's and Women's Duo System – Classic
- 16.10.2011 – Men's and Women's Fighting System, Men's and Women's Jiu-Jitsu (ne-waza), Mixed Duo System – Classic

== European Ju-Jitsu ==
=== Fighting System ===
==== Men's events ====
Category	Gold	Silver	Bronze	
–56 kg	Peter Morgner (GER)	Jeison Mora (COL)	Fabien Biteau (FRA)	Mehdi Hadiha (IRI)
–62 kg	Pavel Korzhavykh (RUS)	Javier García (ESP)	Gerhard Mende (GER)	Mohamed Drari (FRA)
–69 kg	Dmitry Beshenets (RUS)	Alexander Reichert (GER)	Andriy Olkha (UKR)	Sébastien Marty (FRA)
–77 kg	Igor Rudnev (RUS)	Anton Fedorov (RUS)	Johan de Gier (NED)	Sami Loussif (BEL)
–85 kg	Masoud Jalilvand (IRI)	Tomasz Krajewski (POL)	Rafał Riss (POL)	Dmitry Nebolsin (RUS)
–94 kg	Tomasz Szewczak (POL)	Gertjan Hofland (NED)	Thaer Odeh (ESP)	Vincent Parisi (FRA)
+94 kg	Frédéric Husson (FRA)	Mojtaba Akbari (IRI)	Ricardo Aguirre (ARG)	Simon Roiger (GER)

==== Women's events ====
Category	Gold	Silver	Bronze	
–49 kg	Agnieszka Bergier (POL)	Cătălina Mihalache (ROU)	Maria Salmanov (GER)	Manon Bouquillon (FRA)
–55 kg	Mandy Sonnemann (GER)	Martyna Bierońska (POL)	Olga Shitova (RUS)	Anna Knutsen (NOR)
–62 kg	Carina Neupert (GER)	Séverine Nébié (FRA)	Heleen Baars (NED)	Sara Widgren (SWE)
–70 kg	Emilia Maćkowiak (POL)	Myriam Rahali (FRA)	Aleksandra Ivanova (RUS)	Lindsay Wyatt (NED)
+70 kg	Catherine Jacques (BEL)	Albertine Los (NED)	Sabina Predovnik (SLO)	Alla Paderina (RUS)

=== Duo System ===
==== Duo Classic events ====
Category	Gold	Silver	Bronze	
men	Ruben Assmann (NED); Johan de Gier (NED)	Dries Beyer (GER); Raphael Rochner (GER)	Michele Vallieri (ITA); Vito Zaccaria (ITA)	Johann Mauny (FRA); Kamel Zeghmar (FRA)
women	Genoveva Galan (ROU); Cătălina Mihalache (ROU)	Mirnesa Bećirović (AUT); Mirneta Bećirović (AUT)	Anastasiya Michaylova (RUS); Nataliya Krylova (RUS)	Isabelle Bacon (FRA); Patricia Floquet (FRA)
mixed	Marcus Haider (AUT); Vera Bichler (AUT)	Tom Ismer (GER); Dominika Zagorski (GER)	Michele Vallieri (ITA); Sara Paganini (ITA)	Nicolas Perea (FRA); Aurore Perea (FRA)

== Brazilian Jiu-Jitsu ==
=== Men's events ===
Category	Gold	Silver	Bronze	
–70 kg	Sébastien Marty (FRA)	Wilson Alzate (COL)	Mohsen Ghaffar (IRI)	Enrique Rivera (MEX)
–85 kg	Dmitry Nebolsin (RUS)	Wolfgang Heindel_{[de]} (GER)	Franck Vatan (FRA)	Fabricio Nascimento (ITA)
+85 kg	Frédéric Husson (FRA)	Vincent Parisi (FRA)	Alvaro Riascos (COL)	Marcelo Coppa (ITA)

=== Women's events ===
Category	Gold	Silver	Bronze	
–58 kg	Martyna Bierońska (POL)	Isabelle Bacon (FRA)	Anastasia Tonelli (ITA)	Danae Morin (MEX)
–70 kg	Séverine Nébié (FRA)	Madeline Choconta (COL)	Emilia Maćkowiak (POL)	María Rodríguez (MEX)
