= Philippines at the 2023 World Combat Games =

- IOC code: PHI
- NOC: Philippine Olympic Committee
- Website: www.olympic.ph (in English)

in Riyadh 20 October 2023 – 30 October 2023
- Competitors: 19 in 6 sports
- Medals Ranked 20th: Gold 3 Silver 5 Bronze 5 Total 13

World Combat Games appearances
- 2010, 2013, 2023

The Philippines competed at the 2023 World Combat Games in Riyadh, Saudi Arabia, from 20 to 30 October 2023.

The Philippine Olympic Committee sent 19 athletes from 6 combat sports in the multi-sports event for martial arts disciplines.

At the conclusion of the World Combat Games, the Philippines finished in 20th place with a total of 3 golds, 5 silvers and 5 bronze medals from 5 sports except kickboxing.

== Medalists ==
=== Gold ===
Medal	Athlete	Sport	Event	Date
Gold	Kaila Napolis	Jiu-Jitsu	Women's Newaza -52 kg	October 25
Gold	Kylie Mallari; Rhichein Yosorez	Muay Thai	Mixed Mai Muay	October 29
Gold	Darius Venerable	Taekwondo	Men's Individual Poomsae	October 30

=== Silver ===
Medal	Athlete	Sport	Event	Date
Silver	Agatha Wong	Wushu	Women's Taijiquan and Taijijian	October 23
Silver	Clemente Tabugara	Wushu	Men's Sanda 65 kg	October 23
Silver	Islay Erika Bomogao	Muay Thai	Women's Waikru	October 29
Silver	Phillip Delarmino; Ariel Lee Lampacan	Muay Thai	Mixed Mai Muay	October 29
Silver	Rudzma Abubakar	Muay Thai	Women's -48 kg	October 30

=== Bronze ===
Medal	Athlete	Sport	Event	Date
Bronze	Jones Inso	Wushu	Men's Taijiquan and Taijijian	October 23
Bronze	Thornton Sayan	Wushu	Men's Nandao and Nangun	October 23
Bronze	Fierre Afan	Wrestling	Men's Grappling Gi 71 kg	October 24
Bronze	Maria Aisa Ratcliff	Wrestling	Women's Grappling Gi 53 kg	October 24
Bronze	Juvenile Crisostomo; Kobe Macario	Taekwondo	Mixed Pair Poomsae	October 29

== Medal summary ==
=== By sports ===
Sport	Gold	Silver	Bronze	Total
Muay Thai	1	3	0	4
Taekwondo	1	0	1	2
Jiu-Jitsu	1	0	0	1
Wushu	0	2	2	4
Wrestling	0	0	2	2
Totals (5 entries)	3	5	5	13

=== By date ===
Day	Date	1st place, gold medalist(s)	2nd place, silver medalist(s)	3rd place, bronze medalist(s)	Total
1	October 20	0	0	0	0
2	October 21	0	0	0	0
3	October 22	0	0	0	0
4	October 23	0	2	2	4
5	October 24	0	0	2	2
6	October 25	1	0	0	1
7	October 26	0	0	0	0
8	October 27	0	0	0	0
9	October 28	0	0	0	0
10	October 29	1	2	1	4
11	October 30	1	1	0	2
Total		3	5	5	13

== See also ==
- Philippines at the 2022 Asian Games
- Philippines at the 2023 Southeast Asian Games
