= 2006 Ju-Jitsu World Championships =

Ju-Jitsu World Championship held in Rotterdam, Netherlands

- Host city: Rotterdam, Netherlands
- Dates: 17–19 November
- Main venue: Topsportcentrum Rotterdam

The 2006 Ju-Jitsu World Championship were the 7th edition of the Ju-Jitsu World Championships, and were held in Rotterdam, Netherlands from November 17 to November 19, 2006.

== Schedule ==
- 17.11.2006 – Men's and Women's Fighting System, Men's Duo System – Classic
- 18.11.2006 – Men's and Women's Fighting System, Women's Duo System – Classic
- 19.11.2006 – Men's and Women's Fighting System, Mixed Duo System – Classic

== European Ju-Jitsu ==
=== Fighting System ===
==== Men's events ====
Category	Gold	Silver	Bronze	
–62 kg	Anders Lauridsen (DEN)	Javier García (ESP)	Oliver Haider (AUT)	Nicolás Giménez (FRA)
–69 kg	Rémy Carrasco (FRA)	Ferry Hendriks (NED)	Fedor Serov (RUS)	Marco Baratti (ITA)
–77 kg	Igor Rudnev (RUS)	Johan Ingholt (SWE)	Mario Staller (GER)	Ivan Nastenko (UKR)
–85 kg	Andreas Kuhl (GER)	Dmitry Nebolsin (RUS)	Jakob Tidemann (DEN)	Franck Vatan (FRA)
–94 kg	Rob Haans (NED)	Tomasz Szewczak (POL)	Vedran Ikić (CRO)	Vincent Parisi (FRA)
+94 kg	Frédéric Husson (FRA)	Mihai Neaga (ROU)	Sergey Kunashov (RUS)	Dariusz Zimoląg (POL)

==== Women's events ====
Category	Gold	Silver	Bronze	
–55 kg	Annabelle Reydy (FRA)	Linda Lindström (SWE)	Andrea Plefka (GER)	Monika Dikow (POL)
–62 kg	Isabelle Bacon (FRA)	Sabrina Hatzky (GER)	Margarita Montes (ESP)	Judith de Weerd (NED)
–70 kg	Lindsay Wyatt (NED)	Sonja Kinz (GER)	Corinne Sarcy (FRA)	Aurora Fajardo (ESP)
+70 kg	Taja Lüthje (DEN)	Albertine Los (NED)	Marzena Makula (POL)	Mélanie Lavis (FRA)

=== Duo System ===
==== Duo Classic events ====
Category	Gold	Silver	Bronze	
men	Pascal Müller (SUI); Remo Müller (SUI)	Karim Benboudaoud (FRA); Grégoire Cordesse (FRA)	Florens Goldbeck (GER); Felix Schmidt (GER)	Barry van Bommel (NED); Ron Soechit (NED)
women	Angelique Dekker (NED); Silvia Alvarez (NED)	Nadin Altmüller (GER); Stefanie Satory (GER)	Maria Eriksson (SWE); Malin Persson (SWE)	Muriel Boldi (FRA); Angélique Jasset (FRA)
mixed	Mathias Huber (GER); Corinna Endele (GER)	David Heiremans (FRA); Séverine Heiremans (FRA)	Michel Bürgisser (SUI); Silvie Kümin (SUI)	Barry van Bommel (NED); Silvia Alvarez (NED)
