= 2002 Ju-Jitsu World Championships =

- Host city: Punta del Este, Uruguay
- Dates: 23–24 November
- Main venue: Campus Municipal de Maldonado

The 2002 Ju-Jitsu World Championship were the 5th edition of the Ju-Jitsu World Championships, and were held in Punta del Este, Uruguay from November 23 to November 24, 2002.

== Schedule ==
- 23.11.2002 – Men's and Women's Fighting System, Men's and Women's Duo System – Classic
- 24.11.2002 – Men's and Women's Fighting System, Mixed Duo System – Classic

== European Ju-Jitsu ==
=== Fighting System ===
==== Men's events ====
Category	Gold	Silver	Bronze	
–62 kg	Javier García (ESP)	André Hötzel (GER)	Alireza Davoudi (IRI)	John Zwalve (NED)
–69 kg	Cyrille Jouffroy (FRA)	Wolfgang Heindel_{[de]} (GER)	Christian Mattle (DEN)	Michał Adamczyk (POL)
–77 kg	Gregory Vallarino (URU)	Thomas Kager (GER)	Marek Krajewski (POL)	Didier Cézar (FRA)
–85 kg	Matthijs Wilhelmus (NED)	Carsten Ettrup (DEN)	Ricard Carneborn (SWE)	Alexandros Kitsopoulos (GRE)
–94 kg	Fernando Segovia (ESP)	Grzegorz Zimoląg (POL)	Uwe Steinmetz (GER)	Vincent Parisi (FRA)
+94 kg	Marcelo Figueiredo (BRA)	Frédéric Husson (FRA)	Paweł Malowaniec (POL)	Remco Pardoel (NED)

==== Women's events ====
Category	Gold	Silver	Bronze	
–55 kg	Annabelle Reydy (FRA)	Irene Figoli (URU)	Iris Zahn (GER)	Pernilla Gunnarsson (SWE)
–62 kg	Isabelle Bacon (FRA)	Bianca Blöchl (GER)	Nadia Bertrand (BEL)	Diana Gascó (ESP)
–70 kg	Nicole Sydbøge (DEN)	Anna Dimberg (SWE)	Sonja Kinz (GER)	Corinne Sarcy (FRA)
+70 kg	Sabine Felser (GER)	Jennie Brolin (SWE)	Joanna Poradzisz (POL)	Mélanie Lavis (FRA)

=== Duo System ===
==== Duo Classic events ====
Category	Gold	Silver	Bronze	
men	Laurent Beard (FRA); Julien Hellouin (FRA)	Ian Jensen (DEN); Per Jensen (DEN)	Marco Limacher (SUI); Phillip Zigraggen (SUI)	Tom Jacobs (BEL); Wim Kersemans (BEL)
women	Silvia Alvarez (NED); Nuray Batman (NED)	Nadin Altmüller (GER); Stefanie Satory (GER)	Sandy Van Landeghem (BEL); Vanessa Van de Vijver (BEL)	Laetitia Deloris (FRA); Géraldine Dejardin (FRA)
mixed	Pascal Trehiou (FRA); Patricia Floquet (FRA)	Barry van Bommel (NED); Angelique Poort (NED)	Mathias Huber (GER); Corinna Endele (GER)	Miguel Ángel Benítez (ESP); Isabel Talavera (ESP)
