= Conrad Cummings (boxer) =

British boxer (born 1991)

Personal information
- Nickname: Dynamite
- Born: 24 May 1991 (age 35) Craigavon, County Armagh, Northern Ireland
- Height: 5 ft 11 in (180 cm)
- Weight: Middleweight

Boxing career
- Stance: Orthodox

Boxing record
- Total fights: 22
- Wins: 17
- Win by KO: 7
- Losses: 4
- Draws: 1

Conrad Cummings (born 24 May 1991) is a professional boxer from Northern Ireland who held the WBO European middleweight title twice between 2017 and 2019.

== Professional career ==
=== Early career ===
Cummings made his professional debut on 22 February 2014, scoring a four-round points decision (PTS) victory over Andrejs Loginovs at the York Hall in London.

After compiling a record of 7–0 (3 KOs) he faced Alfredo Meli for the vacant Celtic middleweight title on 20 November 2015 at the Waterfront Hall in Belfast, Northern Ireland. Cummings scored a knockdown within the first minute of the fight, Meli appeared unhurt and made it back to his feet by the referee's count of three. Cummings received multiple warnings throughout the fight for low blows and pushing down on Meli's head before both fighters were deducted one point for excessive holding in the ninth round. After then ten rounds came to an end the bout was scored a split draw, with the Celtic title remaining vacant. One judge scored the bout 95–92 in favour of Cummings, the second scored it 96–93 to Meli, while the third judge scored it even at 94–94.

Following three consecutive wins, one by stoppage, Cummings faced Ronny Mittag for the vacant IBF Inter-Continental middleweight title on 18 November 2016 at the Wembley Arena in London. In what was described as a controversial decision, Cummings suffered his first professional defeat, losing by split decision over ten rounds. One judge scored the bout 96–94 in favour of Cummings while the other two scored it 96–94 to Mittag.

=== WBO European title ===
The pair were set to face each other in an immediate rematch scheduled for 11 March 2017 at the Motorpoint Arena in Cardiff, Wales, featuring on the undercard of a British cruiserweight title fight between Craig Kennedy and Stephen Simmons. However, the fight was cancelled one week before the event after Simmons – who was a replacement for Kennedy's original opponent, Matty Askin – had pulled out of the headline bout due to suffering an injury. As a result of the cancellation, Mittag withdrew from the bout with Cummings. Days after the date of the cancelled event it was announced a new fight had been scheduled for 24 March 2017 against Gogi Knezevic for the vacant WBO European middleweight title, taking place at the Meadowbank Sports Centre in Edinburgh, Scotland. Cummings scored a knockdown in the first round before ending the fight in the third to capture his first professional title via knockout (KO).

The first defence of his newly won WBO regional title was scheduled to take place on 29 July 2017 against Robert Swierzbinski at the SSE Arena in Belfast, as part of the undercard for Carl Frampton vs. Andrés Gutiérrez. However, Gutiérrez withdrew from the contest on 28 July after he slipped in the bath and suffered facial injuries, resulting in the cancellation of the entire event. Following the cancellation the WBO stripped Cummings of his European title for failing defend it.

==== Cummings vs. Luke Keeler ====
Following the cancellation and subsequent loss of his title, Cummings scored two wins in six-round bouts – Norbert Szekeres by PTS in December and Michael Mora by technical knockout (TKO) in February 2018 – before getting the chance to regain the vacant WBO European title against Luke Keeler. The bout took place on 21 April 2018 at the SSE Arena in Belfast as part of the undercard for Carl Frampton vs. Nonito Donaire. Cummings suffered the second defeat of his professional career, losing by unanimous decision (UD) with the judges' scorecards reading 97–93, 98–92, and 99–91.

==== Regaining the WBO European title ====
He bounced back from defeat with two wins in six-round bouts – Nicky Jenman by PTS in August and Jan Balog by TKO in October – before challenging for the vacant WBO European title for the third time in his career. Keeler was scheduled to defend the title against Brian Rose but was forced to pull out of the bout and vacate the title due to a back injury, resulting in Cummings stepping in as a replacement for the vacant title with the bout being scheduled for 7 December at the Titanic Exhibition Centre in Belfast. Rose was forced to withdraw from the bout after suffering a shoulder injury in an interim fight one month prior and was replaced by Ferenc Berki. Cummings regained the WBO European title via UD, with the judges' scorecards reading 99–90, 98–92, and 95–94.

==== Cummings vs. Luke Keeler II ====
His first defence came in a rematch with Keeler, taking place on 29 March 2019 at the Ulster Hall in Belfast. After suffering a cut to his left eye in the third round, Cummings went on to lose by a wide-margin UD with one judge scoring the bout 99–91 and the other two scoring it 98–92.

==== Fourth WBO European title shot ====
Following his third professional defeat, Cummings bounced back with a six-round PTS victory against Adam Grabiec in October. After Keeler vacated the WBO European title in pursuit of a world title shot, Cummings secures a fourth attempt at the vacant title, this time against Danny Dignum on 9 November 2019 at the York Hall. In a fight which saw Cummings receive a point deduction in the second round for repeated use of the elbow and suffer a cut in the fourth from an accidental clash of heads, he went on to suffer the fourth defeat of his career, the first by stoppage, losing via fifth-round TKO after Dignum landed a solid left hook which left Cummings on unsteady legs, prompting referee Howard Foster to step in and call a halt to the contest.

== Professional boxing record ==
22 fights	17 wins	4 losses
By knockout	7	1
By decision	10	3
Draws	1	

No.	Result	Record	Opponent	Type	Round, time	Date	Location	Notes
22	Loss	17–4–1	Danny Dignum	TKO	5 (10), 0:21	9 Nov 2019	York Hall, London, England	For vacant WBO European middleweight title
21	Win	17–3–1	Adam Grabiec	PTS	6	11 Oct 2019	Ulster Hall, Belfast, Northern Ireland	
20	Loss	16–3–1	Luke Keeler	UD	10	29 Mar 2019	Ulster Hall, Belfast, Northern Ireland	Lost WBO European middleweight title
19	Win	16–2–1	Ferenc Berki	UD	10	7 Dec 2018	Titanic Exhibition Centre, Belfast, Northern Ireland	Won vacant WBO European middleweight title
18	Win	15–2–1	Jan Balog	TKO	1 (6), 2:21	5 Oct 2018	Titanic Exhibition Centre, Belfast, Northern Ireland	
17	Win	14–2–1	Nicky Jenman	PTS	6	18 Aug 2018	Windsor Park, Belfast, Northern Ireland	
16	Loss	13–2–1	Luke Keeler	UD	10	21 Apr 2018	SSE Arena, Belfast, Northern Ireland	For vacant WBO European middleweight title
15	Win	13–1–1	Michael Mora	TKO	2 (6), 2:47	10 Feb 2018	Devenish Sports Complex, Belfast, Northern Ireland	
14	Win	12–1–1	Norbert Szekeres	PTS	6	1 Dec 2017	Devenish Sports Complex, Belfast, Northern Ireland	
13	Win	11–1–1	Gogi Knezevic	KO	3 (12), 2:10	24 Mar 2017	Meadowbank Sports Center, Edinburgh, Scotland	Won vacant WBO European middleweight title
12	Loss	10–1–1	Ronny Mittag	SD	10	18 Nov 2016	Wembley Arena, London, England	For vacant IBF Inter-Continental middleweight title
11	Win	10–0–1	Dante Moore	UD	6	30 Jul 2016	Barclays Center, New York City, New York, US	
10	Win	9–0–1	Frankie Borg	TKO	6 (6), 1:19	14 May 2016	Ice Arena Wales, Cardiff, Wales	
9	Win	8–0–1	Victor Garcia	PTS	6	27 Feb 2016	Manchester Arena, Manchester, England	
8	Draw	7–0–1	Alfredo Meli	SD	10	20 Nov 2015	Waterfront Hall, Belfast, Northern Ireland	For vacant Celtic middleweight title
7	Win	7–0	Oscar Riojas	TKO	2 (6), 1:26	18 Jul 2015	Don Haskins Center, El Paso, Texas, US	
6	Win	6–0	Roberto Palenzuela	PTS	6	28 Feb 2015	Odyssey Arena, Belfast, Northern Ireland	
5	Win	5–0	Norbert Szekeres	UD	6	29 Nov 2014	Falconer Centeret, Frederiksberg, Denmark	
4	Win	4–0	Robert Talarek	PTS	6	6 Sep 2014	Titanic Quarter, Belfast, Northern Ireland	
3	Win	3–0	Lajos Munkacsi	TKO	2 (6), 0:55	20 Jun 2014	Waterfront Hall, Belfast, Northern Ireland	
2	Win	2–0	Zahari Mutafchiev	TKO	3 (6), 0:01	4 Apr 2014	Odyssey Arena, Belfast, Northern Ireland	
1	Win	1–0	Andrejs Loginovs	PTS	4	22 Feb 2014	York Hall, London, England	
