= Fencing at the 2013 World Combat Games =

Fencing at the 2013 World Combat Games, was held at St. Petersburg Sports and Concert Complex Hall 2, in Saint Petersburg, Russia, from the 24 to 26 October 2013.

== Medal table ==
Key:

* Host nation (Russia)

Rank	Nation	Gold	Silver	Bronze	Total
1	South Korea (KOR)	2	1	0	3
2	Hungary (HUN)	1	1	1	3
3	Estonia (EST)	1	1	0	2
4	Great Britain (GBR)	1	0	0	1
4	Italy (ITA)	1	0	0	1
6	Russia (RUS)*	0	1	2	3
7	Romania (ROU)	0	1	0	1
7	United States (USA)	0	1	0	1
9	China (CHN)	0	0	1	1
9	France (FRA)	0	0	1	1
9	Germany (GER)	0	0	1	1
Totals (11 entries)		6	6	6	18

== Medal summary ==
=== Men ===
Event	Gold	Silver	Bronze
Épée Individual	Nikolai Novosjolov (EST)	Gábor Boczkó (HUN)	Ulrich Robeiri (FRA)
Foil Individual	Richard Kruse (GBR)	Race Imboden (USA)	Artur Akhmatkhuzin (RUS)
Sabre Individual	Gu Bon-gil (KOR)	Tiberiu Dolniceanu (ROU)	Áron Szilágyi (HUN)

=== Women ===
Event	Gold	Silver	Bronze
Épée Individual	Emese Szász (HUN)	Julia Beljajeva (EST)	Xu Anqi (CHN)
Foil Individual	Carolina Erba (ITA)	Inna Deriglazova (RUS)	Carolin Golubytskyi (GER)
Sabre Individual	Kim Ji-yeon (KOR)	Lee Ra-jin (KOR)	Yekaterina Dyachenko (RUS)
