= Taekwondo at the 2013 World Combat Games =

Taekwondo competition

Taekwondo, for the 2013 World Combat Games, took place at the Spartak - Sports Complex 'Arena', in Saint Petersburg, Russia. Preliminary rounds were contested on the 23 October 2013. Medals for this sport were awarded on the 24 October 2013.

== Medal table ==
Key:

* Host nation (Russia)

| Rank | Nation | Gold | Silver | Bronze | Total |
|---|---|---|---|---|---|
| 1 | China (CHN) | 1 | 0 | 0 | 1 |
| 1 | Iran (IRI) | 1 | 0 | 0 | 1 |
| 3 | France (FRA) | 0 | 1 | 0 | 1 |
| 3 | United States (USA) | 0 | 1 | 0 | 1 |
| 5 | Russia (RUS)* | 0 | 0 | 2 | 2 |
| Totals (5 entries) | | 2 | 2 | 2 | 6 |

== Medal summary ==
| Event | Gold | Silver | Bronze |
|---|---|---|---|
| Men's Kyorugi Team | Iran; Farzad Abdollahi; Behnam Asbaghi; Masoud Hajji-Zavareh; Mohammad Kazemi; Alireza Nasr Azadani; Kourosh Rajoli | United States; Timothy James Curry; James Albert Howe II; Steven T. Lin; Nir Moriah; Phillip Jae-Duk YUN | Russia; Alexey Denisenko; Vladimir Kim; Anton Kotkov; Konstantin Mimin; Vasilii Nikitin; Aydemir Shakhbanov |
| Women's Kyorugi Team | China; GUO Yunfei; HOU Yuzhuo; LI Chen; WANG Lun; WU Jingyu; ZHANG Hua | France; Aline Dossou Gbete; Floriane Liborio; Maeva Mellier; Haby Niare; Estelle Vander Zwalm | Russia; Anastasiia Baryshnikova; Kristina Khafizova; Alexandra Lychagina; Ekaterina Mitrofanova; Anastasia Skipina; Daria Zhuravleva |
