= Kendo at the 2013 World Combat Games =

Kendo for the 2013 World Combat Games was held at St. Petersburg Sports and Concert Complex Hall 2, in Saint Petersburg, Russia. The competition took place on 21–22 October 2013.

== Medal table ==
Rank	Nation	Gold	Silver	Bronze	Total
1	Japan (JPN)	5	2	3	10
2	South Korea (KOR)	1	1	4	6
3	France (FRA)	0	1	0	1
3	Germany (GER)	0	1	0	1
3	Hungary (HUN)	0	1	0	1
6	United States (USA)	0	0	2	2
7	Brazil (BRA)	0	0	1	1
7	Chinese Taipei (TPE)	0	0	1	1
7	Netherlands (NED)	0	0	1	1
Totals (9 entries)		6	6	12	24

== Medal summary ==
=== Men ===
Event	Gold	Silver	Bronze
Individual	Kangho Lee (KOR)	Sandor Dubi (HUN)	Hitoshi Shime (JPN)
Individual	Kangho Lee (KOR)	Sandor Dubi (HUN)	Mitsunari Shikano (JPN)
Youth	Yuya Takenouchi (JPN)	Koichi Nakabayashi (FRA)	Yu-Cheng Chang (TPE)
Youth	Yuya Takenouchi (JPN)	Koichi Nakabayashi (FRA)	Manuk Jang (KOR)
Special invitational	Kazuo Furukawa (JPN)	Katsuhiko Tani (JPN)	Dong Chul Park (KOR)
Special invitational	Kazuo Furukawa (JPN)	Katsuhiko Tani (JPN)	Yong Chun Park (KOR)

=== Women ===
Event	Gold	Silver	Bronze
Individual	Yoko Sakuma (JPN)	Safiyah Fadai (GER)	Nishiki Jade Sano (USA)
Individual	Yoko Sakuma (JPN)	Safiyah Fadai (GER)	Mariko Yamamoto (JPN)
Youth	Mizuki Matsumoto (JPN)	허윤영 (KOR)	Sayo van der Woude (NED)
Youth	Mizuki Matsumoto (JPN)	허윤영 (KOR)	Marina Kodato (BRA)
Special invitational	Mika Shimokawa (JPN)	Sachie Miyazaki (JPN)	Kyung Wha Back (KOR)
Special invitational	Mika Shimokawa (JPN)	Sachie Miyazaki (JPN)	Emi Anderson (USA)
