= Wrestling at the 2013 World Combat Games =

Wrestling, for the 2013 World Combat Games, was held at the St. Petersburg Sports and Concert Complex Hall 1, in Saint Petersburg, Russia. It started from 23 to 25 October 2013.

== Medal table ==
Key:

* Host nation (Russia)

| Rank | Nation | Gold | Silver | Bronze | Total |
|---|---|---|---|---|---|
| 1 | Russia (RUS)* | 9 | 4 | 4 | 17 |
| 2 | Ukraine (UKR) | 1 | 4 | 2 | 7 |
| 3 | Poland (POL) | 1 | 1 | 3 | 5 |
| 4 | Azerbaijan (AZE) | 1 | 0 | 0 | 1 |
| 4 | Kyrgyzstan (KGZ) | 1 | 0 | 0 | 1 |
| 4 | Lithuania (LTU) | 1 | 0 | 0 | 1 |
| 4 | Sweden (SWE) | 1 | 0 | 0 | 1 |
| 8 | Italy (ITA) | 0 | 2 | 1 | 3 |
| 9 | Moldova (MDA) | 0 | 1 | 0 | 1 |
| 10 | France (FRA) | 0 | 0 | 1 | 1 |
| 10 | Romania (ROU) | 0 | 0 | 1 | 1 |
| Totals (11 entries) | | 15 | 12 | 12 | 39 |

== Medal summary ==
=== Men ===
| Event | Gold | Silver | Bronze |
|---|---|---|---|
| Belt 90 kg | Edvinas Rajuncas (LTU) | Leonid Riabchun (UKR) | Islam Abaykhanov (RUS) |
| Belt +90 kg | Nurbek Akanov (KGZ) | Andryi Nikitchenko (UKR) | Dmitrii Smoliakov (RUS) |
| Grappling Gi 71 kg | Marat Gafurov (RUS) | Simone Franceschini (ITA) | Maciej Polok (POL) |
| Grappling Gi 92 kg | Abdurakhman Bilarov (RUS) | Bruno Ivan Tomasetti (ITA) | Hassan Betelgeriev (RUS) |
| Grappling NoGi 66 kg | Surkhay Asadulaev (RUS) | Zaynutdin Zaynukov (RUS) | Piotr Podstawczuk (POL) |
| Grappling NoGi 77 kg | Oleg Bagov (RUS) | Magomed Abdulkadirov (RUS) | Kamil Mitosek (POL) |
| Grappling NoGi 84 kg | Maciej Glabus (POL) | Albert Duraev (RUS) | Luca Anacoreta (ITA) |
| Pankration 66 kg | Vugar Karamov (AZE) | Andrii Rieznik (UKR) | Albert Shogenov (RUS) |
| Pankration 77 kg | Magomed Aldiev (RUS) | Dmitri Capmari (MDA) | Oleksandr Vysotskyi (UKR) |
| Pankration 84 kg | Sergii Guziev (UKR) | Islam Gugov (RUS) | Sorin Florea (ROM) |
| Freestyle Team | Russia; Ilyas Bekbulatov; Aleksandr Bogomoev; Abdusalam Gadisov; Makhamagazi Magomedov; Magomed Shakhrudinov; Denis Tsargush; Bazar Zhalsapov | World Team; Andrei Dukov; Aslan Dzebisov; Aghahuseyn Mustafayev; Gheorghita Stefan; Kiril Terziev; Radoslav Velikov; Ivan Yankouski | Not awarded |
| Greco-Roman Team | Russia; Sergey Andrusik; Alexander Chekhirkin; Yury Denisov; Alan Khugaev; Ibragim Labazanov; Bekkhan Mankiev; Rustam Totrov | World Team; Edward Barsegjan; Murad Bazarov; Arkadiy Blyumin; Kyril Hruschenko; Aleksandar Maksimović; Elvin Mursaliyev; Valery Palenski | Not awarded |

=== Women ===
| Event | Gold | Silver | Bronze |
|---|---|---|---|
| Grappling Gi 64 kg | Sophia Nordeno (SWE) | Karolina Zawodnik (POL) | Yuliya Toryanska (UKR) |
| Grappling NoGi 58 kg | Maria Shkvarunets (RUS) | Viktoriia Syniavina (UKR) | Oceane Talvard (FRA) |
| Freestyle Team | Russia; Irina Bogdanova; Valeriya Chepsarakova; Anna Maksimova; Natalia Malysheva; Irina Ologonova; Anastasiya Shavlinskaya; Natalia Vorobieva | World Team; Anzhela Dorogan; Katarzyna Krawczyk; Tetyana Lavrenchuk; Halina Leuchanka; Mariya Livach; Petra Olli | Not awarded |
