= Sambo at the 2013 World Combat Games =

Sambo competitions

Sambo, for the 2013 World Combat Games, took place at the Spartak Sport Complex in Saint Petersburg, Russia, on the 18 and 19 October 2013.

== Medal table ==
Key:

* Host nation (Russia)

Rank	Nation	Gold	Silver	Bronze	Total
1	Russia (RUS)*	4	0	1	5
2	Ukraine (UKR)	1	1	0	2
3	France (FRA)	1	0	0	1
4	Bulgaria (BUL)	0	2	0	2
5	Serbia (SRB)	0	1	1	2
6	Armenia (ARM)	0	1	0	1
6	Canada (CAN)	0	1	0	1
8	Belarus (BLR)	0	0	2	2
9	Argentina (ARG)	0	0	1	1
9	Finland (FIN)	0	0	1	1
9	Georgia (GEO)	0	0	1	1
9	Israel (ISR)	0	0	1	1
9	Lithuania (LTU)	0	0	1	1
9	Moldova (MDA)	0	0	1	1
9	Romania (ROU)	0	0	1	1
9	Venezuela (VEN)	0	0	1	1
Totals (16 entries)		6	6	12	24

== Medal summary ==
=== Men ===
Event	Gold	Silver	Bronze
74 kg	Ali Kurzhev (RUS)	Dmytro BabiiChuck (UKR)	Federico Alejandro Clara (ARG)
74 kg	Ali Kurzhev (RUS)	Dmytro BabiiChuck (UKR)	Kakha Mamulashvili (GEO)
90 kg	Ivan Vasylchuk (UKR)	Emin Sheykhislyamov (CAN)	Radvilas Matukas (LTU)
90 kg	Ivan Vasylchuk (UKR)	Emin Sheykhislyamov (CAN)	Nikola Milošević (SRB)
+100 kg	Evgenil Isaev (RUS)	Hakob Arakelyan (ARM)	Aliaksandr Vakhaviak (BLR)
+100 kg	Evgenil Isaev (RUS)	Hakob Arakelyan (ARM)	Heikki Haapa-Aho (FIN)

=== Women ===
Event	Gold	Silver	Bronze
48 kg	Elena Bondareva (RUS)	Galya Zaharieva Ivanova (BUL)	Maria Balbina Guedez Sarmiento (VEN)
48 kg	Elena Bondareva (RUS)	Galya Zaharieva Ivanova (BUL)	Leila Abbasava (BLR)
56 kg	Laure Anastasie Marie Fournier (FRA)	Kalina Georgieva Stefanova (BUL)	Daniela Hondiu (ROU)
56 kg	Laure Anastasie Marie Fournier (FRA)	Kalina Georgieva Stefanova (BUL)	Nadezda Zaytseva (RUS)
68 kg	Marina Mokhnatkina (RUS)	Ivana Jandrić (SRB)	Alice Hester Elizabeth Schlesinger (ISR)
68 kg	Marina Mokhnatkina (RUS)	Ivana Jandrić (SRB)	Marianna Davidova (MDA)
