= 2004 Ju-Jitsu World Championships =

Ju-jitsu event held by the Ju-Jitsu International Federation in 2004

- Host city: Móstoles, Spain
- Dates: 26–28 November
- Main venue: Polideportivo Los Rosales

The 2004 Ju-Jitsu World Championship were the 6th edition of the Ju-Jitsu World Championships, and were held in Móstoles, Spain from November 26 to November 28, 2004.

== Schedule ==
- 26.11.2004 – Men's and Women's Fighting System, Men's Duo System – Classic
- 27.11.2004 – Men's and Women's Fighting System, Women's Duo System – Classic
- 28.11.2004 – Men's and Women's Fighting System, Mixed Duo System – Classic

== European Ju-Jitsu ==
=== Fighting System ===
==== Men's events ====
Category	Gold	Silver	Bronze	
–62 kg	Javier García (ESP)	Marko Šikonja (SLO)	André Hötzel (GER)	Leonel Catalano (ARG)
–69 kg	Wolfgang Heindel_{[de]} (GER)	Ferry Hendriks (NED)	(FRA)	Christian Mattle (DEN)
–77 kg	Barry van Bommel (NED)	Dragan Milutinović (SLO)	Marek Krajewski (POL)	Sami Loussif (BEL)
–85 kg	Andreas Kuhl (GER)	David Amores (ESP)	Franck Vatan (FRA)	Gertjan Hofland (NED)
–94 kg	Uwe Steinmetz (GER)	Grzegorz Zimoląg (POL)	Fernando Segovia (ESP)	Vincent Parisi (FRA)
+94 kg	(FRA)	Josef Geddert (GER)	Dariusz Zimoląg (POL)	Mihai Neaga (ROU)

==== Women's events ====
Category	Gold	Silver	Bronze	
–55 kg	Jeanne Rasmussen (DEN)	Maurine Mur (FRA)	Monika Dikow (POL)	Minerva Montero (ESP)
–62 kg	Nicole Sydbøge (DEN)	Judith de Weerd (NED)	María Merin (ESP)	Isabelle Bacon (FRA)
–70 kg	Lindsay Wyatt (NED)	Aurora Fajardo (ESP)	Eila Günther (GER)	Mélanie Lavis (FRA)
+70 kg	Agnieszka Chlipała (POL)	Tanja De Leeuw (NED)	Seher Dumanli (GER)	Maria Engström (SWE)

=== Duo System ===
==== Duo Classic events ====
Category	Gold	Silver	Bronze	
men	Laurent Beard (FRA); Julien Hellouin (FRA)	Alexandre Barrero (ESP); Gil García (ESP)	Dejan Kink (SLO); Gorazd Kostevc (SLO)	Barry van Bommel (NED); Ron Soechit (NED)
women	Katharina Beisteiner (AUT); Eva Ehrlich (AUT)	Danijela Burzan (SCG); Dragana Burzan (SCG)	Nadin Altmüller (GER); Stefanie Satory (GER)	Vanja Preskar (SLO); Vita Preskar (SLO)
mixed	Barry van Bommel (NED); Silvia Alvarez (NED)	Andreas Zürcher (SUI); Marianne Schillinger (SUI)	Michele Vallieri (ITA); Linda Ragazzi (ITA)	David Heiremans (FRA); Séverine Heiremans (FRA)
