= Wushu at the 2023 World Combat Games =

- Venue: King Saud University Sports Arena
- Dates: 21-22 October, 2023

The wushu event at the 2023 World Combat Games took place at the Sports Arena at King Saud University in Riyadh, Saudi Arabia. The competition took place from October 21 to 22, 2023.

== Medal table ==
* Host nation (Saudi Arabia)

Rank	Nation	Gold	Silver	Bronze	Total
1	China (CHN)	7	0	0	7
2	Iran (IRI)	2	3	1	6
3	Macau (MAC)	1	2	0	3
4	Egypt (EGY)	1	1	0	2
5	Malaysia (MAS)	1	0	1	2
5	South Korea (KOR)	1	0	1	2
7	Chinese Taipei (TPE)	1	0	0	1
7	Morocco (MAR)	1	0	0	1
7	Nepal (NEP)	1	0	0	1
10	Philippines (PHI)	0	2	2	4
11	Brazil (BRA)	0	2	1	3
12	Indonesia (INA)	0	2	0	2
13	Saudi Arabia (KSA)	0	1	3	4
14	Singapore (SGP)	0	1	1	2
15	France (FRA)	0	1	0	1
15	Uzbekistan (UZB)	0	1	0	1
17	Lebanon (LBN)	0	0	2	2
18	Algeria (ALG)	0	0	1	1
18	Azerbaijan (AZE)	0	0	1	1
18	India (IND)	0	0	1	1
18	Jordan (JOR)	0	0	1	1
18	Kazakhstan (KAZ)	0	0	1	1
18	Mexico (MEX)	0	0	1	1
18	Switzerland (SUI)	0	0	1	1
18	Tunisia (TUN)	0	0	1	1
18	United States (USA)	0	0	1	1
Totals (26 entries)		16	16	21	53

== Medal summary ==
=== Men's taolu ===
Event	Gold	Silver	Bronze
Changquan	Bijay Sinjali (NEP)	Saman Ahmadi (IRI)	Everson Felipe da Silva (BRA)
Daoshu / Gunshu	Wu Zhaohua (CHN)	Seraf Naro Siregar (INA)	Jowen Lim (SGP)
Nanquan / Nangun	Liu Chang Min (TPE)	Huang Junhua (MAC)	Thornton Sayan (PHI)
Taijiquan / Taijijian	An Hyeongi (KOR)	Tay Yu Xuan (SGP)	Jones Inso (PHI)

=== Men's sanda ===
Event	Gold	Silver	Bronze
Sanda 56 kg	Jiang Haidong (CHN)	Laksmana Pandu Pratama (INA)	Aman Aljayzani (KSA)
Sanda 56 kg	Jiang Haidong (CHN)	Laksmana Pandu Pratama (INA)	Orkhan Hatamov (AZE)
Sanda 65 kg	EL Siefeldin Mohsen Elsayed Mohamed (EGY)	Clemnte Jr. Tabugara (PHI)	Abussamat Ashirov (KAZ)
Sanda 70 kg	Li Zhaoyang (CHN)	Mohammad Mehdi Rezaei (IRI)	Abdelhadi Bouabid (ALG)
Sanda 70 kg	Li Zhaoyang (CHN)	Mohammad Mehdi Rezaei (IRI)	Alexandre El Rassi (LBN)
Sanda 75 kg	Saad Boujekka (MAR)	Yoan Benedra Asensio-Gomez (FRA)	Wissem Ben Ammar (TUN)
Sanda 75 kg	Saad Boujekka (MAR)	Yoan Benedra Asensio-Gomez (FRA)	Kevin Alan Gallardo Onofre (MEX)
Sanda 85 kg	Mohammad Reza Rigi (IRI)	Ashraf Mohamad Abdelgawad (EGY)	Georges Eid (LBN)
Sanda 85 kg	Mohammad Reza Rigi (IRI)	Ashraf Mohamad Abdelgawad (EGY)	Omar Alfarooq Yahya (JOR)

=== Women's taolu ===
Event	Gold	Silver	Bronze
Changquan	Wang Ziwen (CHN)	Sou Cho Man (MAC)	Mia Tian (USA)
Jianshu / Qiangshu	Li Yi (MAC)	Zahra Kiani (IRI)	Pang Pui Yee (MAS)
Nanquan / Nandao	Tan Cheong Min (MAS)	Darya Latisheva (UZB)	Hanieh Rajabi (IRI)
Taolu All-Round (Taijiquan & Taijijian)	Hu Shuting (CHN)	Agatha Wong (PHI)	Choi Yujeong (KOR)

=== Women's sanda ===
Event	Gold	Silver	Bronze
Sanda 52 kg	Li Yueyao (CHN)	Edinea Prado Camargo (BRA)	Sumaya Munshi (KSA)
Sanda 60 kg	Wu Xiaowei (CHN)	Sarah Abduljawad (KSA)	Salome Yael Schumacher (SUI)
Sanda 60 kg	Shahrbanoo Mansourian (IRI)	Raine Cristina de Oliveira Martins (BRA)	Thokchom Menaka Devi (IND)
Sanda 60 kg	Shahrbanoo Mansourian (IRI)	Raine Cristina de Oliveira Martins (BRA)	Zainab Alghamdi (KSA)
