= Boxing at the 2013 World Combat Games =

Boxing competitions

Boxing at the 2013 World Combat Games was held at the Yubileiny - Sports Complex 'Yubileiny' Hall 1 in Saint Petersburg, Russia. Preliminary rounds took place on 20 and 22 October; all the medals were decided on 24 October.

== Medal table ==
Key:

* Host nation (Russia)

Rank	Nation	Gold	Silver	Bronze	Total
1	Russia (RUS)*	9	2	2	13
2	United States (USA)	1	2	5	8
3	Great Britain (GBR)	1	1	2	4
4	Uzbekistan (UZB)	1	1	1	3
5	Brazil (BRA)	1	0	1	2
6	Ukraine (UKR)	0	3	1	4
7	China (CHN)	0	2	2	4
8	Azerbaijan (AZE)	0	1	2	3
9	Romania (ROU)	0	1	1	2
10	Bulgaria (BUL)	0	0	4	4
11	Kyrgyzstan (KGZ)	0	0	2	2
12	Turkey (TUR)	0	0	1	1
Totals (12 entries)		13	13	24	50

== Medal summary ==
=== Men ===
Event	Gold	Silver	Bronze
49 kg	Valentin Chebochakov (RUS)	Wu Zonglin (CHN)	Enver Amiș (ROU)
49 kg	Valentin Chebochakov (RUS)	Wu Zonglin (CHN)	Leopoldo Martinez (USA)
52 kg	Shakhobidin Zoirov (UZB)	Viacheslav Tashkarakov (RUS)	Abdulrahman Shirinov (AZE)
52 kg	Shakhobidin Zoirov (UZB)	Viacheslav Tashkarakov (RUS)	Tinko Banabakov (BUL)
56 kg	Sergey Vodopyanov (RUS)	Zokhidjon Khurboev (UZB)	Stephen Fulton (USA)
56 kg	Sergey Vodopyanov (RUS)	Zokhidjon Khurboev (UZB)	Bektur Otogonow (KGZ)
60 kg	Viacheslav Shipunov (RUS)	Cresencio Ramos (USA)	Lyuben Todorov (BUL)
60 kg	Viacheslav Shipunov (RUS)	Cresencio Ramos (USA)	Adilet Bekeev (KGZ)
64 kg	Joedison Teixeira (BRA)	Aleksandr Grechiha (UKR)	Nicholas Jefferson (USA)
64 kg	Joedison Teixeira (BRA)	Aleksandr Grechiha (UKR)	Maxim Dadashev (RUS)
69 kg	Islam Edisultanov (RUS)	Elnur Suleymanov (AZE)	Tony Losey (USA)
69 kg	Islam Edisultanov (RUS)	Elnur Suleymanov (AZE)	Onur Şipal (TUR)
75 kg	Petr Khamukov (RUS)	Vladyslav Voitaliuk (UKR)	Danny Dignum (GBR)
75 kg	Petr Khamukov (RUS)	Vladyslav Voitaliuk (UKR)	Lucas Martins (BRA)
81 kg	Dmitry Bivol (RUS)	Andrés Sira (VEN)	Elvin Gambarov (AZE)
81 kg	Dmitry Bivol (RUS)	Andrés Sira (VEN)	Zukhriddin Makhkamov (UZB)
91 kg	Pavel Nikitaev (RUS)	Arseniy Azizov (UKR)	Josh Temple (USA)
91 kg	Pavel Nikitaev (RUS)	Arseniy Azizov (UKR)	Zhe Zhang (CHN)
+91 kg	Sergey Kuzmin (RUS)	Preda Marian (ROU)	Not awarded

=== Women ===
Event	Gold	Silver	Bronze
51 kg	Olesya Gladkova (RUS)	Marlen Esparza (USA)	Si Haijuan (CHN)
51 kg	Olesya Gladkova (RUS)	Marlen Esparza (USA)	Stoyka Petrova (BUL)
60 kg	Queen Underwood (USA)	Anastasia Belyakova (RUS)	Svetlana Staneva (BUL)
60 kg	Queen Underwood (USA)	Anastasia Belyakova (RUS)	Natasha Jonas (GBR)
75 kg	Savannah Marshall (GBR)	Li Qian (CHN)	Nila Lipska (UKR)
75 kg	Savannah Marshall (GBR)	Li Qian (CHN)	Yaroslava Yakushina (RUS)
