= Judo at the 2013 World Combat Games =

Judo competition

Judo Judo at the 2013 World Combat Games
- Venue: Petersburg Sports and Concert Complex
- Location: Saint Petersburg, Russia
- Dates: 19–20 October 2013

Competition at external databases
- Links: JudoInside

Judo, for the 2013 World Combat Games, took place at the Saint Petersburg Sports and Concert Complex Hall 1 in Saint Petersburg, Russia, on the 19 and 20 October 2013.

== Medal table ==
Key:

* Host nation (Russia)

Rank	Nation	Gold	Silver	Bronze	Total
1	Japan (JPN)	2	0	0	2
2	Brazil (BRA)	0	1	1	2
2	Mongolia (MGL)	0	1	1	2
4	Cuba (CUB)	0	0	1	1
4	Russia (RUS)*	0	0	1	1
Totals (5 entries)		2	2	4	8

== Medal summary ==
=== Men's team ===
Gold	Silver	Bronze
Japan; 73 kg Yasuhiro Ebi; 66 kg Shogo Maeno +90 kg Masaru Momose; 73 kg Ryo Saito; 81 kg Yuya Yoshida	Mongolia; 66 kg Battsetsegiin Batgerel; 90 kg Bunddorjiin Janchivdorj; 81 kg Gany Tüvshinjargal; 73 kg Ganbaataryn Odbayar +90 kg Namsraijavyn Batsuuri	Russia; 73 kg Denis Iartcev; 81 kg Sirazhudin Magomedov; 90 kg Iurii Panasenkov; 66 kg Mikhail Pulyaev +90 kg Renat Saidov
Japan; 73 kg Yasuhiro Ebi; 66 kg Shogo Maeno +90 kg Masaru Momose; 73 kg Ryo Saito; 81 kg Yuya Yoshida	Mongolia; 66 kg Battsetsegiin Batgerel; 90 kg Bunddorjiin Janchivdorj; 81 kg Gany Tüvshinjargal; 73 kg Ganbaataryn Odbayar +90 kg Namsraijavyn Batsuuri	Brazil; 73 kg Eduardo Barbosa; 66 kg Charles Chibana +90 kg Rafael Silva; 90 kg Eduardo da Silva; 81 kg Victor Penalber

- Brazil
- France
- Georgia
- Germany
- Japan
- Mongolia
- Russia
- Uzbekistan

=== Women's team ===
Gold	Silver	Bronze
Japan; 52 kg Natsumi Gomi; 57 kg Megumi Ishikawa; 63 kg Natsumi Katagiri; 70 kg Yuka Osumi +70 kg Nodoka Shiraishi	Brazil +70 kg Maria Suelen Altheman; 52 kg Érika Miranda; 70 kg Maria Portela; 63 kg Ana Carla Rios Grincevicus; 57 kg Rafaela Silva	Mongolia +70 kg Battulgyn Mönkhtuyaa; 57 kg Dorjsürengiin Sumiyaa; 52 kg Mönkhbatyn Urantsetseg; 70 kg Tsend-Ayuushiin Naranjargal; 63 kg Tsend-Ayuushiin Tserennadmid
Japan; 52 kg Natsumi Gomi; 57 kg Megumi Ishikawa; 63 kg Natsumi Katagiri; 70 kg Yuka Osumi +70 kg Nodoka Shiraishi	Brazil +70 kg Maria Suelen Altheman; 52 kg Érika Miranda; 70 kg Maria Portela; 63 kg Ana Carla Rios Grincevicus; 57 kg Rafaela Silva	Cuba; 52 kg Yanet Bermoy; 70 kg Onix Cortés; 57 kg Anailys Dorvigny; 63 kg Maricet Espinosa +70 kg Idalys Ortiz

- Brazil
- China
- Cuba
- France
- Japan
- Kazakhstan
- Mongolia
- Russia
