= Jujutsu at the 2013 World Combat Games =

Ju-jitsu, for the 2013 World Combat Games, was held at the Yubileiny - Sports Complex 'Yubileiny' Hall 2, in Saint Petersburg, Russia. Competitions took place on the 24 and 25 October 2013.

== Medal table ==
Key:

* Host nation (Russia)

Rank	Nation	Gold	Silver	Bronze	Total
1	Russia (RUS)*	7	3	0	10
2	Italy (ITA)	1	3	0	4
3	France (FRA)	1	1	2	4
4	Austria (AUT)	1	1	0	2
4	Germany (GER)	1	1	0	2
4	Iran (IRI)	1	1	0	2
4	Israel (ISR)	1	1	0	2
8	Poland (POL)	1	0	5	6
9	Netherlands (NED)	1	0	1	2
9	Romania (ROU)	1	0	1	2
11	Belgium (BEL)	1	0	0	1
11	Mexico (MEX)	1	0	0	1
13	Spain (ESP)	0	2	0	2
14	Sweden (SWE)	0	1	3	4
15	Colombia (COL)	0	1	1	2
15	Ukraine (UKR)	0	1	1	2
17	Denmark (DEN)	0	1	0	1
17	Switzerland (SUI)	0	1	0	1
19	Algeria (ALG)	0	0	1	1
19	Greece (GRE)	0	0	1	1
19	Kazakhstan (KAZ)	0	0	1	1
19	Slovenia (SLO)	0	0	1	1
Totals (22 entries)		18	18	18	54

== Medal summary ==
=== Men ===
Event	Gold	Silver	Bronze
Duo	Netherlands; Ruben Assmann; Marnix Bunnik	Spain; Francisco Javier Garcia Fernandez; Alberto Yague Camara	Colombia; Wilson Alzate Cortes; Javier Munoz Carrillo
Fighting 62 kg	Pavel Korzhavykh (RUS)	Francisco Garcia Fernandez (ESP)	Tileukabul Amanturlyev (KAZ)
Fighting 69 kg	Dmitrii Beshenetc (RUS)	Giovannibbattista Vitale (ITA)	Sebastien Marty (FRA)
Fighting 77 kg	Ilia Borok (RUS)	Fredrik Widgren (SWE)	Percy Kunsa Bi Aku (FRA)
Fighting 85 kg	Alexey Ivanov (RUS)	Ivan Nastenko (UKR)	Ali Smail (ALG)
Fighting 94 kg	Ilia Charkin (RUS)	Mohsen Hamidiaghchay (IRI)	Benjamin Lah (SLO)
Fighting +94 kg	Mojtaba Akbari (IRI)	Mikhail Smirnov (RUS)	Jacek Szewczak (POL)
Ne-Waza 70 kg	Oren-Shlomo Levin (ISR)	Fedor Serov (RUS)	Mariusz Abramiuk (POL)
Ne-Waza 85 kg	Dan Schon (MEX)	David Ben Zaken (ISR)	Karol Dzieniszewski (POL)
Ne-Waza +85 kg	Camil Dragos Moldoveanu (ROU)	Abdel Hakim Djabali (FRA)	Christos-Chrant Kelletzian (GRE)

=== Women ===
Event	Gold	Silver	Bronze
Duo	Austria; Mirneta Bećirović; Mirnesa Bećirović	Switzerland; Alexandra Erni; Antonia Erni	Sweden; Malin Kristina Persson; Maria Therese Westermark
Fighting 55 kg	Martyna Bieronska (POL)	Jessica Scricciolo (ITA)	Anastasiia Nastenko (UKR)
Fighting 62 kg	Carina Waltraud Neupert (GER)	Charlotte Beyer (DEN)	Sara Widgren (SWE)
Fighting 70 kg	Alexandra Ivanova (RUS)	Laura Boco (ITA)	Emilia Mackowiak (POL)
Fighting +70 kg	Catherine Jacques (BEL)	Alla Paderina (RUS)	Jennie Marika Brolin (SWE)
Ne-Waza 58 kg	Oceane Talvard (FRA)	Elisabeth Olbert (AUT)	Martyna Bieronska (POL)
Ne-Waza 70 kg	Olga Medvedeva (RUS)	Madeline Choconta Rojas (COL)	Mona Lisa Elena Ion (ROU)

=== Mixed ===
Event	Gold	Silver	Bronze
Duo	Italy; Sara Paganini; Michele Vallieri	Germany; Tom Ismer; Dominika Zagorski	Netherlands; Ruben Assmann; Saskia Boomgaard
