= Kickboxing at the 2013 World Combat Games =

Kickboxing, for the 2013 World Combat Games were held at the Yubileiny - Sports Complex 'Yubileiny' Halls 1 and 2 in Saint Petersburg, Russia. The preliminary rounds took place on 21 and 23 October 2013. Medals were awarded on the 25 October 2013.

== Medal table ==
Key:

* Host nation (Russia)

Rank	Nation	Gold	Silver	Bronze	Total
1	Russia (RUS)*	5	1	1	7
2	Ireland (IRL)	2	1	1	4
3	Hungary (HUN)	2	1	0	3
4	Italy (ITA)	1	2	0	3
5	Bosnia and Herzegovina (BIH)	1	0	0	1
5	Norway (NOR)	1	0	0	1
7	Turkey (TUR)	0	2	2	4
8	Iran (IRI)	0	1	2	3
8	Jordan (JOR)	0	1	2	3
10	Brazil (BRA)	0	1	1	2
10	Vietnam (VIE)	0	1	1	2
12	Germany (GER)	0	1	0	1
13	South Africa (RSA)	0	0	3	3
14	Kyrgyzstan (KGZ)	0	0	2	2
15	Belgium (BEL)	0	0	1	1
15	Finland (FIN)	0	0	1	1
15	France (FRA)	0	0	1	1
15	Mexico (MEX)	0	0	1	1
15	Morocco (MAR)	0	0	1	1
15	Slovenia (SLO)	0	0	1	1
15	Ukraine (UKR)	0	0	1	1
15	United States (USA)	0	0	1	1
15	Uzbekistan (UZB)	0	0	1	1
Totals (23 entries)		12	12	24	48

== Medal summary ==
=== Men ===
Event	Gold	Silver	Bronze
Full Contact (-63.5 kg)	Gabor Gorbics (HUN)	Sergey Lipinets (RUS)	William Saidi (FRA)
Full Contact (-63.5 kg)	Gabor Gorbics (HUN)	Sergey Lipinets (RUS)	Ahmad Muflih Aljhran Akram (JOR)
Full Contact (-71 kg)	Nikita Selyanskiy (RUS)	Ahmad Ali Khalaf Hasan (JOR)	Stalbek Darkanbaev (KGZ)
Full Contact (-71 kg)	Nikita Selyanskiy (RUS)	Ahmad Ali Khalaf Hasan (JOR)	Jose Mariscal (USA)
Full Contact (-91 kg)	Aleksandr Dmitrenko (RUS)	Eugen Waigel (GER)	Hassan Amouei Taromsari (IRI)
Full Contact (-91 kg)	Aleksandr Dmitrenko (RUS)	Eugen Waigel (GER)	Rashit Amankulov (KGZ)
Low Kick (-67 kg)	Shamil Abdulmedzhidov (RUS)	Seyyedmasoud Derekeh (IRI)	Volodymyr Demchuk (UKR)
Low Kick (-67 kg)	Shamil Abdulmedzhidov (RUS)	Seyyedmasoud Derekeh (IRI)	Kenan Gunaydin (TUR)
Low Kick (-75 kg)	Khasan Khaliev (RUS)	Tadeu Da San Martino (BRA)	Khasankhon Baratov (UZB)
Low Kick (-75 kg)	Khasan Khaliev (RUS)	Tadeu Da San Martino (BRA)	Kadir Tastan (TUR)
Low Kick (-81 kg)	Igor Emkic (BIH)	Serhat Degermenci (TUR)	Aleksandr Drobinin (RUS)
Low Kick (-81 kg)	Igor Emkic (BIH)	Serhat Degermenci (TUR)	Fernando Dos Santos (BRA)
Point Fighting (-63 kg)	Adriano Passaro (ITA)	Richard Veres (HUN)	Desmond Leonard (IRL)
Point Fighting (-63 kg)	Adriano Passaro (ITA)	Richard Veres (HUN)	Ryan Donovan Phillips (RSA)
Point Fighting (-74 kg)	Laszlo Norbert Gombos (HUN)	Mark Anthony McDermott (IRL)	Tilen Zajc (SLO)
Point Fighting (-74 kg)	Laszlo Norbert Gombos (HUN)	Mark Anthony McDermott (IRL)	Sufyaan Morat (RSA)
Point Fighting (-84 kg)	Robbie Mc Menamey (IRL)	Neri Stella (ITA)	Raed Abdul Tuem Alah (JOR)
Point Fighting (-84 kg)	Robbie Mc Menamey (IRL)	Neri Stella (ITA)	Daniel Colorado (MEX)

=== Women ===
Event	Gold	Silver	Bronze
Full Contact (-56 kg)	Tonje Sorlie (NOR)	Thy Tuyet Mai Nguyen (VIE)	Camilla Susanna Viksten (FIN)
Full Contact (-56 kg)	Tonje Sorlie (NOR)	Thy Tuyet Mai Nguyen (VIE)	Lamyae Sdassi (MAR)
Low Kick (-52 kg)	Anna Poskrebysheva (RUS)	Zehra Gulgen (TUR)	Farinaz Lari (IRI)
Low Kick (-52 kg)	Anna Poskrebysheva (RUS)	Zehra Gulgen (TUR)	Thi Tuyet Dung Nguyen (VIE)
Point Fighting (-60 kg)	Shauna Martina Bannon (IRL)	Gloria De Bei (ITA)	Nadia Bayett (RSA)
Point Fighting (-60 kg)	Shauna Martina Bannon (IRL)	Gloria De Bei (ITA)	Evelyn Helene Erwin Neyens (BEL)
