= Wushu at the 2013 World Combat Games =

- Venue: Spartak - Sports Complex 'Arena'
- Dates: 25-26 October, 2013

The wushu event at the 2013 World Combat Games took place at the Spartak - Sports Complex 'Arena', in Saint Petersburg, Russia. The competition took place on the 25 and 26 October 2013. There were taolu and sanshou events for male and female athletes.

== Medal table ==
Key:

* Host nation (Russia)

Rank	Nation	Gold	Silver	Bronze	Total
1	China (CHN)	4	3	1	8
2	Russia (RUS)*	4	2	0	6
3	Iran (IRI)	3	1	2	6
4	Egypt (EGY)	1	0	2	3
5	Indonesia (INA)	1	0	0	1
6	France (FRA)	0	2	1	3
7	Hong Kong (HKG)	0	1	5	6
8	Malaysia (MAS)	0	1	1	2
9	Canada (CAN)	0	1	0	1
9	Romania (ROU)	0	1	0	1
9	Ukraine (UKR)	0	1	0	1
12	Venezuela (VEN)	0	0	3	3
13	Singapore (SIN)	0	0	1	1
13	Turkey (TUR)	0	0	1	1
Totals (14 entries)		13	13	17	43

== Medal summary ==
=== Taolu ===
==== Men ====
Event	Gold	Silver	Bronze
Changquan / Daoshu / Gunshu	Lei Yu (CHN)	Semen Udelov (RUS)	Leung Man Chun (HKG)
Taijiquan + Taijijian	Huang Yingqi (CHN)	Loh Choon How (MAS)	Lee Tze Yuan (SIN)

==== Women ====
Event	Gold	Silver	Bronze
Changquan / Jianshu / Qiangshu	Daria Tarasova (RUS)	Liu Xia (CHN)	Zheng Tianhui (HKG)
Taijiquan + Taijijian	Lindswell Kwok (INA)	Li Jianfang (CHN)	Chan Lu Yi (MAS)

=== Sanda ===
==== Men ====
Event	Gold	Silver	Bronze
Sanda 60 kg	Rustam Kakraev (RUS)	Wei Cai (CHN)	Sone Wai Li (HKG)
Sanda 60 kg	Rustam Kakraev (RUS)	Wei Cai (CHN)	Ali Yousefi (IRN)
Sanda 65 kg	Jafar Shirzadeh (IRI)	Dylan Sakho (FRA)	Ting Kai Wong (HKG)
Sanda 65 kg	Jafar Shirzadeh (IRI)	Dylan Sakho (FRA)	Ismail Inci (TUR)
Sanda 70 kg	Ismail Aliev (RUS)	Traian Augustin Rus (ROU)	Praveen Robin Biswakarma (HKG)
Sanda 70 kg	Ismail Aliev (RUS)	Traian Augustin Rus (ROU)	Masoud Fazeli (IRI)
Sanda 75 kg	Mojtaba Hosseinzadeh (IRI)	Gadzhi Nuritdinov (RUS)	Jesus Rafael Licet (VEN)
Sanda 80 kg	Muslim Salikhov (RUS)	Nacereddine Zemmal (CAN)	Ashraf Mohamed Abdelgawad Abdelhamid (EGY)
Sanda 80 kg	Muslim Salikhov (RUS)	Nacereddine Zemmal (CAN)	Fodhil Sofien Saidani (FRA)
Sanda 85 kg	Hamid Reza Ladvar (IRI)	Dmytro Batok (UKR)	Aly Mohamed Ahmed Aly Ibrahim (EGY)
Sanda 90 kg	Mohamed Youssef (EGY)	Arman Baziari (IRI)	Shuaiwu Jin (CHN)
Sanda 90 kg	Mohamed Youssef (EGY)	Arman Baziari (IRI)	Carlos Jose Salazar Romero (VEN)

==== Women ====
Event	Gold	Silver	Bronze
Sanda 52 kg	Peipei Zuo (CHN)	Ho Yee Chao (HKG)	Not awarded
Sanda 60 kg	Xuetao Yuan (CHN)	Valerie Domergue (FRA)	Francelys del Valle Rivero Leonice (VEN)
