= 2013 World Combat Games =

II World Combat Games
- Host city: Saint Petersburg, Russia
- Nations: 97 + World Team
- Events: 135 in 15 sports
- Opening: October 18, 2013
- Closing: October 26, 2013
- Opened by: Vladimir Putin
- Main venue: Petrovsky Stadium

The 2013 World Combat Games were held in Saint Petersburg, Russia, from October 18 to 26, 2013.

== Venues ==
Venue Name	Sports
SCC Peterburg (Hall )	Aikido, Judo, Wrestling
SCC Peterburg (Hall 2)	Fencing, Kendo, Sumo,
Yubileiny (Arena 1)	Jujitsu, Kickboxing, Savate
Yubileiny (Arena 2)	Boxing, Kickboxing, Muaythai, sanda
Spartak	Karate, Sambo, Taekwondo, Wushu talou

== Games ==
=== Opening ceremony ===
The opening ceremony was officially opened on October 18, 2013 at 20:30-22:00 local time.

=== Sports ===
Compared to the 5 sports and 38 events in the Olympic Games, the 2013 Combat Games featured 15 sports and 135 events throughout the 9 days of the competition, with added disciplines in some events. The 2013 Combat Games comprised more sports and events than the last one, as 12 sports and 136 events were in 2010. Fencing and Savate made their debut at these Games. Aikido, however, is the sole demonstration sport here.

- Boxing
- Fencing
- Judo
- Ju-Jitsu
- Karate
- Kendo
- Kickboxing
- Muaythai
- Sambo
- Savate
- Sumo
- Taekwondo
- Wrestling
- Wushu

== Schedule ==
OC	Opening ceremony	●	Event competitions	D	Demo	1	Event finals	CC	Closing ceremony

October	18 Fri	19 Sat	20 Sun	21 Mon	22 Tue	23 Wed	24 Thu	25 Fri	26 Sat	Gold Medal
Ceremonies	OC								CC	
Aikido				D	D					
Boxing			●		●		13			13
Fencing							2	2	2	6
Judo		1	1							2
Ju-jitsu							9	9		18
Karate			6	6						12
Kendo				4	2					6
Kickboxing				●		●		12		12
Muaythai		●		●		11				11
Sambo	3	3								6
Savate		●	3		8					11
Sumo	4	4								8
Taekwondo						●	2			2
Wrestling						5	5	5		15
Wushu								●	13	13
Total Gold Medal	7	8	10	10	10	16	31	28	15	135
Cumulative Total	7	15	25	35	45	61	92	120	135	
October	18 Fri	19 Sat	20 Sun	21 Mon	22 Tue	23 Wed	24 Thu	25 Fri	26 Sat	Gold Medal

== Participating nations ==
A total of 97 national teams came to compete in these Games. The number of athletes for each nation are in the brackets. However, a World Team was created for all three team wrestling events.

- Afghanistan (1)
- Algeria (3)
- Argentina (12)
- Armenia (1)
- Australia (17)
- Austria (5)
- Azerbaijan (14)
- Belarus (17)
- Belgium (11)
- Bolivia (1)
- Bosnia and Herzegovina (1)
- Brazil (36)
- Bulgaria (17)
- Canada (22)
- Chile (7)
- Chinese Taipei (7)
- Colombia (9)
- Republic of the Congo (2)
- Costa Rica (1)
- Croatia (14)
- Cuba (7)
- Cyprus (1)
- Denmark (3)
- Dominican Republic (8)
- Egypt (13)
- El Salvador (2)
- Estonia (5)
- Finland (9)
- France (71)
- Georgia (9)
- Germany (24)
- Great Britain (14)
- Greece (6)
- Guatemala (2)
- Honduras (1)
- Hong Kong (12)
- Hungary (20)
- India (6)
- Indonesia (4)
- Iraq (5)
- Ireland (6)
- Iran (35)
- Israel (6)
- Italy (46)
- Japan (45)
- Jordan (4)
- Kazakhstan (20)
- Kyrgyzstan (13)
- Latvia (2)
- Lebanon (4)
- Libya (1)
- Lithuania (3)
- Luxembourg (2)
- Madagascar (6)
- Malaysia (8)
- Mauritius (2)
- Mexico (11)
- Mongolia (19)
- Montenegro (1)
- Morocco (20)
- Netherlands (14)
- New Zealand (15)
- Nigeria (2)
- Norway (4)
- China (35)
- Peru (1)
- Poland (30)
- Portugal (4)
- South Korea (34)
- Moldova (4)
- Romania (16)
- Russia (172) Host
- Senegal (7)
- Serbia (16)
- Singapore (6)
- Slovakia (4)
- Slovenia (10)
- South Africa (8)
- Spain (19)
- Swaziland (1)
- Sweden (16)
- Switzerland (6)
- Tajikistan (3)
- Thailand (9)
- Togo (1)
- Trinidad and Tobago (1)
- Tunisia (6)
- Turkey (17)
- Ukraine (53)
- United States (48)
- Uruguay (7)
- Uzbekistan (20)
- Venezuela (22)
- Vietnam (9)

Reference: 2013 World Combat Games List of Participating Countries (Click the "Athletes" tab for the list)

== Medal table ==
Key: Final medal tally below.

* Host nation (Russia)

Rank	Nation	Gold	Silver	Bronze	Total
1	Russia (RUS)*	47	20	26	93
2	France (FRA)	12	8	9	29
3	Japan (JPN)	11	5	4	20
4	Iran (IRI)	6	4	7	17
5	China (CHN)	5	6	6	17
6	Ukraine (UKR)	4	16	14	34
7	Italy (ITA)	3	10	4	17
8	Hungary (HUN)	3	4	1	8
9	South Korea (KOR)	3	2	5	10
10	Thailand (THA)	3	2	2	7
11	Azerbaijan (AZE)	3	1	2	6
12	Poland (POL)	2	1	8	11
13	Egypt (EGY)	2	1	4	7
14	Croatia (CRO)	2	1	2	5
14	Great Britain (GBR)	2	1	2	5
16	Ireland (IRL)	2	1	1	4
17	Mexico (MEX)	2	0	1	3
18	Norway (NOR)	2	0	0	2
19	United States (USA)	1	4	10	15
20	Romania (ROU)	1	3	5	9
21	Germany (GER)	1	3	3	7
22	Mongolia (MGL)	1	3	2	6
23	Turkey (TUR)	1	2	7	10
24	Brazil (BRA)	1	2	6	9
25	Serbia (SRB)	1	2	4	7
26	Belarus (BLR)	1	2	3	6
26	Sweden (SWE)	1	2	3	6
28	Israel (ISR)	1	1	2	4
28	Uzbekistan (UZB)	1	1	2	4
30	Austria (AUT)	1	1	0	2
30	Estonia (EST)	1	1	0	2
32	Kyrgyzstan (KGZ)	1	0	5	6
32	Venezuela (VEN)	1	0	5	6
34	Netherlands (NED)	1	0	2	3
35	Belgium (BEL)	1	0	1	2
35	Lithuania (LTU)	1	0	1	2
37	Bosnia and Herzegovina (BIH)	1	0	0	1
37	Indonesia (INA)	1	0	0	1
37	Peru (PER)	1	0	0	1
40	Spain (ESP)	0	3	0	3
41	Bulgaria (BUL)	0	2	5	7
42	Canada (CAN)	0	2	4	6
43	Congo (CGO)	0	2	0	2
44	Hong Kong (HKG)	0	1	5	6
45	Australia (AUS)	0	1	2	3
45	Colombia (COL)	0	1	2	3
45	Jordan (JOR)	0	1	2	3
45	Morocco (MAR)	0	1	2	3
45	Slovenia (SLO)	0	1	2	3
50	Malaysia (MAS)	0	1	1	2
50	Moldova (MDA)	0	1	1	2
50	Vietnam (VIE)	0	1	1	2
53	Armenia (ARM)	0	1	0	1
53	Denmark (DEN)	0	1	0	1
53	Latvia (LAT)	0	1	0	1
53	Switzerland (SUI)	0	1	0	1
57	Finland (FIN)	0	0	3	3
57	South Africa (RSA)	0	0	3	3
59	Kazakhstan (KAZ)	0	0	2	2
60	Algeria (ALG)	0	0	1	1
60	Argentina (ARG)	0	0	1	1
60	Chinese Taipei (TPE)	0	0	1	1
60	Cuba (CUB)	0	0	1	1
60	Georgia (GEO)	0	0	1	1
60	Greece (GRE)	0	0	1	1
60	New Zealand (NZL)	0	0	1	1
60	Singapore (SIN)	0	0	1	1
60	Tunisia (TUN)	0	0	1	1
Totals (68 entries)		135	132	203	470
