= World Combat Games =

International multi-sport event

- Purpose: Multi-sport event for martial arts and combat sports
- Inaugurated: 2010 World Combat Games in Beijing, China
- Most recent: 2023 World Combat Games in Riyadh, Saudi Arabia

The World Combat Games (GAISF World Combat Games / SportAccord World Combat Games) is an international multi-sport event featuring combat sports and martial arts. The games were founded by the Global Association of International Sports Federations (GAISF), now known as SportAccord, as a way of bringing various martial arts and combative sports to an international audience. The World Combat Games are also accompanied by a cultural program that reflects the ancient traditions and values of martial arts, as well as their contribution to modern society. The games are recognised by the International Olympic Committee.

In 2019, it was announced the World Combat Games would be held quadrennially. The host and venue for the 2027 World Combat Games has not been announced.

== Games ==
Edition	Year	Host city	Host country	Sports	Events	Best
1	2010	Beijing	China	12	118	Russia
2	2013	Saint Petersburg	Russia	15	135	Russia
cancelled	2019	Taipei	Taiwan			
cancelled	2021	Astana	Kazakhstan			
3	2023	Riyadh	Saudi Arabia	16	202	Ukraine
4	2027	Jakarta	Indonesia			

Cancelled

== Sports ==
Sports (2010, 2013: 15; since 2023: 16)

1. Aikido at the World Combat Games
2. Armwrestling at the World Combat Games (Since 2023)
3. Boxing at the World Combat Games
4. Fencing at the World Combat Games
5. Judo at the World Combat Games
6. Ju-jitsu at the World Combat Games
7. Karate at the World Combat Games
8. Kendo at the World Combat Games
9. Kickboxing at the World Combat Games
10. Muaythai at the World Combat Games
11. Sambo at the World Combat Games (Russian Wrestling)
12. Savate at the World Combat Games (French Boxing)
13. Sumo at the World Combat Games
14. Taekwondo at the World Combat Games
15. Wrestling at the World Combat Games (Traditional Wrestling:GR, PK, GP, AL, KK)
16. Wushu at the World Combat Games

Paralympians with physical, intellectual and visual impairments:

1. Aikido (since 2023)
2. Muaythai (since 2023)
3. Armwrestling (since 2023)
4. Ju-Jitsu (since 2023)
5. Sambo (since 2023)
6. Savate (since 2023)

== History ==
=== World Combat Games 2010 ===
The first World Combat Games was held 2010 in Beijing, with competitions for boxing, judo, ju-jitsu, karate, kendo, kickboxing, sanshou, Muay Thai, sambo, sumo, taekwondo, wrestling, wushu, and an aikido demonstration. Over 1000 athletes from all five continents participated. About the same number of volunteers helped to deliver the event. During the eight days of competitions 118 gold medals were awarded. Medals were won by 60% of the nations taking part in the Games, and also by not traditional combat sports nations. Russia lead the medal table with 18 gold medals, followed by China (15) and Ukraine (7).

=== World Combat Games 2013 ===
The second World Combat Games were held in Saint Petersburg. In these Games, the sports of savate and fencing made their debut. Russia dominated the medal table, with 47 gold medals.

=== World Combat Games 2019 ===
The demise of the SportAccord organisation, following a dispute with the International Olympic Committee and the SportAccord president Marius Vizer led to a temporary halt on the World Combat Games. The successor organisation, Global Association of International Sports Federations or GAISF took over the organisation of the event, and signed heads of agreement in November 2017 with official from Chinese Taipei for a 2019 edition of the event. However, it proved impossible to organise within the time frame, and the 2019 was shelved, with the intention of relaunching the event in 2021.

=== World Combat Games 2021 ===
On May 10, 2019, GAISF announced that Nur-Sultan, Kazakhstan's capital city, had been awarded the 2021 World Combat Games. The Games will take place from May 3 to 9 in the capital city, which had recently been renamed from Astana. At the announcement, GAISF announced that event would henceforth adhere to a quadrennial timescale, with the next event, as yet unawarded, planned for 2025.

=== World Combat Games 2023 ===
16 Sports:

1. Aikido at the 2023 World Combat Games (0) (1 Demonstration Events) (Include Para Teams)
2. Armwrestling at the 2023 World Combat Games (20 + 8 Para Event)
3. Boxing at the 2023 World Combat Games (8)
4. Fencing at the 2023 World Combat Games (12)
5. Judo at the 2023 World Combat Games (1 Mixed Team Event)
6. Ju-jitsu at the 2023 World Combat Games (14 + 4 Para Event)
7. Karate at the 2023 World Combat Games (12)
8. Kendo at the 2023 World Combat Games (2) (4 Demonstration Events)
9. Kickboxing at the 2023 World Combat Games (12)
10. Muaythai at the 2023 World Combat Games (17 + 2 Para Event)
11. Sambo at the 2023 World Combat Games (10 + 1 Mixed Team Event + 1 Para Event)
12. Savate at the 2023 World Combat Games (12 + 1 Mixed Team Event + 1 Para Event)
13. Sumo at the 2023 World Combat Games (8)
14. Taekwondo at the 2023 World Combat Games (3 + 1 Mixed Team Event)
15. Wrestling at the 2023 World Combat Games (36)
16. Wushu at the 2023 World Combat Games (16)

Total : (182 + 4 Mixed Team Event + 16 Para Event) + (5 Demonstration Events) = 202 + 5 = 207

==== Results ====
1. Aikido:
2. Armwrestling:
3. Boxing:
4. Fencing:
5. Judo:
6. Jujitsu:
7. Karate:
8. Kendo:
9. Kickboxing:
10. Muaythai:
11. Sambo:
12. Savate:
13. Sumo:
14. Taekwondo:
15. Wresting:
16. Wushu:

==== Medals ====
Complete Medals:

1. Ukraine
2. Saudi Arabia
3. Kazakhstan

== Medal table ==
Rank	Nation	Gold	Silver	Bronze	Total
1	Russia	65	31	36	132
2	China	20	9	19	48
3	France	19	13	16	48
4	Japan	17	17	11	45
5	Ukraine	11	21	25	57
6	Italy	10	11	9	30
7	Iran	9	8	9	26
8	Thailand	7	5	4	16
9	Azerbaijan	6	1	3	10
10	Poland	5	3	18	26
Totals (10 entries)		169	119	150	438

== See also ==
- SportAccord
- SportAccord World Mind Games
- Philippines at the 2023 World Combat Games
