= List of 1993 World Games medal winners =

The 1993 World Games were held in The Hague, Netherlands, from July 22 to August 2, 1993.

== Acrobatic gymnastics ==
Event	Gold	Silver	Bronze
Men's pair balance	Russia; Igor Strizhanov; Vladimir Lebedev	China; Chen Yun; Chen Baohuang	Bulgaria; Vladimir Vladev; Rumen Latchkov
Men's pair tempo	China; Chen Yun; Chen Baohuang	Russia; Igor Strizhanov; Vladimir Lebedev	Bulgaria; Vladimir Vladev; Rumen Latchkov
Men's pair overall	China; Chen Yun; Chen Baohuang	Shared gold	Bulgaria; Vladimir Vladev; Rumen Latchkov
Men's pair overall	Russia; Igor Strizhanov; Vladimir Lebedev	Shared gold	Bulgaria; Vladimir Vladev; Rumen Latchkov
Men's group balance	Bulgaria; Stefan Nikolov; Teodor Georgiev; Pavlin Nikolov; Yulian Vassilev	Germany; Henry Krumb; Michael Büttel; Manuel Messer; David Müllmann	France; René Montaudoin; Thierry Maussier; Hugo Chal de Beauvais; Fabrice Berthet
Men's group tempo	Bulgaria; Stefan Nikolov; Teodor Georgiev; Pavlin Nikolov; Yulian Vassilev	Germany; Henry Krumb; Michael Büttel; Manuel Messer; David Müllmann	France; René Montaudoin; Thierry Maussier; Hugo Chal de Beauvais; Fabrice Berthet
Men's group overall	Bulgaria; Stefan Nikolov; Teodor Georgiev; Pavlin Nikolov; Yulian Vassilev	China; Zhu Senchao; Liu Ruinxin; Lu Weiping; Yao Yingen	France; René Montaudoin; Thierry Maussier; Hugo Chal de Beauvais; Fabrice Berthet
Women's pair balance	Bulgaria; Gergana Beltcheva; Miroslava Ivanova	Ukraine; Marina Redkovolosova; Natalya Antipova	Portugal; Paula Afonso; Rita Alexandre
Women's pair tempo	Bulgaria; Gergana Beltcheva; Miroslava Ivanova	Shared gold	Belarus; Marina Lobanova; Ina Drachuk
Women's pair tempo	Ukraine; Marina Redkovolosova; Natalya Antipova	Shared gold	Belarus; Marina Lobanova; Ina Drachuk
Women's pair overall	Bulgaria; Gergana Beltcheva; Miroslava Ivanova	Ukraine; Marina Redkovolosova; Natalya Antipova	Portugal; Paula Afonso; Rita Alexandre
Women's group balance	Bulgaria; Marusia Ivanova; Miglena Pankova; Krasimira Petrova	Shared gold	Belarus; Tatiana Butova; Svetlana Moshnina; Elena Kirpota
Women's group balance	Poland; Agnieszka Mrozowicz; Marzena Pawliszyn; Joanna Chmielewska	Shared gold	China; Luo Tingting; Sun Xiaohong; Zhao Li
Women's group tempo	Bulgaria; Marusia Ivanova; Miglena Pankova; Krasimira Petrova	Shared gold	Belgium; Sally Van Renterghem; Patricia Voet; Sofie De Mey
Women's group tempo	Poland; Agnieszka Mrozowicz; Marzena Pawliszyn; Joanna Chmielewska	Shared gold	Belgium; Sally Van Renterghem; Patricia Voet; Sofie De Mey
Women's group overall	Bulgaria; Marusia Ivanova; Miglena Pankova; Krasimira Petrova	Shared gold	China; Luo Tingting; Sun Xiaohong; Zhao Li
Women's group overall	Poland; Agnieszka Mrozowicz; Marzena Pawliszyn; Joanna Chmielewska	Shared gold	China; Luo Tingting; Sun Xiaohong; Zhao Li
Mixed pair balance	China; He Weiguang; Ting Yan	Russia; Eduard Perelygin; Oksana Perelygina	Bulgaria; Ivaylo Katsov; Borislava Stankova
Mixed pair tempo	China; He Weiguang; Ting Yan	Lithuania; Sergejus Jeriomkinas; Jana Plotnikova	Ukraine; Stanislav Kosakovski; Olessya Oliynyk
Mixed pair overall	China; He Weiguang; Ting Yan	Ukraine; Stanislav Kosakovski; Olessya Oliynyk	Bulgaria; Ivaylo Katsov; Borislava Stankova

== Artistic roller skating ==
Event	Gold	Silver	Bronze
Men's free skating	Heath Mederios; United States	Jayson Sutcliffe; Australia	Samo Kokorovec; Italy
Women's free skating	Anna Cocco; Italy	Dezera Salas; United States	Laure Bourguignon; France
Pairs	Italy; Patrick Venerucci; Maura Ferri	United States; David DeMotte; Dezera Salas	Argentina; Flavio Fissolo; Gabi Múgica
Dance	United States; Doug Wait; Deanna Monahan	Italy; Roberto Stanzani; Alessandra Lanzoni	Italy; Franco Culcasi; Annamaria Culcasi

== Beach volleyball ==
Event	Gold	Silver	Bronze
Men	France; Jean-Philippe Jodard; Christian Penigaud	Australia; Andy Burdin; Julien Prosser	Brazil; Eduardo Garrido; Roberto Moreira
Women	Brazil; Mônica Rodrigues; Adriana Samuel	Netherlands; Heleen Crielaard; Lilian Crielaard	Great Britain; Audrey Cooper; Claire Paterson

== Bodybuilding ==
Event	Gold	Silver	Bronze
Men's 70 kg	Eduard Derzapf; Germany	Kim Jun-ho; South Korea	Anwar El-Amawy; Egypt
Men's 80 kg	Azman Abdullah; Singapore	Patrice Linguet; France	Ray Williams; Canada
Men's 90 kg	Ian Dowe; Great Britain	Gustav Ander; Sweden	Jouni Herranen; Finland
Men's +90 kg	Glenn Gravenbeek; Netherlands	Svend Karlsen; Norway	Gene Howell; United States
Women's 52 kg	Andrulla Blanchette; Great Britain	Quah Jee Jong; Singapore	Ina Lopulissa; Netherlands
Women's 57 kg	Martha Sánchez; Mexico	Maria Aicher; Germany	Elena Sesana; Italy
Women's +57 kg	Conny Plösser; Germany	Gunilla Söderberg; Sweden	Linda Forbin; France

== Bowling ==
Event	Gold	Silver	Bronze
Men's singles	Tomas Leandersson; Sweden	Yvan Augustin; France	Paeng Nepomuceno; Philippines
Women's singles	Pauline Smith; Great Britain	Lisa Kwan; Malaysia	Oh Hyun-mi; South Korea
Mixed doubles	Finland; Mika Koivuniemi; Pauliina Aalto	Sweden; Tomas Leandersson; Åsa Larsson	France; Yvan Augustin; Isabelle Saldjian

== Casting ==
Event	Gold	Silver	Bronze
Men's fly accuracy	Hywel Morgan; Great Britain	Wiebold Visser; Germany	Knut Meel; Norway
Men's fly distance single handed	Thomas Maire; Germany	Patrik Lexa; Czech Republic	Olaf Christensen; Norway
Men's fly distance double handed	Thomas Maire; Germany	Wiebold Visser; Germany	Patrik Lexa; Czech Republic
Men's multiplier accuracy	Steve Rajeff; United States	Chris Korich; United States	Henrik Österberg; Sweden
Men's spinning accuracy	Henrik Österberg; Sweden	Heinz Hensge; Germany	Steve Rajeff; United States
Men's spinning accuracy arenberg target	Bjørn Roger Larsen; Norway	Olaf Christensen; Norway	Henrik Österberg; Sweden
Men's spinning distance single handed	Knut Meel; Norway	Chris Korich; United States	Harvey Beck; Canada
Women's fly accuracy	Tina Bagge; Germany	Michaela Křížová; Czech Republic	Bente Skyrud; Norway
Women's fly distance single handed	Michaela Křížová; Czech Republic	Kathrin Werner; Germany	Bente Skyrud; Norway
Women's multiplier accuracy	Mona Warntorp; Sweden	Tina Bagge; Germany	Bente Skyrud; Norway
Women's spinning accuracy	Kathrin Werner; Germany	Mona Warntorp; Sweden	Michaela Křížová; Czech Republic
Women's spinning accuracy arenberg target	Michaela Křížová; Czech Republic	Bente Skyrud; Norway	Kathrin Werner; Germany
Women's spinning distance single handed	Bente Skyrud; Norway	Tina Bagge; Germany	Kathrin Werner; Germany

== Field archery ==
Event	Gold	Silver	Bronze
Men's recurve	Andrea Parenti; Italy	Paul Vermeiren; Belgium	Martinus Grov; Norway
Men's compound	Morgan Lundin; Sweden	Dominique Guyon; France	Jean-Paul Laury; France
Men's barebow	Twan Cleven; Netherlands	Roy Mundon; Great Britain	Mattias Fallgren; Sweden
Women's recurve	Monica Angeli; Italy	Catherine Pellen; France	Lisa Andersson; Sweden
Women's compound	Catherine Chapelain; France	Carmen Ceriotti; Italy	Fabiola Palazzini; Italy
Women's barebow	Patricia Lovell; Great Britain	Marie Palm; Sweden	Anna Maria Bianchi; Italy

== Finswimming ==
Event	Gold	Silver	Bronze
Men's 100 m surface	Luca Tonelli; Italy	David Landi; Italy	Sami Sorri; Finland
Men's 200 m surface	Luca Tonelli; Italy	Stephan Part; Austria	Sven Gallasch; Germany
Men's 400 m surface	Edwin Kanters; Netherlands	Martin Bočinský; Czech Republic	Anders Thomsen; Denmark
Men's 50 m apnoea	David Landi; Italy	Ari Palve; Finland	Sami Sorri; Finland
Men's 100 m immersion	Ari Palve; Finland	Sami Sorri; Finland	Sven Gallasch; Germany
Men's 4 × 100 m surface relay	Italy; Roberto Fiorucci; David Landi; Andrea Mangherini; Luca Tonelli	Finland; Janne Mikkola; Ari Palve; Sami Sorri; Janne Toivola	Denmark; Jesper Drøscher; Flemming Hjorth; Bo Jacobsen; Anders Thomsen
Men's 4 × 200 m surface relay	Denmark; Jesper Drøscher; Flemming Hjorth; Bo Jacobsen; Anders Thomsen	Finland; Janne Mikkola; Ari Palve; Sami Sorri; Janne Toivola	Czech Republic; Martin Bočinský; Petr Bořek; Alex Čeřovský; Kamil Maršálek
Women's 100 m surface	Lorena Baldi; Italy	Kristiina Nurk; Estonia	Beáta Bőmisch; Hungary
Women's 200 m surface	Kristiina Nurk; Estonia	Marika Themeli; Sweden	Zsuzsa Csík; Hungary
Women's 400 m surface	Myriam Villette; France	Kristiina Nurk; Estonia	Marika Themeli; Sweden
Women's 50 m apnoea	Zuzana Mandíková; Czech Republic	Lorena Baldi; Italy	Beáta Bőmisch; Hungary
Women's 100 m immersion	Myriam Villette; France	Astrid Bernard; Estonia	Céline Carel; France
Women's 4 × 100 m surface relay	Estonia; Anneli Bendi; Astrid Bernard; Chris-Helin Kokk; Kristiina Nurk	Hungary; Beáta Bőmisch; Beáta Bozsó; Zsuzsa Csík; Angéla Jurik	France; Céline Carel; Élodie Chaigneau; Anne-Marie Pelotte; Myriam Villette
Women's 4 × 200 m surface relay	Hungary; Beáta Bőmisch; Beáta Bozsó; Zsuzsa Csík; Angéla Jurik	Italy; Monica Babini; Lorena Baldi; Milena Pierotti; Denise Riccardi	France; Céline Carel; Élodie Chaigneau; Anne-Marie Pelotte; Myriam Villette

== Fistball ==
Event	Gold	Silver	Bronze
Men	Germany; Kai Baumann; Martin Becker; Andreas Bernhardt; Ralf Kallmeyer; Stefan Lebert; Dirk Schachtsiek; Roland Schiep; Holger Siebler	Switzerland; Martin Bodenmann; Hanspeter Brigger; Philippe Bucher; Reto Egolf; Stephan Jundt; Martin Oberle; Guido Pelizzoni; Christian Schluep	Austria; Adolf Haslbauer; Christoph Linsinger; Günter Schneider; Martin Seidl; Andreas Sigmund; Hubert Stadlbauer; Andreas Woitsch; Norbert Zauner

== Inline speed skating ==
Event	Gold	Silver	Bronze
Men's 300 m time trial	Tony Muse; United States	Luca Antoniel; Italy	Derek Parra; United States
Men's 500 m sprint	Tony Muse; United States	Luca Antoniel; Italy	Derek Parra; United States
Men's 5000 m mass start	Arnaud Gicquel; France	Derek Parra; United States	Chris Luxton; Australia
Men's 10000 m points	Derek Parra; United States	Arnaud Gicquel; France	Chris Luxton; Australia
Men's 20000 m elimination	Armando Capannolo; Italy	Arnaud Gicquel; France	John Dyett-Carthew; New Zealand
Women's 300 m time trial	Desly Hill; Australia	Anne Titze; Germany	Heather Laufer; United States
Women's 500 m sprint	Hilde Goovaerts; Belgium	Luana Pilia; Italy	María Eva Richardson; Argentina
Women's 3000 m mass start	Anne Titze; Germany	Desly Hill; Australia	Caroline Lagrée; France
Women's 5000 m points	Caroline Lagrée; France	Araceli Larrea; Spain	Heather Laufer; United States
Women's 10000 m elimination	Anne Titze; Germany	Antonella Mauri; Italy	Hilde Goovaerts; Belgium

== Karate ==
Event	Gold	Silver	Bronze
Men's kata	Ryoki Abe; Japan	Pasquale Acri; Italy	Laurent Riccio; France
Men's kumite 60 kg	Norimassa Fujita; Japan	Veysel Buğur; Turkey	Damien Dovy; France
Men's kumite 60 kg	Norimassa Fujita; Japan	Veysel Buğur; Turkey	Peter Overbeck; Germany
Men's kumite 65 kg	Murat Uysal; Germany	Michaël Braun; France	Jeffrey Snel; Netherlands
Men's kumite 65 kg	Murat Uysal; Germany	Michaël Braun; France	Stein Rønning; Norway
Men's kumite 70 kg	Junichi Watanabe; Japan	Massimiliano Oggianu; Italy	William Thomas; Great Britain
Men's kumite 70 kg	Junichi Watanabe; Japan	Massimiliano Oggianu; Italy	Ronny Rivano; Netherlands
Men's kumite 75 kg	Wayne Otto; Great Britain	Gabriel Berg; Sweden	Saeid Ashtian; Iran
Men's kumite 75 kg	Wayne Otto; Great Britain	Gabriel Berg; Sweden	Ali Aktepe; Netherlands
Men's kumite 80 kg	Augustus Paul; Great Britain	Miko Virkola; Finland	Sami Tiainen; Finland
Men's kumite 80 kg	Augustus Paul; Great Britain	Miko Virkola; Finland	Peter Bathoorn; Netherlands
Men's kumite +80 kg	Marc Hamon; Canada	Ian Cole; Great Britain	Hans Roovers; Netherlands
Men's kumite +80 kg	Marc Hamon; Canada	Ian Cole; Great Britain	Pierre Amman; Switzerland
Men's kumite openweight	Rob Mol; Netherlands	Marc Hamon; Canada	Rogier Alken; Netherlands
Men's kumite openweight	Rob Mol; Netherlands	Marc Hamon; Canada	Reza Mohseni; Sweden
Women's kata	Yuki Mimura; Japan	Simone Schreiner; Germany	Catherine Bernard; France
Women's kumite 53 kg	Yvonne Senff; Netherlands	Marise Mazurier; France	Sari Laine; Finland
Women's kumite 53 kg	Yvonne Senff; Netherlands	Marise Mazurier; France	Jillian Toney; Great Britain
Women's kumite 60 kg	Molly Samuel; Great Britain	Annelies Bouma; Netherlands	Irene Lyel; Austria
Women's kumite 60 kg	Molly Samuel; Great Britain	Annelies Bouma; Netherlands	Sari Nybäck; Finland
Women's kumite +60 kg	Karin Olsson; Sweden	Nurhan Fırat; Turkey	Janice Francis; Great Britain
Women's kumite +60 kg	Karin Olsson; Sweden	Nurhan Fırat; Turkey	Yukiko Yoneda; Japan

== Korfball ==
Event	Gold	Silver	Bronze
Mixed	Netherlands; Jiska Brandt; Jitte Bukkens; Jan de Jager; Angelique Klompmaker; René Kruse; Benno Landkroon; Hans Leeuwenhoek; Oscar Mulders; Joyce Smits; Ron Steenbergen; Jacqueline van Beek; Jeanette van Beek; Margo van der Singel; Frits Wip	Belgium; Jerry Aerts; Nancy Baele; Marc Benoy; Chantal De Colle; Tanja De Greves; Eva De Mulder; Ivo Goossens; Leen Mattheyses; Chris Pauwels; Sonja Roels; Steve Roels; Adriaan Van Bavel; Viviane Verbeeck; Wim Verhoeven	Germany; Peter Altmann; Marianne Büsing; Ragea Cramer; Thorsten Cramer; Hans-Georg Felder; Gabriele Gunkel; Carsten Koniczny; Thomas Kupka; Jürgen Marquart; Jörg Mehlmann; Christiane Reinhard; Gabrielle Schroll; Melanie Sponholz; Alexandra Teussner

== Lifesaving ==
Event	Gold	Silver	Bronze
Men's 200 m obstacle	Bart Reymen; Belgium	Burkhard Hole; Germany	Maurizio Gentili; Italy
Men's 50 m manikin carry	Marcello Saporiti; Italy	Fabrizio Caratti; Italy	Andreas Fischer; Germany
Men's 100 m manikin carry fins	Klaus Hermes; Germany	Burkhard Hole; Germany	Wolfgang Resch; Germany
Men's 100 m rescue medley	Marcello Saporiti; Italy	Fabrizio Caratti; Italy	Andreas Fischer; Germany
Men's 4 × 25 m manikin carry relay	Italy; Fabrizio Caratti; Maurizio Gentili; Mauro Locchi; Marcello Saporiti	Germany; Andreas Fischer; Burkhard Hole; Wolfgang Resch; Thomas Zachert	Sweden; Patrik Andersson; Hans Bergqvist; Per Mattsson; Lars Olsson
Men's 4 × 50 m medley relay	Germany	Italy	Spain
Men's 4 × 50 m rescue tube relay	Italy	Germany	Belgium; Vincent Honet; Kris Kenis; Kurt Raes; Bart Reymen
Men's 2 × 2 rescue ball relay	Sweden	South Africa	Great Britain
Women's 200 m obstacle	Melanie Mohnke; Germany	Cristina Bernardini; Italy	Christine Hole; Germany
Women's 50 m manikin carry	Carmen Geissler; Germany	Tiziana Molfini; Italy	Jolanda van Dalen; Netherlands
Women's 100 m manikin carry fins	Carmen Geissler; Germany	Bettina Lange; Germany	Christine Hole; Germany
Women's 100 m rescue medley	Cari Johansson; Sweden	Carmen Geissler; Germany	Bettina Lange; Germany
Women's 4 × 25 m manikin carry relay	Germany; Carmen Geissler; Christine Hole; Bettina Lange; Sabine Schnell	Netherlands; Conzuela Navest; Dianne Niën; Jolanda van Dalen; Hanneke van Staden	Sweden; Tina Angelbäck; Marika Jacobsson; Cari Johansson; Anette Nääs
Women's 4 × 50 m medley relay	Germany	Italy	Sweden
Women's 4 × 50 m rescue tube relay	Germany	Sweden	South Africa
Women's 2 × 2 rescue ball relay	Sweden	Italy	Great Britain

== Netball ==
Event	Gold	Silver	Bronze
Women	Australia; Jenny Borlase; Nicole Cusack; Carissa Dalwood; Keeley Devery; Liz Ellis; Michelle Fielke; Kathryn Harby; Sue Kenny; Simone McKinnis; Shelley O'Donnell; Catriona Wagg; Vicki Wilson	New Zealand; Julie Carter; Tanya Cox; Robin Dillimore; Margaret Foster; Sheryl George; Sonya Hardcastle; Joan Hodson; Bernice Mene; Leilani Read; Teresa Tairi; Carron Topping; Linda Vagana	Jamaica; Charmaine Aldridge; Angeline Campbell; Karen Clarke; Connie Francis; Ann-Marie Grant; Karlene Hamilton; Marva Lindsay; Jennifer McDonald; Patricia McDonald; Oberon Pitterson; Natalie Tucker; Andrea Watson

== Pétanque ==
Event	Gold	Silver	Bronze
Men's triples	France; Christian Fazzino; Jean-Marc Foyot; Daniel Monard	Belgium; Alain Van Caeneghem; Michel Van Campenhout; Charles Weibel	Denmark; Bo Fuglsang; Brian Fuglsang; Peter Fuglsang
Women's doubles	France; Aline Dole; Ranya Kouadri	Sweden; Lotta Brohult; Christel Eriksson	Germany; Denise Pektor; Stefanie Schwarzbach

== Powerlifting ==
Event	Gold	Silver	Bronze
Men's lightweight	Gerard McNamara; Ireland	Rodney Hypolite; Great Britain	Sergey Zhuravlev; Russia
Men's middleweight	Frank Schramm; Germany	Hsieh Yi-ching; Chinese Taipei	Walt Forsey; Canada
Men's heavyweight	Gene Bell; United States	Viktor Naleikin; Ukraine	Brian Reynolds; Great Britain
Women's lightweight	Claudine Cognacq; Denmark	Raija Koskinen; Finland	Gema Cristóbal; Spain
Women's middleweight	Carrie Boudreau; United States	Beate Amdahl; Norway	Ingeborg Marx; Belgium
Women's heavyweight	Cathy Millen; New Zealand	Tammy Diande; United States	Shelby Corson; United States

== Racquetball ==
Event	Gold	Silver	Bronze
Men's singles	Michael Bronfeld; United States	John Ellis; United States	Sherman Greenfeld; Canada
Women's singles	Michelle Gould; United States	Malia Bailey; United States	Carol McFetridge; Canada

== Roller hockey ==
Event	Gold	Silver	Bronze
Men	Portugal	Argentina	Spain

== Sambo ==
Event	Gold	Silver	Bronze
Men's 52 kg	Namsrain Baatarbold; Mongolia	Abram Agamiryan; Russia	Raibek Mendigaliyev; Kazakhstan
Men's 57 kg	Kalek Akmaliev; Kazakhstan	Sergey Zadorin; Russia	Eduardas Rudas; Lithuania
Men's 62 kg	Sergey Ignatenko; Russia	Andrey Savenkov; Kazakhstan	Yakim Rankov; Bulgaria
Men's 68 kg	Ivan Netov; Bulgaria	Valery Belov; Russia	José León; Spain
Men's 74 kg	Nikolay Igrushkin; Russia	Mihails Zakoljapins; Latvia	Algis Mečkovskis; Lithuania
Men's 82 kg	Khusein Khaibulaev; Russia	Petras Mažeika; Lithuania	Igor Dudich; Belarus
Men's 90 kg	Aleksandr Dunaev; Russia	Tsvetomir Petrov; Bulgaria	Ron Angus; Canada
Men's 100 kg	Vladimir Rumiantsev; Russia	Ričardas Rocevičius; Lithuania	Todor Todorov; Bulgaria
Men's +100 kg	Vladimir Emelianov; Belarus	Murat Khasanov; Russia	Algimantas Grybauskas; Lithuania

== Taekwondo ==
Event	Gold	Silver	Bronze
Men's 50 kg	Abror Haider; Denmark	Hsieh Yao-yuan; Chinese Taipei	Younes Sekkat; Morocco
Men's 50 kg	Abror Haider; Denmark	Hsieh Yao-yuan; Chinese Taipei	David Montalvo; United States
Men's 54 kg	Seo Sung-kyo; South Korea	Marc Nghi Hoang; France	Tareq Abu-Sbeitan; Jordan
Men's 54 kg	Seo Sung-kyo; South Korea	Marc Nghi Hoang; France	Emmanuel Ogu; Nigeria
Men's 58 kg	Gabriel Esparza; Spain	Joey Febres; United States	Cheng Shao-hung; Chinese Taipei
Men's 58 kg	Gabriel Esparza; Spain	Joey Febres; United States	Django Tapilatu; Netherlands
Men's 64 kg	Francisco Zas; Spain	Kim Jung-ho; South Korea	Colin Madigan; Great Britain
Men's 64 kg	Francisco Zas; Spain	Kim Jung-ho; South Korea	Abderrahim El-Khattab; Morocco
Men's 70 kg	Óscar Sánchez; Spain	Ercan Özkuru; Germany	Hassan Hassan; Kuwait
Men's 70 kg	Óscar Sánchez; Spain	Ercan Özkuru; Germany	Mustafa Mamnouh; Netherlands
Men's 76 kg	Jang Jong-oh; South Korea	Wei Cheng-hung; Chinese Taipei	Ahmed Zahran; Egypt
Men's 76 kg	Jang Jong-oh; South Korea	Wei Cheng-hung; Chinese Taipei	Hugo García; Mexico
Men's 83 kg	Víctor Estrada; Mexico	Paolo Borgato; Italy	Jos Bouwhuis; Netherlands
Men's 83 kg	Víctor Estrada; Mexico	Paolo Borgato; Italy	Billy Petrone; United States
Men's +83 kg	Kim Hyun-il; South Korea	Yahia Rashwan; Egypt	Olaf Wilkens; Germany
Men's +83 kg	Kim Hyun-il; South Korea	Yahia Rashwan; Egypt	Alan Pinontoan; Netherlands
Women's 47 kg	Lo Chun-mei; Chinese Taipei	Águeda Pérez; Mexico	Janet Vousden; Great Britain
Women's 47 kg	Lo Chun-mei; Chinese Taipei	Águeda Pérez; Mexico	Lalla El-Idrissi; Morocco
Women's 55 kg	Liu Chao-ching; Chinese Taipei	Idoya Jiménez; Spain	Sarah Maitimu; Netherlands
Women's 55 kg	Liu Chao-ching; Chinese Taipei	Idoya Jiménez; Spain	Darcy DeKriek; United States
Women's 65 kg	Cho Hyang-mi; South Korea	Mónica del Real; Mexico	Rozália Pákh; Canada
Women's 65 kg	Cho Hyang-mi; South Korea	Mónica del Real; Mexico	Mirjam Müskens; Netherlands
Women's +65 kg	Bettina Hipf; Germany	Dina El-Margany; Egypt	Mette Nejsum; Denmark
Women's +65 kg	Bettina Hipf; Germany	Dina El-Margany; Egypt	Sandra Martín; Spain

== Trampoline gymnastics ==
Event	Gold	Silver	Bronze
Men's individual	Fabrice Schwertz; France	Sergey Bukhovtsev; Ukraine	Martin von Stedingk; Sweden
Men's synchro	Germany; Christian Kemmer; Martin Kubicka	Sweden; Lars von Stedingk; Martin von Stedingk	Denmark; Anders Christiansen; Mads Ledstrup
Men's tumbling	Jon Beck; United States	Rayshine Harris; United States	Aleksey Kryzhanovsky; Russia
Women's individual	Sue Challis; Great Britain	Andrea Holmes; Great Britain	Nathalie Treil; France
Women's synchro	Great Britain; Sue Challis; Andrea Holmes	Germany; Sandra Beck; Hiltrud Roewe	Australia; Jackie Cully; Sallyann Proposch
Women's tumbling	Chrystel Robert; France	Tatyana Morozova; Belarus	Michelle Mara; United States

== Triathlon ==
Event	Gold	Silver	Bronze
Men's individual	Jan van der Marel; Netherlands	Eimert Venderbosch; Netherlands	Johan Boonstra; Netherlands
Men's team	Netherlands; Johan Boonstra; Jan van der Marel; Eimert Venderbosch	Belgium; Koen Hoeyberghs; Koenraad Jurgens; Dirk Van Gossum	Hungary
Women's individual	Mieke Suys; Belgium	Jacqueline van Vliet; Netherlands	Luciënne Groenendijk; Netherlands
Women's team	Netherlands; Luciënne Groenendijk; Jacqueline van Vliet	Belgium; Chantal Duck; Mieke Suys	Hungary

== Tug of war ==
Event	Gold	Silver	Bronze
Men's outdoor 640 kg	Switzerland; Joe Buckart; Paul Gander; Guido Leu; Andreas Murer; Peter Odermatt; Werner Odermatt; Alois Schuler; Bruno Vogler	Ireland; Hugh Conway; Seamus Greenan; Bill Kehoe; Dermot Kehoe; James Kehoe; Laurence Kehoe; Martin Kehoe; Ben McCrudden	Spain; Ignacio Arregi; Andoni Etxezarreta; Jesús Etxezarreta; José Ezama; José Gurrutxaga; Pedro Gurrutxaga; Sebastián Gurrutxaga; Miguel Urtuzaga
Men's outdoor 720 kg	Switzerland; Joe Buckart; Ruedi Durrer; Peter Koller; Guido Leu; Andreas Murer; Peter Odermatt; Hans Villiger; Bruno Vogler	Ireland; Seamus Greenan; Bill Kehoe; Dermot Kehoe; James Kehoe; Martin Kehoe; William Kehoe; Ben McCrudden; Billy Wall	Germany; Dietmar Broghammer; Engelbert Gut; Markus Hub; Benedikt Nägele; Engelbert Nägele; Josef Nägele; Markus Wunderle; Johannes Zipfel

== Water skiing ==
Event	Gold	Silver	Bronze
Men's jump	Oleg Deviatovski; Belarus	Patrice Martin; France	John Levingston; Australia
Men's slalom	John Battleday; Great Britain	John Levingston; Australia	Neil Ritchie; Australia
Men's tricks	Patrice Martin; France	Russell Gay; United States	Oleg Deviatovski; Belarus
Women's jump	Olga Pavlova; Belarus	Philippa Roberts; Great Britain	Kim DeMacedo; Canada
Women's slalom	Philippa Roberts; Great Britain	Natalia Rumyantseva; Russia	April Coble; United States
Women's tricks	Olga Pavlova; Belarus	Natalia Rumyantseva; Russia	Julia Gromyko; Belarus
