= Ju-jitsu at the 2001 World Games – Men's fighting −94 kg =

Ju-jitsu men's fighting −94 kg at the 2001 World Games
- Venue: Akita Prefectural Gymnasium, Akita, Japan
- Dates: 19 August 2001
- Competitors: 6 from 5 nations

Medalists
gold medal	(France) Kamal Temal
silver medal	(Spain) Pedro García
bronze medal	(Poland) Grzegorz Zimoląg

The men's fighting −94 kg competition in ju-jitsu at the 2001 World Games took place on 19 August 2001 at the Akita Prefectural Gymnasium in Akita, Japan.

== Competition format ==
A total of 6 athletes entered the competition. They fought in stepladder system.

== Results ==
=== Gold medal bracket ===
Quarterfinals
(Japan) Kazuo Sakakibara (JPN)	4
(Germany) Ralf Witzkowski (GER)	14
(Germany) Thomas Weidner (GER)	0
(Poland) Grzegorz Zimoląg (POL)	14

Semifinals
(Germany) Ralf Witzkowski (GER)	10
(France) Kamal Temal (FRA)	13
(Poland) Grzegorz Zimoląg (POL)	5
(Spain) Pedro García (ESP)	7

Final
(France) Kamal Temal (FRA)	14
(Spain) Pedro García (ESP)	0

=== Bronze medal bracket ===
Consolation round
(Japan) Kazuo Sakakibara (JPN)	0
(Poland) Grzegorz Zimoląg (POL)	14
(Germany) Thomas Weidner (GER)	0
(Germany) Ralf Witzkowski (GER)	14

Third place
(Poland) Grzegorz Zimoląg (POL)	11
(Germany) Ralf Witzkowski (GER)	9
