= Ju-jitsu at the 2001 World Games – Mixed duo =

Ju-jitsu mixed duo at the World Games
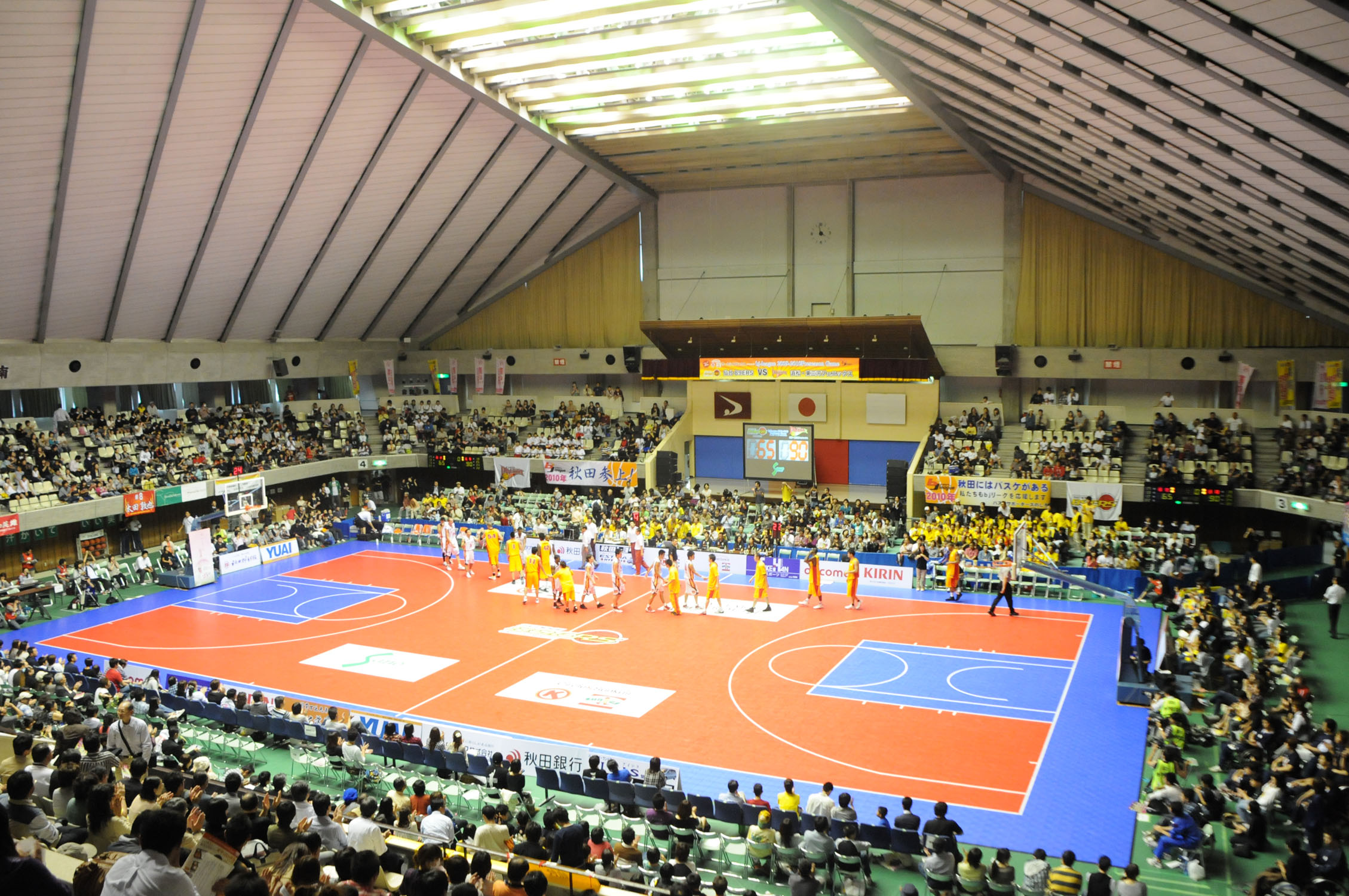
- Akita Prefectural Gymnasium
- Venue: Akita Prefectural Gymnasium
- Date: 20 August 2001
- Competitors: 12 from 6 nations

Medalists
1st place, gold medalist(s)		Miguel Martínez; Isabel Arroyo
2nd place, silver medalist(s)		Peter Florian; Gertraud Christ
3rd place, bronze medalist(s)		Frank Stjernholm; Camilla Prien

The mixed duo competition in ju-jitsu at the 2001 World Games took place on 20 August 2001 at the Akita Prefectural Gymnasium in Akita, Japan.

== Competition format ==
A total of sex duets entered the competition. They fought in stepladder system.

== Results ==
=== Gold medal bracket ===
Quarterfinals
(Austria) Daniel Hofmann (AUT) (Austria) Marion Tremel (AUT)	93
(Denmark) Frank Stjernholm (DEN) (Denmark) Camilla Prien (DEN)	90
(Spain) Miguel Martínez (ESP) (Spain) Isabel Arroyo (ESP)	21
(Netherlands) Barry van Bommel (NED) (Netherlands) Angelique Poort (NED)	-

Semifinals
(Austria) Daniel Hofmann (AUT) (Austria) Marion Tremel (AUT)	88
(Germany) Peter Florian (GER) (Germany) Gertraud Christ (GER)	91
(Spain) Miguel Martínez (ESP) (Spain) Isabel Arroyo (ESP)	91
(France) David Heiremans (FRA) (France) Marianne Deldicque (FRA)	89

Final
(Germany) Peter Florian (GER) (Germany) Gertraud Christ (GER)	89
(Spain) Miguel Martínez (ESP) (Spain) Isabel Arroyo (ESP)	92

=== Bronze medal bracket ===
Consolation round
(Denmark) Frank Stjernholm (DEN) (Denmark) Camilla Prien (DEN)	97
(France) David Heiremans (FRA) (France) Marianne Deldicque (FRA)	94
(Netherlands) Barry van Bommel (NED) (Netherlands) Angelique Poort (NED)
(Austria) Daniel Hofmann (AUT) (Austria) Marion Tremel (AUT)	WO

Third place
(Denmark) Frank Stjernholm (DEN) (Denmark) Camilla Prien (DEN)	96
(Austria) Daniel Hofmann (AUT) (Austria) Marion Tremel (AUT)	84
