= Ju-jitsu at the 2001 World Games – Men's fighting −85 kg =

International sporting event

Ju-jitsu men's fighting −85 kg at the 2001 World Games
- Venue: Akita Prefectural Gymnasium, Akita, Japan
- Dates: 20 August 2001
- Competitors: 6 from 6 nations

Medalists
gold medal	(Netherlands) Rob Haans
silver medal	(France) Thierry Grimaud
bronze medal	(Slovenia) Peter Bevc

The men's fighting −85 kg competition in ju-jitsu at the 2001 World Games took place on 20 August 2001 at the Akita Prefectural Gymnasium in Akita, Japan.

== Competition format ==
A total of 6 athletes entered the competition. They fought in stepladder system.

== Results ==
=== Gold medal bracket ===
Quarterfinals
(France) Thierry Grimaud (FRA)	9
(Sweden) Ricard Carneborn (SWE)	6
(Netherlands) Rob Haans (NED)	14
(Slovenia) Peter Bevc (SLO)	0

Semifinals
(France) Thierry Grimaud (FRA)	14
(Brazil) Roger Chesid (BRA)	0
(Netherlands) Rob Haans (NED)	14
(Poland) Marek Krajewski (POL)	0

Final
(France) Thierry Grimaud (FRA)	3
(Netherlands) Rob Haans (NED)	17

=== Bronze medal bracket ===
Consolation round
(Sweden) Ricard Carneborn (SWE)	14
(Poland) Marek Krajewski(POL)	0
(Slovenia) Peter Bevc (SLO)	14
(Brazil) Roger Chesid (BRA)	0

Third place
(Sweden) Ricard Carneborn (SWE)	3
(Slovenia) Peter Bevc (SLO)	8
