= Ju-jitsu at the 2001 World Games – Women's duo =

Ju-jitsu women's duo at the 2001 World Games
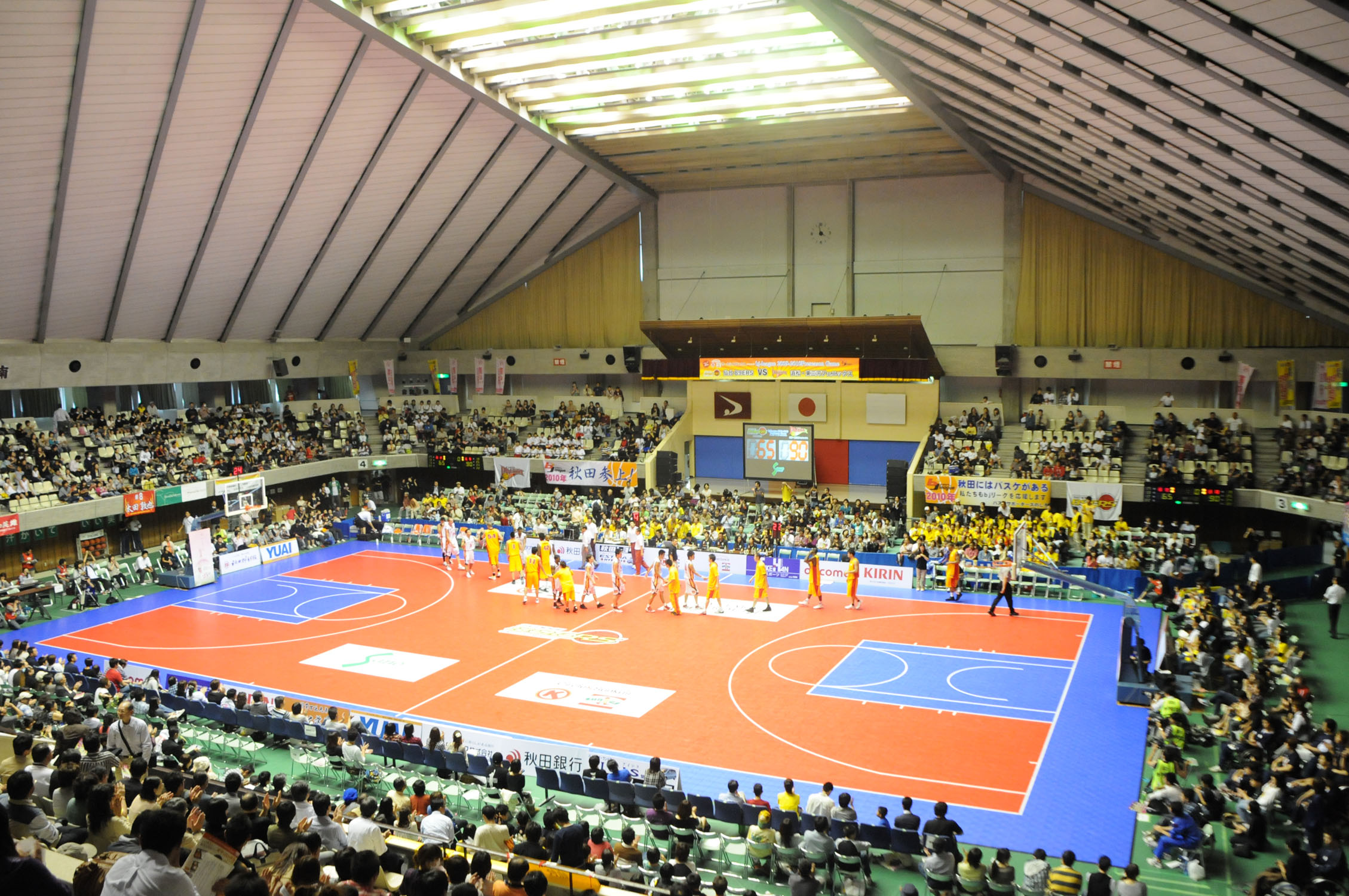
- Akita Prefectural Gymnasium
- Venue: Akita Prefectural Gymnasium
- Date: 20 August 2001
- Competitors: 12 from 6 nations

Medalists
| 1st place, gold medalist(s) | | Vibeke Mortensen; Karina Lauridsen | Denmark |
| 2nd place, silver medalist(s) | | Laetitia Deloris; Geraldine Dejardin | France |
| 3rd place, bronze medalist(s) | | Silvia Alvarez; Nuray Batman | Netherlands |

The women's duo competition in ju-jitsu at the 2001 World Games took place on 20 August 2001 at the Akita Prefectural Gymnasium in Akita, Japan.

== Competition format ==
A total of 6 duets entered the competition. They fought in stepladder system.

== Results ==
=== Gold medal bracket ===
Quarterfinals
(Netherlands) Silvia Alvarez (NED) (Netherlands) Nuray Batman (NED) | 85
(Germany) Stephanie Satory (GER) (Germany) Nadin Altmuller (GER) | 78
(Belgium) Vanessa Van de Vijver (BEL) (Belgium) Sandy van Landeghem (BEL) | 90
(Denmark) Vibeke Mortensen (DEN) (Denmark) Karina Lauridsen (DEN) | 91

Semifinals
(Netherlands) Silvia Alvarez (NED) (Netherlands) Nuray Batman (NED) | 90
(France) Laetitia Deloris (FRA) (France) Geraldine Dejardin (FRA) | 91
(Denmark) Vibeke Mortensen (DEN) (Denmark) Karina Lauridsen (DEN) | 87
(Switzerland) Marianne Schilliger (SUI) (Switzerland) Marlis Gloor (SUI) | 75

Final
(France) Laetitia Deloris (FRA) (France) Geraldine Dejardin (FRA) | 93
(Denmark) Vibeke Mortensen (DEN) (Denmark) Karina Lauridsen (DEN) | 95

=== Bronze medal bracket ===
Consolation round
(Germany) Stephanie Satory (GER) (Germany) Nadin Altmuller (GER) | 85
(Switzerland) Marianne Schilliger (SUI) (Switzerland) Marlis Gloor (SUI) | 72
(Belgium) Vanessa Van de Vijver (BEL) (Belgium) Sandy van Landeghem (BEL) | 87
(Netherlands) Silvia Alvarez (NED) (Netherlands) Nuray Batman (NED) | 89

Third place
(Germany) Stephanie Satory (GER) (Germany) Nadin Altmuller (GER) | 83
(Netherlands) Silvia Alvarez (NED) (Netherlands) Nuray Batman (NED) | 92
