= Ju-jitsu at the 2001 World Games =

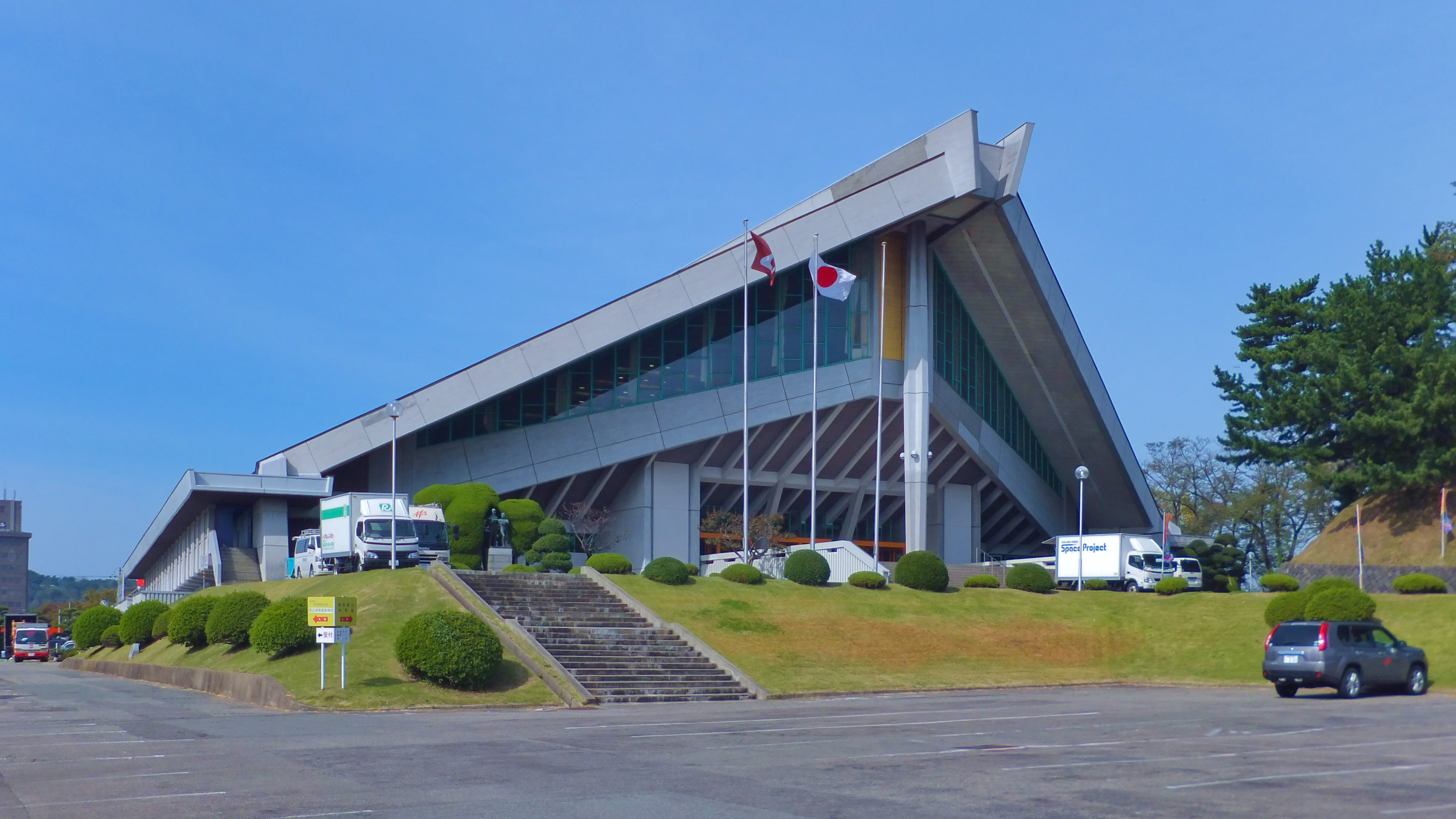
- Akita Prefectural Gymnasium
- Venue: Akita Prefectural Gymnasium
- Dates: 19–20 August 2001
- Competitors: 71 from 15 nations

The ju-jitsu events at the 2001 World Games in Akita was played between 19 and 20 August. 71 athletes, from 15 nations, participated in the tournament. The ju-jitsu competition took place at Akita Prefectural Gymnasium.

== Participating nations ==
- Austria (6)
- Belgium (4)
- Brazil (1)
- Denmark (9)
- France (12)
- Germany (11)
- Italy (1)
- Japan (3)
- Netherlands (10)
- Poland (2)
- Slovenia (1)
- Spain (5)
- Sweden (3)
- Switzerland (2)
- Uruguay (1)

== Medal table ==
| Rank | Nation | Gold | Silver | Bronze | Total |
|---|---|---|---|---|---|
| 1 | France | 4 | 3 | 0 | 7 |
| 2 | Netherlands | 2 | 1 | 2 | 5 |
| 3 | Denmark | 2 | 1 | 1 | 4 |
| 4 | Spain | 1 | 1 | 1 | 3 |
| 5 | Germany | 0 | 2 | 0 | 2 |
| 6 | Austria | 0 | 1 | 0 | 1 |
| 7 | Sweden | 0 | 0 | 2 | 2 |
| 8 | Belgium | 0 | 0 | 1 | 1 |
| 8 | Poland | 0 | 0 | 1 | 1 |
| 8 | Slovenia | 0 | 0 | 1 | 1 |
| Totals (10 entries) | | 9 | 9 | 9 | 27 |

== Events ==
=== Duo ===
| Event | Gold | Silver | Bronze |
|---|---|---|---|
| Men | France; Bruno Pereira; Jérôme Laurent | Germany; Andreas Richter; Raik Tietze | Belgium; Tom Jacobs; Wim Kersemans |
| Women | Denmark; Vibeke Mortensen; Karina Lauridsen | France; Läetitia Deloris; Géraldine Dejardin | Netherlands; Silvia Alvarez; Nuray Batman |
| Mixed | Spain; Miguel Martínez; Isabel Arroyo | Germany; Peter Florian; Gertraud Christ | Denmark; Frank Stjernholm; Camilla Prien |

=== Men's fighting ===
| Event | Gold | Silver | Bronze |
|---|---|---|---|
| −69 kg | Antonio Da Costa; France | Gerhard Ableidinger; Austria | Colin Kist; Netherlands |
| −77 kg | Didier Cezar; France | Michel van Rijt; Netherlands | Christer Öqvist; Sweden |
| −85 kg | Rob Haans; Netherlands | Thierry Grimaud; France | Peter Bevc; Slovenia |
| −94 kg | Kamal Temal; France | Pedro García; Spain | Grzegorz Zimoląg; Poland |

=== Women's fighting ===
| Event | Gold | Silver | Bronze |
|---|---|---|---|
| −62 kg | Patricia Hekkens; Netherlands | Jeanne Rasmussen; Denmark | Diana Gasco; Spain |
| −70 kg | Nicole Sydbøge; Denmark | Sophie Albert; France | Anna Dimberg; Sweden |
