= United Society of JuJitsu Organizations =

Jujitsu organization in the US

The United Society of JuJitsu Organizations (USJJO) is recognized by the Ju-Jitsu International Federation (JJIF) as the National Ju-Jitsu Member of the USA and as the governing body for Ju-Jitsu with JJIF. The JJIF is the recognized JuJitsu Organization to the Olympic Family World Games.

The United Society of Jujitsu Organizations is committed to developing self-defense and competitive Ju-Jitsu through the Ju-Jitsu International Federation (JJIF).

== History ==
The 2014 JJIF General Assembly voted for the United Society of Jujitsu Organizations to become the USA National Member. Members are able to take classes and seminars offered by the JJIF.

== Membership ==
The United Society of Jujitsu Organizations is the USA National Member of the JJIF. The JJIF is a member of the General Association of International Sport Federations (GAISF), member of International World Games Association (IWGA – part of the Olympic Movement together with the IOC) and affiliated to the Sport for All Federation (FISpT). Ju-Jitsu under JJIF rules has been an event at the World Games since the 1997 World Games in Lahti, Finland.

== Rules of Sport Ju-Jitsu ==
JJIF currently regulates three different types of competitions at the international level: the Duo system', Fighting system and Ne Waza.

=== Duo ===
The former is a discipline in which a pair of Jutsukas (Ju-Jitsu athlete) from the same team show possible self-defence techniques against a series of 12 attacks, randomly called by the mat referee from the 20 codified attacks to cover the following typologies: grip attack (or strangulation), embrace attack (or necklock), hit attack (punch or kick) and armed attack (stick or knife).

The Duo system has three competition categories: male, female or mixed, and the athletes are judged for their speed, accuracy, control and realism. It requires great technical preparation, timing and athletic qualities.

=== Fighting ===
With a different approach, the Fighting System is articulated in a one-on-one competition between athletes. The system is divided in several categories according to weight and sex

(Male categories: -55 kg, -62 kg, -69 kg, -77 kg, -85 kg, -94 kg, +94 kg; Female categories -48 kg, -55 kg, -62 kg, -70 kg, +70 kg).

The actual competition is divided in three phases (Parts): Part I sees the JuJutsukas involved in distance combat (controlled attacks with arms and legs and atemis of various nature - punches, strikes and kicks). Once a grab has been made the Fight enters Part II and hits are no longer allowed.

The jujutsukas try to bring one another down with various throwing techniques (and points are given according to how "clean" and effective the action was). Also - despite it not being very common - submission techniques as controlled strangulations and locks are allowed in part II.

Once down on the tatamis (mats) the match enters its Part III. Here points are given for immobilisation techniques, controlled strangulations or levers on body joints that bring the opponent to yield.

The winner is the Jutsuka who has accumulated most points during the fight. Automatic victory is assigned to the Jutsuka who gets an "Ippon" (clean action, full points) in all three Parts. This type of competition requires timing, agility, strength and endurance.

=== Ne-Waza ===
The ne-waza system is the newest of the official competition systems and is similar to Brazilian jiu-jitsu. The ne-waza fight starts in standing position, and the competitors try to gain points with several throwing, take-down and immobilization techniques, sweeps (changing from lower to upper position starting with a guard), or to win the fight ultimately with submission techniques. If no competitor ends the fight with a submission technique, the referee announces the competitor with the most points as winner.

The ne-waza system is parted by age (cadets - under 17, juniors under 20 and seniors), as well as belt ranks (only green to black belt are allowed to participate in international opens), gender and weight.

Weight categories in JJIF ne-waza system
age	sex	weight categories						
Cadets (U17)	male	-55 kg	-60 kg	-66 kg	-73 kg	-81 kg	-90 kg	+90 kg
Cadets (U17)	female	-44 kg	-48 kg	-52 kg	-57 kg	-63 kg	-70 kg	+70 kg
Juniors (U20); Seniors	female	-48 kg	-52 kg	-57 kg	-63 kg	-70 kg	-78 kg	+78 kg
Juniors (U20); Seniors	male	-60 kg	-66 kg	-73 kg	-81 kg	-90 kg	-100 kg	+100 kg

The contest duration is 4 minutes for cadets, 6 minutes for juniors and seniors (<=35 years) and 5 minutes for competitors from 36 years onwards.
