= Ju-jitsu at the 2001 World Games – Women's fighting −62 kg =

Fighting competition

Ju-jitsu women's fighting −62 kg at the 2001 World Games
- Venue: Akita Prefectural Gymnasium, Akita, Japan
- Dates: 20 August 2001
- Competitors: 6 from 6 nations

Medalists
gold medal	(Netherlands) Patricia Hekkens
silver medal	(Denmark) Jeanne Rasmussen
bronze medal	(Spain) Diana Gascó

The women's fighting −62 kg competition in ju-jitsu at the 2001 World Games took place on 20 August 2001 at the Akita Prefectural Gymnasium in Akita, Japan.

== Competition format ==
A total of 6 athletes entered the competition. They fought in stepladder system.

== Results ==
=== Gold medal bracket ===
Quarterfinals
(France) Emmanuelle Toucanne (FRA)	0
(Spain) Diana Gascó (ESP)	17
(Netherlands) Patricia Hekkens (NED)	14
(Austria) Petra Gasselich (AUT)	0

Semifinals
(Spain) Diana Gascó (ESP)	10
(Denmark) Jeanne Rasmussen (DEN)	12
(Netherlands) Patricia Hekkens (NED)	14
(Germany) Katrin Berger (GER)	0

Final
(Denmark) Jeanne Rasmussen (DEN)	0
(Netherlands) Patricia Hekkens (NED)	14

=== Bronze medal bracket ===
Consolation round
(France) Emmanuelle Toucanne (FRA)	14
(Germany) Katrin Berger (GER)	0
(Austria) Petra Gasselich (AUT)	0
(Spain) Diana Gascó (ESP)	18

Third place
(France) Emmanuelle Toucanne (FRA)	15
(Spain) Diana Gascó (ESP)	21
