= Ju-jitsu at the 2001 World Games – Women's fighting −70 kg =

Ju-jitsu women's fighting −70 kg at the 2001 World Games
- Venue: Akita Prefectural Gymnasium, Akita, Japan
- Dates: 20 August 2001
- Competitors: 6 from 6 nations

Medalists
gold medal	(Denmark) Nicole Sydbøge
silver medal	(France) Sophie Albert
bronze medal	(Sweden) Anna Dimberg

The women's fighting −70 kg competition in ju-jitsu at the 2001 World Games took place on 20 August 2001 at the Akita Prefectural Gymnasium in Akita, Japan.

== Competition format ==
A total of 6 athletes entered the competition. They fought in a stepladder system.

== Results ==
=== Gold medal bracket ===
Quarterfinals
(France) Sophie Albert (FRA)	14
(Germany) Sonja Kinz (GER)	0
(Netherlands) Judith de Weerd (NED)	0
(Denmark) Nicole Sydbøge (DEN)	14

Semifinals
(France) Sophie Albert (FRA)	14
(Sweden) Anna Dimberg (SWE)	0
(Denmark) Nicole Sydbøge (DEN)	15
(Spain) Francisca López (ESP)	3

Final
(France) Sophie Albert (FRA)	7
(Denmark) Nicole Sydbøge (DEN)	9

=== Bronze medal bracket ===
Consolation round
(Germany) Sonja Kinz (GER)	14
(Spain) Francisca López (ESP)	0
(Netherlands) Judith de Weerd (NED)	0
(Sweden) Anna Dimberg (SWE)	14

Third place
(Germany) Sonja Kinz (GER)	0
(Sweden) Anna Dimberg (SWE)	14
