= Ju-jitsu at the 1997 World Games =

- Dates: 15–17 August 1997

The Ju-jitsu competition at the World Games 1997 took place on August 15 to August 17 in Lahti, Finland.

== European Ju-Jitsu ==
=== Fighting System ===
==== Men's events ====
Category	Gold	Silver	Bronze
–62 kg	Jörn Meiners (GER)	Taco Morren (NED)	Jonatan Vega (ESP)
–72 kg	Johan Blomdahl (SWE)	Marc Marie-Louise (FRA)	Michel van Rijt (NED)
–82 kg	Bertrand Amoussou (FRA)	Ricard Carneborn (SWE)	Ben Rietdijk (NED)
–92 kg	Jean Guacide (FRA)	Joachim Göhrmann (GER)	Zlatko Rizvič (SLO)
+92 kg	Marcelo Figueiredo (BRA)	Christophe Barthez (FRA)	Wilfred Derks (NED)

==== Women's events ====
Category	Gold	Silver	Bronze
–58 kg	Esther Oostlander (NED)	Sandrine Bouland (FRA)	Sonia Gómez (ESP)
–68 kg	Petra Holzhausen (GER)	Anne Corvaisier (FRA)	Anna Dimberg (SWE)
+68 kg	Laurence Sionneau (FRA)	Jennie Brolin (SWE)	Pia Larsen (DEN)

=== Duo System ===
==== Duo Classic events ====
Category	Gold	Silver	Bronze
men	Barry van Bommel (NED); Marco Markus (NED)	Eric Candori (FRA); Stéphane Freshi (FRA)	Morgan Nordström (SWE); Kåre Nordström (SWE)
mixed	Antonio Da Costa (FRA); Minh-Minh Ngo (FRA)	Barry van Bommel (NED); Angelique Poort (NED)	Ferdinand Fuhrmann (AUT); Sabine Kampf (AUT)

== Links ==
=== External links ===
- Medal winners on ju-jutsu.se (archive)
