= Iran at the World Games =

Iran, officially the Islamic Republic of Iran is participating in World Games since 1993.

== Medal table ==
=== Medals by games ===
| Games | Gold | Silver | Bronze | Total | Rank |
|---|---|---|---|---|---|
| 1981–1989 | Did not participate | | | | |
| (Netherlands) 1993 The Hague | 0 | 0 | 1 | 1 | 45 |
| (Finland) 1997 Lahti | 0 | 0 | 1 | 1 | 44 |
| (Japan) 2001 Akita | 0 | 0 | 0 | 0 | — |
| (Germany) 2005 Duisburg | Did not participate | | | | |
| (Taiwan) 2009 Kaohsiung | 0 | 0 | 0 | 0 | — |
| (Colombia) 2013 Cali | 0 | 1 | 1 | 2 | 50 |
| (Poland) 2017 Wrocław | 2 | 8 | 1 | 11 | 24 |
| (United States) 2022 Birmingham | Did not participate | | | | |
| (China) 2025 Chengdu | 3 | 1 | 3 | 7 | 30 |
| Total | 5 | 10 | 7 | 22 | |

=== Medals by sport ===
| Sport | Gold | Silver | Bronze | Total |
|---|---|---|---|---|
| Archery | 0 | 1 | 0 | 1 |
| Cue sports | 0 | 0 | 1 | 1 |
| Roller sports | 0 | 0 | 1 | 1 |
| Ju-jitsu | 0 | 2 | 1 | 3 |
| Karate | 2 | 4 | 3 | 9 |
| Muaythai | 0 | 2 | 0 | 2 |
| Sport climbing | 1 | 0 | 0 | 1 |
| Wushu | 2 | 1 | 1 | 4 |
| Total | 5 | 10 | 7 | 22 |

== List of medalists ==
=== Official sports ===
| Medal | Name | Games | Sport | Event |
|---|---|---|---|---|
| Bronze | Saeid Ashtian | 1993 The Hague | Karate | Men's kumite 75 kg |
| Bronze | Alireza Katiraei | 1997 Lahti | Karate | Men's kumite 75 kg |
| Silver | Masoud Jalilvand | 2013 Cali | Ju-jitsu | Men's fighting 85 kg |
| Bronze | Mohsen Hamidi | 2013 Cali | Ju-jitsu | Men's fighting 94 kg |
| Gold | Zabihollah Pourshab | 2017 Wrocław | Karate | Men's kumite 84 kg |
| Gold | Reza Alipour | 2017 Wrocław | Sport climbing | Men's speed |
| Silver | Esmaeil Ebadi | 2017 Wrocław | Archery | Men's individual compound |
| Silver | Mohsen Hamidi | 2017 Wrocław | Ju-jitsu | Men's fighting 94 kg |
| Silver | Amir Mehdizadeh | 2017 Wrocław | Karate | Men's kumite 60 kg |
| Silver | Ali Asghar Asiabari | 2017 Wrocław | Karate | Men's kumite 75 kg |
| Silver | Sajjad Ganjzadeh | 2017 Wrocław | Karate | Men's kumite +84 kg |
| Silver | Hamideh Abbasali | 2017 Wrocław | Karate | Women's kumite +68 kg |
| Silver | Ali Zarinfar | 2017 Wrocław | Muaythai | Men's 63.5 kg |
| Silver | Masoud Minaei | 2017 Wrocław | Muaythai | Men's 71 kg |
| Bronze | Soheil Vahedi | 2017 Wrocław | Cue sports | Open snooker |
| Gold | Sara Bahmanyar | 2025 Chengdu | Karate | Women's kumite 50 kg |
| Gold | Shahin Banitalebi | 2025 Chengdu | Wushu | Men's nanquan and nangun |
| Gold | Yasaman Bagherzadeh | 2025 Chengdu | Wushu | Women's sanda 70 kg |
| Silver | Mohammad Reza Rigi | 2025 Chengdu | Wushu | Men's sanda 85 kg |
| Bronze | Reza Lesani | 2025 Chengdu | Freestyle inline skating | Men's speed slalom |
| Bronze | Saleh Abazari | 2025 Chengdu | Karate | Men's kumite +84 kg |
| Bronze | Soheila Mansourian | 2025 Chengdu | Wushu | Women's sanda 60 kg |

=== Invitational sports ===
| Medal | Name | Games | Sport | Event |
|---|---|---|---|---|
| Gold | Hamid Reza Gholipour | 2009 Kaohsiung | Wushu | Men's sanda 85 kg |
| Gold | Zahra Karimi | 2009 Kaohsiung | Wushu | Women's sanda 60 kg |
| Silver | Farshad Arabi | 2009 Kaohsiung | Wushu | Men's nanquan & nangun |
| Bronze | Maryam Tavakkoli | 2009 Kaohsiung | Wushu | Women's sanda 52 kg |
| Gold | Farshad Arabi | 2013 Cali | Wushu | Men's nanquan & nangun |
| Gold | Mohsen Mohammadseifi | 2013 Cali | Wushu | Men's sanda 65 kg |
| Gold | Javad Aghaei | 2013 Cali | Wushu | Men's sanda 75 kg |
| Gold | Hamid Reza Gholipour | 2013 Cali | Wushu | Men's sanda 85 kg |
| Bronze | Omid Nosrati | 2017 Wrocław | Kickboxing | Men's K1 86 kg |
