= Ju-jitsu at the 2001 World Games – Men's fighting −69 kg =

Ju-jitsu men's fighting −69 kg at the 2001 World Games
- Venue: Akita Prefectural Gymnasium, Akita, Japan
- Dates: 19 August 2001
- Competitors: 6 from 6 nations

Medalists
gold medal	(France) Antonio Da Costa
silver medal	(Austria) Gerhard Ableidinger
bronze medal	(Netherlands) Colin Kist

The men's fighting −69 kg competition in ju-jitsu at the 2001 World Games took place on 19 August 2001 at the Akita Prefectural Gymnasium in Akita, Japan.

== Competition format ==
A total of 6 athletes entered the competition. They fought in stepladder system.

== Results ==
=== Gold medal bracket ===
Quarterfinals
Colin Kist (NED)	6
Antonio Da Costa (FRA)	15
Yoshitomo Ando (JPN)	0
Gerhard Ableidinger (AUT)	15

Semifinals
Antonio Da Costa (FRA)	14
Christian Mattle (DEN)	0
Gerhard Ableidinger (AUT)	17
Luigi Maselli (ITA)	2

Final
Antonio Da Costa (FRA)	10
Gerhard Ableidinger (AUT)	6

=== Bronze medal bracket ===
Consolation round
Colin Kist (NED)	14
Luigi Maselli (ITA)	0
Yoshitomo Ando (JPN)	14
Christian Mattle (DEN)	0

Third place
Colin Kist (NED)	11
Yoshitomo Ando (JPN)	10
