= Ju-jitsu at the 2001 World Games – Men's duo =

Ju-jitsu men's duo at the 2001 World Games
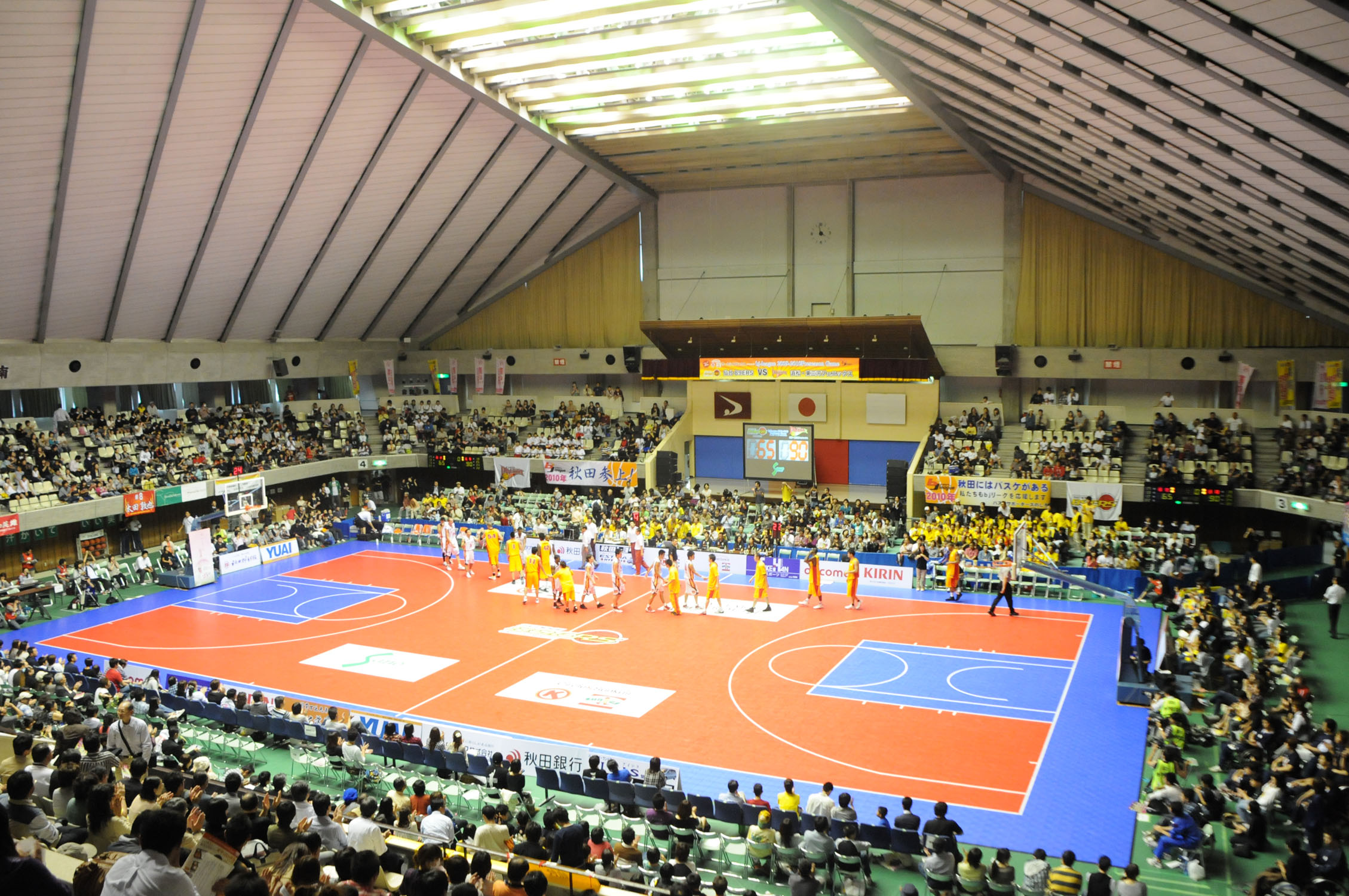
- Akita Prefectural Gymnasium
- Venue: Akita Prefectural Gymnasium
- Date: 19 August 2001
- Competitors: 12 from 6 nations

Medalists
1st place, gold medalist(s)		Bruno Pereira; Jérôme Laurent	France
2nd place, silver medalist(s)		Andreas Richter; Raik Tietze	Germany
3rd place, bronze medalist(s)		Tom Jacobs; Wim Kersemans	Belgium

The men's duo competition in ju-jitsu at the 2001 World Games took place on 19 August 2001 at the Akita Prefectural Gymnasium in Akita, Japan.

== Competition format ==
A total of 6 duets entered the competition. They fought in stepladder system.

== Results ==
=== Gold medal bracket ===
Quarterfinals
(Netherlands) Barry van Bommel (NED) (Netherlands) Bart Veth (NED)	83
(France) Bruno Pereira (FRA) (France) Jérôme Laurent (FRA)	89
(Germany) Andreas Richter (GER) (Germany) Raik Tietze (GER)	107
(Austria) Roman Bobits (AUT) (Austria) Ferdinand Fuhrmann (AUT)	106

Semifinals
(France) Bruno Pereira (FRA) (France) Jérôme Laurent (FRA)	112
(Denmark) Kent Hielscher (DEN) (Denmark) Thomas Darholt (DEN)	109
(Germany) Andreas Richter (GER) (Germany) Raik Tietze (GER)	93
(Belgium) Tom Jacobs (BEL) (Belgium) Wim Kersemans (BEL)	86

Final
(France) Bruno Pereira (FRA) (France) Jérôme Laurent (FRA)	97
(Germany) Andreas Richter (GER) (Germany) Raik Tietze (GER)	92

=== Bronze medal bracket ===
Consolation round
(Netherlands) Barry van Bommel (NED) (Netherlands) Bart Veth (NED)	128
(Belgium) Tom Jacobs (BEL) (Belgium) Wim Kersemans (BEL)	129
(Austria) Roman Bobits (AUT) (Austria) Ferdinand Fuhrmann (AUT)	92
(Denmark) Kent Hielscher (DEN) (Denmark) Thomas Darholt (DEN)	87

Third place
(Belgium) Tom Jacobs (BEL) (Belgium) Wim Kersemans (BEL)	92
(Austria) Roman Bobits (AUT) (Austria) Ferdinand Fuhrmann (AUT)	89
