= Aikido at the 2001 World Games =

- Venue: Akita Prefectural Gymnasium
- Date: 18 August 2001
- Competitors: 56 from 10 nations

Aikido was contested at the 2001 World Games as a demonstration sport, the third time it had been demonstrated at the World Games. As it was deemed a demonstration sport, no medals were awarded for the event.

== Participating nations ==
- Brazil (12)
- Chile (6)
- Chinese Taipei (8)
- France (5)
- Hong Kong (5)
- Macau (3)
- Malaysia (2)
- Mexico (2)
- Japan (6)
- Netherlands (7)
