= Powerlifting at the 1997 World Games – Men's middleweight =

Powerlifting men's middleweight at the 1997 World Games
- Venue: Lahti, Finland
- Date: 8 August 1997
- Competitors: 7 from 6 nations

Medalists
gold medal	(Indonesia) Petri Triharyanto
silver medal	(Ukraine) Dmitriy Soloviov
bronze medal	(Poland) Jan Wilczyński

The men's middleweight competition in powerlifting at the 1997 World Games took place on 8 August 1997 in Lahti, Finland.

== Competition format ==
A total of 7 athletes entered the competition. Each athlete had 3 attempts in each of 3 events: squat, bench press and deadlift. Athlete, who came with the biggest score in Wilks points is the winner.

== Results ==
Rank	Athlete	Nation	Weight	Squat	Bench press	Deadlift	Total weight	Total points
1st place, gold medalist(s)	Petri Triharyanto	Indonesia	75.6	300.0	192.5	290.0	782.5	554.47
2nd place, silver medalist(s)	Dmitriy Soloviov	Ukraine	77.6	300.0	207.5	285.0	792.5	551.81
3rd place, bronze medalist(s)	Jan Wilczyński	Poland	70.3	275.0	155.0	290.0	720.0	537.76
4	Jarmo Laine	Finland	74.1	285.0	180.0	282.5	747.5	537.15
5	Hsieh I-ching	Chinese Taipei	75.1	300.0	152.5	300.0	752.5	535.70
6	Vasiliy Kurtiak	Ukraine	81.5	285.0	182.5	312.5	780.0	526.42
	Jeff Butt	Canada	74.8	NM	-	-	DSQ	DSQ
