= Ukraine at the 1997 World Games =

Ukraine at the World Games 1997
- IOC code: UKR
- NOC: National Olympic Committee of Ukraine

in Lahti, Finland 7 – 17 August 1997
- Medals Ranked 11th: Gold 5 Silver 7 Bronze 0 Total 12

World Games appearances (overview)
- 1993; 1997; 2001; 2005; 2009; 2013; 2017; 2022; 2025

Ukraine competed at the 1997 World Games in Lahti, Finland, from 7 to 17 August 1997. Ukraine did not compete in squash.

== Medalists ==
=== Main programme ===
Medal	Name	Sport	Event
Gold	Ihor Kozhin; Oleksandr Volohdin	Trampoline gymnastics	Men's pairs tempo routine
Gold	Andriy Safonov; Yuriy Zaveryukha; Serhiy Pavlov; Dmytro Bain	Acrobatic gymnastics	Men's groups balance routine
Gold	Olena Moyseychea; Nadiia Surina; Viktoriya Zherdeva	Acrobatic gymnastics	Women's groups balance routine
Gold	Oxana Tsyhuleva; Olena Movchan	Trampoline gymnastics	Women's synchro
Gold	Olena Chabanenko	Trampoline gymnastics	Women's tumbling
Silver	Andriy Safonov; Yuriy Zaveryukha; Serhiy Pavlov; Dmytro Bain	Acrobatic gymnastics	Men's groups
Silver	Andriy Safonov; Yuriy Zaveryukha; Serhiy Pavlov; Dmytro Bain	Acrobatic gymnastics	Men's groups tempo routine
Silver	Olena Moyseychea; Nadiia Surina; Viktoriya Zherdeva	Acrobatic gymnastics	Women's groups
Silver	Olena Moyseychea; Nadiia Surina; Viktoriya Zherdeva	Acrobatic gymnastics	Women's groups tempo routine
Silver	Dmytro Soloviov	Powerlifting	Men's middleweight
Silver	Olena Movchan	Trampoline gymnastics	Women's individual
Silver	Olena Tkachuk	Weightlifting	Women's 83 kg

== External sources ==
- Results of the 1997 World Games
- Ukraine's medals at the 1997 World Games
