= List of World Games venues in muaythai =

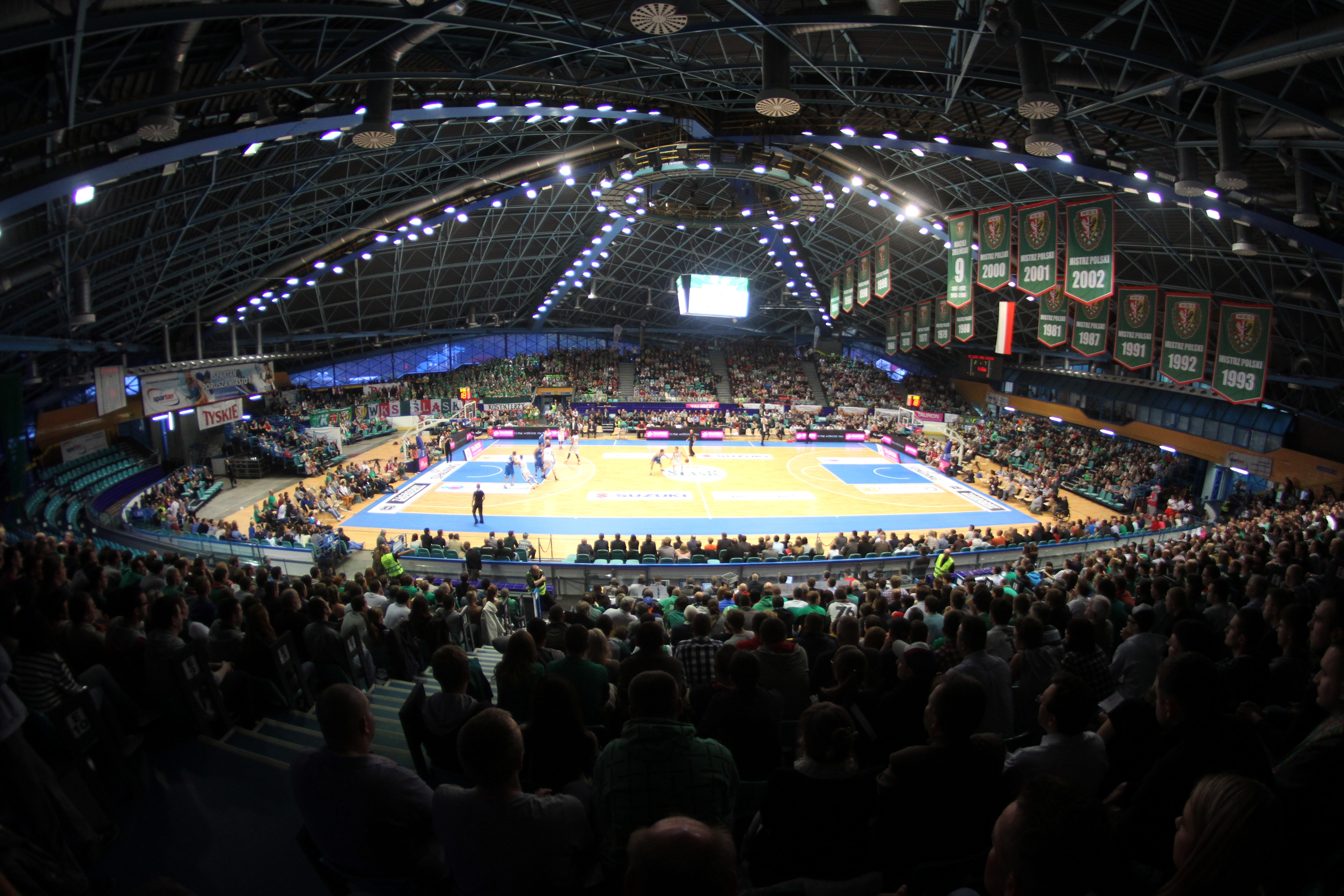
Orbita Hall hosted the muaythai events for the 2017 World Games.

For the World Games, there have been two venues that have been or be used to host muaythai. (Note: Muaythai is the official name of Muay Thai, recognized by International World Games Association and International Olympic Committee.)

Games	Venue	Other sports hosted at venue for those games	Capacity	Ref.
2017 Wrocław	Orbita Hall	Kickboxing	3,000	
2022 Birmingham	Boutwell Memorial Auditorium	Kickboxing, Sumo	5,000	
2025 Chengdu	Sichuan Gymnasium	Kickboxing	9,300	
