= Ukraine at the World Games =

- IOC code: UKR
- Medals Ranked 9th: Gold 74 Silver 73 Bronze 68 Total 215

World Games appearances (overview)
- 1993; 1997; 2001; 2005; 2009; 2013; 2017; 2022; 2025

Ukraine first participated at the World Games at the 1993 World Games and since then participated in all World Games.

Several Olympic medallists competed for Ukraine at the World Games. These athletes include Oxana Tsyhuleva (trampoline gymnastics), Anna Bessonova and Hanna Rizatdinova (both – rhythmic gymnastics), Stanislav Horuna (karate), while others were medallists of the World Games and participated at the Summer Olympics (Olena Movchan, Maryna Kyiko (both – trampoline gymnastics), Natalia Hodunko, Alina Maksymenko, Viktoriia Onopriienko (all – rhythmic gymnastics), Anita Serogina (karate)). Both Maryna Pryshchepa and Svitlana Iaromka won medals in sumo at the World Games and competed in judo at the Olympics. Olena Buryak competed in rowing at the Olympics and won medals in indoor rowing at the World Games.

At the 1989 World Games, when Ukraine was part of the Soviet Union, Ukrainian finswimmer Oleh Ananiev won a gold and a silver in individual competitions as well as two gold medals in relays.

== Medal count ==
=== Official sports ===
World Games	Athletes	Gold	Silver	Bronze		Rank
1981–1985	Did not participate					
1989	Part of Soviet Union					
(Netherlands) 1993 The Hague		1	5	1	7	26
(Finland) 1997 Lahti		5	7	0	12	11
(Japan) 2001 Akita	18	1	0	0	1	32
(Germany) 2005 Duisburg		7	6	8	21	7
(Chinese Taipei) 2009 Kaohsiung		9	12	10	31	6
(Colombia) 2013 Cali	87	9	10	9	28	7
(Poland) 2017 Wrocław	77	10	7	9	26	5
(United States) 2022 Birmingham	104	16	12	17	45	3
(China) 2025 Chengdu	60	16	14	14	44	3
Total		74	73	68	215	9

=== Invitational sports ===
World Games	Gold	Silver	Bronze		Rank
1981–1985	Did not participate				
1989	Part of Soviet Union				
(Netherlands) 1993 The Hague	0	0	0	0	—
(Finland) 1997 Lahti	0	0	0	0	—
(Japan) 2001 Akita	1	0	0	1	6
(Germany) 2005 Duisburg	0	0	0	0	—
(Chinese Taipei) 2009 Kaohsiung	0	0	0	0	—
(Colombia) 2013 Cali	0	1	1	2	15
(Poland) 2017 Wrocław	5	2	0	7	1
(United States) 2022 Birmingham	0	1	1	2	NR
(China) 2025 Chengdu	Future event				
Total	6	4	2	12	

=== Medals by sport ===
Sport	Gold	Silver	Bronze	Total
Powerlifting	12	12	10	34
Sumo	9	9	6	24
Trampoline gymnastics	8	3	2	13
Acrobatic gymnastics	7	9	8	24
Muaythai	6	1	0	7
Finswimming	3	6	12	21
Karate	3	2	0	5
Indoor rowing	3	1	0	4
Ju-jitsu	3	1	0	4
Rhythmic gymnastics	2	7	6	15
Kickboxing	2	3	3	8
Bodybuilding	2	1	1	4
Water skiing	1	1	0	2
Bowling	1	0	1	2
Beach handball	1	0	0	1
Parkour	1	0	0	1
Sport climbing	0	2	2	4
Wushu	0	1	2	3
Canoe marathon	0	1	0	1
Weightlifting	0	1	0	1
Orienteering	0	0	1	1
Totals (21 entries)	64	61	54	179

== Most successful Ukrainian competitors ==
52 Ukrainian athletes won at least two medals at World Games. Among athletes who won at least 4 medals are also Anna Bessonova (rhythmic gymnastics, 6 medals), Dmytro Sydorenko and Anastasiia Antoniak (both – finswimming, 4 medals). Only the athletes who represented independent Ukraine are included in the statistics.

No	Athlete	Sport	1st place, gold medalist(s)	2nd place, silver medalist(s)	3rd place, bronze medalist(s)	Total
1	Larysa Soloviova	Powerlifting	4	0	1	5
2	Olena Movchan	Trampoline gymnastics	3	1	0	4
3	Ihor Soroka	Finswimming	2	1	1	4
4	Olena Buryak	Indoor rowing	2	0	0	2
4	Bohdan Mochulskyi	Ju-jitsu	2	0	0	2
4	Igor Liubchenko	Muaythai	2	0	0	2
4	Oleh Pryimachov	Muaythai	2	0	0	2
4	Alina Boykova	Sumo	2	0	0	2
4	Olena Chabanenko	Trampoline gymnastics	2	0	0	2
4	Oxana Tsyhuleva	Trampoline gymnastics	2	0	0	2

== See also ==
- Ukraine at the Olympics
- Ukraine at the Paralympics
- Ukraine at the Youth Olympics
- Ukraine at the European Games
- Ukraine at the Universiade
- Ukraine at the European Youth Olympic Festival
