= Powerlifting at the 1997 World Games =

Powerlifting at the 1997 World Games consisted of six events, three events for women and three for men.

== Medal table ==
Rank	Nation	Gold	Silver	Bronze	Total
1	Chinese Taipei (TPE)	1	1	2	4
2	Indonesia (INA)	1	1	0	2
2	Norway (NOR)	1	1	0	2
4	Kazakhstan (KAZ)	1	0	1	2
5	Sweden (SWE)	1	0	0	1
5	United States (USA)	1	0	0	1
7	Finland (FIN)	0	1	1	2
8	Belgium (BEL)	0	1	0	1
8	Ukraine (UKR)	0	1	0	1
10	Argentina (ARG)	0	0	1	1
10	Poland (POL)	0	0	1	1
Totals (11 entries)		6	6	6	18

== Medalists ==
=== Men ===
Discipline	Gold	Silver	Bronze
Lightweight	(Kazakhstan) Alexey Sivokon	(Indonesia) Sutrisno Bin Darimin	(Chinese Taipei) Hu Chun-hsiung
Middleweight	(Indonesia) Petri Triharyanto	(Ukraine) Dmitriy Solovio	(Poland) Jan Wilczyński
Heavyweight	(Norway) Sturla Davidsen	(Norway) Carl Christoffersen	(Finland) Janne Toivanen

=== Women ===
Discipline	Gold	Silver	Bronze
Lightweight	(Chinese Taipei) Lin Li-min	(Finland) Raija Koskinen	(Kazakhstan) Nadezhda Mir
Middleweight	(United States) Carrie Boudreau	(Belgium) Ingeborg Marx	(Argentina) Irene Frangi
Heavyweight	(Sweden) Lisa Sjöstrand	(Chinese Taipei) Lee Chia-sui	(Chinese Taipei) Chao Chen-ye
