= Ingeborg Marx =

Belgian weightlifter

Personal information
- Full name: Ingeborg Marx
- Born: 24 April 1970 (age 56) Hasselt, Belgium
- Height: 155 cm (5 ft 1 in)
- Weight: 57.77 kg (127.4 lb)

Sport
- Country: Belgium
- Sport: Weightlifting and Powerlifting
- Weight class: 58 kg
- Team: National team
- Updated on 28 September 2016

Ingeborg Marx
Medal record

Representing Belgium

Women's Powerlifting

World Games
Bronze medal – third place	1993 The Hague	Middleweight
Silver medal – second place	1997 Lahti	Middleweight

Ingeborg Marx (born 24 April 1970 in Hasselt) is a Belgian female retired powerlifter and weightlifter, competing in the 58 kg category and representing Belgium at international competitions.

As powerlifter, she participated in 1993 and 1997 World Games, winning two medals and was IPF World champion in 1994. She was also a Category I referee.

She switched to Weightlifting and participated at the 2000 Summer Olympics in the 58 kg event. She competed at world championships, most recently at the 1999 World Weightlifting Championships.

== Major results ==
Year	Venue	Weight	Snatch (kg)				Clean & Jerk (kg)				Total	Rank
Year	Venue	Weight	1	2	3	Rank	1	2	3	Rank	Total	Rank
Summer Olympics
2000	Sydney, Australia	58 kg	72.5	77.5	~~82.5~~	—N/a	~~100.0~~	100.0	~~105.0~~	—N/a	177.5	11
World Championships
1999	Piraeus, Greece	58 kg	75	80	~~85~~	18	105	110	~~115~~	9	190	10
