= Ukraine at the 1993 World Games =

Ukraine at the World Games 1993
- IOC code: UKR
- NOC: National Olympic Committee of Ukraine

in The Hague, Netherlands 22 July – 2 August 1993
- Medals Ranked 26th: Gold 1 Silver 5 Bronze 1 Total 7

World Games appearances (overview)
- 1993; 1997; 2001; 2005; 2009; 2013; 2017; 2022

Ukraine competed at the 1993 World Games in The Hague, Netherlands, from 22 July to 2 August 1993.

== Medalists ==
=== Main programme ===
Medal	Name	Sport	Event
Gold	Marina Redkovolosova; Natalya Antipova	Acrobatic gymnastics	Women's pair tempo
Silver	Marina Redkovolosova; Natalya Antipova	Acrobatic gymnastics	Women's pair balance
Silver	Marina Redkovolosova; Natalya Antipova	Acrobatic gymnastics	Women's pair
Silver	Stanislav Kosakovski; Olessya Oliynyk	Acrobatic gymnastics	Mixed pair
Silver	Viktor Naleikin	Powerlifting	Men's heavyweight
Silver	Serhiy Bukhovtsev	Trampoline gymnastics	Men's individual
Bronze	Stanislav Kosakovski; Olessya Oliynyk	Acrobatic gymnastics	Mixed pair tempo

== External sources ==
- Results of the 1993 World Games
- Ukraine's results at the 1993 World Games
