= Teresa Tairi =

New Zealand netball player

Teresa Tairi is a former New Zealand international netball player. She has also coached netball for teams from the Cook Islands and in Australia.

== Early life ==
Teresa Tairi was born in the Cook Islands. She later moved to New Zealand, and attended Auckland Girls Grammar School.

== Netball playing career ==
Tairi first played for the Silver Ferns, the New Zealand national netball team in 1993. She won a silver medal at the 1993 World Games. She represented the country on 28 occasions. In 1994 she tore the anterior cruciate ligament in her right knee while playing for the national team, and three years later she tore the same ligament in her left knee. She represented New Zealand in the 1999 World Netball Championships, winning a silver medal. In 2000, she experienced further difficulties, tearing her right knee cartilage, but was able to get back into the national team in the same year. Tairi played for the Northern Force club from 1998 to 2005. For the 2008 ANZ Championship season, Force merged with Auckland Diamonds to create Northern Mystics and Tairi played with the Mystics in that year.

== Coaching ==
In 2009, Tairi coached the Cook Islands for the Netball World Youth Cup, held in Rarotonga in the Cook Islands. The team finished sixth, its best-ever performance. After moving to Australia in 2009, Tairi began to coach both men's and mixed netball teams playing for Netball New South Wales, a role she continued in until 2020. In Australia, she works as a Learning and Development Advisor for the Schindler Group.
