= Ju-jitsu at the 2001 World Games – Men's fighting −77 kg =

Ju-jitsu men's fighting −77 kg at the 2001 World Games
- Venue: Akita Prefectural Gymnasium, Akita, Japan
- Dates: 20 August 2001
- Competitors: 6 from 6 nations

Medalists
gold medal	(France) Didier Cezar
silver medal	(Netherlands) Michel van Rijt
bronze medal	(Sweden) Christer Öqvist

The men's fighting −77 kg competition in ju-jitsu at the 2001 World Games took place on 20 August 2001 at the Akita Prefectural Gymnasium in Akita, Japan.

== Competition format ==
A total of 6 athletes entered the competition. They fought in stepladder system.

== Results ==
=== Gold medal bracket ===
Quarterfinals
(Netherlands) Michel van Rijt (NED)	16
(Sweden) Christer Öqvist (SWE)	8
(France) Didier Cezar (FRA)	16
(Germany) Achim Berger (GER)	9

Semifinals
(Netherlands) Michel van Rijt (NED)	12
(Uruguay) Gregory Vallarino (URU)	4
(France) Didier Cezar (FRA)	14
(Japan) Tadayoshi Kakimoto (JPN)	0

Final
(Netherlands) Michel van Rijt (NED)	0
(France) Didier Cezar (FRA)	14

=== Bronze medal bracket ===
Consolation round
(Sweden) Christer Öqvist (SWE)	14
(Japan) Tadayoshi Kakimoto (JPN)	0
(Germany) Achim Berger (GER)	14
(Uruguay) Gregory Vallarino (URU)	9

Third place
(Sweden) Christer Öqvist (SWE)	21
(Germany) Achim Berger (GER)	15
