= Muaythai at the World Games =

- Governing body: IFMA
- Events: 6 (men: 3; women: 3)

Games
- 1981; 1985; 1989; 1993; 1997; 2001; 2005; 2009; 2013; 2017; 2022; 2025
- Medalists

Muaythai (Note: Muaythai is the official name of Muay Thai, recognized by International World Games Association and International Olympic Committee.) was featured in the World Games official programme for the first time at the 2017 World Games in Wrocław, Poland. It has been played at all editions since then. Muaythai was added to the World Games following the decision of the IWGA Annual General Meeting in May 2013.

The International Federation of Muaythai Associations is governing body for muaythai at the World Games.

== Summary ==
Games	Year	Events	Best Nation
10	2017	11	Ukraine
11	2022	12	United States
12	2025	6	China

== Events ==
The muaythai competition is organized as a set of tournaments, one for each weight class. The number of weight classes has changed over the years (currently 3 for men and 3 for women), and the definition of each class has changed several times, as shown in the following table. Weights were measured in kilograms.

From the 2022 World Games, muaythai events achieved full gender equality.

Men's weight classes
2017	2022	2025
Heavyweight (81–91 kg)		
Heavyweight (81–91 kg)		Cruiserweight (71–86 kg)
Light heavyweight (75–81 kg)	Light heavyweight (71–81 kg)	Cruiserweight (71–86 kg)
Middleweight (71–75 kg)	Light heavyweight (71–81 kg)	Cruiserweight (71–86 kg)
Light middleweight (67–71 kg)		Light middleweight (57–71 kg)
Welterweight (63.5–67 kg)		Light middleweight (57–71 kg)
Light welterweight (57–63.5 kg)		Light middleweight (57–71 kg)
Featherweight (54–57 kg)	Featherweight (–57 kg)	
Bantamweight (–54 kg)	Featherweight (–57 kg)	
8	6	3

Women's weight classes
2017	2022	2025
	Light welterweight (60–63.5 kg)	
Lightweight (54–60 kg)	Lightweight (57–60 kg)	Lightweight (54–60 kg)
Lightweight (54–60 kg)	Featherweight (54–57 kg)	Lightweight (54–60 kg)
Bantamweight (51–54 kg)		Bantamweight (48–54 kg)
Flyweight (–51 kg)	Flyweight (48–51 kg)	Bantamweight (48–54 kg)
Flyweight (–51 kg)	Light flyweight (–48 kg)	Light flyweight (–48 kg)
3	6	3

== Medal table ==
The numbers below are after the 2025 World Games in Chengdu, China.

Rank	Nation	Gold	Silver	Bronze	Total
1	Ukraine	7	2	1	10
2	Thailand	4	3	2	9
3	United States	3	3	4	10
4	China	2	0	1	3
5	Vietnam	2	0	0	2
6	Russia	1	3	2	6
7	Kazakhstan	1	1	1	3
7	Sweden	1	1	1	3
7	Turkey	1	1	1	3
10	Mexico	1	1	0	2
11	Australia	1	0	1	2
11	Belarus	1	0	1	2
11	Slovakia	1	0	1	2
14	Great Britain	1	0	0	1
14	Individual Neutral Athletes	1	0	0	1
14	Moldova	1	0	0	1
17	Poland	0	2	3	5
18	Israel	0	2	1	3
18	Morocco	0	2	1	3
20	Iran	0	2	0	2
21	France	0	1	1	2
22	Canada	0	1	0	1
22	Finland	0	1	0	1
22	Italy	0	1	0	1
22	Portugal	0	1	0	1
22	Spain	0	1	0	1
27	Hungary	0	0	3	3
28	United Arab Emirates	0	0	2	2
29	Czech Republic	0	0	1	1
29	Peru	0	0	1	1
Totals (30 entries)		29	29	29	87

== Number of Muay Thai practitioners by nation ==
The number in each box represents the number of Muay Thai practitioners the nation sent.

Nation	81	85	89	93	97	01	05	09	13	17	22	25	Years
Afghanistan											2	1	2
Armenia												1	1
Australia											2	1	2
Austria										1	2	1	3
Belarus										6			1
Belgium												1	1
Brazil											2		1
Bulgaria										1			1
Canada										1	2		2
China										1		6	2
Chinese Taipei										1			1
Croatia												1	1
Cyprus										1			1
Czech Republic										2	2		2
Estonia												1	1
Finland										1	1	1	3
France										3	3	1	3
Germany										1	1		2
Great Britain											2		1
Greece											1		1
Hong Kong											1		1
Hungary											2	1	2
Individual Neutral Athletes												2	1
Iran										1	3		2
Iraq										1	2		2
Israel										1	2	1	3
Italy										1	2	1	3
Jordan										1			1
Kazakhstan										4	2	1	3
Lebanon										1			1
Malaysia										2	2		2
Mauritius											2		1
Mexico										1	1	2	3
Moldova												1	1
Morocco										3	4	2	3
New Zealand										1			1
Peru										3	1		2
Philippines										1	2		2
Poland										11	3	2	3
Portugal										2	2		2
Russia										2			1
Saudi Arabia											2	1	2
Singapore											2	1	2
Slovakia											2	1	2
Slovenia										1			1
South Africa										1		1	2
South Korea										1	1		2
Spain										2	1		2
Sweden										3	3	1	3
Thailand										5	5	2	3
Turkey										3	4	3	3
Ukraine										6	5	3	3
United Arab Emirates											4	1	2
United States										2	12	3	3
Uzbekistan											3	1	2
Vietnam										2	2	1	3
Nations	–	–	–	–	–	–	–	–	–	37	39	31	
Athletes	–	–	–	–	–	–	–	–	–	87	96	48	
Year	81	85	89	93	97	01	05	09	13	17	22	25	
