= Leilani Read =

New Zealand and Samoa netball player

Personal information
- Full name: Leilani Elizabeth Taufailematagi Read
- Born: 31 August 1973 Titahi Bay, New Zealand
- Died: 17 August 1999 (aged 25) Wellington, New Zealand
- Occupation: Schoolteacher
- Height: 1.84 m (6 ft 0 in)

Netball career
- Playing positions: GA, GS
Years	National team	Caps
1993-96	New Zealand	9
1995	Samoa	7
Medal record
Representing New Zealand
World Games
Silver medal – second place	1993 The Hague	Team

Leilani Read (1973—1999) was a netball player who played nine times for the New Zealand national netball team and also for the Samoa national netball team. Read suffered from a rare blood disorder and died from a brain haemorrhage at the age of 25.

== Career ==
Leilani Elizabeth Taufailematagi Read, of Samoan descent, came from Titahi Bay. She was born on 31 August 1973 and attended Wellington Girls' College from 1987 to 1991. She played netball for Wellington as a Goal shooter (GS) or Goal attack (GA), and was chosen in 1993 to play for the Silver Ferns, New Zealand's national team, making her debut in a match against Namibia held at Palmerston North on 15 May. She was in the New Zealand team that won a silver medal at the 1993 World Games. Dropped in 1994, she decided to play for Samoa in the 1995 Netball World Championships, where Samoa finished ninth out of 27 teams, topping its qualifying group. She rejoined the Silver Ferns in 1996.

Known for her cheerful and "bubbly" personality, Read was a high school teacher. She was due to play again for Samoa in the 1999 World Netball Championships in Christchurch, New Zealand, but in August 1999 she suffered a brain haemorrhage that was caused by a rare blood disorder and died on 17 August. She was buried at the Whenua Tapu Cemetery at Pukerua Bay.
