= 1997 World Games =

Multi-sport event in Lahti, Finland

World Games V V Maailman Pelit V Världsspelen
- Host city: Lahti, Finland
- Nations: 73
- Athletes: 1,379
- Events: 164 (22 sports)
- Opening: 7 August 1997
- Closing: 17 August 1997
- Opened by: President Martti Ahtisaari
- Main venue: Lahti Sport Centre

The 1997 World Games (Finnish: 1997 Maailman Pelit, Swedish: 1997 Världsspelen), the fifth World Games, were an international multi-sport event held in Lahti, Finland on August 7–17, 1997. The opening and closing ceremonies took place at the Lahti Sport Centre.

== Sports ==
The 1997 World Games programme featured 23 official sports and 5 invitational sports. (Aikido was deemed a demonstration sport; no medal events were held.) The numbers in parentheses indicate the number of medal events that were contested in each sports discipline.

Official sports

- Acrobatic gymnastics (15)
- Aerobic gymnastics (4)
- Archery (6)
- Artistic roller skating (4)
- Bodybuilding (9)
- Boules sports (2) ^{P}
- Bowling (3)
- Casting (11)
- Dancesport (2)
- Finswimming (16)
- Fistball (1)
- Inline speed skating (10)
- Ju-jitsu (10)
- Karate (12)
- Korfball (1)
- Lifesaving (16)
- Parachuting (5)
- Powerlifting (6)
- Squash (2)
- Trampoline gymnastics (6)
- Tug of war (2) ^{M}
- Water skiing (12)
- Weightlifting (9) ^{W}

Invitational sports

- Aikido ^{N}
- Boules sports (2) ^{L}
- Floorball (1)
- Military pentathlon (2)
- Pesäpallo (1)
- Tug of war (2) ^{W}

== Calendar ==
●	Opening ceremony	●	Event competitions	●	Event finals	●	Closing ceremony

August	7th	8th	9th	10th	11th	12th	13th	14th	15th	16th	17th
Ceremonies	●										●
Bodybuilding		●	●								
Bowling		●	●	●							
Casting				●	●	●					
DanceSport				●	●						
Fistball			●	●	●						
Gymnastics					●	●	●		●	●	
Ju-jitsu									●	●	●
Korfball							●	●	●	●	●
Squash					●					●	●
Tug of war										●	●
August	7th	8th	9th	10th	11th	12th	13th	14th	15th	16th	17th

== Medal table ==
=== Official sports ===
The medal tally during the fifth World Games is as follows. United States finished at the top of the final medal table. Two bronze medals were awarded in each of the nine karate kumite events. No bronze medals were awarded in two bodybuilding and three weightlifting events. No silver medal was awarded in one weightlifting event.

* Host nation (Finland)

Rank	Nation	Gold	Silver	Bronze	Total
1	United States (USA)	17	18	10	45
2	China (CHN)	16	14	5	35
3	Germany (GER)	15	16	10	41
4	Russia (RUS)	15	10	13	38
5	Italy (ITA)	12	12	15	39
6	Sweden (SWE)	8	5	10	23
7	Great Britain (GBR)	6	8	9	23
8	Japan (JPN)	6	3	5	14
9	Belgium (BEL)	6	3	4	13
10	France (FRA)	5	12	7	24
11	Ukraine (UKR)	5	7	0	12
12	Australia (AUS)	5	4	5	14
13	Czech Republic (CZE)	5	4	4	13
14	Spain (ESP)	5	2	7	14
15	Netherlands (NED)	4	6	7	17
16	Chinese Taipei (TPE)	4	3	3	10
17	Belarus (BLR)	3	1	4	8
18	Canada (CAN)	3	1	2	6
19	Hungary (HUN)	2	2	3	7
20	Colombia (COL)	2	2	2	6
21	Egypt (EGY)	2	1	1	4
22	South Africa (RSA)	2	0	4	6
23	Austria (AUT)	1	3	1	5
24	Slovakia (SVK)	1	2	2	5
25	Denmark (DEN)	1	2	1	4
26	Norway (NOR)	1	1	4	6
27	Slovenia (SVN)	1	1	2	4
27	South Korea (KOR)	1	1	2	4
29	Greece (GRE)	1	1	1	3
29	Switzerland (SUI)	1	1	1	3
31	Bulgaria (BUL)	1	1	0	2
31	Indonesia (INA)	1	1	0	2
31	Uzbekistan (UZB)	1	1	0	2
34	Brazil (BRA)	1	0	2	3
35	Argentina (ARG)	1	0	1	2
35	Kazakhstan (KAZ)	1	0	1	2
37	Malaysia (MAS)	1	0	0	1
37	Saudi Arabia (KSA)	1	0	0	1
39	Finland (FIN)*	0	9	8	17
40	Poland (POL)	0	2	5	7
41	Ireland (IRL)	0	1	2	3
42	Liechtenstein (LIE)	0	1	0	1
42	Mexico (MEX)	0	1	0	1
44	Georgia (GEO)	0	0	1	1
44	Iran (IRI)	0	0	1	1
44	Lithuania (LTU)	0	0	1	1
44	New Zealand (NZL)	0	0	1	1
44	Philippines (PHI)	0	0	1	1
Totals (48 entries)		164	163	168	495

=== Invitation sports ===
* Host nation (Finland)

Rank	Nation	Gold	Silver	Bronze	Total
1	China (CHN)	2	1	0	3
2	Netherlands (NED)	2	0	0	2
2	Sweden (SWE)	2	0	0	2
4	France (FRA)	1	1	0	2
4	Italy (ITA)	1	1	0	2
6	Spain (ESP)	0	2	0	2
7	Brazil (BRA)	0	1	1	2
7	Finland (FIN)*	0	1	1	2
9	Australia (AUS)	0	1	0	1
10	Japan (JPN)	0	0	2	2
11	Croatia (CRO)	0	0	1	1
11	Russia (RUS)	0	0	1	1
11	Slovenia (SVN)	0	0	1	1
11	Switzerland (SUI)	0	0	1	1
Totals (14 entries)		8	8	8	24

== Sources ==
- World Games News - Number 11 - Dec.1996
- World Games News - Number 13 - May 1997
