= Akita Prefectural Gymnasium =

Stadium in Akita, Akita Prefecture, Japan

- 秋田県立体育館

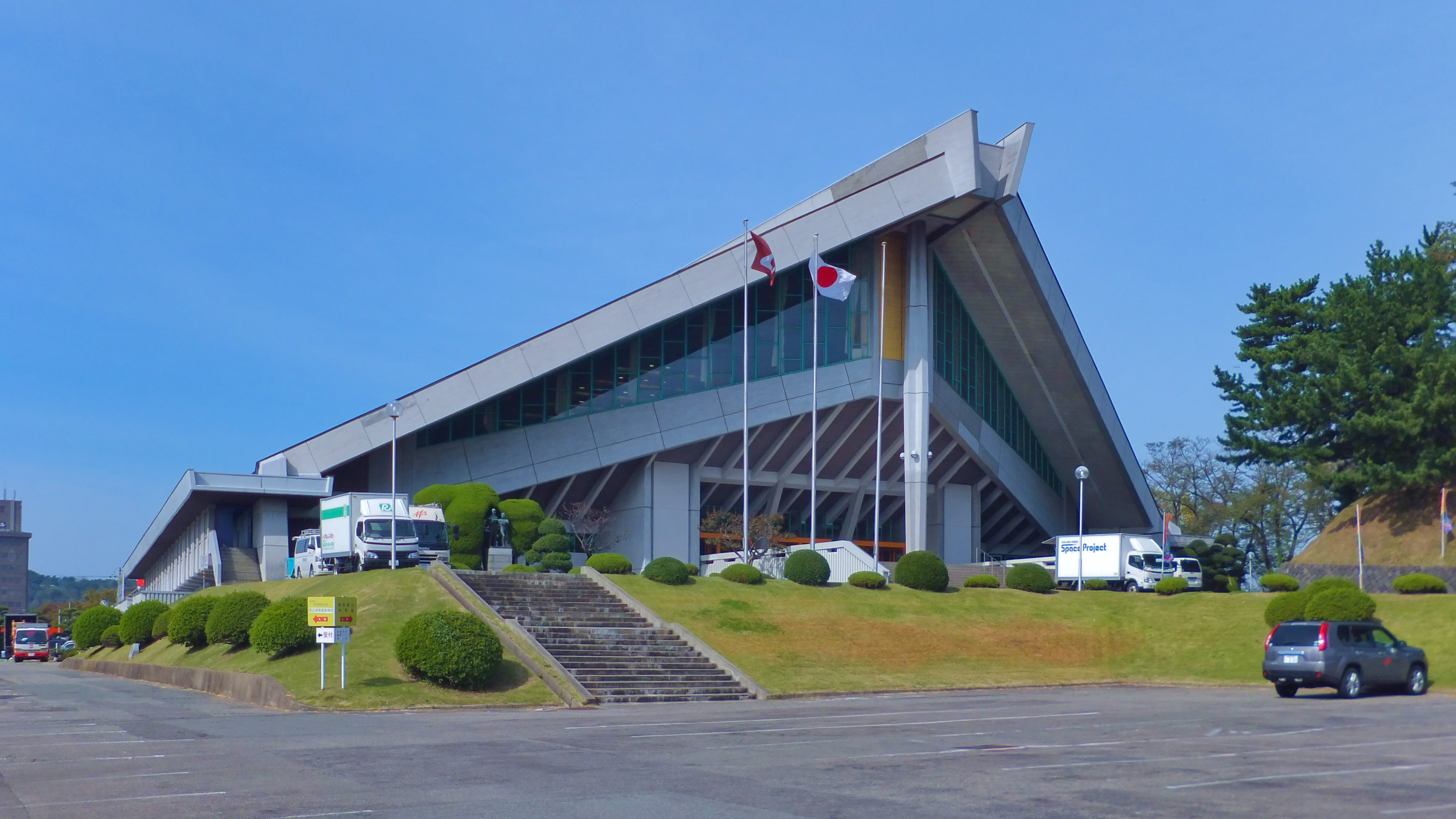
- Akita Prefectural Gymnasium

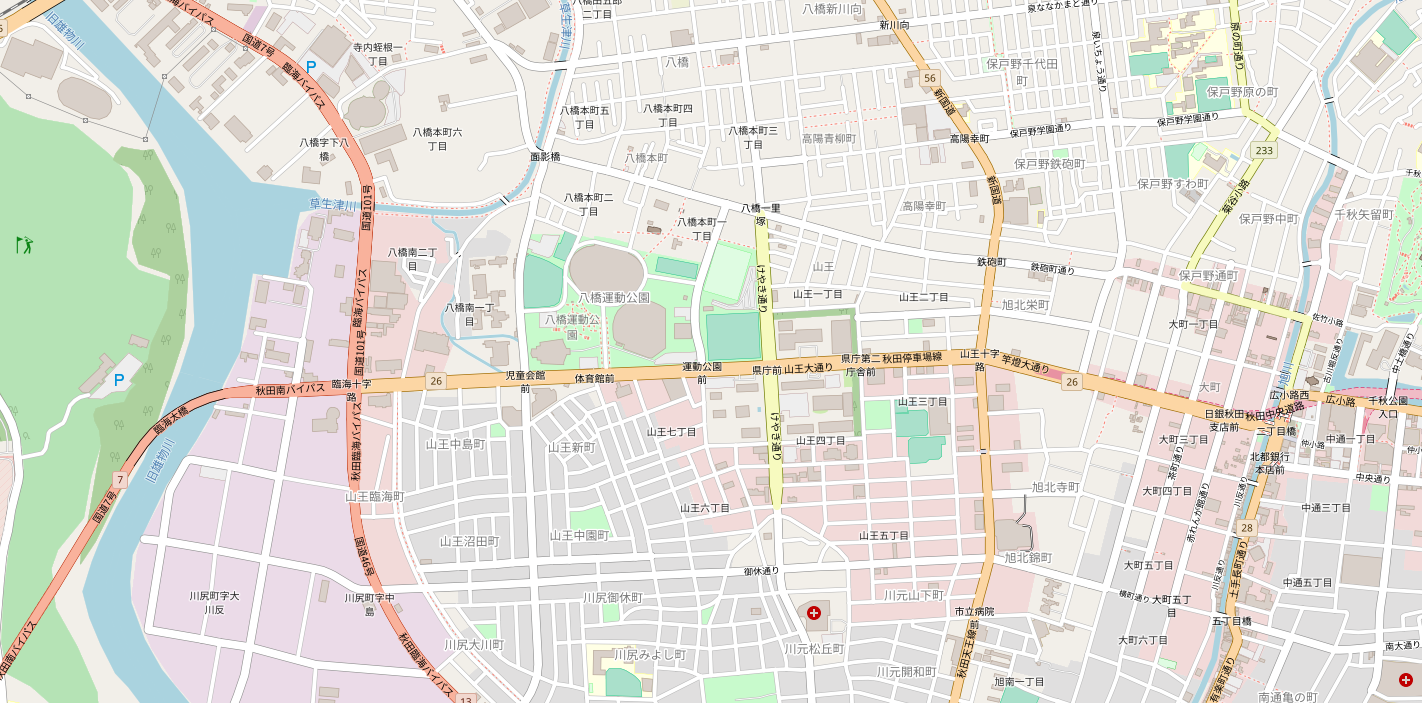
- Location within Akita, Akita Location within Akita Prefecture Location within Japan
- Interactive map of Akita Prefectural Gymnasium
- Location: Akita, Japan
- Coordinates: 39°43′10″N 140°5′37.9″E
- Capacity: 6,000
- Surface: Hardwood
- Parking: 142 spaces

Construction
- Built: 1968
- Opened: 1 October 1968
- Renovated: 2012 Flooring and seatings
- Architects: Yoshio Kobayashi and Masatoshi Soh

Tenants
- Akita Isuzu Motors (1968-1987); Akita Northern Happinets (2010-16); Women's Japan Basketball League Finals; Prestige International Aranmare Akita

Website
- www.akisouko.com/ken_tai/index.html

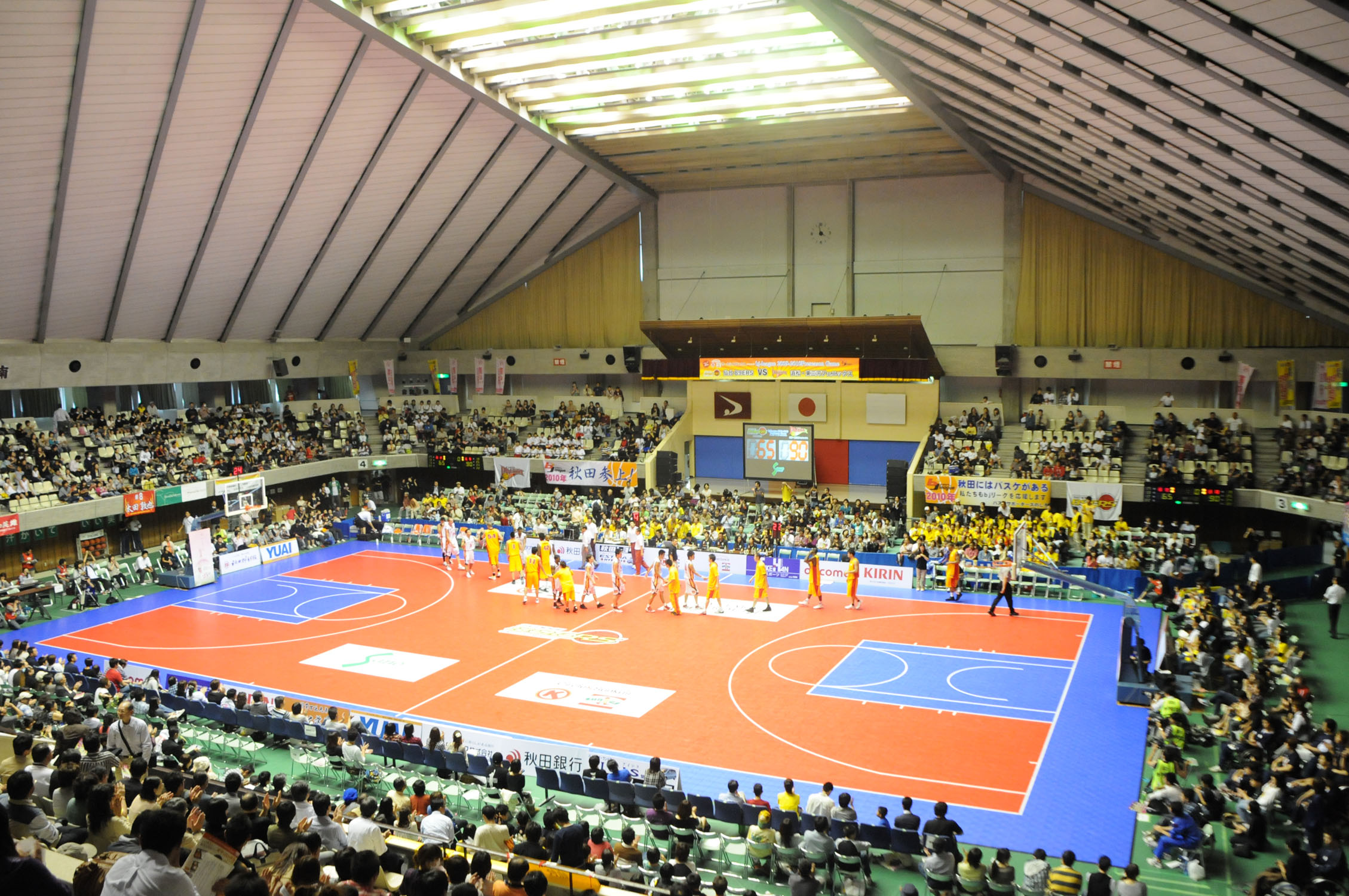
Main Arena

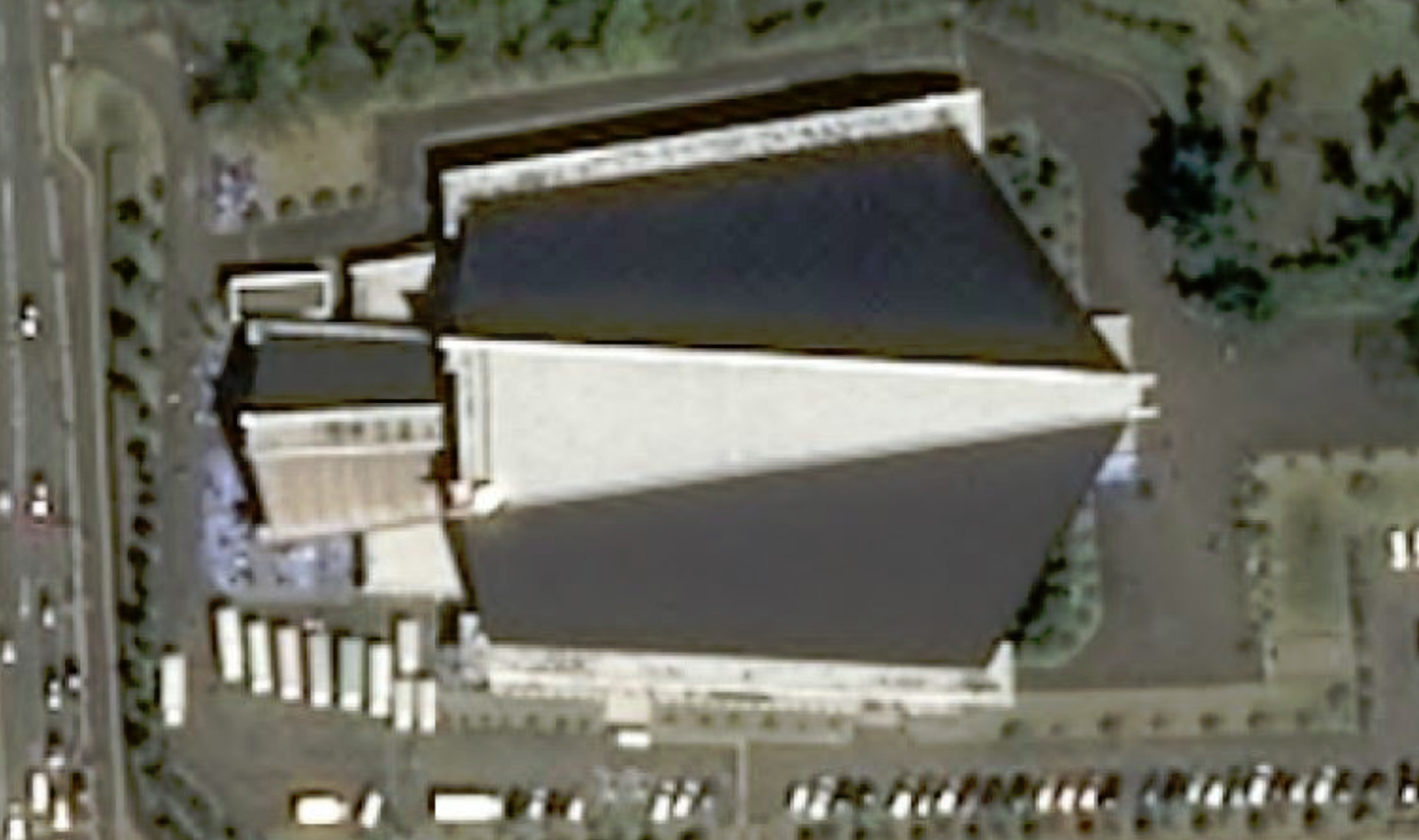
Satellite view

Akita Prefectural Gymnasium (秋田県立体育館, Akita Kenritsu Taiikukan) is a stadium in Akita, Akita Prefecture, Japan.

The gymnasium was built in 1968. Yoshio Kobayashi and Masatoshi Soh were the architects. Masao Sitoh and Arata Ono were the structural engineers. It is 3 kilometres (1.9 mi) west of the Akita Station.

The gymnasium has two separate facilities. The "large gymnasium" has a floor area of 1736 sq.meters, and a capacity of 6000 spectators. It can be divided into two basketball, two volleyball, two tennis, 10 badminton or 20 table tennis competitions. It can also be used for gymnastics, wrestler, boxing, fencing or other activities. The "small gymnasium" has a floor area of 463.1 sq.meters, and can be used for one volleyball, two badminton, two tennis, or other events.

Akita Prefectural Gymnasium hosted the 1979 World Boxing Association World Junior middleweight title match between Masashi Kudo of Japan against Ayub Kalule of Uganda on 24 October 1979.

There is no air conditioning in the gym.

== Entertainment events ==
- Chage and Aska 20-21 October 1993
- Kazumasa Oda 15 April 2012
- Dreams Come True 19-20 March 2016

== Sports events ==
- Kirin World Basketball - University of Kentucky vs Japan 7 July, 1982
- Ju-jitsu at the 2001 World Games - 19–20 August 2001
- Kirin Cup Basketball - Portugal vs Japan 24 July, 2003
- Wheel Gymnastics World Team Cup April 21, 2019

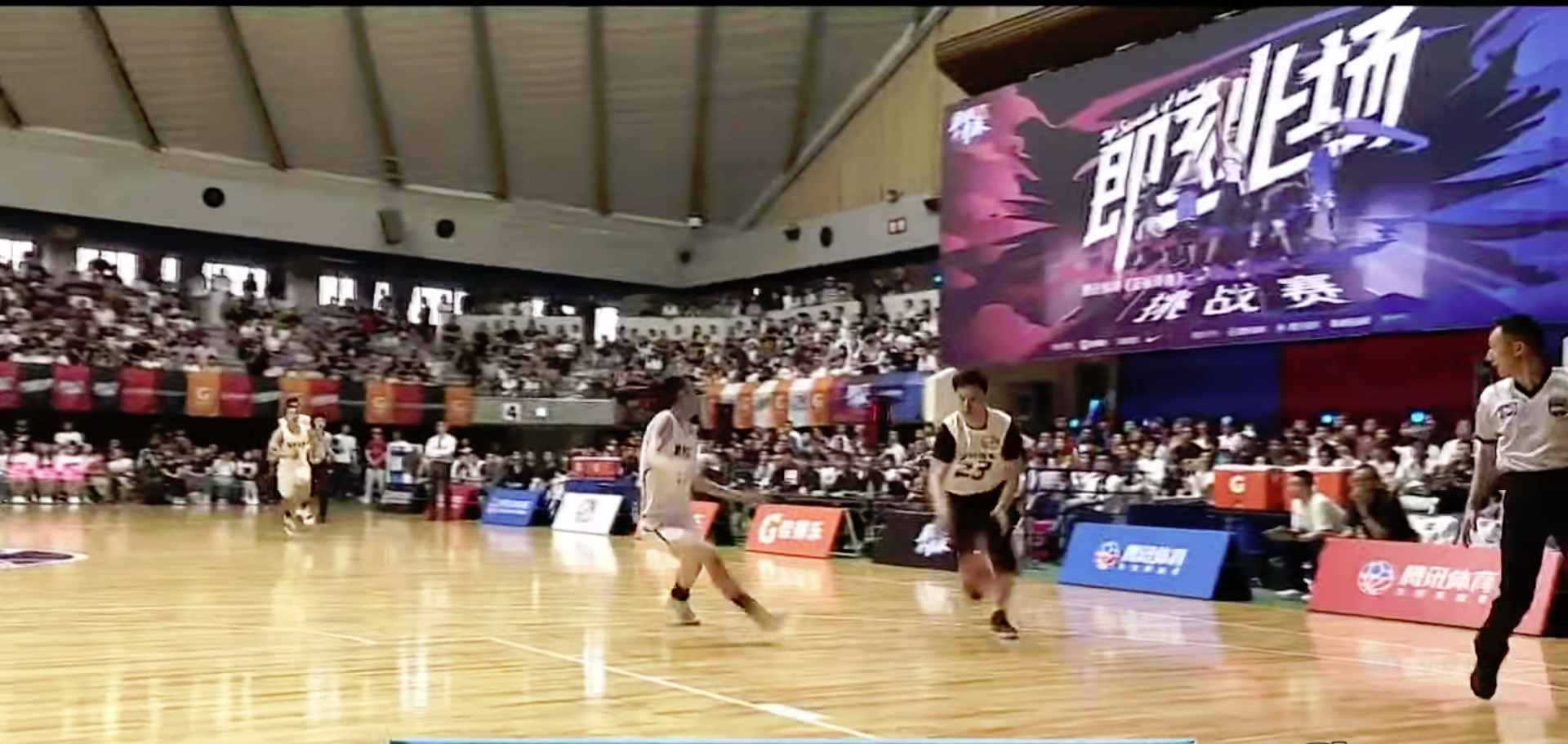
High school basketball game in 2019

== Access ==
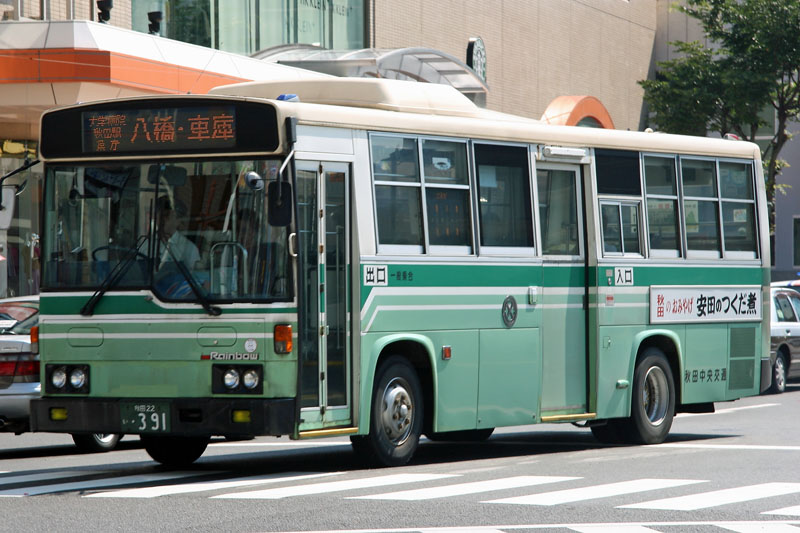
Chuo Kotsu bus

- From Akita Station: Akita Chūō Kōtsū for Rinkai Eigyosho, Tsuchizaki via Terauchi etc. Get off at Kenritsu Taiikukan-mae.
