= Powerslide (inline skating) =

The powerslide is a braking method used in inline skating where both skates are quickly moved into a position perpendicular to the moving direction of the skater. Whereas braking this way is quite common in ice skating (where it is called a hockey stop), any irregularity on the surface can make a novice roller skater easily lose balance and fall.

The powerslide offers an effective way of coming to a stop within a short distance to advanced skaters due to the friction the wheels incur on the surface. As powerful as it is, it does cause wear on the wheels, can cause the wheels to wear unevenly, and can only be performed with definitive success when the surface is familiar to the skater.

== Techniques ==
The forward powerslide or full frontal powerslide starts with the skater skating forward and spinning sideways to a stop. In a backward powerslide, the skater starts out skating backward. A roundhouse powerslide starts with the skater skating either forward or backward, spinning to face the opposite way, and in the same movement executing a powerslide.

In Motorsports, a powerslide is mechanically synonymous with a Handbrake turn, except that the vehicle continues to travel in a relatively straight line, and is often used to either stop quickly - as with a hockey stop, or perform sharp turns in spaces too tight for conventional drifting, up to and including an on-the-spot 180-degree turn if the vehicle's momentum is high enough.
