= Inline speed skating =

Sport discipline

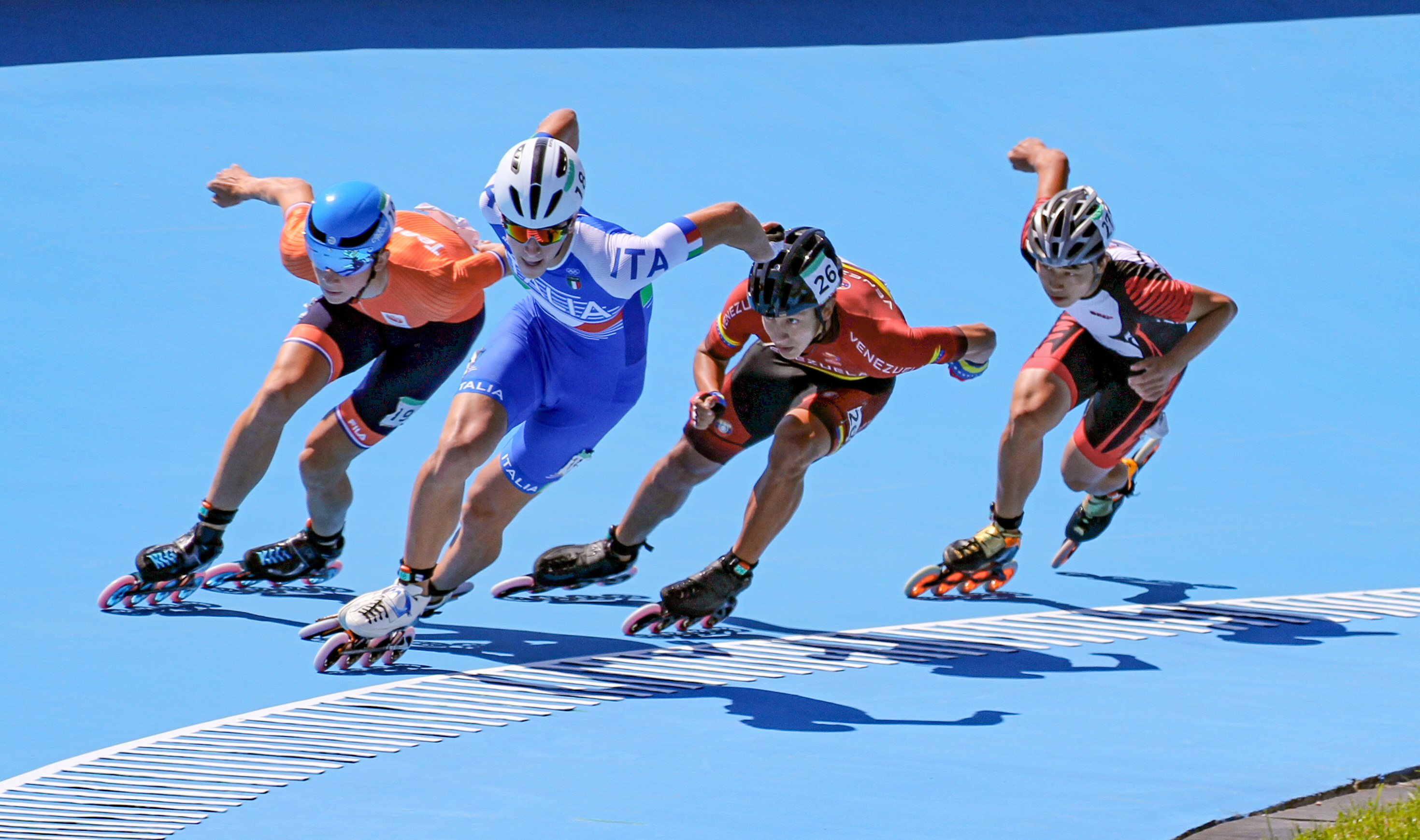
Roller skaters at the 2018 Summer Youth Olympics

Roller speed skating is the roller sport of racing on inline skates. The sport may also be called inline racing or speed skating by participants. Although it primarily evolved from racing on traditional roller skates, the sport is similar enough to ice speed skating that many competitors are known to switch between inline and ice speed skating according to the season.

== Skate ==
An inline speed skate is a specialized shoe version of the inline skate. The boot or shoe is close-fitting, without much padding and usually made of leather, carbon fiber, and/or fiberglass composites. For best performance, the boot must conform closely to the shape of the foot, so most inline speed skating boots are custom-fitted or else heat-moldable.

Speed skating boots are low-cut and offer little ankle support, allowing the skater extra ankle movement. Skin blisters due to friction can be a problem, and common solutions include neoprene or silicone "ankle bootee" such as "Ezeefit" or "Bunga Pads"; double thin synthetic socks; smaller boots; improving technique; re-moulding the boots; sports tape; and use of "advanced healing" plasters to help recovery.

The frame (sometimes called the chassis or plate) that holds the wheels may be made of aircraft-quality aluminum, magnesium, or possibly carbon fiber. Frames flex during skating, and the amount of flex can be a personal factor in which frame choice to use. Very "stiff" frames may be favored by heavy skaters. A frame that is too stiff for a particular skater may feel unstable on corners, while a frame that is not stiff enough will be slower. Frame stiffness also works along with boot and wheel stiffness, so there are many possible variations. Nevertheless, a light frame is desirable. Ideal frame length is affected by foot size and wheel size. A slightly shorter frame may be preferred for the tight curves of smaller tracks; a longer frame may be preferred for longer distance events.

The frame position can usually be adjusted with respect to the skate to adjust for a skater's individual foot, ankle and leg characteristics. Frame positioning is very critical as even a minor change from the skater's actual frame position can lead to severe foot pain. Also, many times it leads to 'locking' of the skater's ankle and/or calf muscle, thereby restricting its movements. It may take a skater several days to weeks to test and adjust the frame position of his new skates. The common inline mounting is 195mm, which is different from the ice mounting of 165mm. The frame usually mounts three, four, or five polyurethane wheels. The three wheel frames are used by skaters with small feet, otherwise four-wheel frames are commonly used, with 90 mm to 110 mm diameter wheels. Five-wheel frames with smaller wheel have lost favor. Each wheel contains two ball bearings with an aluminum spacer, held in place with an axle screwed into the frame.

Larger wheels require better skating technique, so skaters generally progress upwards in wheel size as they gain experience. "Hi-Lo" arrangements are also available, which usually have three larger wheels and one smaller wheel under the ball of the foot, allowing a lower and shorter overall frame design.

In 2014 Powerslide (a German inline skate company) introduced a 125mm wheel for use on a three-wheeled frame varying in sizes from 11.8" to 13.0". Much controversy surrounded this development since FIRS did not allow 125mm wheels at the 2014 and 2015 world championships. On January 18 of 2016 FIRS released a press release that stated: "Dear Friends, Considering the evolution and growth that our sport has attained in the last years, the FIRS and the Speed Technical Committee have decided to allow, starting from February 1, 2016, the use of the wheels up to a maximum size of 125mm but only for the Marathons (JUNIOR and SENIOR) and the MASTER Category (MEN and LADIES). We will be grateful for the spread of this information and we take this opportunity to send you. Kind regards, Jorge Roldan, FIRS Speed Technical Committee, Chairman & Robert Marotta FIRS Secretary General."

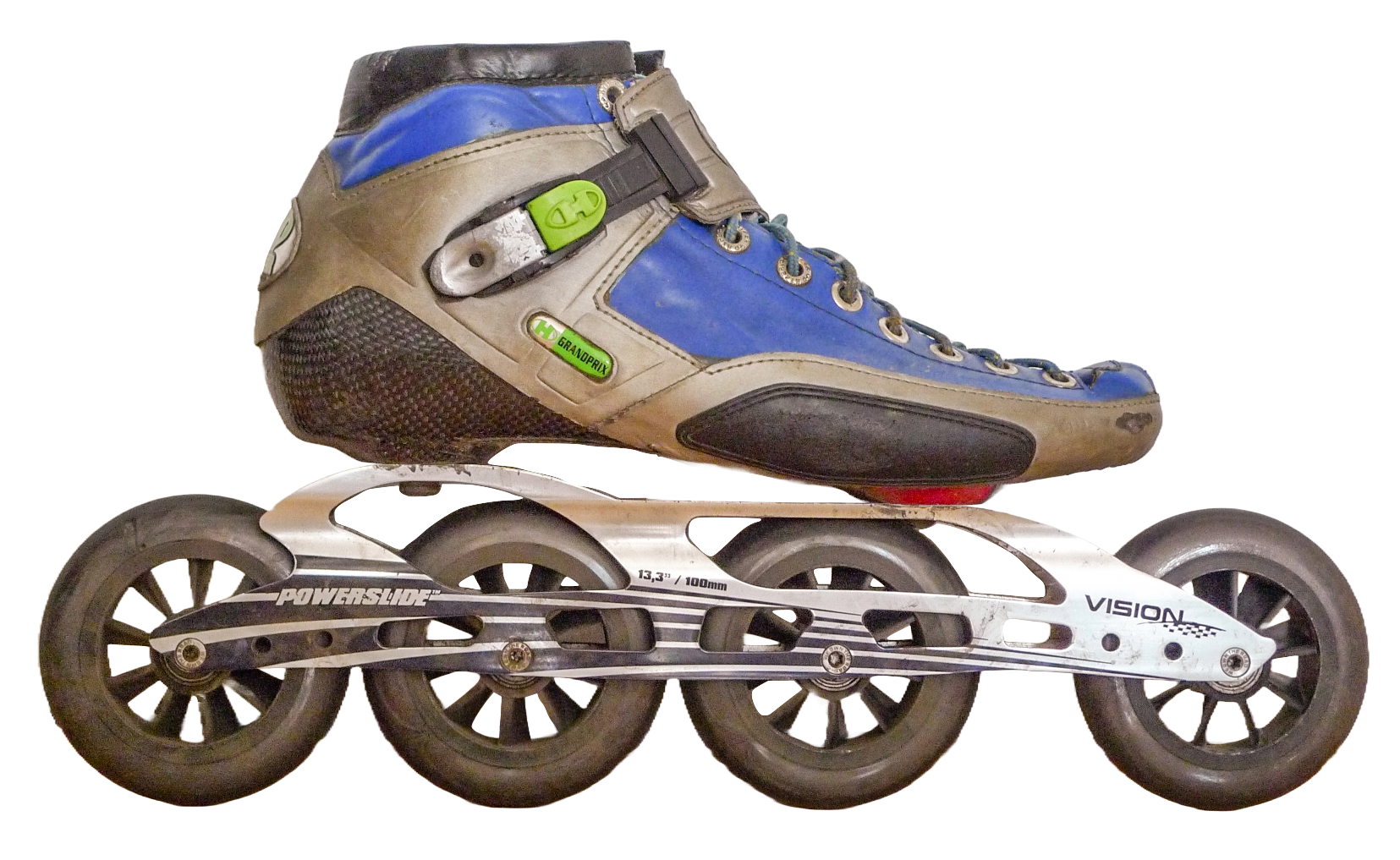
Inline Speed Skate (quad wheel configuration) Road race Berlin 2017

Harder wheels minimize elastic hysteresis energy absorption, due to skater's weight deforming the solid polyurethane "tyre". So, speed skaters tend to select the hardest possible wheels, with the highest polyurethane durometer for their skating condition, limited by either wheel slip or surface roughness. Durometer selection is also affected by skater weight, and temperature. Wheels for indoor use are hardest with a durometer of 88–97. They tend to last well, but can be easily damaged if used outdoors. Wheels for outdoor use are softer with a durometer of 82–87, and tend to wear more quickly. Harder outdoor wheels can also be used effectively indoors. Skaters sometimes combine different hardness wheels on the same skate in an attempt to achieve the best combination.

Skaters also consider wheel "rebound". This refers to the relative height to which a dropped wheel rebounds. It is a reasonable comparative indicator of the relative energy absorbed by elastic hysteresis of a wheel during skating.

Bearing sizes have been standardized around the popular 608 series. A smaller and lighter 688 series has had limited acceptance. Bearing manufacturing precision generally run from ABEC-1 to ABEC-11, and some skate bearings are additionally designed to be "loose" to minimize ball rolling friction.

Various grades of steel offer better hardness, rust resistance etc. Bearings with ceramic balls (and races) have been available since the late 1990s. They are lighter and longer lasting, however significantly more expensive. Black silicon nitride ceramic is superior to white zirconium dioxide ceramic, since it is considerably harder and tougher. At the modest rotational speeds encountered in skates, manufacturer data suggests negligible difference in friction performance between the various bearing materials. At these speeds, ball bearing friction tends to be dominated by seals and lubricants.

Bearing shields reduce the entry of dirt into the bearing. Metal and rubber non-contact shields are commonly used, of which rubber shields are slightly more effective. Neither shield type is totally effective, often resulting in the need for bearing maintenance. The ball retainer is usually made of either metal, plastic, or glass. Plastic types are preferred since they are quieter.

Bearing lubrication is usually either light oil or grease. Synthetic types last longer before breaking down. Grease assists in holding dirt away, and stays in the bearing longer, reducing maintenance and increasing bearing life. The lifetime of bearings used for outdoor speed skating is often quite limited due to damage caused by dirt ingress. These bearings are usually cleaned by soaking them in petrol overnight and then cleaning the dirt.

In search of the maximum speed the principal goal is to minimize wind resistance, hence the use of skinsuits, special helmets and techniques. The second issue is elastic hysteresis energy absorption in the wheel. The distant third is bearing internal friction, a set of bearings in good condition, properly inserted and lubricated is normally enough.

== Technique and control ==
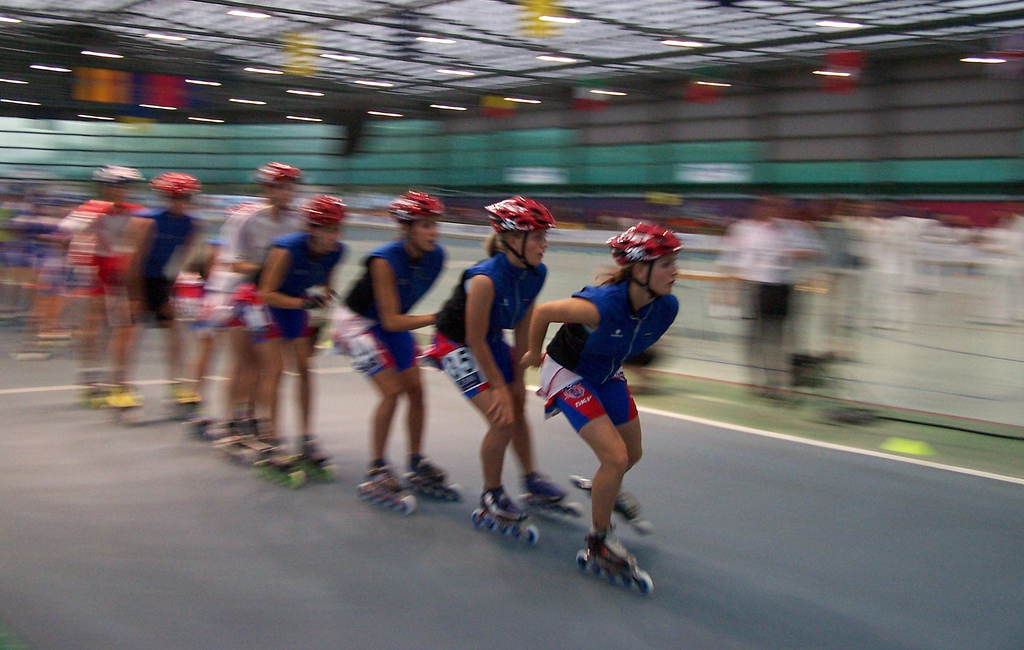
Competitors warming up before a race.

Mechanically, strokes in speed skating are deeper and faster (to a sharper angle, closer to the point of losing traction) than recreational skating but not as deep or as fast as in ice speed skating. This is because of the greater frictional forces in the direction of travel and lesser ability to apply friction without slipping of wheels on a hard surface compared to a blade on ice.

Speedskaters move each foot across the center line of travel, leading to the double push, a method named by United States skater Chad Hedrick. The technique allows two pushes in each stroke of the skate. However, it can be tiring for inexperienced skaters who have improper technique, and they will often save it until needed, such as the latter stages or final sprint of a distance race. With proper execution, the double push is an energy saver. The double push is mostly used in outdoor racing and the straightaways of indoor skating.

During sprints, skaters need to initially push their body with force to get a jump start. For this they tend to take quick and sharp strides. Once they have achieved a good pace, they move to taking comparatively longer strides. Speedskaters usually bend from their knees to maintain a low posture. This has two advantages. First of all, it increases the reach of the skater's legs, which results into even more powerful strides. Secondly, a low posture reduces the total surface area of the skater's body that comes in contact with the resistive air, thus providing an aerodynamic advantage.

Turning is significantly more difficult with inline speed skates than recreational skates because of more and larger wheels, creating a longer wheelbase. The wheel profile, that is, the cross-section, is parabolic, with a sharper shape than recreational or aggressive wheels, allowing the skater to essentially skate on a smaller, and hence more agile, wheel when leaned over in a turn.

Brakes are not used on speed skates, so various other techniques to slow down are used, such as slaloming (skating s-curves) or v-plowing (or "snow-plowing"), where the heels are pushed outward and the toes inward. The v-plow is often the stop used in situations where there is little lateral and forward room to stop. One technique is the T-stop, essentially dragging one foot perpendicular to and behind the other, however this wears the wheels of that skate quickly. Another stop involves picking up one foot and setting it down quickly and repeatedly somewhat perpendicular to the forward motion while keeping weight on the other foot. Hockey stops are possible on speed skates, but require a very deep lean in order to cause the wheels to lose traction and slide, also the fact that wheels are sliding means that the wheels are also wearing down very quickly. Grass runouts are always a last option, given an adjacent grassy area.

When switching over to ice, speed skaters are generally faster. While there are some small differences in technique, speed skaters already have the muscle they need to skate on ice.

An inline speedskater takes much time to stop and often has few options in an emergency. It typically takes several hundred feet on a level surface to come to a stop at a full, controlled deceleration. Thus, a skater should be familiar with and proficient in stopping techniques before attempting difficult situations such as heavily travelled roads or hills.

== Training ==
Inline speed skating requires professional athletes to go through intense physical training. A strict diet and a rigorous training schedule has to be followed. The training schedule is mainly designed to build and maintain strong thighs and calves. But skating, just like swimming, requires the use of the whole body. Therefore, it is critical that the whole schedule is well balanced to attain and maintain a sturdy upper-body too. Also, a flexible upper body is preferred, which could help in maintaining the balance of the body in a better way. A heavy, protein-rich diet is required to be followed.

Usually, skaters have two sets of skates/wheels, one for training and the other for races and competitions. Wheels and bearings used for practice generally require much more efforts to gain some momentum and speed, as compared to the ones used in competitions. Ultra distance training requires years of training, time, and dedication to reach world class levels.

== Tactics ==
In outdoor inline racing events, team tactics may apply. If so, tactics are similar to those of marathon ice speed skating and of road bicycle racing, in which members of the team perform specified roles.

Skaters tend to form packs or "pacelines", or "pelotons", in which skaters line up behind a lead skater and match their stride, thereby saving energy by skating in their draft. Sportsmanship requires that skaters in the paceline share the duty as paceline leader. Those who never "take a pull" at the front are likely to find other skaters tactically working together to defeat them.

During the course of a race, skaters may make "attacks", speeding up the pace in an effort to weed out the weaker and slower competition. These attacks may include "breakaways" and "fliers", in which skaters try to create new smaller and faster packs or else to escape entirely from the other skaters. Depending on the length of the race and the skills and the cooperative effort of the chasers, these breakaways may or may not prove successful. If a skater escapes a pack in order to join a successful breakaway group, it is known as "bridging up".

When skaters who are member of teams participate in a race together, they often have pre-determined roles. One or two would be designated attackers whose role it is to tire out the competition. Another skater may be the designated winner for the team, and he may avoid chasing any breakaways until late in a race, possibly until the final sprint if the lead pack has never broken up.

== Quad speed skating ==
Quad roller-skating racing is the precursor to the popularity and acclaim received by competitive racing on in-line skates. Up until 1991, all World Championships were held on quad skates. Most events at the 1992 World Championships were specific to quads, however, some events were classed as "open" giving the athlete the option of choosing either quads or in-lines. The same criteria were applied for the 1993 World Championships. In 1994 all events were declared as "open". Despite this, it had soon become evident that in-lines were predominantly quicker than quads on all surfaces and all tracks and to this end athletes opted for in-lines over quads, as is still the case today.

== Race venues and formats ==
Inline speed skating races are held in a variety of formats and on a variety of surfaces.

Indoor races are most common in the United States, which has a long tradition of racing on skates at rinks. The competitions are generally held at roller skating rinks with plastic-coated wood floors and, less commonly, a plastic coated cement floor. The track is about 100 m in circumference. At USA Roller Sports (USARS) events, tracks are marked by four pylons set in a parabolic oval, while at NIRA (National Inline Racing Association) events, tracks are marked by multiple pylons that create an oval shaped track. Events, or meets, are typically structured so that members of numerous age groups race in three or four distances. For the more populous divisions, there may be a series of heats in order to qualify for the final race. To some extent, indoor inline races are similar to short track speed skating.

Outdoor races may be held on regular pavement on city streets or park roads, or they may be held at specialized venues similar to velodromes, sometimes called patinodromes. A patinodrome is generally about 200 m in circumference and may be surfaced with asphalt, concrete or similar material. The curves may be banked. Such specialized skating tracks are relatively common in Europe but rare in the United States. The international governing body for World Roller Sports, World Skate, and its technical committee, Committee International de Course (CIC), are making strides to commonise tracks used specifically for World Championships that have the same size, shape and surface. Plans for such tracks are available from FIRS upon request.

Race formats include:

Time trials
Held "against the clock", each skater races individually or in pairs over a distance of 100 m to 300 m, attempting to establish the best time. Time trials are occasionally held over longer distances, up to 100k which is 62 miles for fastest time. Another format measures how many miles one can achieve alone in 24 hours or 48 hours. All time trials are very physically demanding and not as popular as group racing. The time trial is the hardest of races, called "The Truth" because it's the true test of the individual with no help from drafting, teammates, or other competitors to achieve the fastest times. Bicycling has time trials in the Olympics and the Tour de France, for example. Sometimes time trial races can use individual pursuit format.

Sprint races
Four to eight competitors races on short distance (100m to 1000m) in a knock-out tournament.

Elimination races
In these moderate-distance races, also known as last man out, the hindmost skater is eliminated from the competition each time the pack of skaters complete a lap or when they complete certain specified lap numbers. At one or two laps to before the finish, the group has usually been pared down to four or five skaters. At this point, the first across the finish line is the winner.

Points races
In these moderate-distance races, the first, second and third skaters to cross the start/finish line at certain specified laps are awarded points. Laps late in the race are worth more points, with the final lap worth the most points of all. It is possible to win a points race without actually being the first to cross the finish line at the end.

Points-elimination races
A combination of elimination races and points races.

Relays
Relay events include teams of two to four skaters each. Indoor meets may include "mixed" relay events in which teams have either one female and one male OR two females and two males, but outdoor relays (usually held on tracks) are usually if not always single-sex events. In a mix relay, it is traditional that a female goes to the starting line as the first skater to race.

Criterium races
Instead of racing a specified distance or number laps, the skaters skate for a certain amount of time, then plus a (small) number of laps. The time is typically between 15 and 45 minutes, after which a bell is rung and the skaters informed the race is over when they skate one or two more laps around the course. The portion of the race skated after the bell is rung is known as the bell lap (or laps).

Distance races
Although events such as points-elimination races and criteriums may cover a distance of 10 to 25 km, a distance race usually refers to a race over a set distance of about 5 km or longer and without specialized points or elimination rules. The event may be truly point-to-point or may be held on a repeating course with a circumference of at least 1 km. Distance races are often marketed to the general populace and not just to members of inline racing clubs.

Marathons
Lately there is a new movement of skaters bringing big masses to events, these events are the skate marathons, 42.195 kilometres (26.219 mi). The most popular marathons in the USA are: The North Shore Marathon and Saint Paul Inline Marathon, however they are now taking place all over the world including the Goodwood Roller Marathon in the UK. These races gain more popularity everyday as skaters form friendships and bonds at these events.

Ultra Marathons
Ultra Marathons draw relatively large numbers. Given the time needed to complete such events, one could say that they are the equivalent to a running marathon. These events were very popular in the late 1990s but declined after the year 2001; there is a new movement of people keeping this events alive and bringing them back to the forefront of the speed skating world.

There are two very old and popular ultra marathons in the USA:
1. The New York City Skate Marathon and New York 100K The New York City Skate Marathon & NY 100K has been held since the early 1990s, with Brooklyn's Prospect Park hosting the event since the late 1990s. Various distances are competed at the event, but the event always includes a race of approximately 42 kilometers and another of 100 kilometers.
2. Athens to Atlanta Road Skate (The A2A) This is the longest running point to point event in the USA, with a maximum distance of 86.7 miles (139.5 km) covering the distance from Athens, Georgia to Atlanta, Georgia.

In the early days of inline racing, sponsors of distance races were often also running event organizers, and the races they organized were commonly the same distances as those of running races, about 5–10 km. By the mid-1990s such events were proving to not be very popular and in the United States, where sales of inline skates were also beginning to slip, there was a decline in participation at races. However, at about that time in Europe, where inline skate sales were beginning to rise, race sponsors began to regularly organize longer events, particularly inline marathons. Such events proved to be enormously popular among fitness skaters, with some events such as the Berlin Inline Marathon (with more than 11.000 at its peak) and the Engadin Inline Marathon in St. Moritz, Switzerland, regularly attracting over 5000 skaters each year.

In about 2000 American event sponsors followed suit, and inline half-marathons and marathons were scheduled more and more frequently around the country. As in Europe the events proved a big draw with fitness skaters looking for events which would give their training a focus. However, by 2005 this surge was tempered as some major events were either postponed for a year or cancelled permanently. In the United States the most popular inline marathon has continued to be the NorthShore Inline Marathon in Duluth, Minnesota.

In 1999, a team of six British men led by Paul Robinson skated from Land's End to John O'Groats, a distance of 886 miles (1,426 km). This is the only known long-distance skating event held in the world to date.

Dryland triathlons
Occasionally organized by triathlon sponsors, these events substitute inline skating for the swimming component of the race. These events were infrequent even during the mid-1990s boom in inline skating participation. Today they are rare to non-existent.

Downhill races
An event most popular in the Alpine countries of Europe, these races are timed events down a steep course. It can be held in roads or in concrete bobsleigh courses in summertime. Racers usually skate alone and the event commonly uses the best time of two heats to establish the winner. Downhill inline racers usually wear skates much more like "regular" inline skates than inline speed skates, along with extensive body covering and protective gear, and strong helmets. They may reach speeds of up to 130 km/h. The International Inline Downhill Association (IIDA) is the largest organization for inline downhill racing, holding races on several continents.

== World Championships ==
The Inline Speed Skating World Championships (World Roller Speed Skating Championships) are inline speed skating competitions sanctioned by World Skate. The World Championships have been held unofficially since 1937 and officially since 1966.

== Olympic status ==
Attempts by the world governing body for roller sports, the International Roller Sports Federation (FIRS), to gain Olympic status for any of its disciplines were distinctly insufficient in the closing decades of the 20th century. Most notably, it failed to capitalize when rink hockey (a form of roller hockey) appeared as a demonstration sport at the 1992 Summer Olympics in Barcelona.

Efforts by FIRS to obtain Olympic status became more coherent in about 2000, with inline speed skating promoted as the roller sport best suited for the Olympics. However, the federation faces competition from approximately 20 other sports also seeking entry into the Olympics, while at the same time the president of the International Olympic Committee has expressed a desire to reduce the size of the summer Olympic Games. Roller sports was a candidate sport for the 2016 Summer Olympics, following the drop of baseball and softball, but the Olympic Committee eventually chose rugby sevens and golf instead.

Notably, roller speed or in-line speed skating has been an included sport at the World Games since their inception in 1981.

== World records ==
=== Track ===
Male
| Distance (m) | Skater | | Time/Mark | Date | Place | Ref |
|---|---|---|---|---|---|---|
| 200 Dobbin Sprint | Jacob Melton | United States | 13.654 | 16 April 2026 | Geisingen (Germany) |
| 200 TT | Santiago Vasquez | Colombia | 17.103 | 10 October 2026 | Asuncion (Paraguay) |
| 500 | Edwin Estrada | Colombia | 39.931 | 17 November 2015 | Kaohsiung (Taiwan) |
| 1000 | Pedro Causil | Colombia | 1:18.887 | 8 November 2021 | Ibague (Colombia) |
| 5000 | Hugo Morin | France | 7:04.004 | 10 October 2026 | Asuncion (Paraguay) |
| 10000 | Jason Suttels | Belgium | 14:18.389 | 6 November 2021 | Ibagué (Colombia) |

Female
| Distance (m) | Skater | | Time/Mark | Date | Place |
|---|---|---|---|---|---|
| 200 Dobbin Sprint | Fran Vanhoutte | Belgium | 14.620 | 18 April 2026 | Geisingen (Germany) |
| 200 TT | Ivonne Nochez Gallardo | El Salvador | 18.389 | 10 October 2026 | Asuncion (Paraguay) |
| 500 | Kollin Castro | Colombia | 42.951 | 12 October 2026 | Asuncion (Paraguay) |
| 1000 | Kollin Castro | Colombia | 1:24.751 | 13 October 2026 | Asuncion (Paraguay) |
| 5000 | Marisa Canafoglia | Italy | 7:29.379 | 10 October 2026 | Asuncion (Paraguay) |
| 10000 | Gabriela Rueda | Colombia | 15:14.424 | 11 October 2026 | Asuncion (Paraguay) |

=== Road ===
Male
| Distance (m) | Skater | | Time | Date | Place | Ref |
|---|---|---|---|---|---|---|
| 100 | Jhoan Guzman | Spain | 9.663 | 21 September 2024 | Montesilvano (Italy) |
| 200 | Joseba Fernandez | Spain | 15.879 | 12 September 2012 | San Benedetto del Tronto (Italy) |
| 300 | Andres Felipe Muñoz | Colombia | 23.628 | 21 March 2010 | Gijon (Spain) |
| 500 | Andres Felipe Muñoz | Colombia | 37.843 | 4 August 2013 | Cali (Colombia) |
| 1000 | Ippolito Sanfratello | Italy | 1:17.757 | 17 June 1999 | Padua (Italy) |
| 1500 | Chad Hedrick | United States | 1:57.698 | 17 June 1999 | Padua (Italy) |
| 2000 | Derek Downing | United States | 2:40.658 | 17 June 1999 | Padua (Italy) |
| 3000 | Fabio Marangoni | Italy | 4:18.379 | 17 June 1999 | Padua (Italy) |
| 5000 | Arnaud Gicquel | France | 6:43.900 | 30 July 2003 | Padua (Italy) |
| 10000 | Joey Mantia | United States | 13:46.801 | 6 September 2006 | Anyang (Korea) |
| 15000 | Chad Hedrick | United States | 22:11.960 | 2 August 2000 | Barrancabermeja (Colombia) |
| 20000 | Bart Swings | Belgium | 28:15.383 | 12 September 2012 | San Benedetto del Tronto (Italy) |
| 30000 | Derek Downing | United States | 48:42.179 | 28 August 1997 | Road Rash Nationals (United States) |
| 42195 (marathon) | Nolan Beddiaf | France | 53:55 | 19 September 2026 | Duluth (United States) |
| 50000 | Maurizio Lollobrigida | Italy | 1:21:29.102 | 28 August 1997 | Grenoble (France) |
| 84390 | Luca Presti | Italy | 2:14:37.000 | 3 November 1999 | Santiago (Chile) |
| 100000 | Philippe Boulard | France | 2:55:55 | September 1998 | New York (United States) |

Female
| Distance (m) | Skater | | Time | Date | Place | Ref |
|---|---|---|---|---|---|---|
| 100 | Geiny Pajaro | Colombia | 10.205 | 13 July 2019 | Barcelona (Spain) |
| 200 | J. Puello | Colombia | 17.677 | 27 August 2013 | Oostende (Belgium) |
| 300 | Andrea González | Argentina | 26.791 | 26 July 1999 | Winnipeg (Canada) |
| 500 | J. Caicedo | Colombia | 43.478 | 7 September 2006 | Anyang (Korea) |
| 1000 | Marisa Canafoglia | Italy | 1:28.014 | 28 August 1987 | Grenoble (France) |
| 1500 | Marisa Canafoglia | Italy | 2:14.122 | 28 August 1987 | Grenoble (France) |
| 2000 | Luz Mery Tristán | Colombia | 3:07.040 | 12 November 1990 | Bello (Colombia) |
| 3000 | Francesca Monteverde | Italy | 4:55.506 | 29 August 1987 | Grenoble (France) |
| 5000 | Simona Di Eugenio | Italy | 7:40.530 | 30 July 2003 | Padua (Italy) |
| 10000 | Hochen Yang | Chinese Taipei | 15:02.793 | 6 September 2006 | Anyang (Korea) |
| 15000 | Sheila Herrero | Spain | 24:57.820 | 2 August 2000 | Barrancabermeja (Colombia) |
| 20000 | Seul Lee | South Korea | 31.58.007 | 9 September 2008 | Gijon (Spain) |
| 21097 (1/2 marathon) | Adelia Marra | Italy | 35:02.930 | 28 August 1987 | Pamplona (Spain) |
| 30000 | Marisa Canafoglia | Italy | 52:38.640 | 28 August 1987 | Grenoble (France) |
| 40000 | Sheila Herrero | Spain | 1:18:01.000 | 3 October 1999 | Santiago (Chile) |
| 42195 (marathon) | | Argentina | 1:03:11 | 19 September 2026 | Duluth (United States) |
| 50000 | Marisa Canafoglia | Italy | 1:28:16.852 | 28 August 1987 | Grenoble (France) |

== See also ==
- Inline skating
- Freestyle slalom skating
- Road skating
