= Pibrac =

- Commune
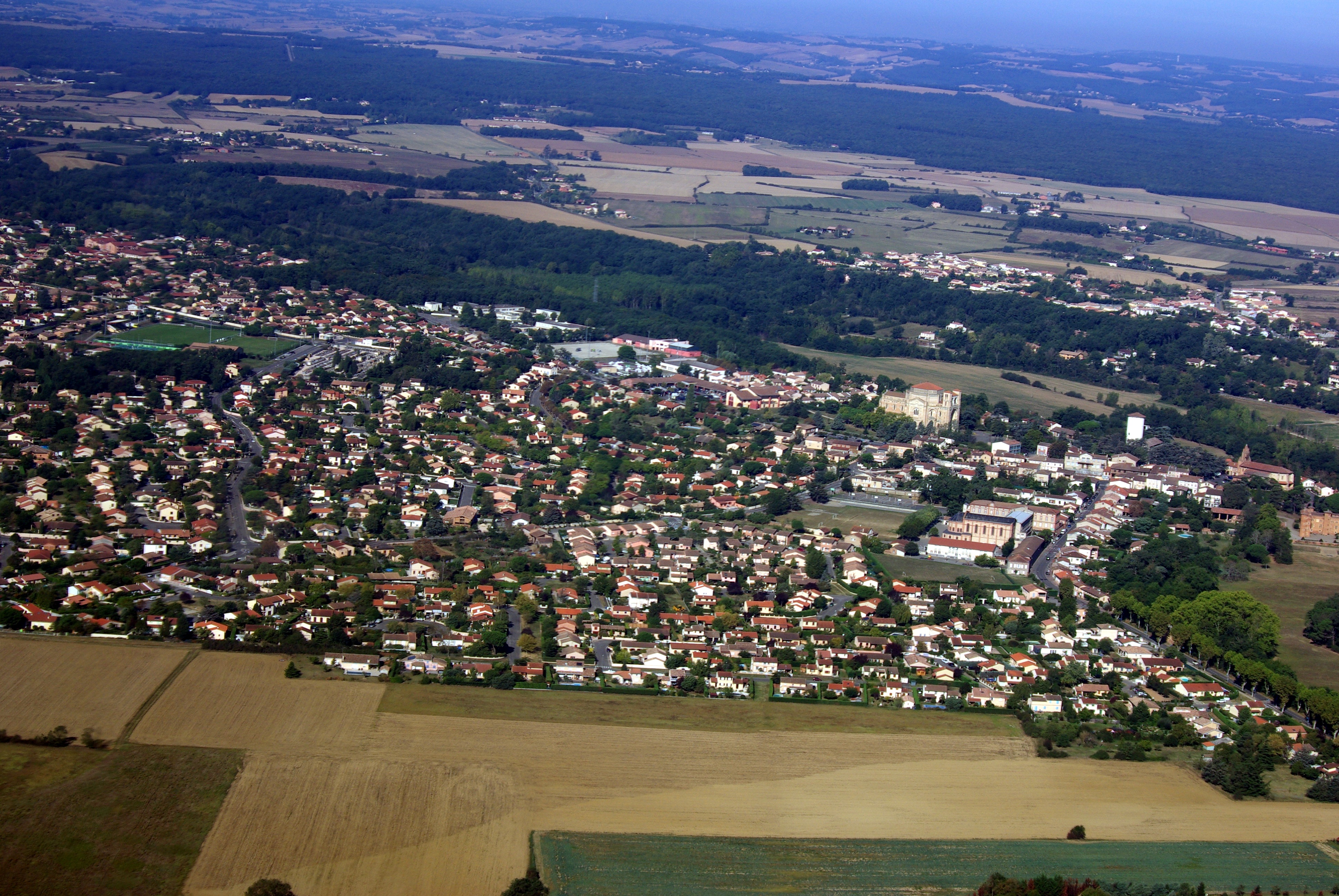
- An aerial view of Pibrac

- Coat of arms
- Location of Pibrac
- Location within France Location within Occitanie
- Coordinates: 43°37′03″N 1°17′08″E
- Country: France
- Region: Occitania
- Department: Haute-Garonne
- Arrondissement: Toulouse
- Canton: Toulouse-7
- Intercommunality: Toulouse Métropole

Government
  - Mayor (2024–2026): Denise Cortijo
- Area^{1}: 25.86 km^{2} (9.98 sq mi)
- Elevation: 157 m (515 ft)
- Highest elevation: 237 m (778 ft)
- Lowest elevation: 145 m (476 ft)
- Population (2023): 8,977
  - Density: 347.1/km^{2} (899.1/sq mi)
- Time zone: UTC+01:00 (CET)
  - Summer (DST): UTC+02:00 (CEST)
- INSEE/Postal code: 31417 /31820
- ^{1} French Land Register data, which excludes lakes, ponds, glaciers > 1 km^{2} (0.386 sq mi or 247 acres) and river estuaries.

Pibrac (French pronunciation: [pibʁak]) is a commune in the Haute-Garonne department in southwestern France, located 15 km (9.3 mi) west of Toulouse.

It has recently grown thanks to the development of the aeroplane industry in the nearby town of Blagnac.

== Population ==
The inhabitants of the commune are known as Pibracaises and Pibracais in French.

Historical population

Year	Pop.	±% p.a.
1793	567	—
1800	613	+1.12%
1806	715	+2.60%
1821	668	−0.45%
1831	747	+1.12%
1836	790	+1.13%
1841	757	−0.85%
1846	893	+3.36%
1851	834	−1.36%
1856	880	+1.08%
1861	914	+0.76%
1866	974	+1.28%
1872	931	−0.75%
1876	914	−0.46%
1881	926	+0.26%
1886	998	+1.51%
1891	998	+0.00%
1896	947	−1.04%
1901	886	−1.32%

Year	Pop.	±% p.a.
1906	769	−2.79%
1911	750	−0.50%
1921	726	−0.32%
1926	784	+1.55%
1931	688	−2.58%
1936	771	+2.30%
1946	829	+0.73%
1954	959	+1.84%
1962	1,036	+0.97%
1968	1,518	+6.57%
1975	2,291	+6.06%
1982	4,245	+9.21%
1990	5,879	+4.15%
1999	7,440	+2.65%
2007	7,755	+0.52%
2012	8,272	+1.30%
2017	8,459	+0.45%
2023	8,977	+1.00%

Source: EHESS and INSEE (1968-2023)

== Sport ==
Pibrac has a patinodrome, a track for inline speed skating, as well as many other sporting facilities.

== Personalities ==
It was the birthplace of Saint Germaine Cousin.

== Monuments ==
The Château de Pibrac is a converted 16th century castle which is listed as a historic site by the French Ministry of Culture.

== Gallery ==
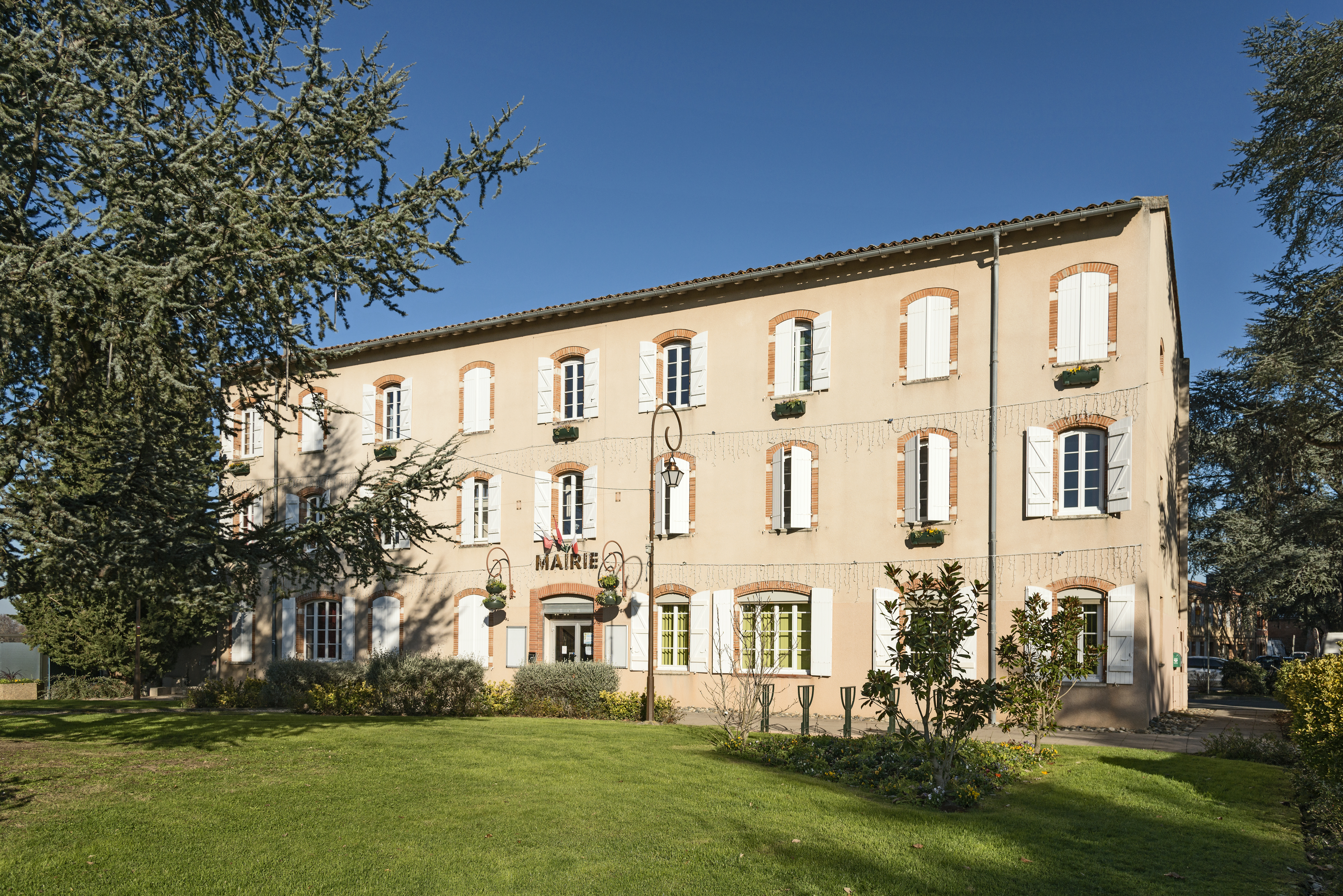
Town hall

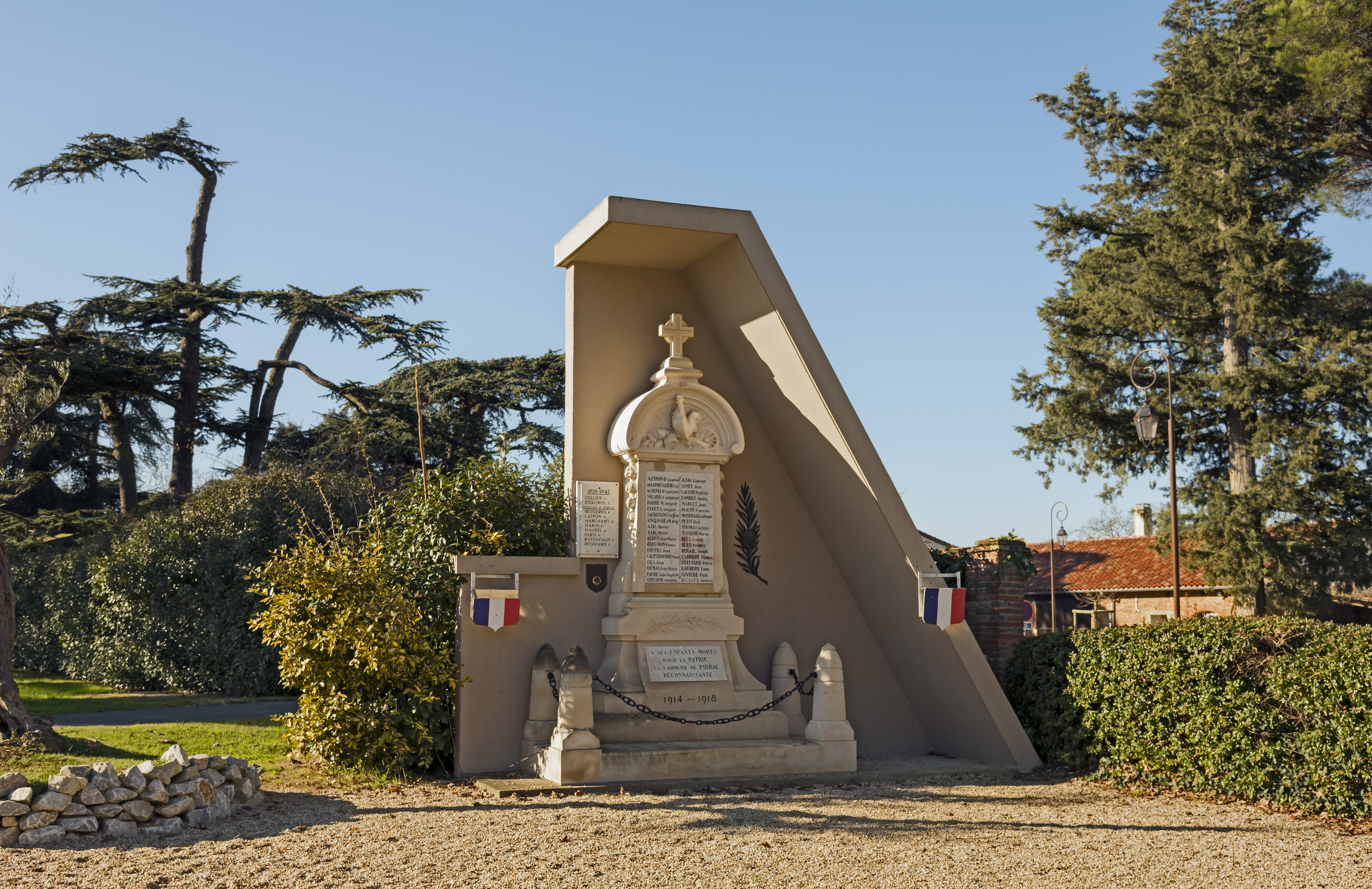
War memorial

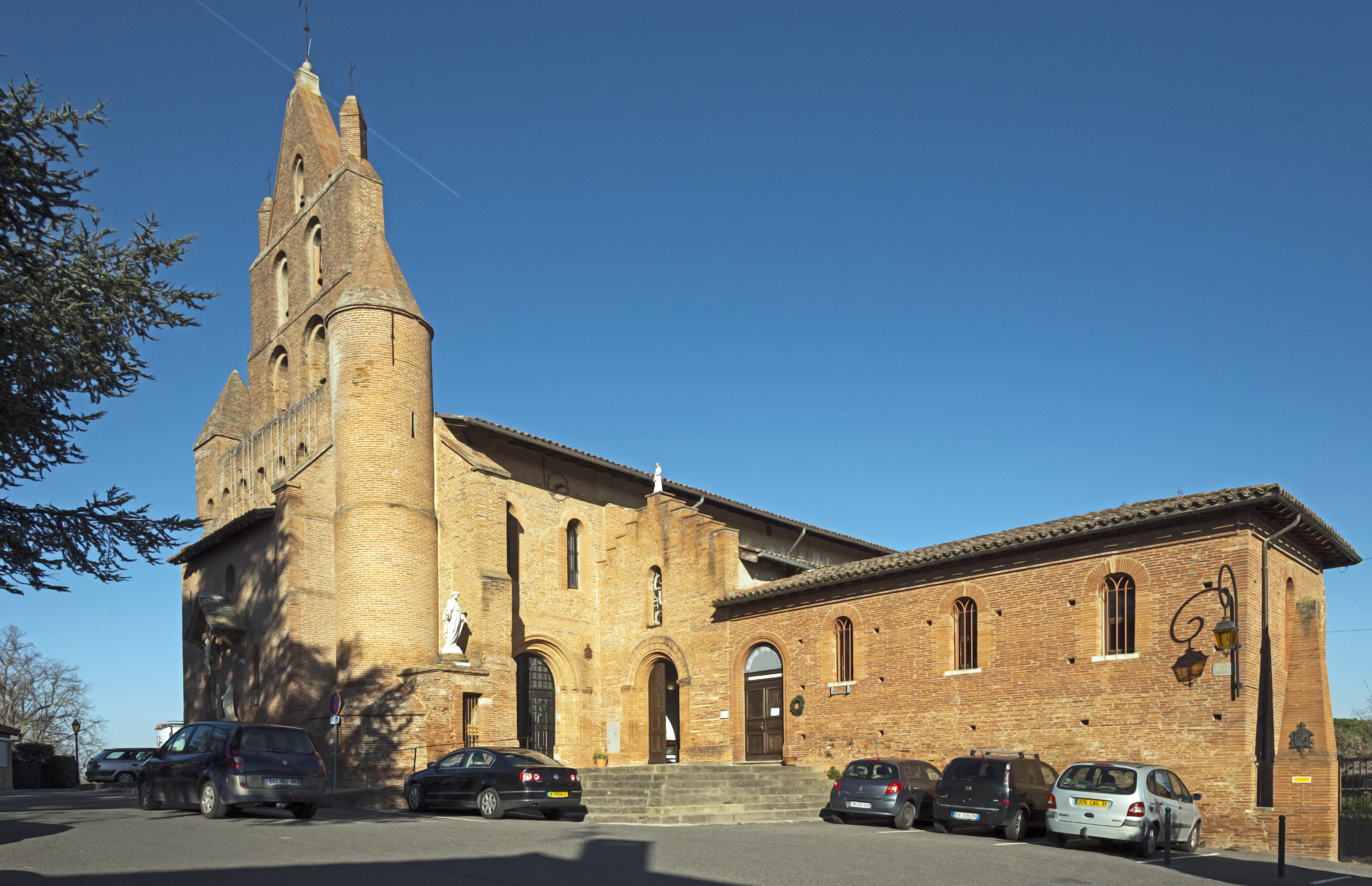
Church Sainte-Marie-Madeleine

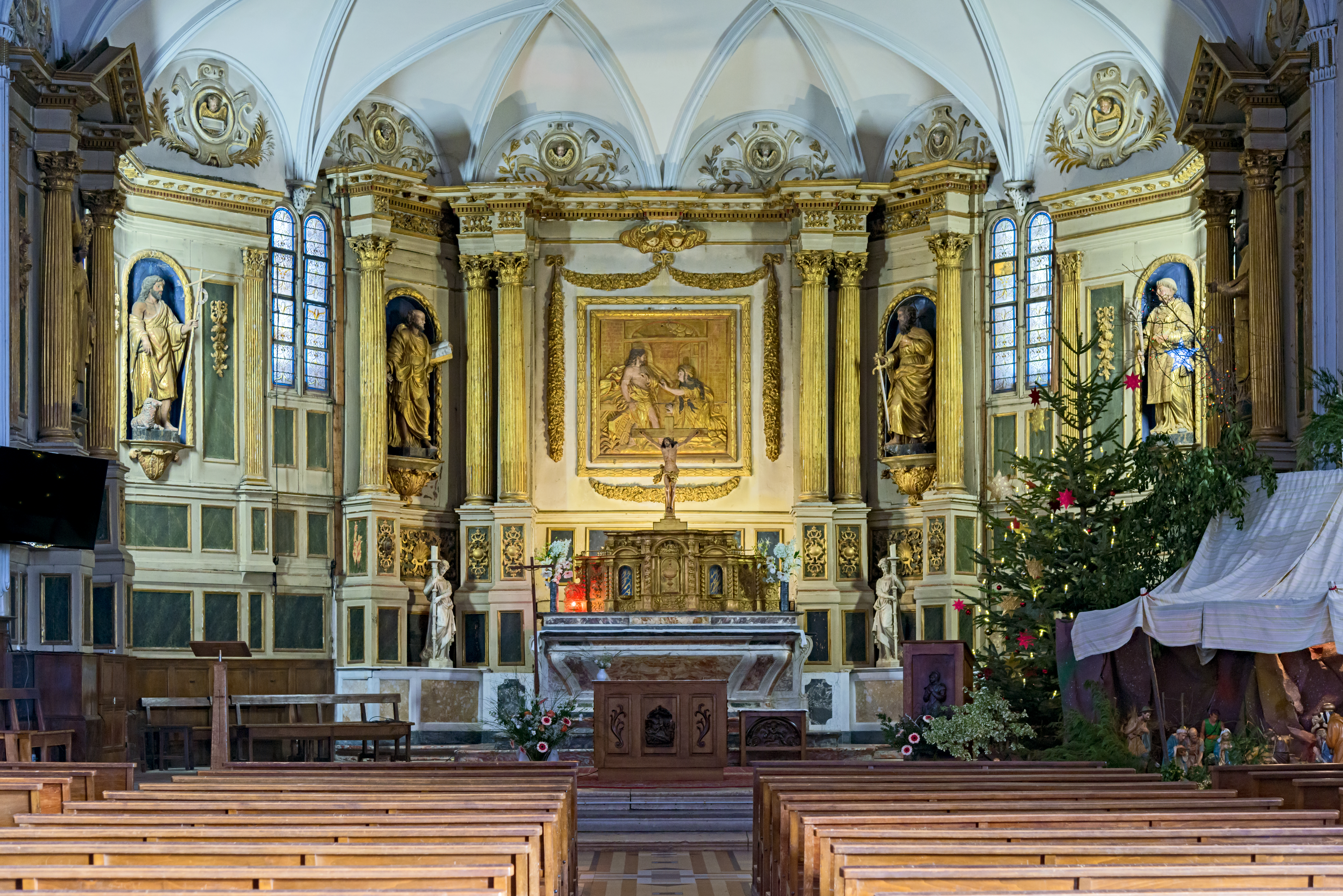
Church Sainte-Marie-Madeleine

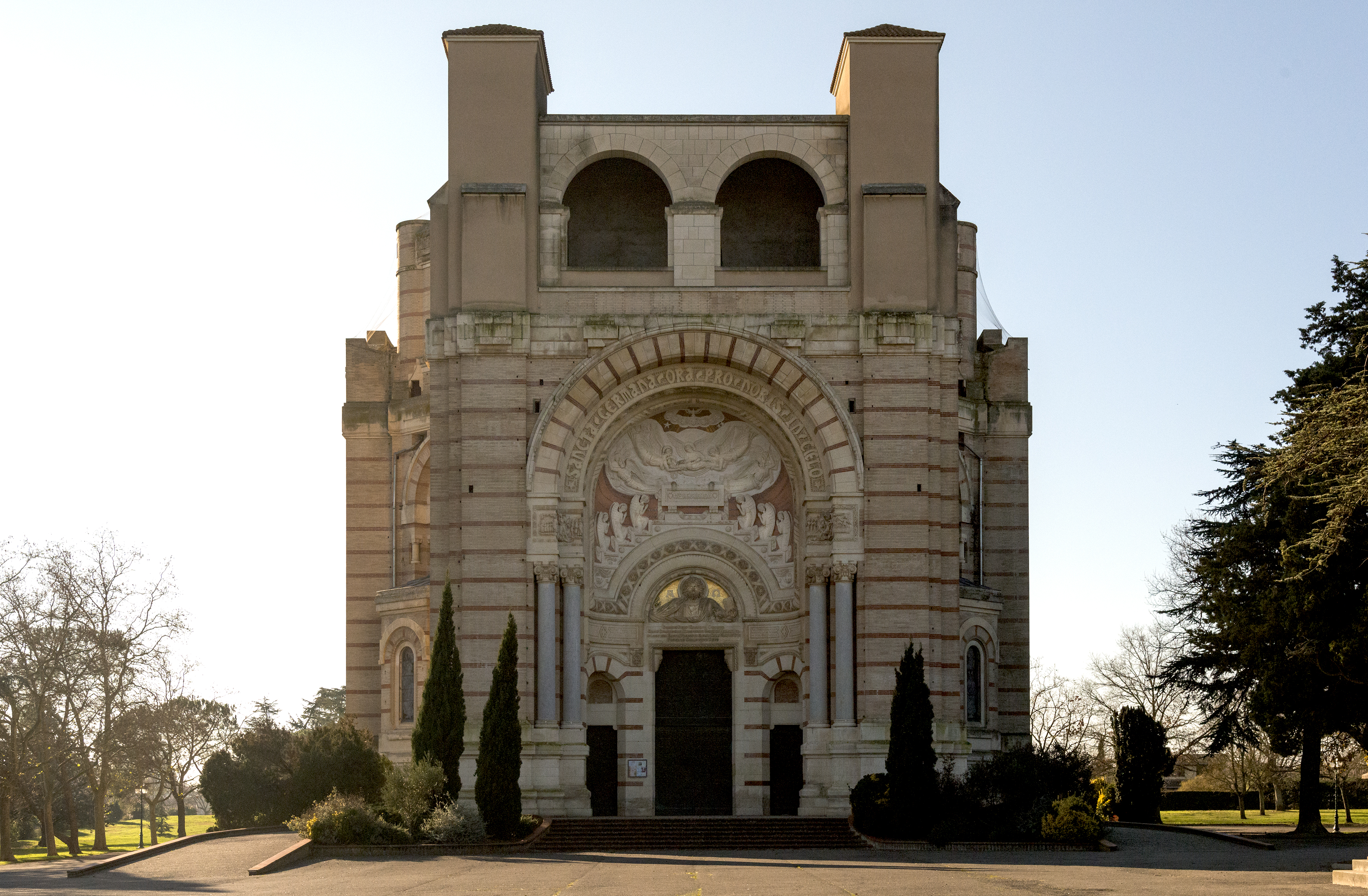
Basilica of St. Germaine

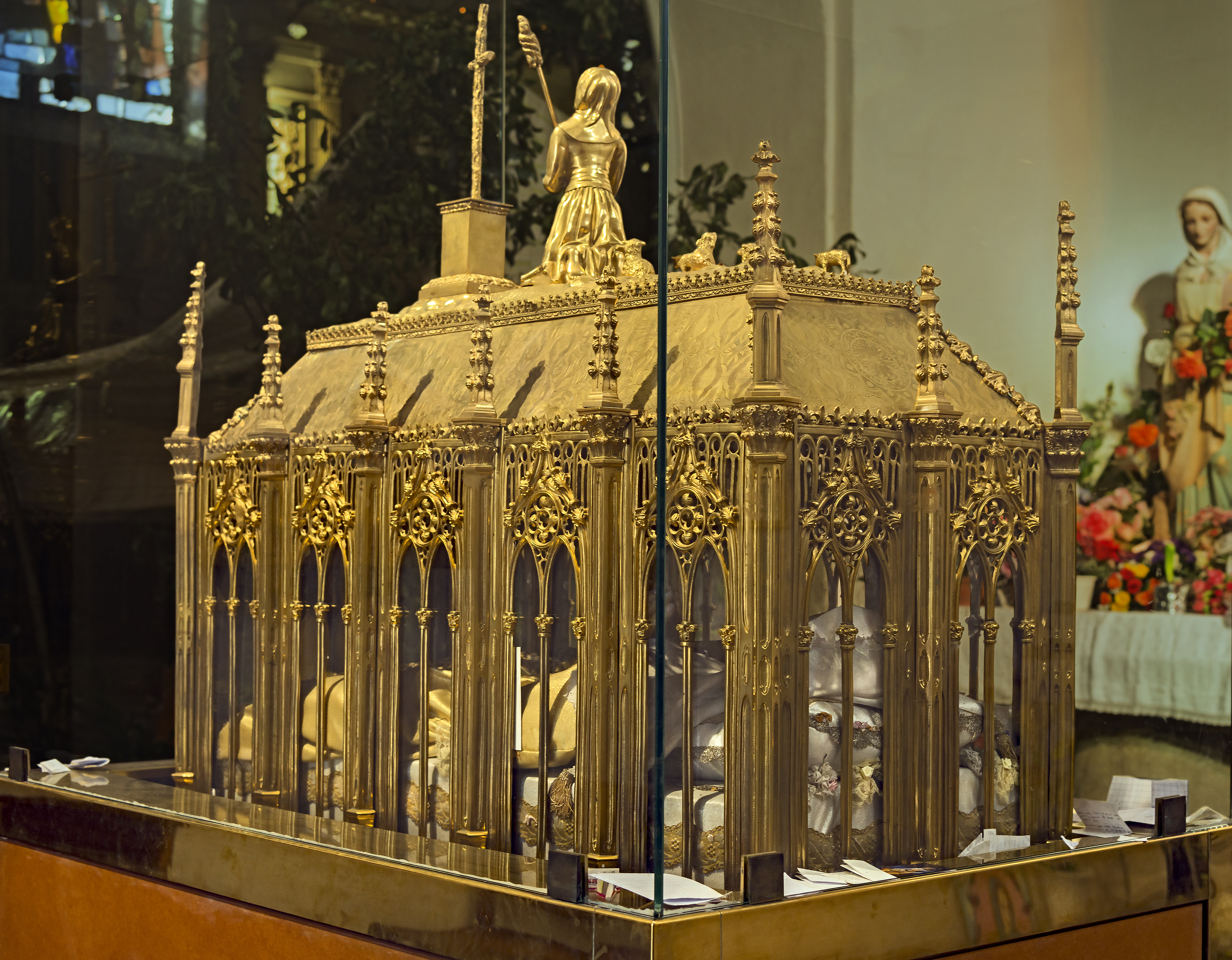
The reliquary of Sainte-Germaine

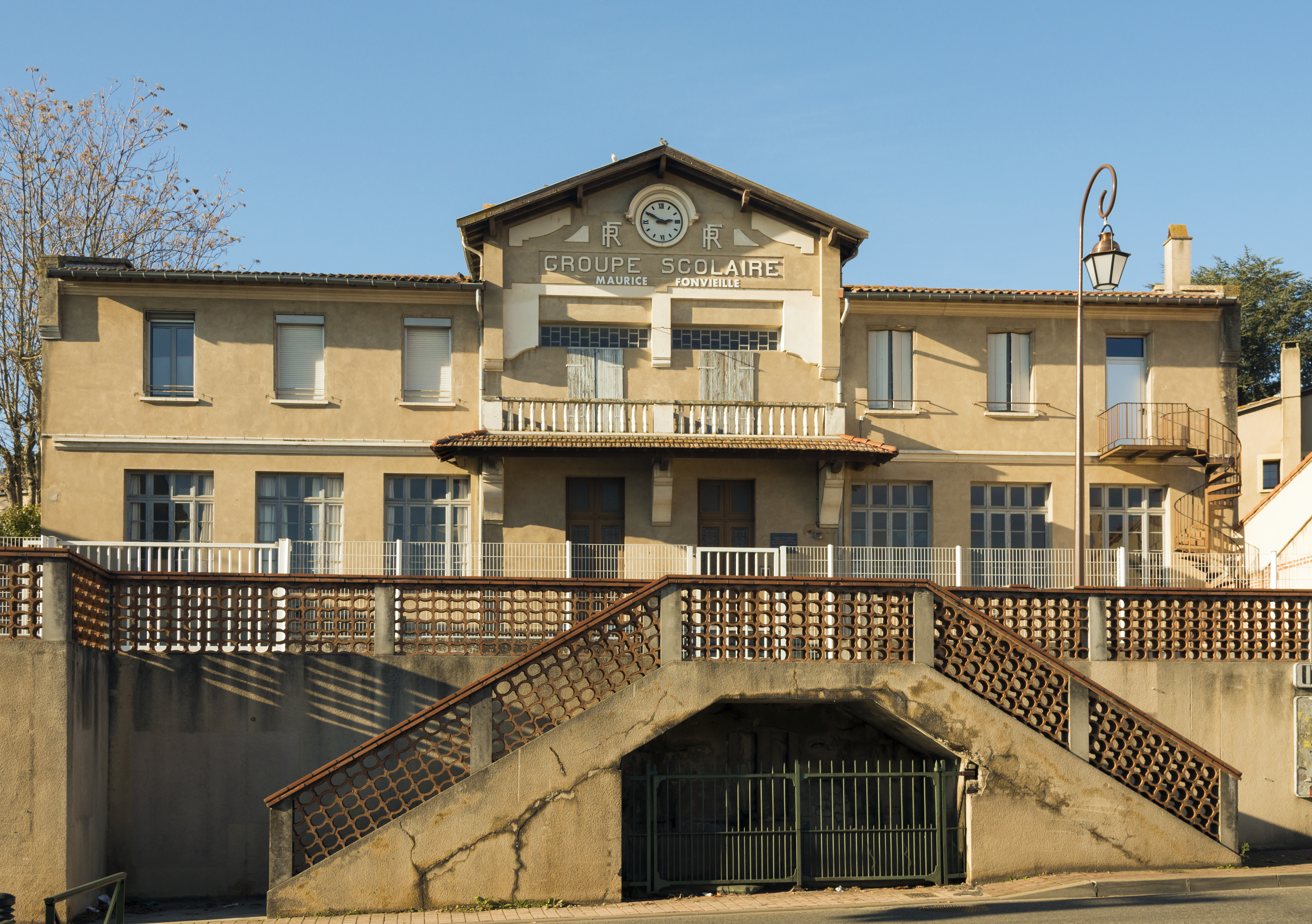

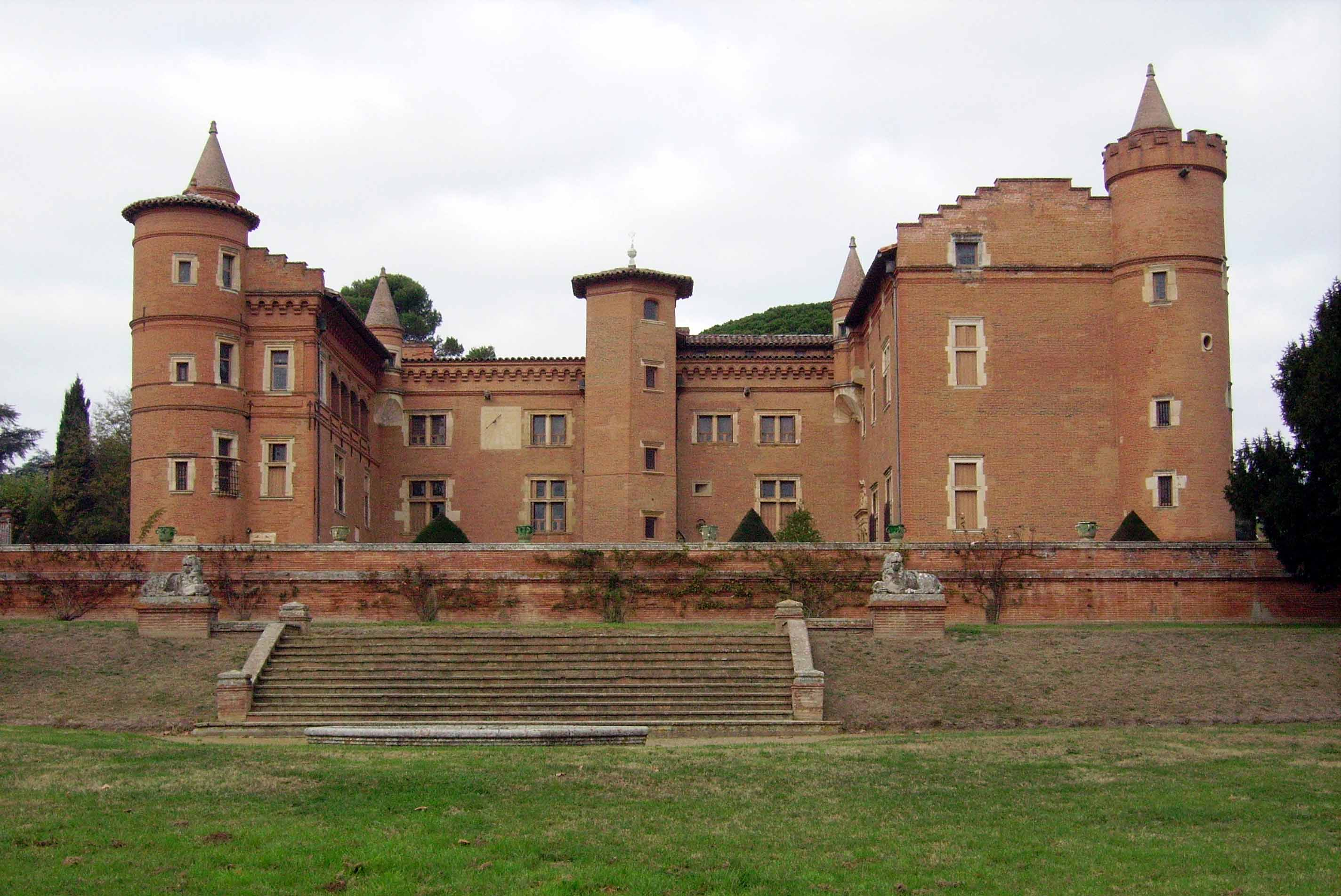

== See also ==
- Communes of the Haute-Garonne department
