= Coventry Roller Derby =

English roller derby league

- Metro area: Coventry
- Country: United Kingdom
- Founded: March 2011
- Track type: Flat
- Venue: Alan Higgs Centre, Coventry, UK
- Website: www.facebook.com/CoventryRollerDerby

Coventry Roller Derby (CRD) formerly known as Coventry City Derby Dolls (CCDD) are Coventry's first and only flat track roller derby league based in Coventry, United Kingdom.

== History ==
The idea for the league began in March 2011 among a small group of friends, none of whom had previous roller derby experience and who, like many newcomers to the sport, had discovered roller derby after its popularisation in the 2009 film Whip It.

The group began by learning basic skating skills in a small fitness studio in Coventry's AT7 Centre. On 16 August 2011, the group (now 8–10 regular skaters) had their first official outing at the Goodwood Roller Marathon, under the name Coventry City Derby Dolls. Soon after, CCDD outgrew their original training venue and began regular training sessions at Coventry Sports and Leisure Centre, before the centre closed in 2019.

The team changed their name to Coventry Roller Derby (CRD).

== Structure ==
CRD are a skater-run organisation. A committee of elected officers manages the league. These officers head up sub-committees in areas such as: Coaching, Referee Training, Head NSO, Merchandise Officer, Events Organisers, Social Media Officer, League Liaison, etc.

== Coaching ==
CCDD started with two dedicated Coaches: Head Coach and Club President Jon Scott (AKA Scott Jon DaRocks), and Newbie/Rookie Coach Paul Husiw-Aiken (AKA Hucifer), as well as a team of CCDD Referees who are trained under Head Referee Andy 'Psychotic' Hill. In addition to their in-house coaching team, CCDD received valuable input and guest coach appearances from fellow Midlands roller derby teams: Crash Test Brummies, Central City Rollergirls and Birmingham Blitz Dames.

== Bouts played ==
CCDD made their public bouting debut 25 August 2013. Dubbed 'It Came From Outer Bounds' and held at Coventry Sports and Leisure Centre (Cov. baths) against Oxford Wheels of Glory. Half time was called with a score of CCDD, 123 – OWG, 42. OWG made a good comeback in the second half bringing the bout to a nail biting conclusion of CCDD, 179 – OWG, 184. Coventry City Derby Dolls raised a total of £273.00 with sales of cake and raffle tickets during the bout for the local charity Coventry Haven.

In 2014, CCDD bouted in a zombie-themed event against the Surrey Rollergirls.

== Events and appearances ==
Some of CCDD appeared at an interactive roller derby demo in Broadgate, Coventry, on 30 March 2013, where they were invited to participate in a game of human pinball as part of Coventry University's Design Degree Show 2013. This event marked the first time roller derby had been seen in the city, drawing much interest from within the local community.

In 2014, CDDD took part in a drive to boost local blood stocks.

In 2014, CCDD player Jodie Ramsay represented the West Indies at the Blood and Thunder World Cup event in Dallas, Texas.
