= Patinódromo Municipal =

Roller rink in Mar del Plata, Argentina

Patinódromo Municipal Adalberto Lugea
- Interactive map of Patinódromo Municipal Adalberto Lugea
- Location: Mar del Plata, Argentina
- Coordinates: 38°01′06.5″S 57°34′40.4″W
- Capacity: 7,500
- Field size: 45 x 24 m

Construction
- Opened: 1969

Tenant
- Municipality of General Pueyrredón

The Patinódromo Municipal Adalberto Lugea is an outdoor roller rink and patinodrome in Mar del Plata, Argentina. It is mostly used for inline speed skating competitions but has also hosted tennis tournaments and concerts.

== History ==
Roller sports are very popular in Mar del Plata since the early 60s, and in 1966 the city hosted the first World Championship of inline speed skating on road surface held out of Europe. The municipal skating rink was opened in 1969 to host a second world championship, this time on track surface. The original building had only two stands, one in front of the other, on the sides of the track. After 1969, this venue hosted again the world championships of 1978, 1983 and 1997, this last time including road and track events. In order to adapt its capacity and facilities to the requirements of international competitions, remodellation works were started before the 1995 Pan American Games. New stands were built and the whole perimeter of the rink was closed, raising its capacity to 7,500 spectators. The old stands were refurbished and turned into VIP stands for 800 spectators, with press area and cabin for judges. For the 1995 Pan American Games held in Mar del Plata, the roller skater Nora Vega, original from the city, was chosen to be the last torch bearer and to light the Pan American Cauldron during the opening ceremony. Vega would end up winning two gold medals, a silver and a bronze medal during the games and received the Golden Olimpia Award as the most important sportsperson of 1995 in Argentina. The patinodrome is named after Adalberto Lugea, a skater of Unión de Mar del Plata that broke the world record for most consecutive hours on skates in 1947, reaching 50 hours and 25 minutes of non stop skating.

== Facilities ==
Beneath the stands there is a gym, coffee house, locker rooms, administrative offices and emergency room. The skating rink area also offers bedrooms to accommodate up to 60 athletes. As Mar del Plata is home to Argentine Bandy Union, the center of the track, a 1080m2 area, is used to practice this sport and also for inline hockey matches. The Patinódromo Municipal is part of Teodoro Bronzini Municipal Sports Park, a 35 hectares area with several sport venues, including the Estadio José María Minella, the "Julio Polet" Municipal Velodrome, the Pan American Field Hockey Stadium, the "Alberto Zorrilla" Natatorium, the Justo Roman Athletic stadium and the Polideportivo Islas Malvinas.

== Events ==
This venue has hosted four World Championship, the roller sports events for the 1995 Pan American Games and the inline speed skating events for the 2006 South American Games. It has also hosted the Mar del Plata Open tennis tournament, the 2014 Davis Cup first round between Argentina and Italy, several boxing fights (including South American Super middleweight champion Ruben Eduardo Acosta vs. Luis Daniel Parada in 2007), and many concerts, including of Patricio Rey y sus Redonditos de Ricota (1997, 1999), Deep Purple (1999), Soda Stereo (1991), Los Piojos (2004, 2006), Diego Torres (2007), La Renga (1999, 2004, 2005), Bersuit Vergarabat (2004, 2008), El Tri (1999), Luis Alberto Spinetta (1991) and Billy Idol (1991).

== See also ==
- Estadio José María Minella
- Polideportivo Islas Malvinas
