= Germaine Cousin =

French Roman Catholic saint

Saint Germaine Cousin
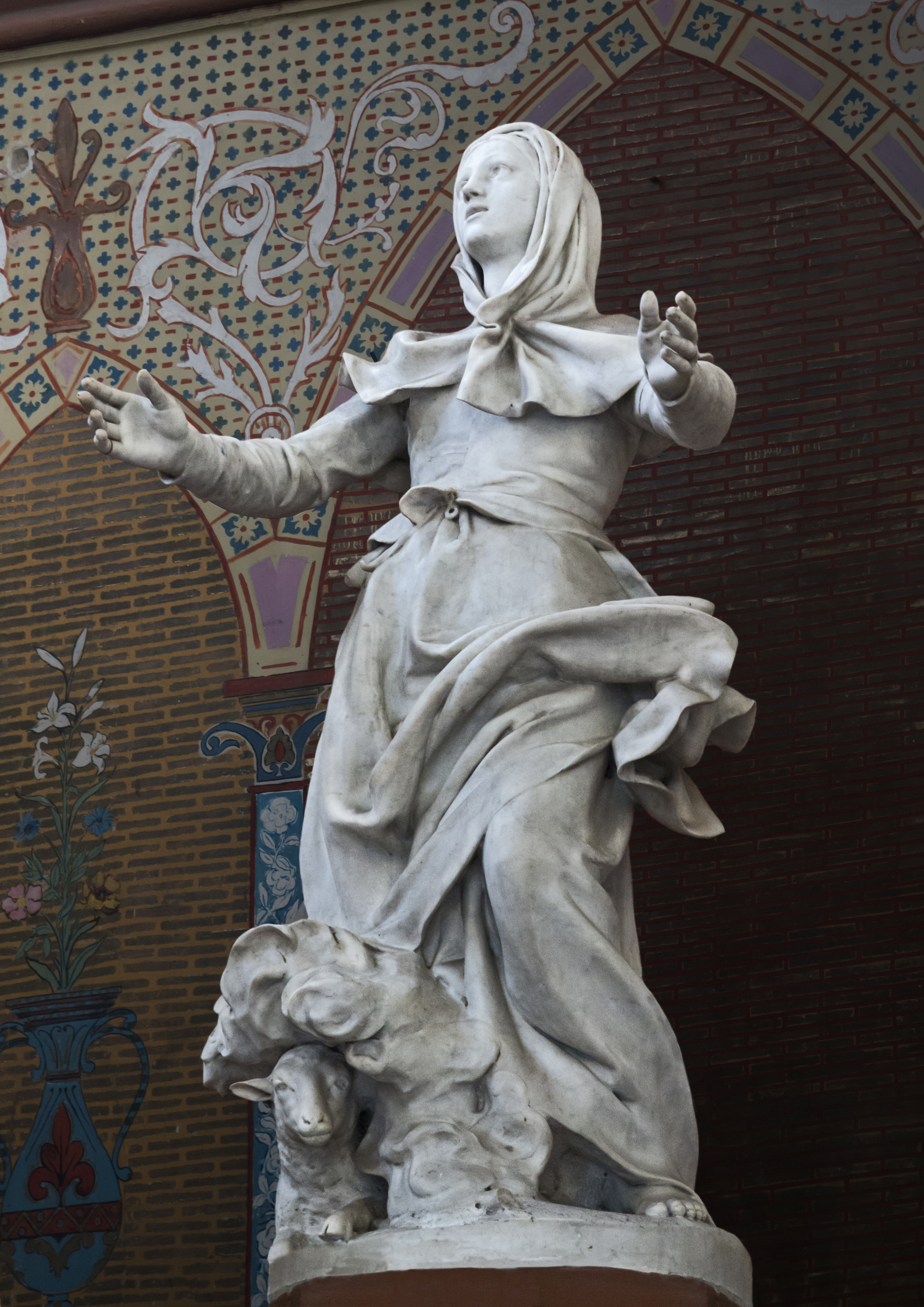
- Born: 1579; Pibrac, France
- Died: 1601; Pibrac, France
- Venerated in: Roman Catholic Church
- Beatified: 7 May 1854
- Canonized: 29 June 1867 by Pope Pius IX
- Major shrine: Pibrac
- Feast: June 15
- Patronage: abandoned people; disabled people

Germaine Cousin, also Germana Cousin, Germaine of Pibrac, or Germana, (1579–1601) was a French saint. She was born in 1579 to humble parents at Pibrac, a village 15 km (9.3 mi) from Toulouse.

== Narrative ==
Of her, the Catholic Encyclopedia writes:

From her birth she seemed marked out for suffering; she came into the world with a deformed hand and the disease of scrofula, and, while yet an infant, lost her mother. Her father soon married again, but his second wife treated Germaine with much cruelty. Under pretence of saving the other children from the contagion of scrofula she persuaded the father to keep Germaine away from the homestead, and thus the child was employed almost from infancy as a shepherdess. When she returned at night, her bed was in the stable or on a litter of vine branches in a garret. In this hard school Germaine learned early to practice humility and patience. She was gifted with a marvelous sense of the presence of God and of spiritual things, so that her lonely life became to her a source of light and blessing... Her love for Jesus in the Blessed Sacrament and for His Virgin Mary Virgin Mother presaged the saint. She assisted daily at the Holy Sacrifice; when the bell rang, she fixed her sheep-hook or distaff in the ground, and left her flocks to the care of Providence while she heard Mass. Although the pasture was on the border of a forest infested with wolves, no harm ever came to her flocks.

She is said to have practiced many austerities as reparation for the sacrileges perpetrated by heretics in the neighboring churches. She frequented the Sacraments of Penance and the Holy Eucharist, and it was observed that her piety increased on the approach of every feast of the Virgin Mary. The villagers are said to have inclined at first to treat her piety with mild derision, until certain signs of God's signal favor made her an object of reverence and awe.

The ford in winter, after heavy rains or the melting of snow, was at times impassable. On several occasions the swollen waters were seen to open and afford her a passage without wetting her garments. Notwithstanding her poverty, she found means to help the poor by sharing with them her allowance of bread. According to one story, one day in winter, when she was being chased by her stepmother who accused her of stealing bread, she opened her apron and fresh summer flowers fell out. She offered the flowers to her stepmother as a sign of forgiveness.

Her father at last came to a sense of his duty, forbade her stepmother henceforth to treat her harshly, and wished to give her a place in the home with his other children, but Germaine begged to be allowed to remain in the humbler position. At this point, when men were beginning to realize the beauty of her life, she died. One morning in the early summer of 1601, her father found that she had not risen at the usual hour and went to call her, finding her dead on her pallet of vine-twigs. She was 22 years old at the time.

== Relics and veneration ==
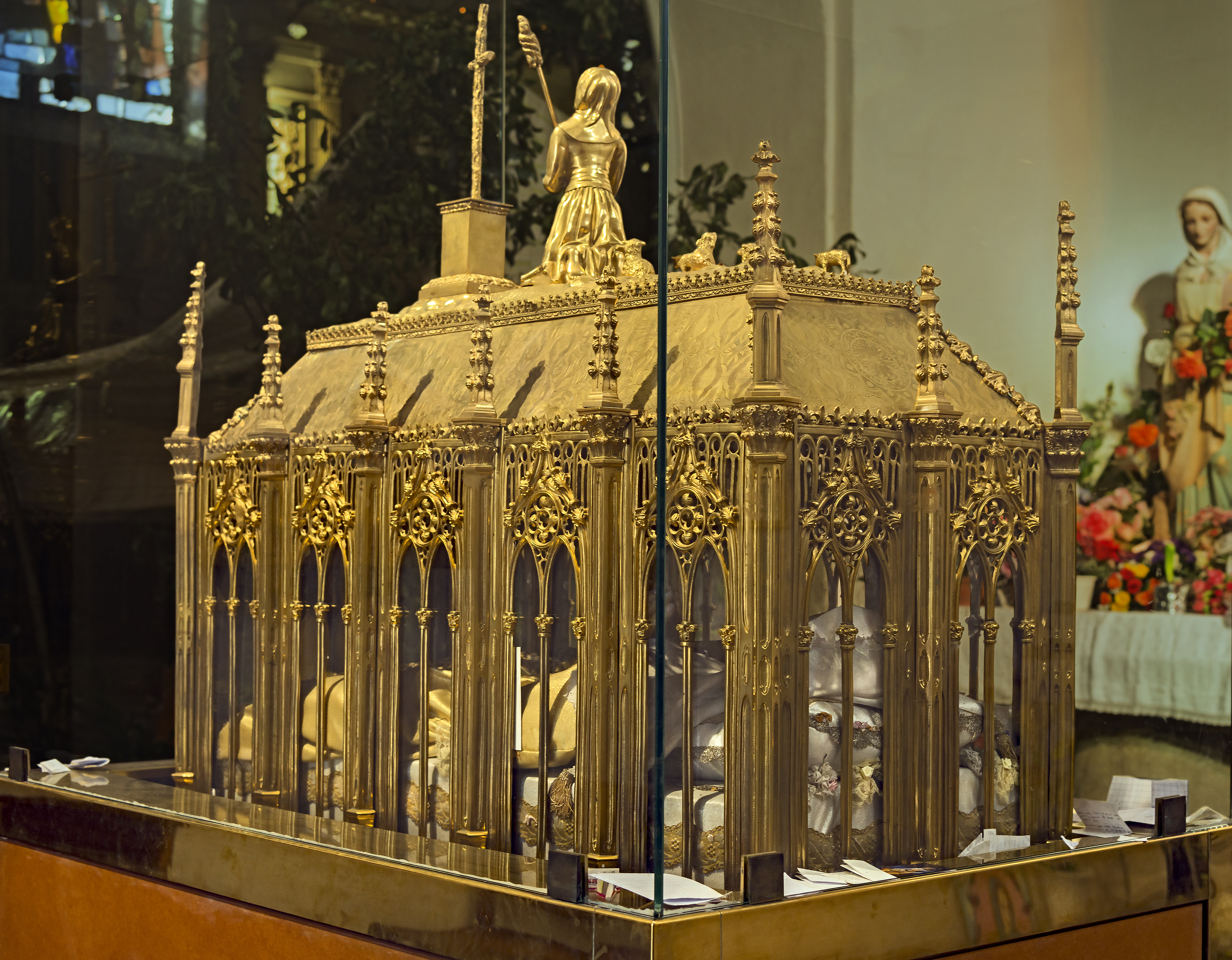
Reliquary with her body, 1854

Her remains were buried in the parish church of Pibrac in front of the pulpit. In 1644, when the grave was opened to receive one of her relatives, the body of Germaine was discovered fresh and perfectly preserved. It was exposed for public view near the pulpit, until a noble lady, the wife of François de Beauregard, presented as a thanks-offering a casket of lead to hold the remains. Her infant son whose life was despaired of was restored to health on her seeking the intercession of Germaine. This was the first of a long series of wonderful cures wrought at her relics. The leaden casket was placed in the sacristy, and in 1661 and 1700 the remains were viewed and found fresh and intact by the vicars-general of Toulouse, who have left testamentary depositions of the fact.

Expert medical evidence deposed that the body had not been embalmed, and experimental tests showed that the preservation was not due to any property inherent in the soil. In 1700 a movement was begun to procure the beatification of Germaine, but it fell through owing to accidental causes. In 1793 the casket was desecrated by a revolutionary tinsmith, named Toulza, who with three accomplices took out the remains and buried them in the sacristy, throwing quick-lime and water on them. After the Revolution, her body was found to be still intact save where the quick-lime had done its work.

The private veneration of Germaine had continued from the original finding of the body in 1644, supported and encouraged by numerous cures and miracles. The cause of beatification was resumed in 1850. The documents attested more than 400 miracles or extraordinary graces, and thirty postulatory letters from archbishops and bishops in France besought the beatification from the Holy See. The miracles attested were cures of every kind (of blindness, congenital and resulting from disease, of hip and spinal disease), besides the multiplication of food for the distressed community of the Good Shepherd at Bourges in 1845.

On 7 May 1854, Pius IX proclaimed her beatification. He proclaimed her a saint on 29 June 1867, the day on which a vast assembly of prelates gathered in Rome to mark the 18th centenary of the martyrdom of Peter the Apostle, and he congratulated the archbishop of Toulouse, Florian Desprez, and his diocese for giving the church a saint "so powerful, so kind, and so dear to its heart". Her feast is kept in the Diocese of Toulouse on 15 June. She is represented in art with a shepherd's crook or with a distaff; with a watchdog, or a sheep; or with flowers in her apron.

== Bibliography ==
- Lacointa, Jules (1897). La vie de son Éminence le Cardinal Desprez, Archevêque de Toulouse (in French). Lille: La Société de Saint Augustin. p. 88ff.
