= Florian Desprez =

French Catholic prelate (1807–1895)

His Eminence Florian Desprez
- Cardinal, Archbishop of Toulouse
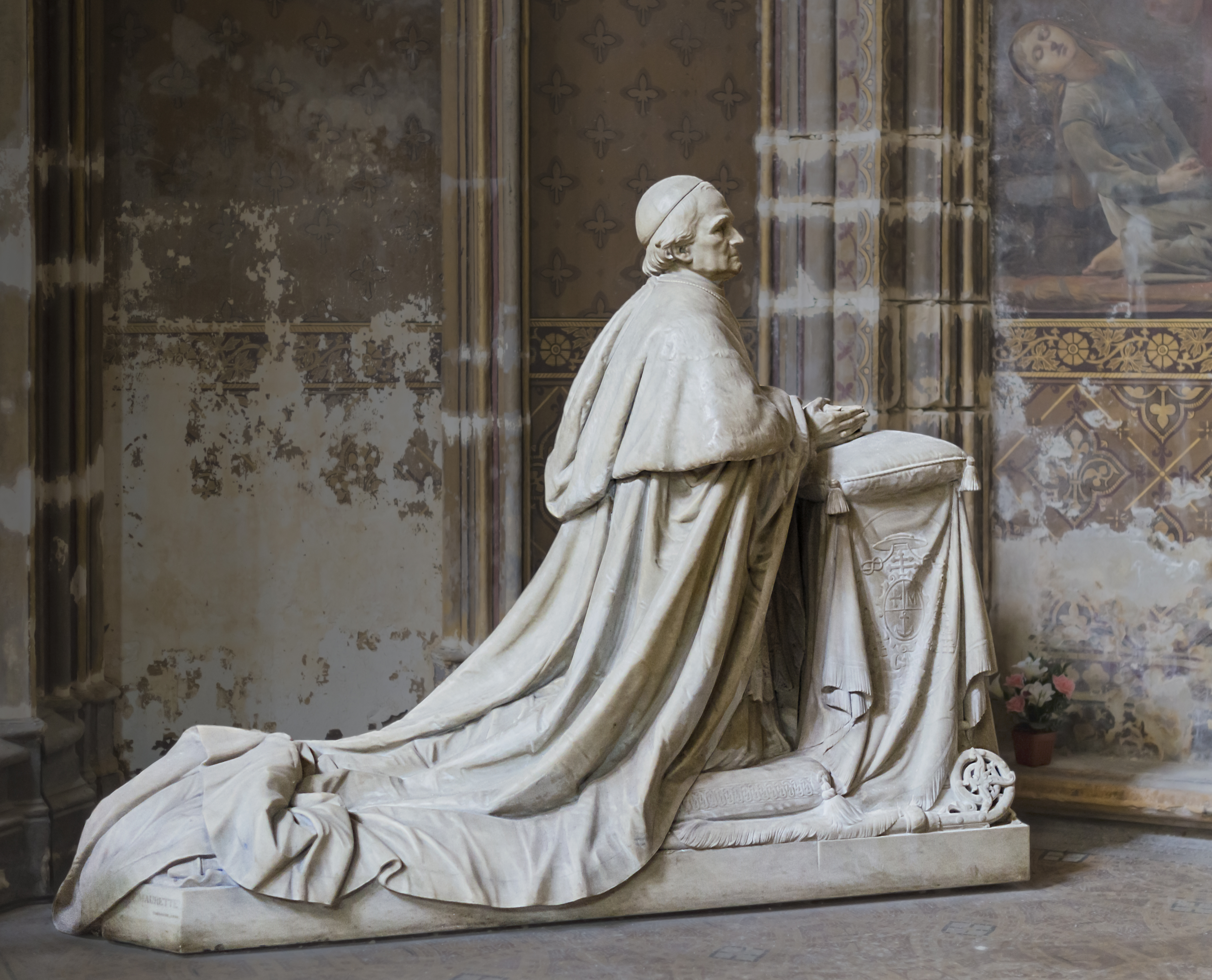
- Statue of Desprez kneeling at prayer, Toulouse Cathedral
- Church: Catholic
- See: Toulouse
- Installed: 16 September 1859
- Term ended: 21 January 1895
- Predecessor: Jean-Marie Mioland
- Successor: François-Désiré Mathieu
- Other post: Cardinal-Priest of Santi Marcellino e Pietro
- Previous posts: Bishop of Saint-Denis de La Réunion (1851–1857); Bishop of Limoges (1857–1859)

Orders
- Ordination: 19 December 1829 by Louis Belmas
- Consecration: 5 January 1851 by René-François Régnier
- Created cardinal: 12 May 1879 by Pope Leo XIII
- Rank: Cardinal Priest

Personal details
- Born: Julien Florian Félix Desprez (Note: He was baptized "Julien Florian Felix Desprez". That full name appears in the most sources: on the stone that marks his tomb in the Cathedral of Saint Stephen in Toulouse, a biography written when he was made a cardinal, an obituary, a biographical sketch published shortly after his death, and a biography. The Bibliothèque nationale de France and the French National Archives use these three forenames in this sequence. When he was made a cardinal, the Holy See dropped his third forename and recorded him in Latin as "Julianus Florianus Desprez" and in Italian as "Iuliano Floriano Desprez". Some sources related to the First Vatican Council omit his second and third forenames: "Julien Desprez". From his earliest years he used "Florian" as his sole given name. He signed his will "Fl., Card. Desprez". His pastoral letter to the clergy of Toulouse in 1869 prints his full baptismal name on the title page and records his signature on the letter as "FLORIAN, Archev. de Toulouse". Similarly, he signed a letter to Pope Pius IX in Latin "FLORIANUS, Archiepus Tolosanus" and the pope replied to "FLORIANO Archiepiscopo Tolosano". On the other hand, modern compilations of biographical information about the Catholic Church hierarchy or the College of Cardinals depart from these 19th-century sources in two ways: they transpose the names Julien and Florian and substitute "Jules" for "Julien".); 14 April 1807 Marseille, France
- Died: 21 January 1895 (aged 87) Toulouse
- Denomination: Catholic
- Motto: Spes Nostra Firma
- Coat of arms

Julien Florian Félix Desprez, who used the name Florian Desprez (14 April 1807 – 21 January 1895) was a French prelate of the Catholic Church, who became a bishop in 1850, first in Réunion from 1850 to 1857 and then in Limoges until 1859. He spent 36 years of his ecclesiastical career as archbishop of Toulouse from 1859 to 1895. He was made a cardinal in 1879.

== Early years ==
Florian Desprez was born in Ostricourt, Nord, on 14 April 1807. He was the eldest of three children born to a family of modest means; an uncle was a priest and an aunt a religious sister. He studied at the Royal College of Douai from 1819 to 1824. He then entered the Major Seminary of Cambrai. Immediately upon his ordination as a priest on 19 December 1829 he was appointed vicar of the cathedral church in Cambrai. His sister Justine, then seventeen years old, joined him there and lived with him throughout his career, including during his overseas assignment, until her death 63 years later on 23 November 1892.

In February 1834 he was assigned as a parish priest to Pont-à-Marcq, a poor village south of Lille, and then in September 1843 as pastor (curé-doyen) in Templeuve and in February 1847 as pastor of the newly established parish of Notre Dame in Roubaix, an industrial center.

== Bishop ==
After negotiations between the Holy See and the French government resulted in the erection of several dioceses in French island colonies in 1850, (Note: In addition to Réunion, dioceses were erected in Fort-de-France (Martinique) and Basse-Terre (Guadeloupe).) Desprez was appointed the first bishop of Saint-Denis-de-La Réunion on 3 October 1850. (Note: The new diocese was so unfamiliar that one Italian publication referred to it in 1855 as "Réunion o San Denis in Affrica [sic]".) As a mission territory, his see was overseen directly from Rome. He received his episcopal consecration on 5 January 1851 in his parish church in Roubaix from René-François Régnier, archbishop of Cambrai. The Belgian bishops of Bruges and Ghent were the co-consecrators. (Note: Also present was a prelate of the Syriac Catholic Church, Giovanni Matteo Nakar, bishop of Nabk, Syria, since 1835, of whom little is known.) He chose as his motto Spes Nostra Firma, "Our hope is steadfast" (2 Corinthians 1:7).

Desprez sailed from France on 6 March; he disembarked on 21 May and took possession of his see on 25 May 1851. He concentrated initially on diocesan organization, establishing the independence of the Church from government authorities who had heretofore been allowed to interfere, and creating societies for the men and women in each parish. After two and a half years, he interrupted his work in Réunion for a sixteen-month journey to Europe, leaving on 20 December 1853 and returning on 27 April 1855. He made his ad limina visit to Rome en route to Paris and was honored with the title Assistant at the Papal Throne on 28 March 1854. He spent most of his time in France, but also visited Rome to participate in the proclamation of the doctrine of the Immaculate Conception on 8 December 1854 and the consecration of the Basilica of Saint Paul Outside the Walls two days later. After returning to Réunion, on 9 October 1856 he laid the cornerstone of the diocesan cathedral, a festive event in which the new governor of the colony participated to demonstrate that he did not share his predecessor's antagonistic attitude toward the Church. (Note: The building was never completed and was a ruin at the end of the nineteenth century.) During his tenure in Réunion he made five pastoral visits to the parishes of his diocese. He also founded an orphanage, two colleges staffed by the Jesuits, and a shelter sufficient to accommodate 400 patients with leprosy.

He was transferred to the see of Limoges on 19 March 1857. (Note: News of his transfer only reached him in Réunion on 9 April.)

== Archbishop ==
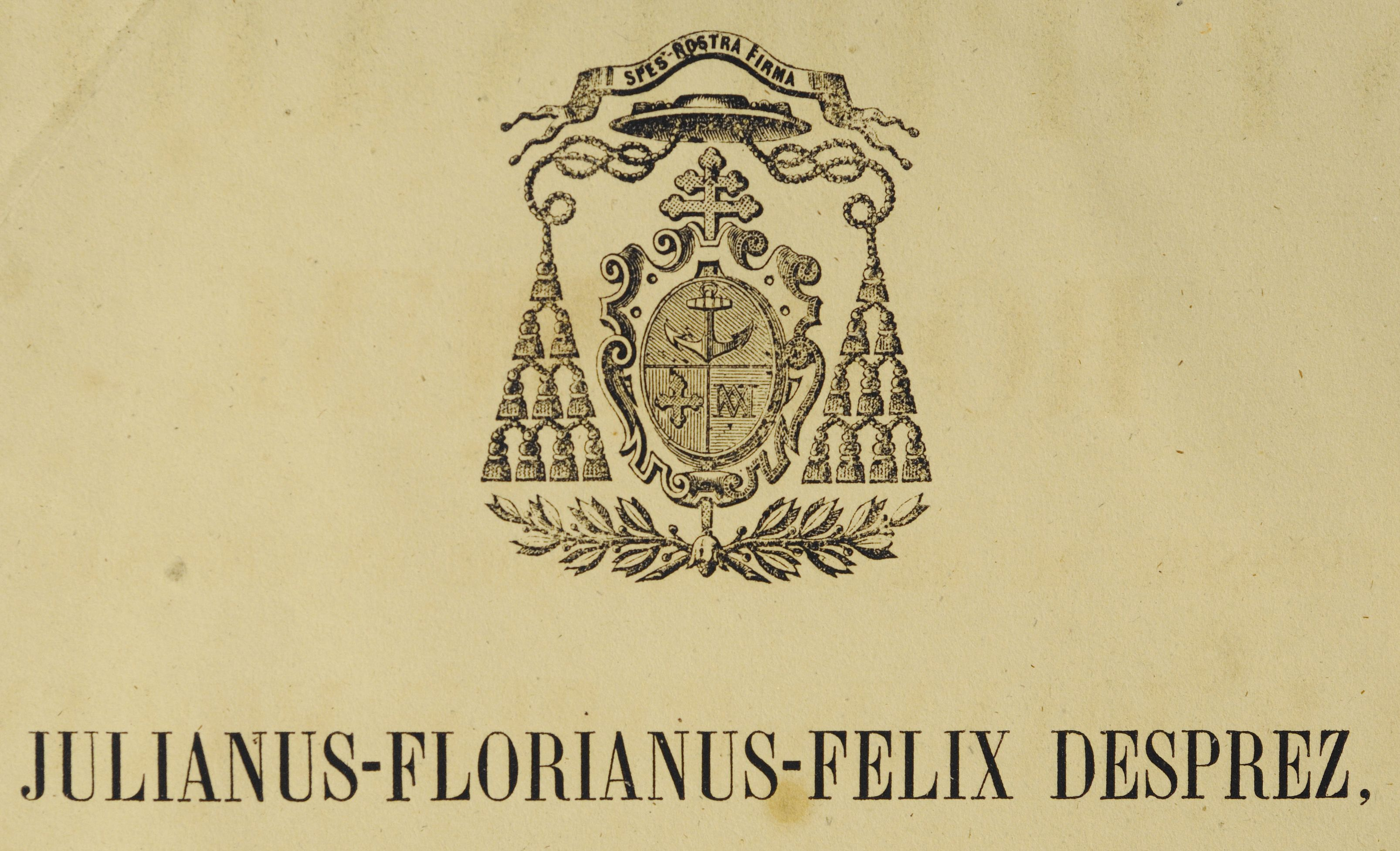
Desprez's coat of arms as an archbishop above his full name in Latin (Note: The image, which appears to be a bookplate, is taken from a book of liturgical music published in 1859. The ten tassels on either side distinguish him as an archbishop.)

After just eighteen months he was promoted to archbishop of Toulouse on 26 September 1859 and installed on 29 November.

In 1861, he completed the plans of his predecessor to use the Roman liturgical rite in Toulouse, part of the long process of suppressing Gallicanism and promoting uniformity of practice. He moved more slowly with respect to doctrine, aligning the diocesan catechism with Roman ideas, including papal infallibility, in 1868. He participated in the First Vatican Council and joined the majority in support of that dogma.

In 1862, Desprez provoked a firestorm of protests by proposing a religious observance to mark the 300th anniversary of events that occurred in Toulouse during the Wars of Religion, when Catholic forces massacred several thousand Huguenots who had been granted safe conduct. He wrote that the Church had a duty to remember "the most remarkable events of its history" and would celebrate "a glorious act" of three hundred years ago. Desprez' announcement described the grand scale of past celebrations, though not Voltaire's protest that the 1762 celebration was held to "thank God for four thousand murders". The Journal des débats reviewed the events of 1562 in detail and called Desprez's planned festival "a deplorable anachronism and a danger to the public peace". It asked: "How is it that [Desprez] has not feared to revive the discords and the hatreds scarcely yet extinct?" The government banned the planned procession. Desprez, in a lengthy letter, presented his intentions in a different light. He said he was completely surprised at the reaction and that the Church would never glorify the violence of past centuries. His position was that the Catholics of Toulouse should celebrate the fact that their prayers had been answered in 1562.

After the French government forbade the publication of Pope Pius IX's Syllabus of Errors condemning modernism, Desprez protested the Church's right to publish it. On 5 January 1865, he asserted the Church's rights calling the document "doctrinal instruction" of which the pope is "the one and only judge". He told the government that it was "abdicating the right to impose moderation by setting no example of it" and "giving joy only ... to the enemies of religion and order". He later described Pius as speaking from a point of view "above the events of this world" and seeing "on the horizon like vapors rising from the abyss the rude and corrupting errors of our time"; he said Pius' work demonstrated the power of the Church, which is "never greater than when it seems most oppressed".

He pressed the case for the canonization of the recently beatified Saint Germaine of Pibrac, a 17th-century shepherd girl abused by her step-mother in a village just west of Toulouse. Pope Pius XI declared her a saint on 29 June 1867 before a vast assembly of clerics who on that day celebrated the 18th centenary of the martyrdom of Saint Peter and the pope congratulated Desprez in person on 1 July.

Following the July 1875 enactment of a statute allowing Catholic higher education, he spearheaded the establishment of the Institut Catholique de Toulouse in 1877. In addition to theological studies, Desprez emphasized its mission in opposition to secularism and contemporary society: "What is the purpose of founding Catholic universities? To provide doctors, lawyers, solicitors, engineers, magistrates, professors, writers, business leaders who will be motivated by Catholic feelings."

Pope Leo XIII made him a cardinal priest on 12 May 1879 and gave him his red galero and the title of Santi Marcellino e Pietro on 22 September 1879. He took possession of his titular church on 25 September 1879.

A doctor who worked in Toulouse during the cholera epidemic of 1885 reported that Desprez was "the only official personage who had the courage at that time to cross the perilous threshold" of the lazaretto. He also reported being told several times that Desprez was the biological son of Emperor Napoleon, though "it was pretty generally agreed that he had not inherited the great intellectual gifts of his supposed father".

He died of heart disease on 21 January 1895 in Toulouse; (Note: The inscription on his tombstone expresses the date of his death using the Roman calends system as "XII KAL FEBRVARII", that is, the eleventh day before 1 February, which is 21 January. This report also errs in transcribing the year of his death as "MDCCCXCX" rather than "MDCCCXCV".) he was the oldest and longest-serving French bishop. His funeral monument in the chapel of Saint Germaine in the cathedral of Toulouse was dedicated on 13 November 1899.

== Honors ==
In 1860, just after his arrival in Toulouse, he was assigned a chair, the same chair occupied by his predecessors since 1821, at the Académie des Jeux Floraux, an organization dedicated to preserving poetic expression according to established norms. (Note: The end of his tenure is unknown, but his chair was assigned to someone else in 1887. The speech Desprez gave on taking his seat on 9 April 1860 is reprinted in Lacointa, pp. 313–16.)

Desprez was made a knight of the Legion of Honor on 31 December 1854 and promoted to officer on 15 August 1868. At the time of his promotion he wrote in a private letter: "It would be better not to add any decoration to my robes." The instructions he left for his funeral declined the military honors associated with his officer's rank.
