= Gilbert Aubry =

Catholic bishop

His Excellency Gilbert Aubry
- Bishop emeritus of Saint-Denis-de-La Réunion
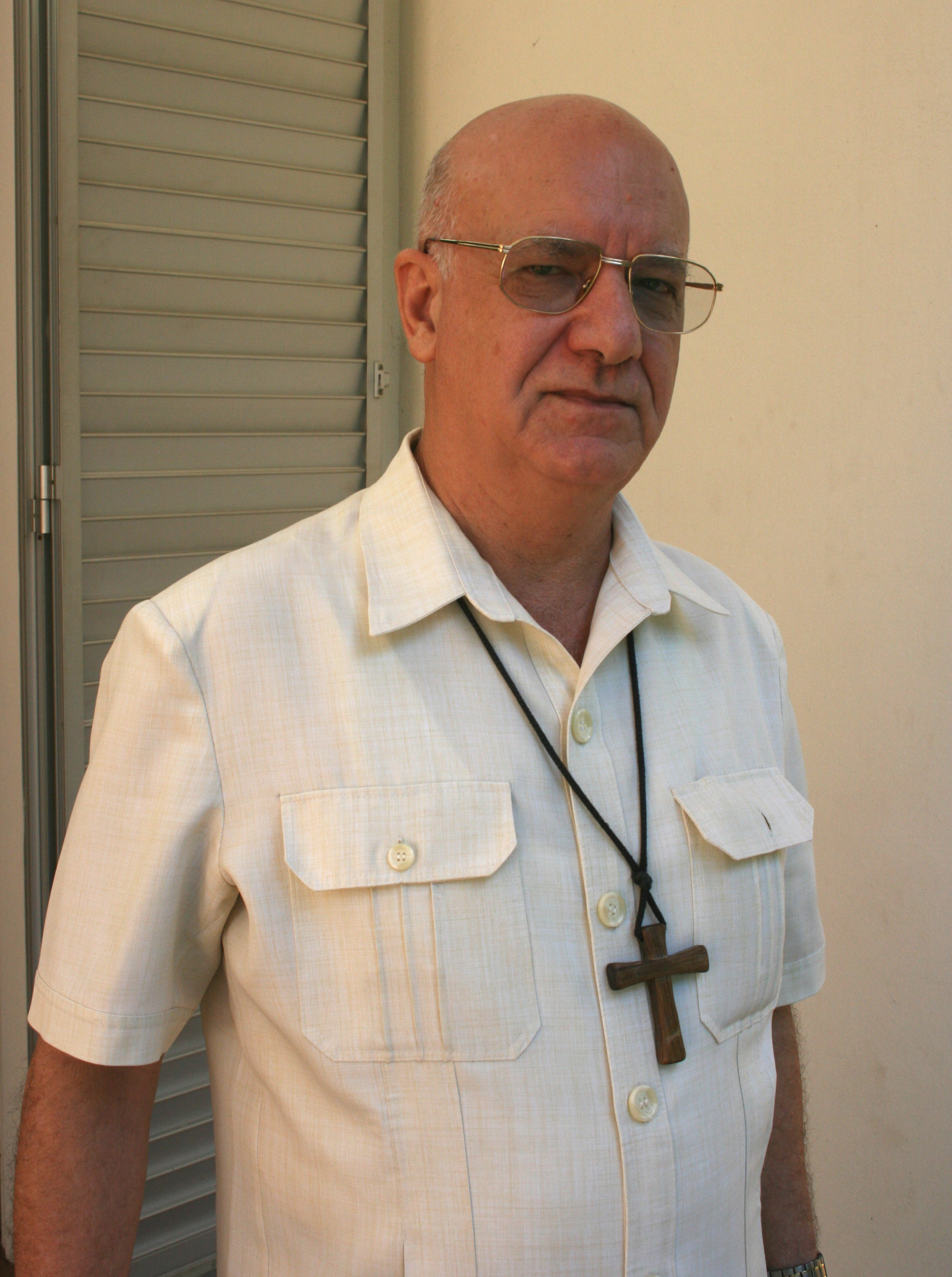
- Church: Roman Catholic Church
- See: Diocese of Saint-Denis-de-La Réunion
- Appointed: 20 November 1975
- Installed: 2 May 1976
- Term ended: 19 July 2023
- Predecessor: Georges-Henri Guibert
- Successor: Pascal David Youri Chane-Teng

Orders
- Ordination: 23 August 1970
- Consecration: 2 May 1976 by Georges-Henri Guibert
- Rank: Bishop

Personal details
- Born: 10 May 1942 (age 84) Saint-Louis, France
- Coat of arms

Gilbert Guillaume Marie-Jean Aubry (born 10 May 1942 in Saint-Louis, Réunion) is a Réunionnais bishop, bishop emeritus of Saint-Denis-de-La Réunion, as well as a poet and a singer. Aubry served as the bishop of the diocese, which is based in the city of Saint-Denis, Réunion, from his episcopal consecration on 2 May 1976 until his retirement on 19 July 2023.

A native of Réunion, Aubry entered the seminary of La Croix-Valmer, before continuing his training at the Pontifical Gregorian University, where he obtained a bachelor's degree in philosophy and another in theology. He was ordained as a Catholic priest on 23 August 1970. before being appointed the bishop of the Roman Catholic Diocese of Saint-Denis-de-La Réunion, just five years later, on 20 November 1975, by Pope Paul VI. His consecration as bishop took place on 2 May 1976, when he was just 34 years old, which made him the youngest French bishop at that time.

His tenure was marked by two cases of pedophilia involving priests from the diocese, during which he testified. He was a member of the Pontifical Commission for the Conservation of the Church's Artistic and Historical Heritage, and also presided over the Episcopal Conference of the Indian Ocean.

Pope Francis accepted his resignation on 19 July 2023

== Books ==
- Rivages d'alizé, published en 1971, enhanced in 1975, re-released en 1980, UDIR.
- Sois peuple - Mystique marronnage, 1982, UDIR.
- Pour Dieu et pour l'Homme... Réunionnais, published in 1988, Océan Éditions.
- Poétique Mascarine, 1989, Éditions caribéennes.
- Cœur brûlant, 2000, Éditions Azalées.
- Lumière sur Rivière Noire, 2010, Éditions Azalées.

== Discography ==
- Créolie : une âme pour mon île, Auvidis, 1979.

== See also ==
- Roman Catholicism in Réunion
