= Saint-Denis Cathedral, Réunion =

Coordinates: 20.8772°S 55.4487°E

Saint-Denis Cathedral
- Cathédrale Saint-Denis de Saint-Denis de La Réunion
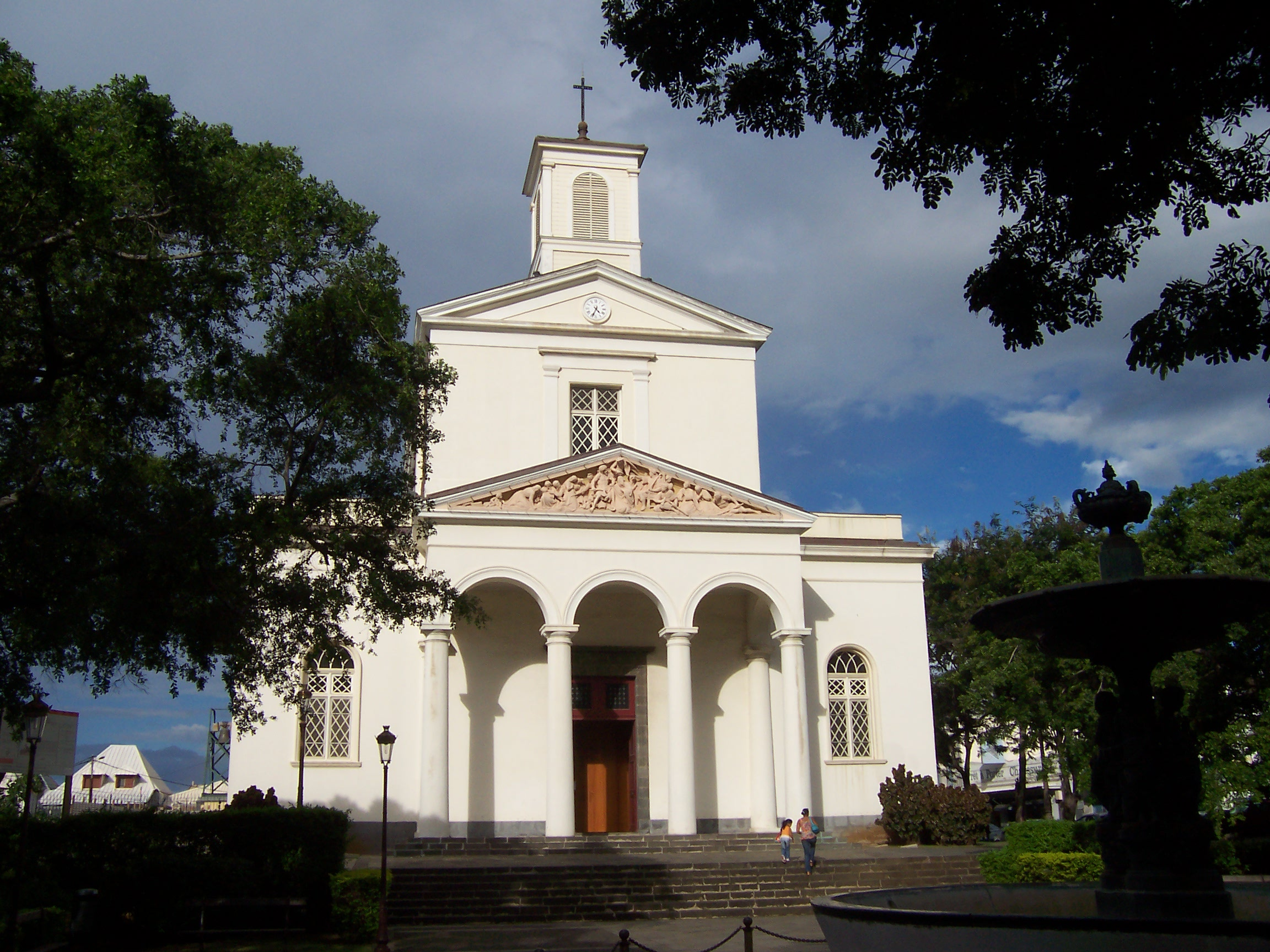
- Saint-Denis Cathedral
- Saint-Denis Cathedral
- Location: Réunion
- Country: France
- Denomination: Roman Catholic Church

History
- Consecrated: 1860

Administration
- Diocese: Diocese of Saint-Denis de La Réunion

Monument historique
- Official name: Cathédrale Saint-Denis de Saint-Denis de La Réunion
- Type: Classé
- Designated: 1972

Saint-Denis Cathedral (French: Cathédrale Saint-Denis de Saint-Denis de La Réunion) or at greater length the Cathedral of St. Denis, Saint-Denis, Réunion, is a Roman Catholic cathedral located in Saint-Denis, capital of the island of Reunion, a province of France in the Indian Ocean, part of Africa. It is dedicated to Saint Denis, after whom the city of Saint-Denis is named, and is the episcopal seat of the Diocese of Saint-Denis-de-La Réunion.

== History ==
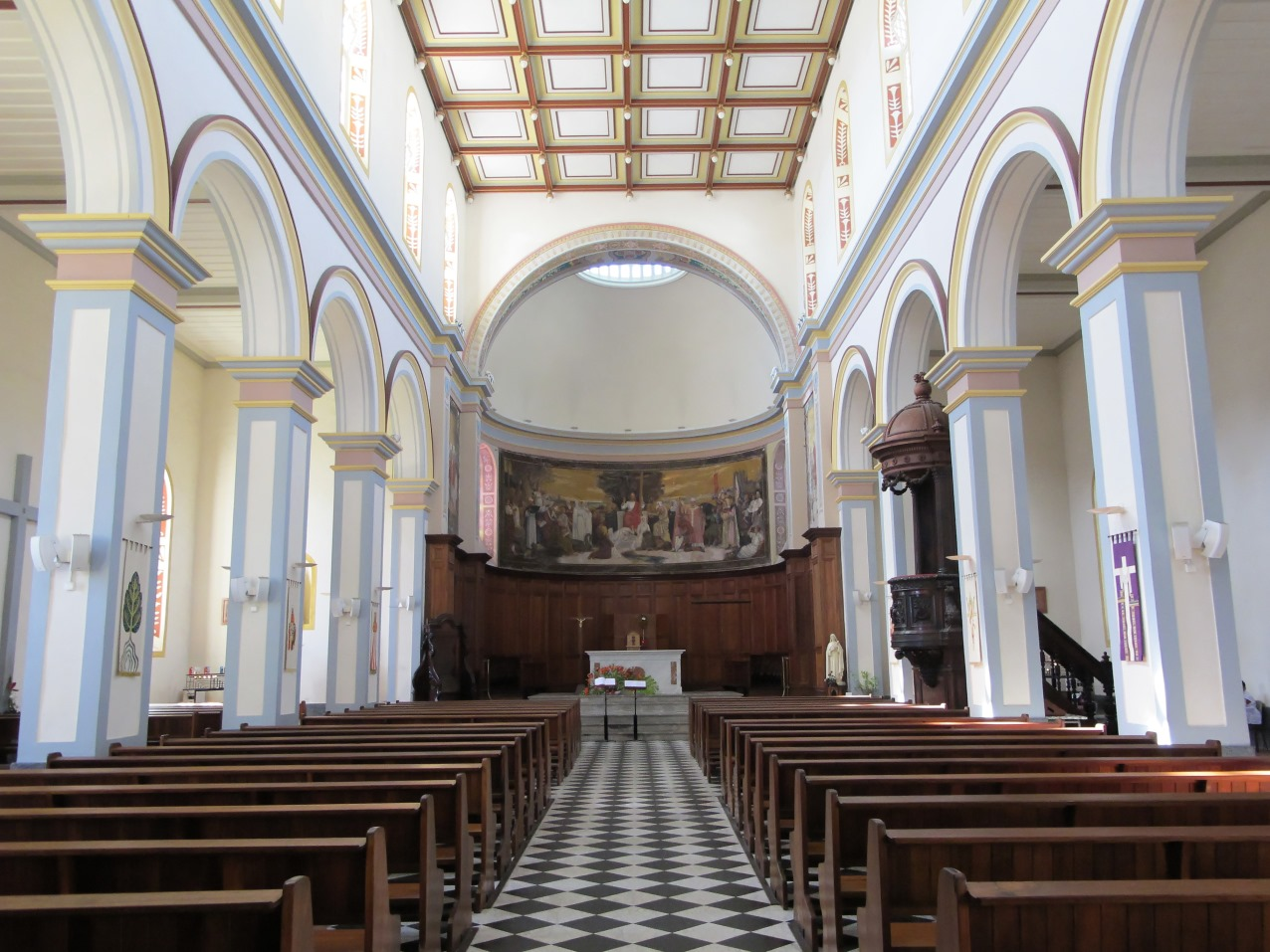
Interior of the church

Constructed according to the plans of an engineer called Paradis on the site of a church that had preceded it in the 18th century, the first foundation stone was laid on 4 November 1829, by the governor of Penfentenyo. Despite being consecrated as a cathedral in 1860 by Monsignor Maupoint, bishop of Saint-Denis de La Réunion, it did not take its final form until 1863 with the construction of the western porch in the prostyle style and the later addition of a bell tower. The whole building was registered as a monument historique on 13 October 1975.

On 25 May 1946, just outside the cathedral, politician Alexis de Villeneuve was shot dead in the middle of a crowd gathered to hear him speak.

== See also ==
- Roman Catholicism in Réunion
- Basilica of St Denis
