= St. Anne's Church, Saint-Benoît =

Coordinates: 21.0802°S 55.7428°E

St. Anne's Church
- Église Sainte-Anne de Saint-Benoît
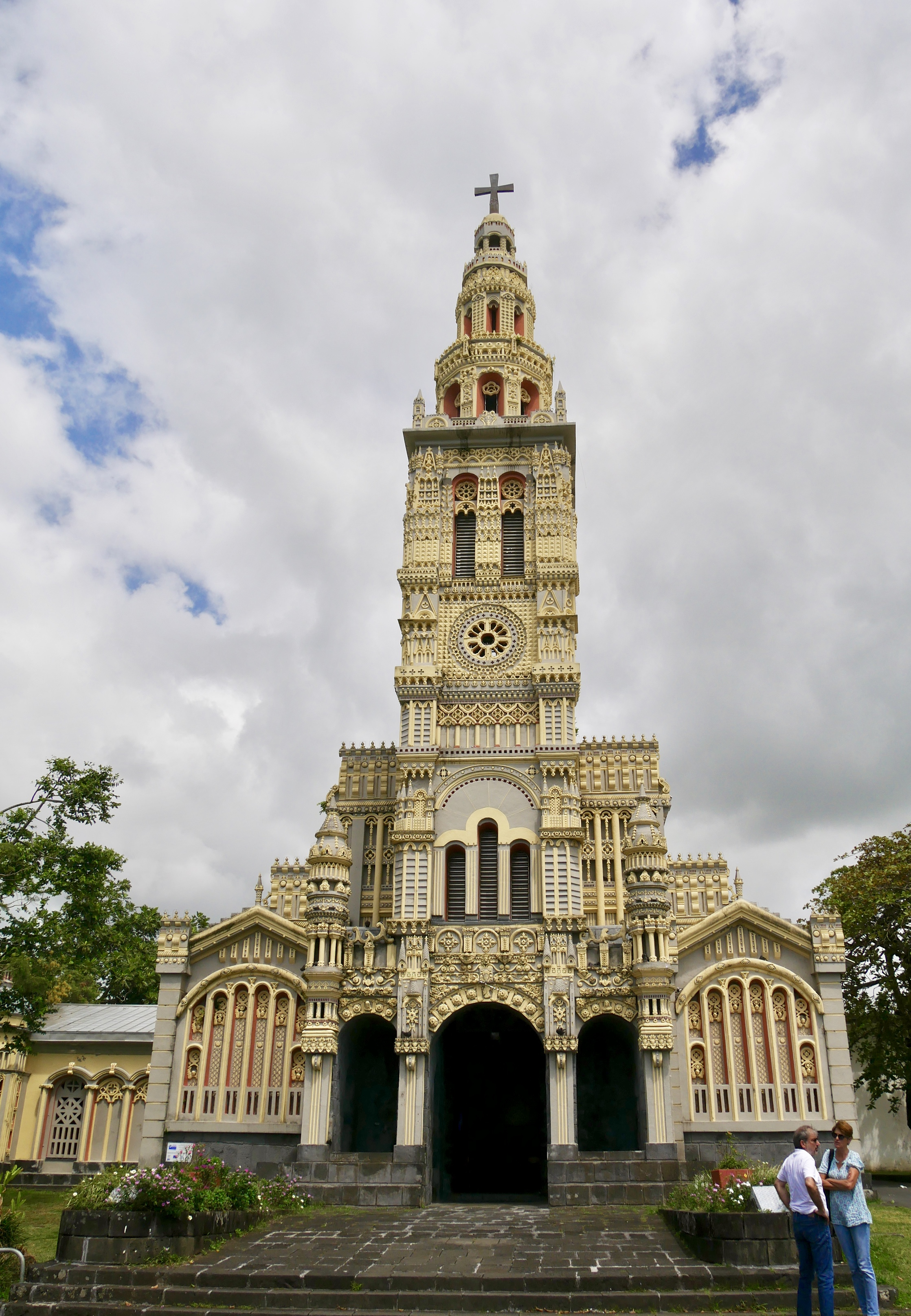
- St. Anne's Church
- Location: Réunion
- Country: France
- Denomination: Roman Catholic Church

St. Anne's Church (French: Église Sainte-Anne de Saint-Benoît) is a Catholic church on the island of Réunion, French overseas department in the Indian Ocean.

Located in the jurisdiction of the city of Saint-Benoît (St. Benedict) and the Roman Catholic Diocese of Saint-Denis de La Réunion, the church is the most notable building in the district of St. Anne (hence its classification as a historical monument). It previously served as the backdrop of François Truffaut's film "La sirène du Mississippi". This church is under special protection due to its classification as a historical monument since October 11, 1982.

== See also ==
- Roman Catholicism in Réunion
- Church of St. Ann
