= Diocese of Saint-Denis de La Réunion =

Latin Catholic diocese in Réunion

Coordinates: 20°52′59″S 55°27′00″E

Diocese of Saint-Denis de La Réunion Dioecesis Sancti Dionysii Reunionis Diocèse de Saint-Denis de La Réunion
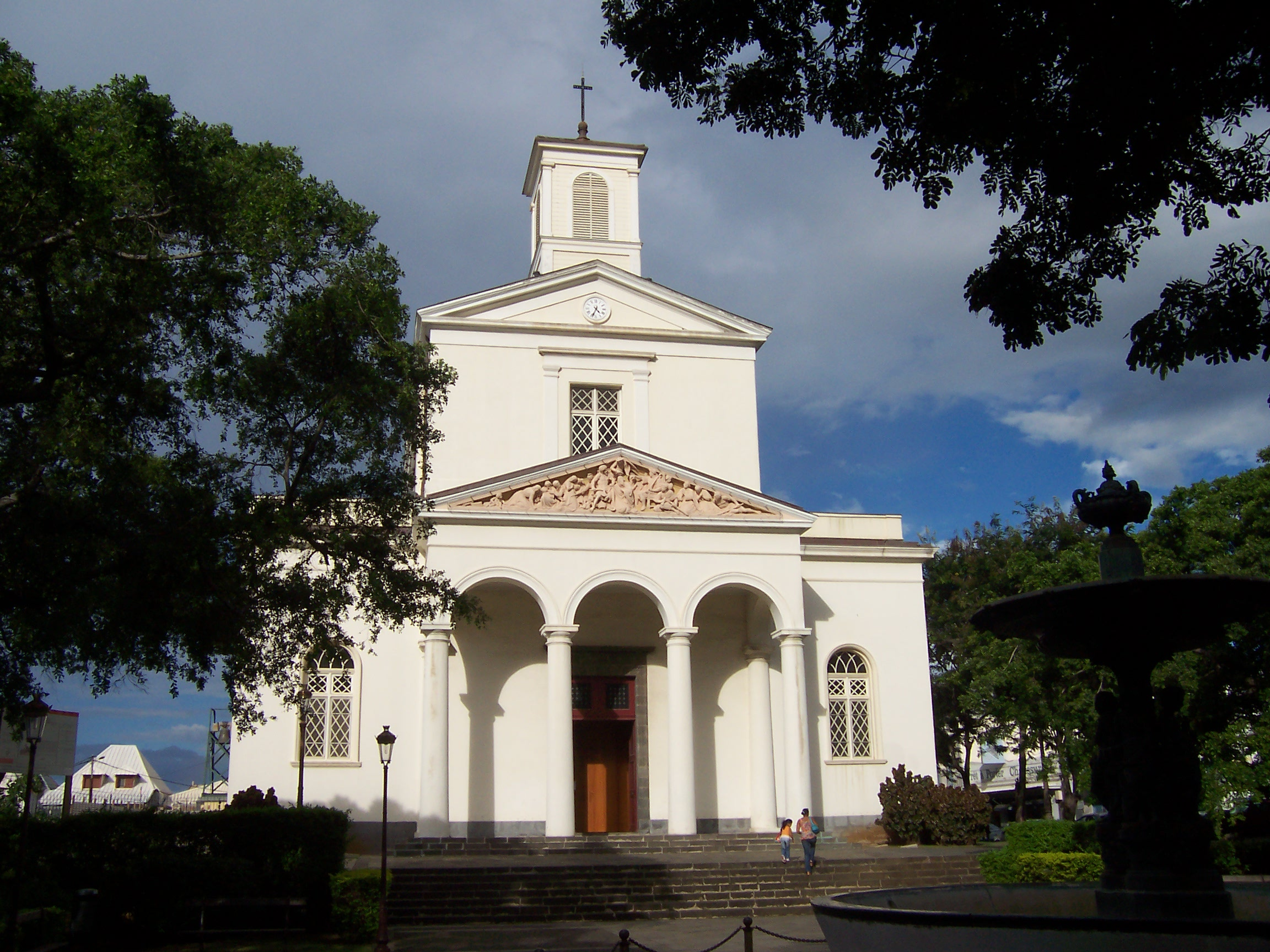
- Cathedral of Saint-Denis

Location
- Country: Réunion, France
- Metropolitan: Immediately Subject to the Holy See

Statistics
- Area: 2,600 km^{2} (1,000 sq mi)
- Population: Total; Catholics: (as of 2010); 806,000; 644,000 (79.9%)

Information
- Denomination: Catholic Church
- Sui iuris church: Latin Church
- Rite: Roman Rite
- Established: 1712 (As Prefecture Apostolic of Islands of the Indian Ocean); 1818 (As Prefecture Apostolic of Bourbon); 27 September 1850 (As Diocese of Saint-Denis-de-La Réunion)
- Cathedral: Cathedral of Saint Denis in Saint-Denis, Réunion

Current leadership
- Pope: Leo XIV
- Bishop: Pascal Chane-Teng
- Bishops emeritus: Gilbert Aubry

Website
- http://www.eglisealareunion.org/

The Diocese of Saint-Denis de La Réunion (Latin: Dioecesis Sancti Dionysii Reunionis; French: Diocèse de Saint-Denis de La Réunion) is a Latin Church ecclesiastical jurisdiction or diocese of the Catholic Church located on the island of Réunion. It is immediately subject to the Holy See. As such, it is not part of an ecclesiastical province, but is a member of the Episcopal Conference of the Indian Ocean (with Comoros, Mauritius and Seychelles). The cathedral church of the diocese is the Cathedral of Saint-Denis (French: Cathédrale de Saint-Denis de La Réunion) located in Saint-Denis.

== History ==
- Established 1712 as the Apostolic Prefecture of Islands of the Indian Ocean, on territory split off from the Diocese of Malacca (in Malaysia)
- On 8 May 1807, it lost Asian territory to the Apostolic Prefecture of Batavia, now the Archdiocese of Jakarta.
- In 1818, it was renamed the Apostolic Prefecture of Bourbon, after the island's then colonial name.
- On 10 January 1830, it lost Oceanian territory to the Apostolic Prefecture of South Seas Islands (New Zealand).
- In 1841, it lost Indian Ocean territory to the Apostolic Prefecture of Madagascar.
- In 1850, it was promoted and renamed the Diocese of Saint-Denis de La Réunion.
- On 26 February 1860, it lost East African territory to the Apostolic Prefecture of Zanguebar, now the Diocese of Zanzibar).

== Ordinaries ==
Apostolic Prefect of Bourbon

- Gabriel-Henri-Jérôme de Solages (1829 – 1832.12.08), later first Apostolic Prefect of daughter jurisdiction South Seas Islands (New Zealand) (1830 – 1832.12.08)

Exempt Bishops of Saint-Denis-de-La Réunion

- Florian Desprez (1850.06.22 – 1857.03.19), later Bishop of Limoges (France) ([1857.02.04] 1857.03.19 – 1859.09.26), Metropolitan Archbishop of Toulouse (France) ([1859.07.30] 1859.09.26 – death 1895.01.21), created Cardinal-Priest of Ss. Marcellino e Pietro (1879.09.22 – 1895.01.21)
- Armand-René Maupoint (1857.02.14 – 1871.07.10), later Apostolic Prefect of daughter jurisdiction Zanguebar (Zanzibar island, now in Tanzania) (1862 – death 1871.07.10)
- Victor-Jean-François-Paulin Delannoy (1872.02.10 – 1876.12.18), later Bishop of Aire et Dax (France) ([1876.10.10] 1876.12.18 – death 1905.08.07)
- Dominique-Clément-Marie Soulé (1876.10.10 – 1880.11.30), later Apostolic Administrator of Guadeloupe et Basse-Terre diocese (Guadeloupe) (1892.11.21 – 1898), emeritate as Titular Archbishop of Leontopolis in Bithynia (1893.03.21 – 1919.04.21)
- Joseph Coldefy (1881.02.17 – death 1887.01.18)
- Edmond-Frédéric Fuzet (1887.10.12 – 1893.01.19), later Bishop of Beauvais (Picardy, France) ([1892.11.26] 1893.01.19 – 1899.12.07), Metropolitan Archbishop of Rouen (Normandy, France) (1899.12.07 – death 1915.12.20)
- Jacques-Paul-Antonin Fabre (1892.11.26 – death 1919.12.26)
- Georges-Marie de Labonninière de Beaumont, C.S.Sp. (1919.12.26 - death 1934.07.23)
- François-Emile-Marie Cléret de Langavant, Holy Ghost Fathers (C.S.Sp.) (1934.12.10 – 1960.10.21), later Titular Bishop of Mactaris (1960.10.21 – 1971.07.21)
- Georges-Henri Guibert, C.S.Sp. (1960.11.07 – retired 1975.02.19), previously Titular Bishop of Dices (1949.12.15 – 1960.11.07) & Auxiliary Bishop of Dakar (Senegal) (1949.12.15 – 1960.11.07)
- Gilbert Guillaume Marie-Jean Aubry (since 1975.11.20 – retired 2023.07.19), also President of Episcopal Conferences of Indian Ocean (1989–1996), Apostolic Administrator of neighbouring Indian Ocean diocese Port Victoria (Seychelles) (1994 – 1995.03.03), President of Episcopal Conferences of Indian Ocean (2002–2006)
- Pascal David Youri Chane-Teng (since 2023.07.19 - )

=== Coadjutor Bishop ===
- Georges-Marie de Labonninière de Beaumont, C.S.Sp. (1917–1919)

== Churches ==
Diocese of Saint-Denis de La Réunion Churches
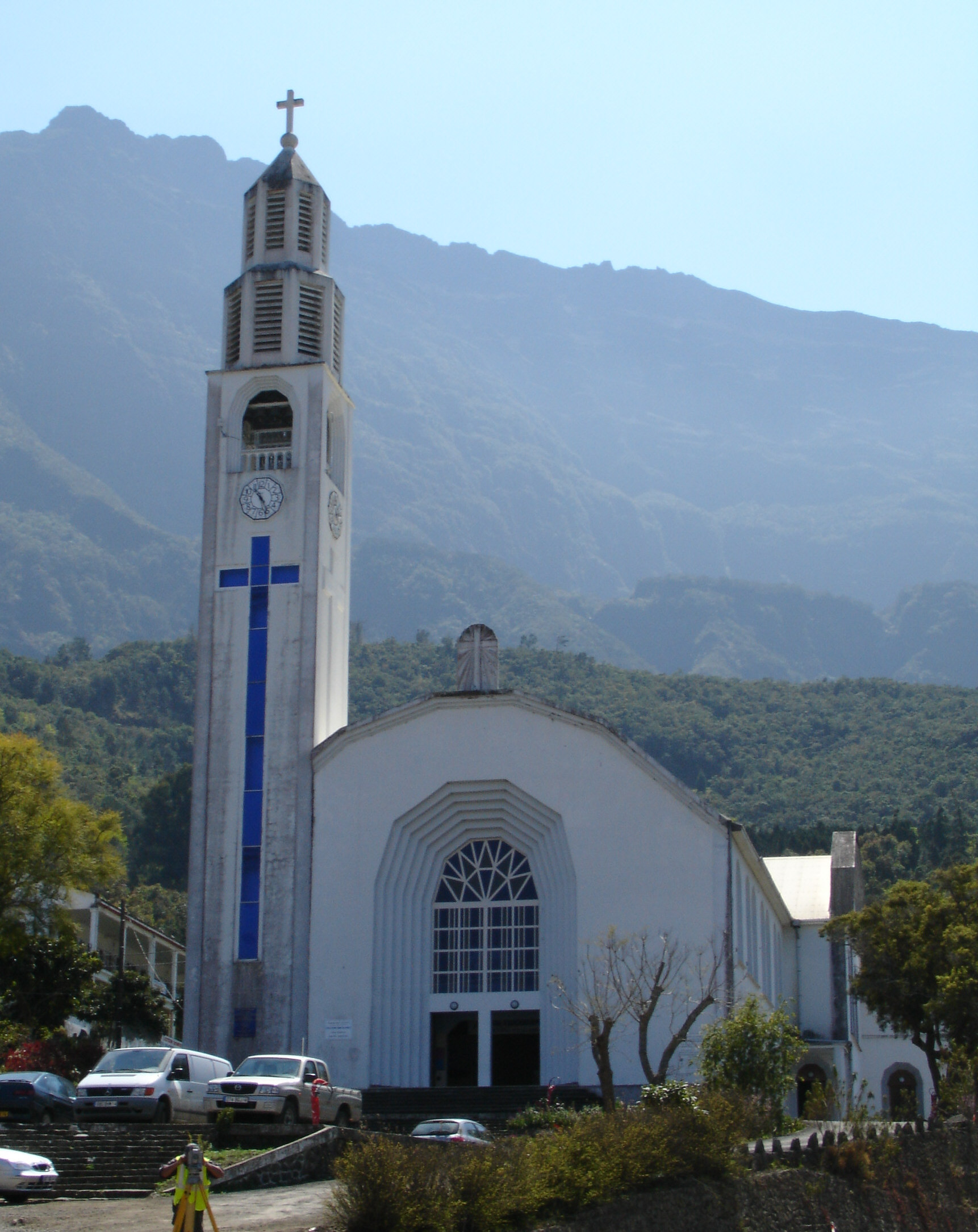
Notre-Dame-des-Neiges in Cilaos

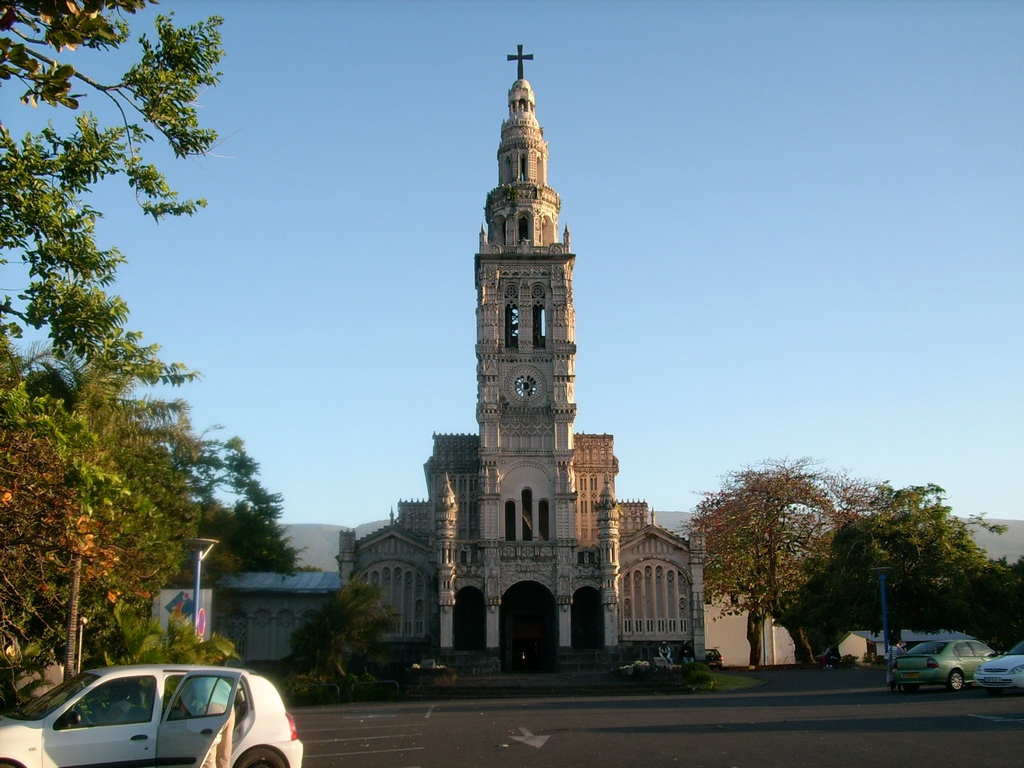
St. Anne's Church in Saint-Benoît

== See also ==
- List of saints from Africa
