= Georges Guibert =

French Roman Catholic missionary

Georges Guibert C.S.SP.
- Bishop of Saint-Denis-de-La Réunion
- Church: Catholic Church
- Diocese: Diocese of Saint-Denis de La Réunion
- In office: 7 November 1960 – 19 February 1975
- Predecessor: François Cléret de Langavant
- Successor: Gilbert Aubry
- Previous posts: Titular Bishop of Dices (1949-1960); Auxiliary Bishop for Dakar (1949-1960)

Orders
- Ordination: 10 August 1941 by Louis Le Hunsec
- Consecration: 19 February 1950 by Marcel Lefebvre

Personal details
- Born: 5 September 1915 Paris, France
- Died: 30 September 1997 (aged 82) Paris, France

Georges Guibert (1915 – 1997) was a French Roman Catholic missionary in Senegal and Réunion. He was consecrated a bishop by Archbishop Marcel Lefebvre.
