= Apostolic Prefecture of South Seas Islands =

The Apostolic Prefecture of South Seas Islands (or of the Islands of the Great Ocean or of Oceania) was a short-lived (1830–1836) Latin Catholic missionary pre-diocesan jurisdiction in the South Seas (now mainly New Zealand).

It was exempt, i.e. directly dependent on the Holy See, not part of any ecclesiastical province.

== History ==
- On 10 January 1830, it was established as Apostolic Prefecture of South Seas Islands, on territory split off from the then Apostolic Prefecture of Bourbon (now diocese of Réunion)
- On 8 June 1833, it lost vast territory to establish the Apostolic Vicariate of Eastern Oceania
- On 10 January 1836 it was suppressed, its huge remaining territory being reassigned to establish the Apostolic Vicariate of Western Oceania.

== Ordinaries ==
(incomplete?; Latin Rite)

- Gabriel-Henri-Jérôme de Solages (1830 – death 1832.12.08), previously Apostolic Prefect of mother jurisdiction Bourbon (Réunion) (1829 – 1832.12.08)
- ?vacancy ?

== Source and External links ==
=== External links ===
- GigaCatholic
