= Patinodrome =

Arena for inline speed skating

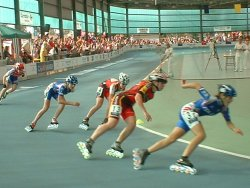
Inline skaters at a patinodrome.

A patinodrome is an arena for inline speed skating. They are oval tracks similar to velodromes used for track cycling, but have flat straights and shallow-banked or no banked curves. They are typically outdoors or under cover with open or partial walls. Patinodromes are common in Europe, but rare in North America.

== Design ==
A patinodrome is generally about 160m to 250m in circumference and may be surfaced with asphalt, concrete or similar material. The curves may be banked.

== List of patinodromes ==
=== UK ===
- Tatem Park

=== Quebec ===
- Sainte-Foy/Quebec, PQ Patinodrome - 418-653-6363

=== France ===
- Saint-Brieuc-Brezillet (22000)
- Gujan-Mestras (33470)
- Pibrac (31820)
- Valence (82400)

=== Argentina ===
- Patinódromo Municipal
