= Athens-to-Atlanta Road Skate =

The Athens to Atlanta Road Skate, also called the A2A, is America’s oldest road skating event. Held each October since 1982, the race consists of three different distances: the full 87 miles, the half 38 miles and the double marathon 52 miles. The main course passes through North Georgia’s countryside and goes into downtown Atlanta, Georgia, finishing in Historic Fourth Ward Skate Park, and in years past previously finishing in Piedmont Park.

== Race information and breakdown ==
Among road skaters, the A2A is considered an important test of endurance and stamina. Participants come from as far away as Germany and Italy.

=== 87, 52 and 38 mile distances ===
Both the 87, or full, and 38, or half, mile distances start in Athens, Georgia, and wind through rural north Georgia. At the 38-mile station, those competing in the 38-mile distance, board a free bus to be taken either back to Athens or to the 87-mile finish line in downtown Atlanta at Piedmont Park.

The 52-mile distance, or double marathon, starts in Dacula, Georgia, and merges with the 87-mile course just after the third checkpoint and ends in Piedmont Park.

== Race records ==
Source: A2A official website

=== Full distance ===
Men - Benoit Perthuis, age 26, in 2000 finished with time 4:19:24
Women – Martine Charbonneau, age 29, in 2007 finished with time 4:41:40

=== Double marathon ===
Men – Jonathan Gorman, age 16, in 2003 finished with time 2:49:31
Women – Melissa Escobar, age 18, in 2006 finished with time 3:19:01

=== Half distance ===
Men – Jonathan Gorman, age 15, in 2002 finished with time 1:56:56
Women – Debbie Rice, age 32, in 2000 finished with time 2:07:57
