= Goodwood Roller Marathon =

UK charity race

Coordinates: 50°51′34″N 0°45′33″W

- Goodwood Roller Marathon
- Date: August
- Location: Goodwood Motor Circuit, Chichester, United Kingdom
- Event type: Roller Skate
- Distance: 4.8miles, 12.1miles, 26.6miles (Marathon) & 53.2miles (Double Marathon)
- Established: 2001
- Website: www.goodwoodmarathon.co.uk

Goodwood Roller Marathon was an annual charity race around the historic Goodwood Motor Circuit organised by the Camberley Skaters. The event officially raised money for the NSPCC and Young Epilepsy (formerly the NCYPE) with many participants also raising money for many other charities. The race was for any "non powered, small wheeled transport" such as Roller Skates (Inline & Quad), Longboards or Roller Skis.

== Event ==
There have been five different lengths of race open to all age groups; although no more than four have run in any one year:

Name	# Laps	Miles	Kilometres
Mini	2	4.84	7.74
Midi	5	12.10	19.47
Full	11	26.62	42.84
Dual	22	53.24	85.68
Mega	26	62.14	100.0

== History ==
=== Previous Years (2001–2005) ===
The event was started in 2001 by Barry Bridger of the Reigate and Redhill Roller Skating Club as the British Roller Skating Grand Prix and raised money for Young Epilepsy (formerly the NCYPE) and NSPCC. Barry picked Goodwood Motor Circuit as a location and found that 11 laps of the 2.42-mile circuit made a perfect marathon distance. Dates of the races were:

- 22 July 2001
- 26 May 2002
- 15 June 2003
- 13 June 2004
- 12 June 2005

=== 2006 ===
In 2006 the event was taken over by the Camberley Skaters and renamed the Goodwood Roller Marathon. The event took place on 30 July 2006 and raised £2141.48 for Young Epilepsy (formerly the NCYPE) of which the charity should be able to claim GiftAid on every penny which brings the total up to £2741.09.

=== 2007 ===
Taking place on 29 July 2007, the Goodwood Roller Marathon 2007 saw the addition of two new races, the Midi and the Mini at five and two laps respectively. With even more people doing the full marathon than the year before, and an extra 30% did the two smaller races, with even more money being raised for the NSPCC.

In total Goodwood Roller Marathon 2007 successfully raised £3,496.50 for the NSPCC. Due to sponsorship forms, the NSPCC should be able to claim Gift Aid on every penny, including this and other charities makes a grand total of £5,008.30 raised for charity.

=== 2008 ===
Taking place on 10 August 2008, the Goodwood Roller Marathon 2008 saw the addition of the Mega race at 26 laps (100 km), with almost double the number of racers as the year before and even more money being raised for the NSPCC.

In total, Goodwood Roller Marathon 2008 successfully raised £9,328.97 for the NSPCC. Due to sponsorship forms, the NSPCC should be able to claim Gift Aid on every penny, including this and other charities makes a grand total of £13,287.64 raised for charity.

=== 2009 ===
Taking place on 9 August 2009, the Mega race was dropped for the Dual race at 22 laps, 53.24 miles or 85.68 km, effectively a double marathon. With at least 70% of the participants being new to the race, a total of 560 entrants were signed up for the Mini, Midi, Full and Dual events.

Total monies raised during the event were
Total for the NSPCC: £11,180.00
Total raised for other charities: £1,602.65
Grand total for all charities and Gift Aid: £16,361.79

=== 2010 ===
Goodwood Roller Marathon 2010 took place on 8 August with a total of 796 entrants signed up for the event. The format from last year was kept with the Dual, the Full Marathon, the Midi and the Mini. A new two-hour wheelchair race, which started three hours after the main event, was introduced at the suggestion of the West Coast Tornados Wheelchair Basketball Club.

Total monies raised this year was
Total for the NSPCC: £14,595.72
Total raised for other charities: £9,683.20
Grand total for all charities and Gift Aid: £31,077.02

=== 2011 ===
Goodwood Roller Marathon 2011 took place on 14 August 2011 with 1298 people registering prior to the event. The format stayed the same as the previous three years (Mini, Midi, Full and Dual) and the wheelchair race (7 participants) starting at 2 pm.

Total monies raised this year was
Total for the NSPCC
£22,904.21
Total raised for other charities
£45,315.24
Grand Total for all charities and Gift Aid
£77,531.09

=== Post Years (2012-2017) ===
In 2012 the Camberley Skaters decided to hang up their skates after six years. The event was put on pause in December 2011 and never returned.

The event slot was taken over by the South Coast Roll who held a skating race at the track in following years (2012-2017) but moved the event to Castle Combe Circuit in Wiltshire from 2018.

== See also ==
- Roller skating
- Marathon
- Exercise
