= Hockey stop =

Primary way of stopping on ice skates in ice hockey

A hockey stop is a specific and primary way of stopping on ice skates while playing ice hockey. The hockey stop allows the skater to change directions quickly, keeping up with play. It takes practice to effectively stop facing both ways, most skaters are stronger stopping one direction over another (i.e. stop right as opposed to left).

To hockey stop, once the skater has assumed some speed, they, while always in the hockey position, will rapidly pivot their hips 90 degrees. The pivot turns the skates, and the skater is using both skates to stop.

The outside skate uses the inside edge to stop while the inside skate uses the outside edge. Edges on both skates are used to stop. Sometimes skaters like to use just the inside edge of their outside skate. While they are still stopping, it takes longer and more energy as well as wears out the edges faster.

As with the hockey position, the legs in a hockey stop will be about shoulder width apart, and shoulders parallel to the ice for best balance distribution.
