= Artistic roller skating at the 2001 World Games – Men's singles =

Artistic roller skating - men's singles at the World Games
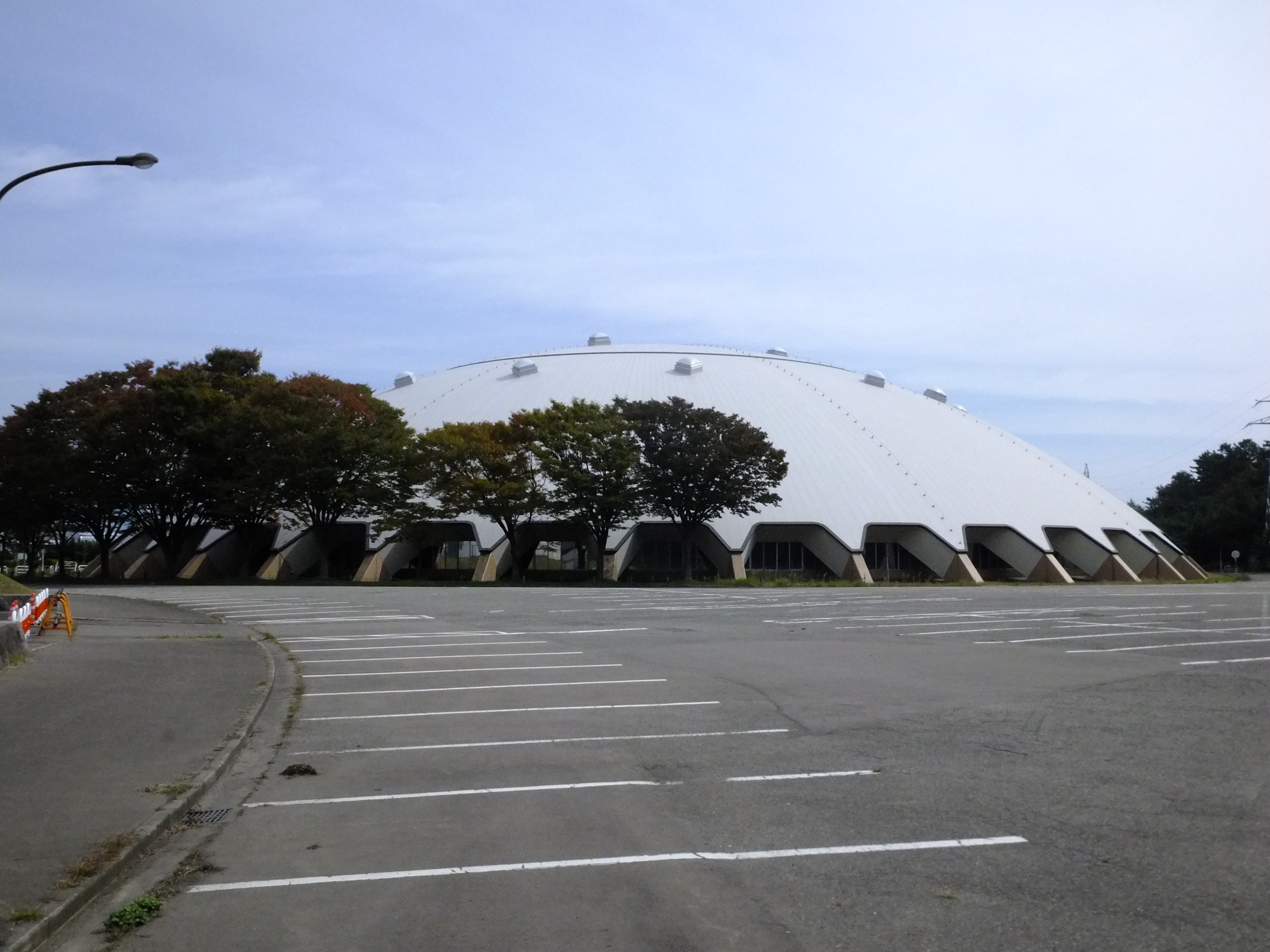
- Akita Prefectural Skating Rink
- Venue: Akita Prefectural Skating Rink, Akita, Japan
- Date: 22–23 August 2001
- Competitors: 5 from 5 nations

Medalists
1st place, gold medalist(s)		Luca Lailai	Italy
2nd place, silver medalist(s)		Joshua Rhodes	United States
3rd place, bronze medalist(s)		Daniel Arriola	Argentina

The men's singles competition in artistic roller skating at the 2001 World Games in Akita was played from 22 to 23 August. The skating competition took place at Akita Prefectural Skating Rink.

== Competition format ==
A total of 5 athletes entered the competition. Short programme and long programme were held.

== Results ==
Rank	Athlete	Nation
1st place, gold medalist(s)	Luca Lailai	Italy
2nd place, silver medalist(s)	Joshua Rhodes	United States
3rd place, bronze medalist(s)	Daniel Arriola	Argentina
4	Diego Dores	Brazil
5	Takayuki Matsumoto	Japan
