= Artistic roller skating at the 2001 World Games – Women's singles =

Artistic roller skating - women's singles at the World Games
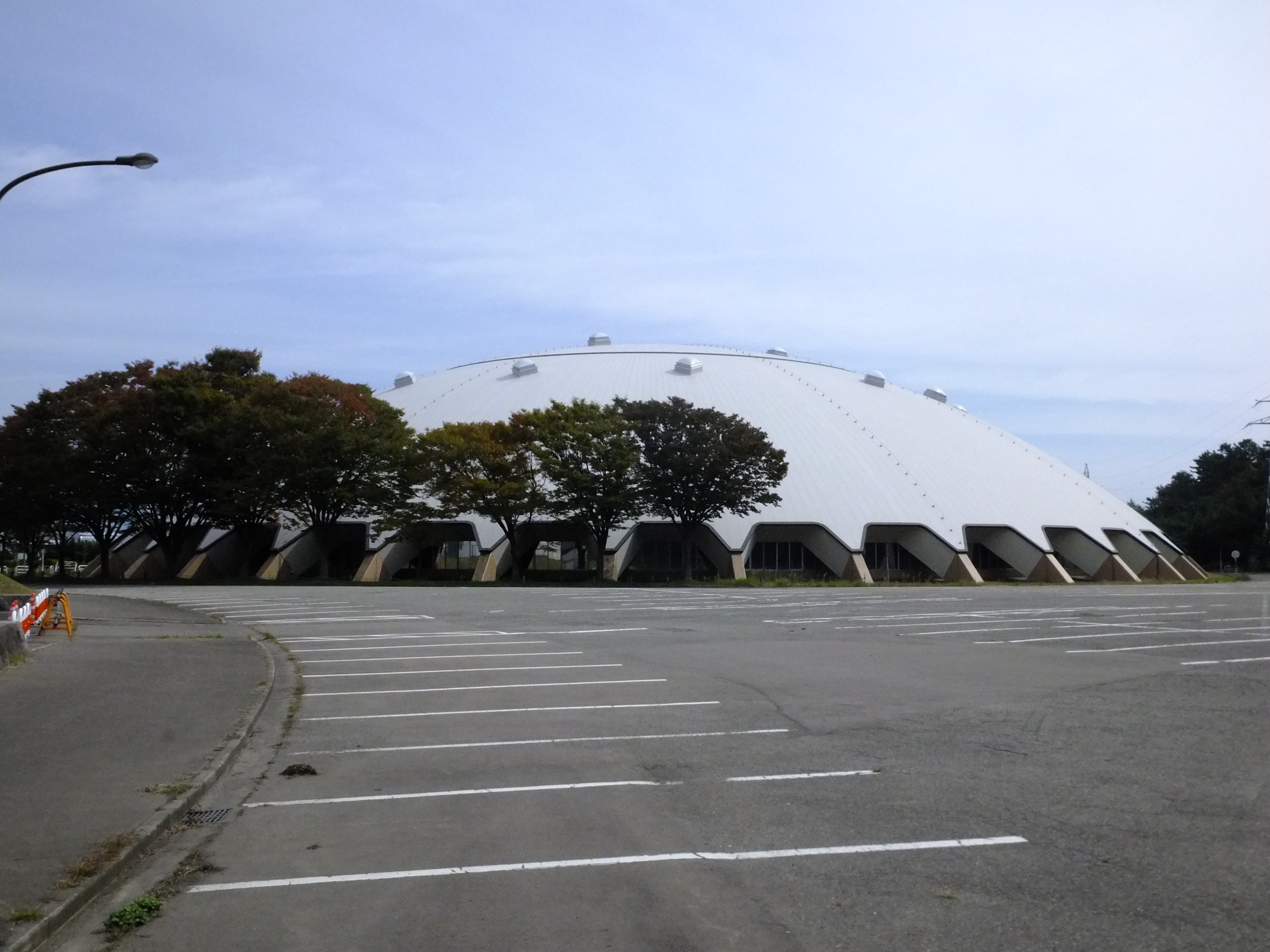
- Akita Prefectural Skating Rink
- Venue: Akita Prefectural Skating Rink, Akita, Japan
- Date: 22–23 August 2001
- Competitors: 6 from 6 nations

Medalists
1st place, gold medalist(s)		Heather Mulkey	United States
2nd place, silver medalist(s)		Erica Colaceci	Italy
3rd place, bronze medalist(s)		Elke Dederichs	Germany

The women's singles competition in artistic roller skating at the 2001 World Games in Akita was played from 22 to 23 August. The skating competition took place at Akita Prefectural Skating Rink.

== Competition format ==
A total of 6 athletes entered the competition. Short programme and long programme were held.

== Results ==
Rank	Athlete	Nation
1st place, gold medalist(s)	Heather Mulkey	United States
2nd place, silver medalist(s)	Erica Colaceci	Italy
3rd place, bronze medalist(s)	Elke Dederichs	Germany
4	Daniela Rodas	Argentina
5	Angelica Diaz	Colombia
6	Rieko Iwakata	Japan
