= Inline speed skating at the 2001 World Games – Men's 20,000 m elimination race =

Inline speed skating – men's 20,000 m elimination at the 2001 World Games
- Venue: Akita Prefectural Skating Rink, Akita, Japan
- Date: 26 August 2001
- Competitors: 23 from 9 nations

Medalists
gold medal	(New Zealand) Kalon Dobbin
silver medal	(Colombia) Jorge Botero
bronze medal	(Germany) Christoph Zschätzsch

The men's 20,000 m elimination race in inline speed skating at the 2001 World Games took place on 26 August 2001 at the Akita Prefectural Skating Rink in Akita, Japan.

== Competition format ==
A total of 23 athletes entered the competition. From the best five athletes, who weren't be eliminated the fastest is a winner.

== Results ==
Rank	Athlete	Nation	Time
1st place, gold medalist(s)	Kalon Dobbin	New Zealand	32:46.86
2nd place, silver medalist(s)	Jorge Botero	Colombia	32:46.88
3rd place, bronze medalist(s)	Christoph Zschätzsch	Germany	32:47.03
4	Fabian Arcila	Venezuela	32:47.13
5	Nico Wieduwilt	Germany	32:48.50
6	Shane Dobbin	New Zealand	REL
7	Diego Rosero	Colombia	REL
8	Chen Wei-ming	Chinese Taipei	REL
9	Nick Tom	New Zealand	REL
10	Alain Gloor	Switzerland	REL
11	Su Jen-ping	Chinese Taipei	REL
12	Benjamin Zschätzsch	Germany	REL
13	Oscar Rivas	Venezuela	REL
14	Lo Hsuan-che	Chinese Taipei	REL
15	Sota Kazamaki	Japan	REL
16	Liu Yu-shen	Chinese Taipei	REL
17	Derek Downing	United States	REL
18	Miguel Rueda	Colombia	REL
19	Daisuke Kazamaki	Japan	REL
20	Masatoshi Takahagi	Japan	REL
	Daniel Zschätzsch	Germany	DNS
	Gregory Duggento	Italy	DNS
	Chad Hedrick	United States	DNS
