= Artistic roller skating at the 2001 World Games – Pairs =

Artistic roller skating at the 2001 World Games in Akita

Artistic roller skating - pairs at the World Games
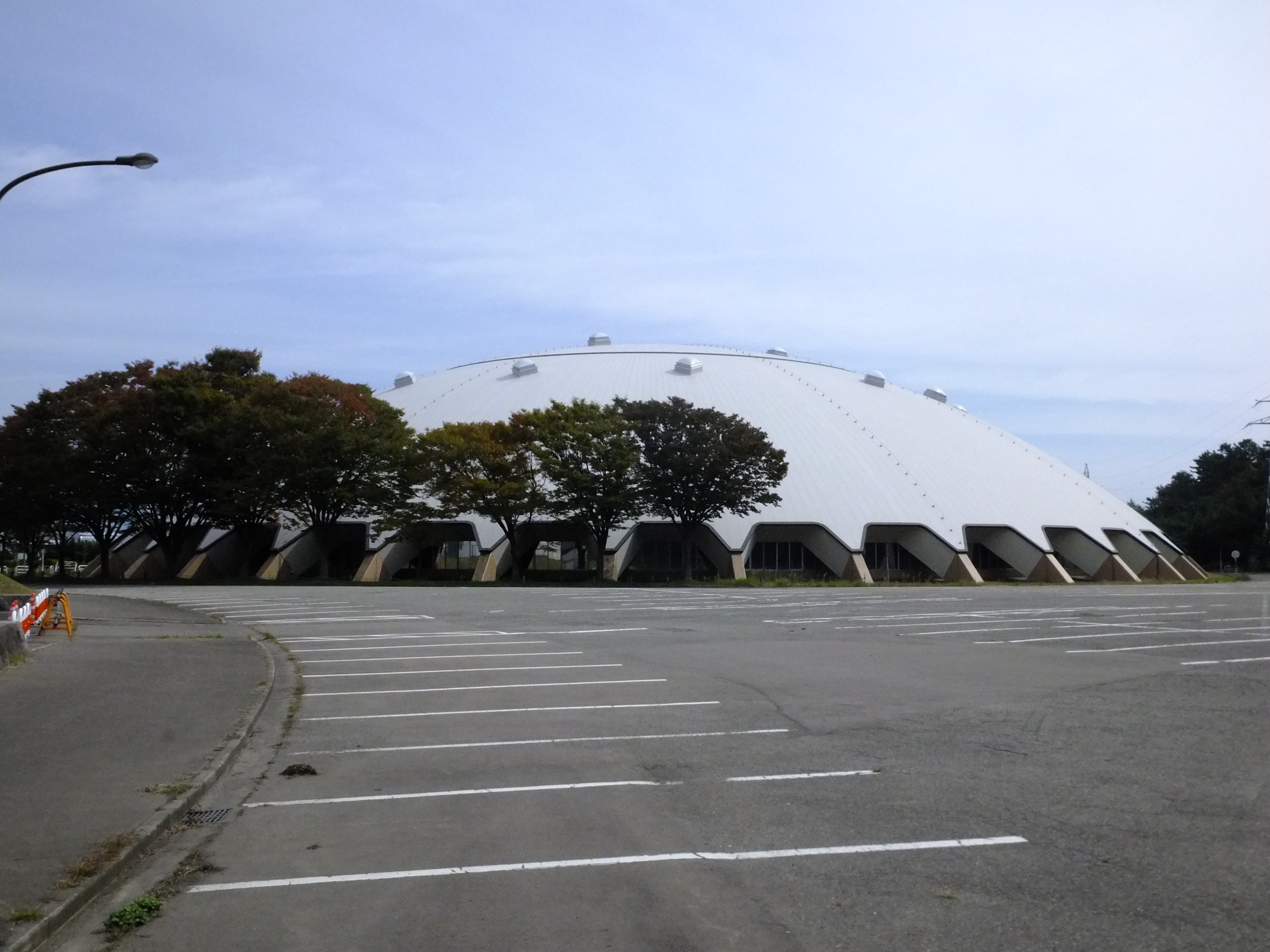
- Akita Prefectural Skating Rink
- Venue: Akita Prefectural Skating Rink, Akita, Japan
- Date: 22-23 August 2001
- Competitors: 8 from 4 nations

Medalists
1st place, gold medalist(s)		Patrick Venerucci; Beatrice Palazzi Rossi	Italy
2nd place, silver medalist(s)		Billy Crowder; Candice Heiden	United States
3rd place, bronze medalist(s)		Max Santos; Luciana Roiha	Brazil

The pairs event in artistic roller skating at the 2001 World Games in Akita was played from 22 to 23 August. The skating competition took place at Akita Prefectural Skating Rink.

== Competition format ==
A total of 4 pairs entered the competition. Short programme and long programme were held.

== Results ==
Rank	Athlete	Nation
1st place, gold medalist(s)	Patrick Venerucci; Beatrice Palazzi Rossi	Italy
2nd place, silver medalist(s)	Billy Crowder; Candice Heiden	United States
3rd place, bronze medalist(s)	Max Santos; Luciana Roiha	Brazil
4	Weng Tzu-hsia; Huang Chiau-hui	Chinese Taipei
