= Artistic roller skating at the 2001 World Games – Dance =

Artistic roller skating - dance at the World Games
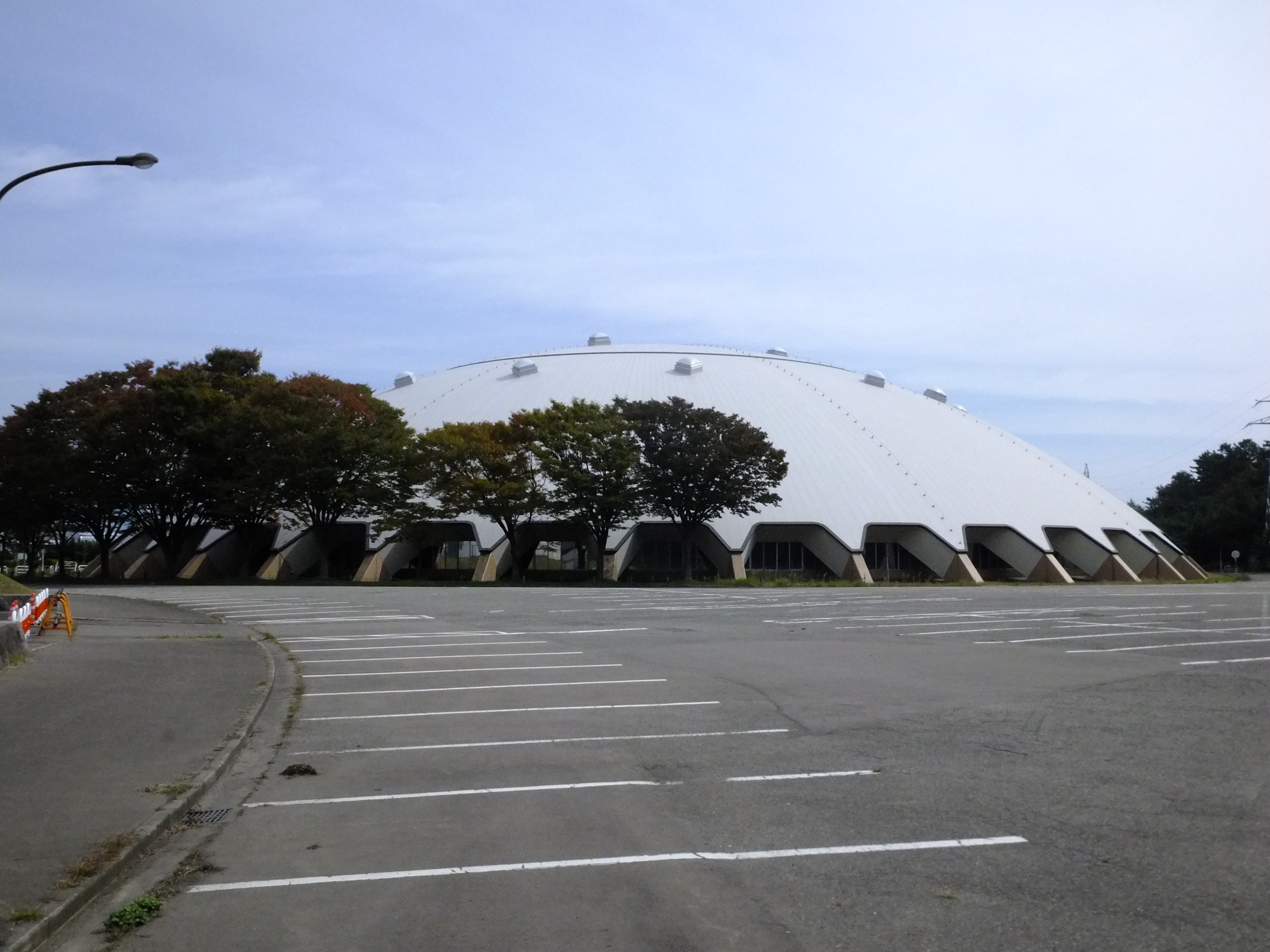
- Akita Prefectural Skating Rink
- Venue: Akita Prefectural Skating Rink, Akita, Japan
- Date: 22–23 August 2001
- Competitors: 8 from 4 nations

Medalists
1st place, gold medalist(s)		Adam White; Melissa Quinn	United States
2nd place, silver medalist(s)		Gawaine Davis; Ester Ambrus	Australia
3rd place, bronze medalist(s)		Gastón Passini; Analia Martínez	Argentina

The dance event in artistic roller skating at the 2001 World Games in Akita was played from 22 to 23 August. The skating competition took place at Akita Prefectural Skating Rink.

== Competition format ==
A total of 4 pairs entered the competition. Compulsory dance and free dance were held.

== Results ==
Rank	Nation	Athlete
1st place, gold medalist(s)	United States	Adam White; Melissa Quinn
2nd place, silver medalist(s)	Australia	Gawaine Davis; Ester Ambrus
3rd place, bronze medalist(s)	Argentina	Gastón Passini; Analia Martínez
4	Great Britain	Lisa Taylor; Anthony Murray
