= Inline speed skating at the 2001 World Games – Men's 15,000 m points elimination race =

Inline speed skating – men's 15,000 m points elimination at the 2001 World Games
- Venue: Akita Prefectural Skating Rink, Akita, Japan
- Date: 26 August 2001
- Competitors: 23 from 9 nations

Medalists
gold medal	(United States) Chad Hedrick
silver medal	(Colombia) Diego Rosero
bronze medal	(Colombia) Jorge Botero

The men's 15,000 m points elimination race in inline speed skating at the 2001 World Games took place on 26 August 2001 at the Akita Prefectural Skating Rink in Akita, Japan.

== Competition format ==
A total of 23 athletes entered the competition. Athlete with the most points is the winner.

== Results ==
Rank	Athlete	Nation	Points	Time
1st place, gold medalist(s)	Chad Hedrick	United States	92	23:36.21
2nd place, silver medalist(s)	Diego Rosero	Colombia	56	23:36.30
3rd place, bronze medalist(s)	Jorge Botero	Colombia	29	23:36.44
4	Derek Downing	United States	8	23:37.56
5	Daniel Zschätzsch	Germany	6	23:43.21
6	Christoph Zschätzsch	Germany	0	REL
7	Nico Wieduwilt	Germany	0	REL
8	Nick Tom	New Zealand	0	REL
9	Benjamin Zschätzsch	Germany	0	REL
10	Chen Wei-ming	Chinese Taipei	0	REL
11	Alain Gloor	Switzerland	0	REL
12	Shane Dobbin	New Zealand	29	REL
13	Su Jen-ping	Chinese Taipei	0	REL
14	Masatoshi Takahagi	Japan	2	REL
15	Fabian Arcila	Venezuela	0	REL
16	Sota Kazamaki	Japan	0	REL
17	Daisuke Kazamaki	Japan	0	REL
18	Liu Yu-shen	Chinese Taipei	0	REL
	Lo Hsuan-che	Chinese Taipei	0	DNF
	Miguel Rueda	Colombia	0	DNF
	Gregory Duggento	Italy	0	DNF
	Oscar Rivas	Venezuela	0	DNF
	Kalon Dobbin	New Zealand	DNS	
