= Inline speed skating at the 2001 World Games – Men's 300 m time trial =

Inline speed skating – men's 300 m time trial at the 2001 World Games
- Venue: Akita Prefectural Skating Rink, Akita, Japan
- Date: 24 August 2001
- Competitors: 24 from 10 nations

Medalists
gold medal	(Italy) Gregory Duggento
silver medal	(New Zealand) Kalon Dobbin
bronze medal	(United States) Chad Hedrick

The men's 300 m time trial competition in inline speed skating at the 2001 World Games took place on 24 August 2001 at the Akita Prefectural Skating Rink in Akita, Japan.

== Competition format ==
A total of 24 athletes entered the competition. Athlete with the fastest time is a winner.

== Results ==
Rank	Athlete	Nation	Time
1st place, gold medalist(s)	Gregory Duggento	Italy	25.084
2nd place, silver medalist(s)	Kalon Dobbin	New Zealand	25.185
3rd place, bronze medalist(s)	Chad Hedrick	United States	25.332
4	Miguel Rueda	Colombia	25.644
5	Shane Dobbin	New Zealand	25.664
6	Lo Hsuan-che	Chinese Taipei	26.064
7	Jorge Botero	Colombia	26.071
8	Derek Downing	United States	26.082
9	Liu Yu-shen	Chinese Taipei	26.106
10	Chen Wei-ming	Chinese Taipei	26.171
11	Diego Rosero	Colombia	26.193
12	Oscar Rivas	Venezuela	26.195
13	Daniel Zschätzsch	Germany	26.494
14	Fabian Arcila	Venezuela	26.494
15	Nick Tom	New Zealand	26.559
16	Masatoshi Takahagi	Japan	26.566
17	Sota Kazamaki	Japan	26.802
18	Su Jen-ping	Chinese Taipei	26.893
19	Nico Wieduwilt	Germany	26.968
20	Benjamin Zschätzsch	Germany	27.013
21	Christoph Zschätzsch	Germany	27.017
22	Daisuke Kazamaki	Japan	27.767
	Alexander Moreno	Costa Rica	DNS
	Alain Gloor	Switzerland	DNS
