= Inline speed skating at the 2001 World Games – Men's 500 m sprint =

Inline speed skating – men's 500 m sprint at the 2001 World Games
- Venue: Akita Prefectural Skating Rink, Akita, Japan
- Date: 24 August 2001
- Competitors: 21 from 8 nations

Medalists
gold medal	(United States) Chad Hedrick
silver medal	(Colombia) Miguel Rueda
bronze medal	(Italy) Gregory Duggento

The men's 500 m sprint competition in inline speed skating at the 2001 World Games took place on 24 August 2001 at the Akita Prefectural Skating Rink in Akita, Japan.

== Competition format ==
A total of 21 athletes entered the competition. Best two athletes from each heat advances to the next round.

== Results ==
=== Quarterfinals ===
Heat 1

Rank	Name	Country	Time	Notes
1	Gregory Duggento	Italy	42.59	Q
2	Liu Yu-shen	Chinese Taipei	42.65	Q
3	Sota Kazamaki	Japan	43.02	
4	Derek Downing	United States	43.29	
5	Masatoshi Takahagi	Japan	44.29	

Heat 3

Rank	Name	Country	Time	Notes
1	Chad Hedrick	United States	42.69	Q
2	Diego Rosero	Colombia	42.93	Q
3	Fabian Arcila	Venezuela	43.00	
4	Lo Hsuan-che	Chinese Taipei	43.45	
5	Nico Wieduwilt	Germany	43.50	
6	Daisuke Kazamaki	Japan	44.16	

Heat 2

Rank	Name	Country	Time	Notes
1	Kalon Dobbin	New Zealand	43.03	Q
2	Jorge Botero	Colombia	43.08	Q
3	Nick Tom	New Zealand	43.30	
4	Chen Wei-ming	Chinese Taipei	43.55	
5	Su Jen-ping	Chinese Taipei	43.79	

Heat 4

Rank	Name	Country	Time	Notes
1	Miguel Rueda	Colombia	43.20	Q
2	Shane Dobbin	New Zealand	43.31	Q
3	Christoph Zschätzsch	Germany	43.73	
4	Daniel Zschätzsch	Germany	43.82	
5	Oscar Rivas	Venezuela	43.97	

=== Semifinals ===
Heat 1

Rank	Name	Country	Time	Notes
1	Gregory Duggento	Italy	42.85	Q
2	Miguel Rueda	Colombia	42.95	Q
3	Liu Yu-shen	Chinese Taipei	43.05	
4	Shane Dobbin	New Zealand	43.22	

Heat 2

Rank	Name	Country	Time	Notes
1	Chad Hedrick	United States	42.32	Q
2	Jorge Botero	Colombia	42.42	Q
3	Kalon Dobbin	New Zealand	42.55	
4	Diego Rosero	Colombia	42.79	

=== Final ===
Rank	Name	Country	Time
1st place, gold medalist(s)	Chad Hedrick	United States	42.30
2nd place, silver medalist(s)	Miguel Rueda	Colombia	42.53
3rd place, bronze medalist(s)	Gregory Duggento	Italy	42.63
4	Jorge Botero	Colombia	42.63
