= Inline speed skating at the 2001 World Games – Men's 10,000 m points race =

Inline speed skating – men's 10,000 m points at the 2001 World Games
- Venue: Akita Prefectural Skating Rink, Akita, Japan
- Date: 25 August 2001
- Competitors: 23 from 9 nations

Medalists
gold medal	(United States) Chad Hedrick
silver medal	(New Zealand) Shane Dobbin
bronze medal	(Colombia) Jorge Botero

The men's 10,000 m points race in inline speed skating at the 2001 World Games took place on 25 August 2001 at the Akita Prefectural Skating Rink in Akita, Japan.

Early life and career

== Results ==
=== Preliminary ===
==== Heat A ====
Rank	Athlete	Nation	Points	Note
1	Diego Rosero	Colombia	27	Q
2	Kalon Dobbin	New Zealand	24	Q
3	Miguel Rueda	Colombia	22	Q
4	Alain Gloor	Switzerland	22	Q
5	Derek Downing	United States	19	Q
6	Benjamin Zschätzsch	Germany	14	Q
7	Sota Kazamaki	Japan	14	Q
8	Liu Yu-shen	Chinese Taipei	12	Q
9	Nico Wieduwilt	Germany	11	
10	Masatoshi Takahagi	Japan	9	
11	Oscar Rivas	Venezuela	6	
	Lo Hsuan-che	Chinese Taipei	0	DNF

==== Heat B ====
Rank	Athlete	Nation	Points	Note
1	Chad Hedrick	United States	34	Q
2	Chen Wei-ming	Chinese Taipei	28	Q
3	Jorge Botero	Colombia	27	Q
4	Shane Dobbin	New Zealand	21	Q
5	Daisuke Kazamaki	Japan	20	Q
6	Su Jen-ping	Chinese Taipei	18	Q
7	Nick Tom	New Zealand	13	Q
8	Christoph Zschätzsch	Germany	11	Q
9	Fabian Arcila	Venezuela	9	
	Daniel Zschätzsch	Germany	1	DNF
	Gregory Duggento	Italy	0	DNF

=== Final ===
Rank	Athlete	Nation	Points
1st place, gold medalist(s)	Chad Hedrick	United States	59
2nd place, silver medalist(s)	Shane Dobbin	New Zealand	51
3rd place, bronze medalist(s)	Jorge Botero	Colombia	41
4	Derek Downing	United States	7
5	Miguel Rueda	Colombia	7
6	Benjamin Zschätzsch	Germany	6
7	Su Jen-ping	Chinese Taipei	5
8	Christoph Zschätzsch	Germany	3
9	Alain Gloor	Switzerland	2
10	Nick Tom	New Zealand	1
11	Diego Rosero	Colombia	1
12	Chen Wei-ming	Chinese Taipei	0
13	Liu Yu-shen	Chinese Taipei	0
14	Daisuke Kazamaki	Japan	0
15	Sota Kazamaki	Japan	0
16	Kalon Dobbin	New Zealand	0
