= Karate at the 2001 World Games – Men's kumite 65 kg =

Karate men's kumite 65 kg at the 2001 World Games
- Venue: Tenno Town Gymnasium, Tenno, Akita, Japan
- Dates: 18 August 2001
- Competitors: 8 from 6 nations

Medalists
gold medal	(United Kingdom) Jason Ledgister
silver medal	(Venezuela) Jean Carlos Peña
bronze medal	(Japan) Yusuke Inokoshi

The men's kumite 65 kg competition in karate at the 2001 World Games took place on 18 August 2001 at the Tenno Town Gymnasium in Tenno, Akita, Japan.

== Competition format ==
A total of 8 athletes entered the competition. In preliminary round they fought in two groups. Winners of this groups advanced to gold medal match. Second place athletes advanced to bronze medal match.

== Results ==
=== Preliminary round ===
==== Group A ====
Rank	Athlete	B	W	D	L	Pts	SP	VEN	JPN	JPN
1	Jean Carlos Peña (VEN)	2	2	0	0	4	12		W	W
2	Yusuke Inokoshi (JPN)	2	1	0	1	2	8	L		W
3	Tsunaki Fujimura (JPN)	2	0	0	2	0	1	L	L	
	Bahattin Kandaz (TUR)	DNS								

==== Group B ====
Rank	Athlete	B	W	D	L	Pts	SP	GBR	GER	JPN	ESA
1	Jason Ledgister (GBR)	3	3	0	0	6	9		W	W	W
2	Lazar Boskovic (GER)	3	2	0	1	4	6	L		W	W
3	Shinji Nagaki (JPN)	3	1	0	2	2	17	L	L		W
4	Alberto Barillas (ESA)	3	0	0	3	0	4	L	L	L	

=== Finals ===
	Score	
Gold medal match
Jean Carlos Peña (VEN)	0−1	Jason Ledgister (GBR)
Bronze medal match
Yusuke Inokoshi (JPN)	6−0	Lazar Boskovic (GER)
