= Inline speed skating at the 2001 World Games – Women's 10,000 m points elimination race =

Inline speed skating – women's 10,000 m points elimination at the 2001 World Games
- Venue: Akita Prefectural Skating Rink, Akita, Japan
- Date: 25 August 2001
- Competitors: 16 from 7 nations

Medalists
gold medal	(Colombia) Alexandra Vivas
silver medal	(Chinese Taipei) Pan Yi-chin
bronze medal	(Colombia) Silvia Niño

The women's 10,000 m points elimination race in inline speed skating at the 2001 World Games took place on 25 August 2001 at the Akita Prefectural Skating Rink in Akita, Japan.

== Competition format ==
A total of 16 athletes entered the competition. Athlete with the most points is the winner.

== Results ==
Rank	Athlete	Nation	Points	Time
1st place, gold medalist(s)	Alexandra Vivas	Colombia	48	
2nd place, silver medalist(s)	Pan Yi-chin	Chinese Taipei	35	
3rd place, bronze medalist(s)	Silvia Niño	Colombia	33	
4	Liu Ling	Chinese Taipei	20	
5	Hou Hsin-yu	Chinese Taipei	2	
6	Ashley Horgan	United States	4	
7	Evelyn Kalbe	Germany	4	
8	Pan Li-ling	Chinese Taipei	9	
8	Berenice Moreno	Colombia	0	
8	Melanie Knopf	Germany	0	
8	Valentina Belloni	Italy	3	
8	Masami Matsushita	Japan	0	
8	Megumi Sonoda	Japan	0	
8	Rebecca Wooding	New Zealand	0	
8	Shannell Wooding	New Zealand	0	
8	Sarina Hayden	United States	0	
