= Inline speed skating at the 2001 World Games – Women's 5,000 m points race =

Inline speed skating – women's 5,000 m points at the 2001 World Games
- Venue: Akita Prefectural Skating Rink, Akita, Japan
- Date: 25 August 2001
- Competitors: 16 from 7 nations

Medalists
gold medal	(Colombia) Silvia Niño
silver medal	(Colombia) Alexandra Vivas
bronze medal	(Colombia) Berenice Moreno

The women's 5,000 m points race in inline speed skating at the 2001 World Games took place on 25 August 2001 at the Akita Prefectural Skating Rink in Akita, Japan.

== Competition format ==
A total of 16 athletes entered the competition. The best six athletes from each of preliminary heats qualifies to the final. Athlete with the most points is a winner.

== Results ==
=== Preliminary ===
==== Heat A ====
Rank	Athlete	Nation	Points	Note
1	Alexandra Vivas	Colombia	23	Q
2	Berenice Moreno	Colombia	22	Q
3	Liu Ling	Chinese Taipei	20	Q
4	Ashley Horgan	United States	16	Q
5	Hou Hsin-yu	Chinese Taipei	13	Q
6	Evelyn Kalbe	Germany	5	Q
7	Rebecca Wooding	New Zealand	4	
8	Masami Matsushita	Japan	0	

==== Heat B ====
Rank	Athlete	Nation	Points	Note
1	Valentina Belloni	Italy	22	Q
2	Pan Yi-chin	Chinese Taipei	21	Q
3	Pan Li-ling	Chinese Taipei	19	Q
4	Silvia Niño	Colombia	17	Q
5	Shannell Wooding	New Zealand	15	Q
6	Sarina Hayden	United States	8	Q
7	Megumi Sonoda	Japan	5	
8	Melanie Knopf	Germany	DNS	

=== Final ===
Rank	Athlete	Nation	Points
1st place, gold medalist(s)	Silvia Niño	Colombia	28
2nd place, silver medalist(s)	Alexandra Vivas	Colombia	20
3rd place, bronze medalist(s)	Berenice Moreno	Colombia	18
4	Pan Yi-chin	Chinese Taipei	16
5	Liu Ling	Chinese Taipei	9
6	Hou Hsin-yu	Chinese Taipei	7
7	Evelyn Kalbe	Germany	7
8	Shannell Wooding	New Zealand	5
9	Valentina Belloni	Italy	2
10	Ashley Horgan	United States	1
	Pan Li-ling	Chinese Taipei	DNF
	Sarina Hayden	United States	DNF
