= Boules sports at the 2001 World Games – Women's lyonnaise progressive doubles =

Boules - women's lyonnaise progressive doubles at the World Games
- Venue: World Games Plaza, Akita, Japan
- Date: 17–19 August 2001
- Competitors: 12 from 6 nations

Medalists
1st place, gold medalist(s)		Corine Maugiron; Valérie Maugiron	France
2nd place, silver medalist(s)		Ilenia Pasin; Laura Trova	Italy
3rd place, bronze medalist(s)		Petra Pivk; Nina Sodec	Slovenia

The women's lyonnaise progressive doubles event in boules sports at the 2001 World Games took place from 17 to 19 August 2001 at the World Games Plaza in Akita, Japan.

== Competition format ==
A total of 6 pairs entered the competition. Best four duets from preliminary round qualifies to the semifinal. From semifinal the best two pairs advances to the final.

== Results ==
=== Preliminary ===
Rank	Team	Nation	Score	Note
1	Ilenia Pasin; Laura Trova	Italy	70	Q
2	Corine Maugiron; Valérie Maugiron	France	57	Q
3	Petra Pivk; Nina Sodec	Slovenia	42	Q
4	Božica Brekalo; Nives Mladenić	Croatia	36	Q
5	Shio Masugi; Tae Sato	Japan	34	
6	Wang Mei; Li Kinhou	China	22	

=== Semifinal ===
Rank	Athlete	Nation	Score	Note
1	Corine Maugiron; Valérie Maugiron	France	68	Q
2	Ilenia Pasin; Laura Trova	Italy	62	Q
3	Petra Pivk; Nina Sodec	Slovenia	39	
4	Božica Brekalo; Nives Mladenić	Croatia	35	

=== Finals ===
	Score	
Bronze medal match
Božica Brekalo and Nives Mladenić (CRO)	37–48	Petra Pivk and Nina Sodec (SLO)
Gold medal match
Ilenia Pasin and Laura Trova (ITA)	62–63	Corine Maugiron and Valérie Maugiron (FRA)
