= Inline speed skating at the 2001 World Games =

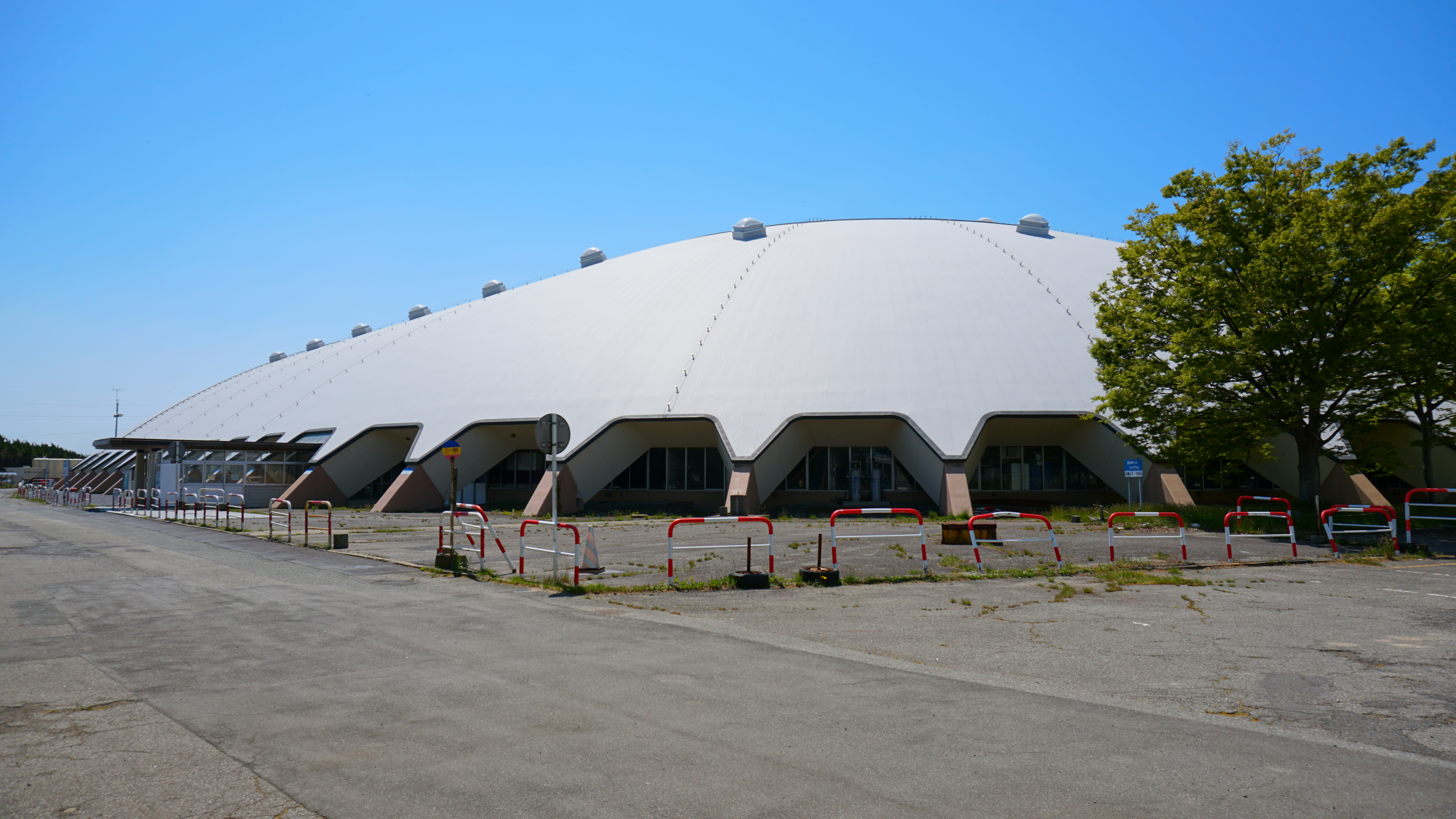
- Akita Prefectural Skating Rink
- Venue: Akita Prefectural Skating Rink
- Dates: 24–26 August 2001
- Competitors: 41 from 11 nations

The inline speed skating events at the 2001 World Games in Akita was played between 24 and 26 August. 41 roller skaters, from 11 nations, participated in the tournament. The competition took place at Akita Prefectural Skating Rink.

== Participating nations ==
- Chinese Taipei (8)
- Colombia (6)
- Costa Rica (1)
- Germany (6)
- Italy (2)
- Japan (5)
- Mexico (1)
- New Zealand (5)
- Switzerland (1)
- United States (4)
- Venezuela (2)

== Medal table ==
Rank	Nation	Gold	Silver	Bronze	Total
1	Colombia	3	5	5	13
2	United States	3	0	1	4
3	Chinese Taipei	2	2	2	6
4	New Zealand	1	2	0	3
5	Italy	1	1	1	3
6	Germany	0	0	1	1
Totals (6 entries)		10	10	10	30

== Events ==
=== Men ===
Event	Gold	Silver	Bronze
300 m time trial	Gregorio Duggento; Italy	Kalon Dobbin; New Zealand	Chad Hedrick; United States
500 m sprint	Chad Hedrick; United States	Miguel Rueda; Colombia	Gregorio Duggento; Italy
10,000 m points race	Chad Hedrick; United States	Shane Dobbin; New Zealand	Jorge Botero; Colombia
15,000 m points elimination race	Chad Hedrick; United States	Diego Rosero; Colombia	Jorge Botero; Colombia
20,000 m elimination race	Kalon Dobbin; New Zealand	Jorge Botero; Colombia	Christoph Zschätzsch; Germany

=== Women ===
Event	Gold	Silver	Bronze
300 m time trial	Pan Li-ling; Chinese Taipei	Valentina Belloni; Italy	Pan Yi-chin; Chinese Taipei
500 m sprint	Pan Li-ling; Chinese Taipei	Pan Yi-chin; Chinese Taipei	Berenice Moreno; Colombia
5,000 m points race	Silvia Niño; Colombia	Alexandra Vivas; Colombia	Berenice Moreno; Colombia
10,000 m points elimination race	Alexandra Vivas; Colombia	Pan Yi-chin; Chinese Taipei	Silvia Niño; Colombia
15,000 m elimination race	Berenice Moreno; Colombia	Silvia Niño; Colombia	Pan Yi-chin; Chinese Taipei
