= Air sports at the 2001 World Games – Women's freestyle skydiving =

Parachuting women's freestyle skydiving at the World Games
- Venue: Ogata Athletic Field, Ōgata, Akita, Japan
- Date: 17–19 August 2001
- Competitors: 10 from 4 nations

Medalists
1st place, gold medalist(s)		Stefania Martinengo; Filippo Fabbi	Italy
2nd place, silver medalist(s)		Yoko Okazaki; Axel Zohmann	Japan
3rd place, bronze medalist(s)		Gigliola Borgnis; Marco Tiezzi	Italy

The women's freestyle skydiving event at the 2001 World Games in Akita was played from 17 to 19 August. A total of ten parachuters, from four nations, participated in the tournament. The competition took place at Ogata Athletic Field in Ōgata .

== Competition format ==
A total of seven rounds were contested. The team with the most points is the winner.

== Results ==
Rank	Nation	Team	R1	R2	R3	R4	R5	R6	R7	Total
1st place, gold medalist(s)	Italy	Stefania Martinengo; Filippo Fabbi	5.1	9.0	9.1	9.1	5.3	9.1	9.1	55.8
2nd place, silver medalist(s)	Japan	Yoko Okazaki; Axel Zohmann	6.6	8.2	7.9	7.7	6.4	7.9	8.2	52.9
3rd place, bronze medalist(s)	Italy	Gigliola Borgnis; Marco Tiezzi	6.8	7.8	7.4	7.8	5.6	7.8	8.1	51.3
4	France	Emmanuelle Celicout; Alexandre Gillard	7.3	6.5	7.2	7.4	6.4	8.1	8.2	51.1
5	Germany	Anouschka Fiedler; Stefan Köhler	3.5	5.3	5.2	4.9	4.4	5.1	4.7	33.1
