= Inline speed skating at the 2001 World Games – Women's 15,000 m elimination race =

Inline speed skating – women's 15,000 m elimination at the 2001 World Games
- Venue: Akita Prefectural Skating Rink, Akita, Japan
- Date: 26 August 2001
- Competitors: 16 from 7 nations

Medalists
gold medal	(Colombia) Berenice Moreno
silver medal	(Colombia) Silvia Niño
bronze medal	(Chinese Taipei) Pan Yi-chin

The women's 15,000 m elimination race in inline speed skating at the 2001 World Games took place on 26 August 2001 at the Akita Prefectural Skating Rink in Akita, Japan.

== Competition format ==
A total of 16 athletes entered the competition. From the best five skaters, who weren't be eliminated the fastest is the winner.

== Results ==
Rank	Athlete	Nation	Time
1st place, gold medalist(s)	Berenice Moreno	Colombia	26:19.70
2nd place, silver medalist(s)	Silvia Niño	Colombia	26:19.79
3rd place, bronze medalist(s)	Pan Yi-chin	Chinese Taipei	26:19.87
4	Alexandra Vivas	Colombia	26:20.14
5	Liu Ling	Chinese Taipei	26:20.50
6	Ashley Horgan	United States	REL
7	Shannell Wooding	New Zealand	REL
8	Melanie Knopf	Germany	REL
9	Valentina Belloni	Italy	REL
10	Evelyn Kalbe	Germany	REL
11	Hou Hsin-yu	Chinese Taipei	REL
12	Rebecca Wooding	New Zealand	REL
13	Sarina Hayden	United States	REL
14	Pan Li-ling	Chinese Taipei	REL
15	Megumi Sonoda	Japan	REL
16	Masami Matsushita	Japan	REL
