= Inline speed skating at the 2001 World Games – Women's 300 m time trial =

Inline speed skating – women's 300 m time trial at the 2001 World Games
- Venue: Akita Prefectural Skating Rink, Akita, Japan
- Date: 24 August 2001
- Competitors: 17 from 8 nations

Medalists
gold medal	(Chinese Taipei) Pan Li-ling
silver medal	(Italy) Valentina Belloni
bronze medal	(Chinese Taipei) Pan Yi-chin

The women's 300 m time trial competition in inline speed skating at the 2001 World Games took place on 24 August 2001 at the Akita Prefectural Skating Rink in Akita, Japan.

== Competition format ==
A total of 17 athletes entered the competition. Athlete with the fastest time is a winner.

== Results ==
Rank	Athlete	Nation	Time
1st place, gold medalist(s)	Pan Li-ling	Chinese Taipei	26.978
2nd place, silver medalist(s)	Valentina Belloni	Italy	27.463
3rd place, bronze medalist(s)	Pan Yi-chin	Chinese Taipei	27.597
4	Berenice Moreno	Colombia	27.626
5	Sarina Hayden	United States	27.944
6	Liu Ling	Chinese Taipei	28.229
7	Melanie Knopf	Germany	28.333
8	Alexandra Vivas	Colombia	28.758
9	Evelyn Kalbe	Germany	29.261
10	Hou Hsin-yu	Chinese Taipei	29.262
11	Silvia Niño	Colombia	29.575
12	Shannell Wooding	New Zealand	29.602
13	Rebecca Wooding	New Zealand	30.092
14	Megumi Sonoda	Japan	30.100
15	Masami Matsushita	Japan	31.937
	Alcira Garcia	Mexico	DNS
	Ashley Horgan	United States	DNS
