= Inline speed skating at the 2001 World Games – Women's 500 m sprint =

Inline speed skating – women's 500 m sprint at the 2001 World Games
- Venue: Akita Prefectural Skating Rink, Akita, Japan
- Date: 24 August 2001
- Competitors: 15 from 7 nations

Medalists
gold medal	(Chinese Taipei) Pan Li-ling
silver medal	(Chinese Taipei) Pan Yi-chin
bronze medal	(Colombia) Berenice Moreno

The women's 500 m sprint competition in inline speed skating at the 2001 World Games took place on 24 August 2001 at the Akita Prefectural Skating Rink in Akita, Japan.

== Competition format ==
A total of 15 athletes entered the competition. Best two athletes from each heat advances to the next round.

== Results ==
=== Quarterfinals ===
Heat 1

Rank	Name	Country	Time	Notes
1	Pan Li-ling	Chinese Taipei	47.08	Q
2	Alexandra Vivas	Colombia	47.22	Q
3	Ashley Horgan	United States	47.34	

Heat 3

Rank	Name	Country	Time	Notes
1	Pan Yi-chin	Chinese Taipei	47.20	Q
2	Liu Ling	Chinese Taipei	47.35	Q
3	Silvia Niño	Colombia	47.41	
4	Megumi Sonoda	Japan	48.61	

Heat 2

Rank	Name	Country	Time	Notes
1	Valentina Belloni	Italy	47.12	Q
2	Melanie Knopf	Germany	47.22	Q
3	Hou Hsin-yu	Chinese Taipei	47.36	
4	Masami Matsushita	Japan	51.89	

Heat 4

Rank	Name	Country	Time	Notes
1	Berenice Moreno	Colombia	47.61	Q
2	Sarina Hayden	United States	47.71	Q
3	Rebecca Wooding	New Zealand	47.98	
4	Shannell Wooding	New Zealand	48.25	

=== Semifinals ===
Heat 1

Rank	Name	Country	Time	Notes
1	Pan Li-ling	Chinese Taipei	46.08	Q
2	Berenice Moreno	Colombia	46.88	Q
3	Alexandra Vivas	Colombia	47.28	
4	Sarina Hayden	United States	47.42	

Heat 2

Rank	Name	Country	Time	Notes
1	Valentina Belloni	Italy	47.24	Q
2	Pan Yi-chin	Chinese Taipei	47.31	Q
3	Melanie Knopf	Germany	47.38	
4	Liu Ling	Chinese Taipei	47.58	

=== Final ===
Rank	Name	Country	Time
1st place, gold medalist(s)	Pan Li-ling	Chinese Taipei	46.74
2nd place, silver medalist(s)	Pan Yi-chin	Chinese Taipei	46.84
3rd place, bronze medalist(s)	Berenice Moreno	Colombia	46.85
4	Valentina Belloni	Italy	46.94
