= Karate at the 2001 World Games =

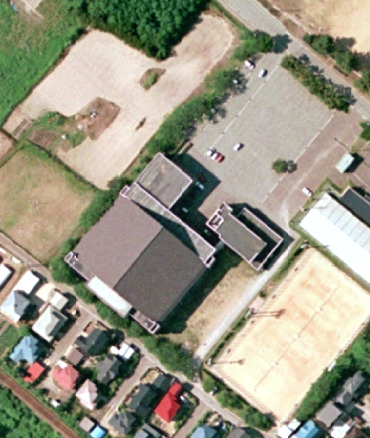
- Tenno Town Gymnasium
- Venue: Tenno Town Gymnasium
- Dates: 18–19 August 2001
- Competitors: 85 from 29 nations

The karate events at the 2001 World Games in Akita was played between 18 and 19 August. 85 athletes, from 29 nations, participated in the tournament. The karate competition took place at Tenno Town Gymnasium.

== Participating nations ==
- Australia (7)
- Austria (1)
- Bosnia and Herzegovina (1)
- Botswana (1)
- Croatia (1)
- Egypt (1)
- El Salvador (2)
- Finland (2)
- France (2)
- Great Britain (7)
- Germany (4)
- Greece (1)
- Guatemala (1)
- Iran (2)
- Italy (7)
- Japan (18)
- Luxembourg (1)
- Madagascar (1)
- Mexico (3)
- New Zealand (1)
- Peru (2)
- Senegal (2)
- Slovakia (1)
- South Africa (1)
- Tunisia (1)
- Turkey (1)
- United States (4)
- Venezuela (7)
- FR Yugoslavia (2)

== Medal table ==
Rank	Nation	Gold	Silver	Bronze	Total
1	Japan	6	3	2	11
2	Italy	2	3	0	5
3	France	2	0	0	2
4	Great Britain	1	0	4	5
5	South Africa	1	0	0	1
6	Venezuela	0	2	1	3
7	United States	0	1	1	2
8	Australia	0	1	0	1
8	Greece	0	1	0	1
8	Luxembourg	0	1	0	1
11	Bosnia and Herzegovina	0	0	1	1
11	Egypt	0	0	1	1
11	FR Yugoslavia	0	0	1	1
11	Finland	0	0	1	1
Totals (14 entries)		12	12	12	36

== Events ==
=== Men's events ===
Event	Gold	Silver	Bronze
Kata	Ryoki Abe; Japan	Luca Valdesi; Italy	Antonio Díaz; Venezuela
Kumite 60 kg	Kenichi Imai; Japan	Francesco Ortu; Italy	Milo Hodge; Great Britain
Kumite 65 kg	Jason Ledgister; Great Britain	Jean Carlos Peña; Venezuela	Yusuke Inokoshi; Japan
Kumite 70 kg	Yasuhisa Inada; Japan	Yoshinori Matsumoto; Japan	Hussein El-Desouky; Egypt
Kumite 75 kg	Gennaro Talarico; Italy	Takahiro Niki; Japan	Adnan Hadžić; Bosnia and Herzegovina
Kumite 80 kg	Salvatore Loria; Italy	Billy Finegan; United States	Ryosuke Shimizu; Japan
Kumite +80 kg	Seydina Baldé; France	Stefano Maniscalco; Italy	Leon Walters; Great Britain
Kumite open	David Félix; France	Konstantinos Papadopoulos; Greece	Craig Burke; Great Britain

=== Women's events ===
Event	Gold	Silver	Bronze
Kata	Atsuko Wakai; Japan	Yohana Sánchez; Venezuela	Junko Arai; United States
Kumite 53 kg	Sachiko Miyamoto; Japan	Eri Fujioka; Japan	Sari Laine; Finland
Kumite 60 kg	Karin Prinsloo; South Africa	Kellie Shimmings; Australia	Roksanda Lazarević; FR Yugoslavia
Kumite +60 kg	Emiko Honma; Japan	Tessy Scholtes; Luxembourg	Tania Weekes; Great Britain
