= Boules sports at the 2001 World Games – Men's lyonnaise progressive doubles =

Boules - men's lyonnaise progressive doubles at the World Games
- Venue: World Games Plaza, Akita, Japan
- Date: 17–19 August 2001
- Competitors: 12 from 6 nations

Medalists
1st place, gold medalist(s)		Laurent Duverger; Sébastien Grail	France
2nd place, silver medalist(s)		Michele Giordanino; Marco Ziraldo	Italy
3rd place, bronze medalist(s)		Gregor Košir; Zoran Rednak	Slovenia

The men's lyonnaise progressive doubles event in boules sports at the 2001 World Games took place from 17 to 19 August 2001 at the World Games Plaza in Akita, Japan.

== Competition format ==
A total of 6 pairs entered the competition. Best four duets from preliminary round qualify to the semifinal. From semifinal the best two pairs advance to the final.

== Results ==
=== Preliminary ===
Rank	Team	Nation	Score	Note
1	Gregor Košir; Zoran Rednak	Slovenia	78	Q
2	Laurent Duverger; Sébastien Grail	France	74	Q
3	Michele Giordanino; Marco Ziraldo	Italy	74	Q
4	Zlatko Jugo; Joško Mardešić	Croatia	66	Q
5	Darko Skanata; Miroslav Petković	FR Yugoslavia	51	
6	Robert Mikuletic; Rosario de Ieso	Australia	42	

=== Semifinal ===
Rank	Athlete	Nation	Score	Note
1	Laurent Duverger; Sébastien Grail	France	76	Q
1	Michele Giordanino; Marco Ziraldo	Italy	76	Q
3	Gregor Košir; Zoran Rednak	Slovenia	72	
4	Zlatko Jugo; Joško Mardešić	Croatia	66	

=== Finals ===
	Score	
Fifth place match
Robert Mikuletic and Rosario de Ieso (AUS)	52–51	Darko Skanata and Miroslav Petković (SCG)
Bronze medal match
Zlatko Jugo and Joško Mardešić (CRO)	68–74	Gregor Košir and Zoran Rednak (SLO)
Gold medal match
Michele Giordanino and Marco Ziraldo (ITA)	72–80	Laurent Duverger and Sébastien Grail (FRA)
