= Field archery at the 2001 World Games – Women's barebow =

Field archery women's barebow at the 2001 World Games
- Venue: Opas Skiing Spot, Akita, Japan
- Dates: 17–19 August 2001
- Competitors: 12 from 8 nations

Medalists
| gold medal | (Italy) Barbara Guiducci |
| silver medal | (United Kingdom) Patricia Lovell |
| bronze medal | (France) Odile Boussière |

The women's barebow archery competition at the 2001 World Games took place from 17 to 19 August 2001 at the Opas Skiing Spot in Akita, Japan.

== Competition format ==
A total of 12 archers entered the competition. The best four athletes from preliminary round qualifies to the semifinals.

== Results ==
=== Preliminary round ===
| Rank | Archer | Nation | Score | Note |
|---|---|---|---|---|
| 1 | Patricia Lovell | (United Kingdom) Great Britain | 581 | Q |
| 2 | Odile Boussière | France | 543 | Q |
| 3 | Barbara Guiducci | Italy | 526 | Q |
| 4 | Christine Gauthe | France | 519 | Q |
| 5 | Reingild Linhart | Austria | 514 | |
| 6 | Sachiko Hashimoto | Japan | 508 | |
| 7 | Staša Podgoršek | Slovenia | 503 | |
| 8 | Anita Cleven-van Pelt | Netherlands | 488 | |
| 9 | Miklosne Torok | Hungary | 478 | |
| 10 | Jane Rees | (United Kingdom) Great Britain | 465 | |
| 11 | Taeko Soma | Japan | 446 | |
| 12 | Sumiko Sawada | Japan | 423 | |

=== Finals ===
Semifinals
1 | (United Kingdom) Patricia Lovell | 54
4 | (France) Christine Gauthe | 38
2 | (France) Odile Boussière | 39
3 | (Italy) Barbara Guiducci | 43

Finals
1 | (United Kingdom) Patricia Lovell | 43
3 | (Italy) Barbara Guiducci | 45
Third place
4 | (France) Christine Gauthe | 30
2 | (France) Odile Boussière | 41
