= Inline speed skating at the 2005 World Games – Men's 500 m sprint =

Inline speed skating – men's 300 m time trial at the 2005 World Games
- Venue: Sportpark Wedau, Dreieckswiese, Duisburg, Germany
- Date: 20 July 2005
- Competitors: 24 from 13 nations

Medalists
gold medal	(New Zealand) Kalon Dobbin
silver medal	(Colombia) Anderson Ariza
bronze medal	(Colombia) Camilo Orozco

The men's 500 m sprint competition in inline speed skating at the 2005 World Games took place on 20 July 2005 at the Sportpark Wedau, Dreieckswiese in Duisburg, Germany.

== Competition format ==
A total of 24 athletes entered the competition. Best two athletes from each heat advances to the next round.

== Results ==
=== Preliminary Round ===
Heat 1

Rank	Name	Country	Time	Notes
1	Claudio Bontempo Scavo	Italy	46.81	Q
2	Gregorio Duggento	Italy	47.00	Q
3	Thomas Boucher	France	47.80	
4	Fabio Francolini	Italy	47.81	
	Jordan Allen Nelson	United States	DNS	

Heat 3

Rank	Name	Country	Time	Notes
1	Baptiste Grandgirard	France	47.20	Q
2	Wayne Begg	New Zealand	47.34	Q
3	Matthias Schwierz	Germany	47.46	
4	Javier McCargo	Argentina	47.80	
	Jernej Letica	Slovenia	DNS	

Heat 2

Rank	Name	Country	Time	Notes
1	Kalon Dobbin	New Zealand	45.65	Q
2	Wouter Hebbrecht	Belgium	45.79	Q
3	Matteo Amabili	Italy	46.00	
4	Guido Cicconi	Italy	46.05	
5	Daniel Zschätzsch	Germany	46.46	

Heat 4

Rank	Name	Country	Time	Notes
1	Camilo Orozco	Colombia	46.12	Q
2	Anderson Ariza	Colombia	46.18	Q
3	José Guzmán	Chile	46.23	
4	Nicolay Garikoitz Lerga	Spain	47.14	
	Daniel Alvarez	Venezuela	DNS	

Heat 5

Rank	Name	Country	Time	Notes
1	Pan Wen-chih	Chinese Taipei	50.19	Q
2	Toni Deubner	Germany	50.28	Q
	Shane Dobbin	New Zealand	DNS	
	Alexis Contin	France	DNS	

=== Semifinals ===
Heat 1

Rank	Name	Country	Time	Notes
1	Camilo Orozco	Colombia	45.80	Q
2	Anderson Ariza	Colombia	46.03	Q
3	Claudio Bontempo Scavo	Italy	46.19	
4	Wayne Begg	New Zealand	46.38	
5	Pan Wen-chih	Chinese Taipei	46.75	

Heat 2

Rank	Name	Country	Time	Notes
1	Kalon Dobbin	New Zealand	45.78	Q
2	Gregorio Duggento	Italy	46.23	Q
3	Baptiste Grandgirard	France	46.36	Q
4	Wouter Hebbrecht	Belgium	46.58	Q
5	Toni Deubner	Germany	46.67	Q

=== Final ===
Rank	Name	Country	Time
1st place, gold medalist(s)	Kalon Dobbin	New Zealand	44.89
2nd place, silver medalist(s)	Anderson Ariza	Colombia	45.37
3rd place, bronze medalist(s)	Camilo Orozco	Colombia	45.41
4	Gregorio Duggento	Italy	45.96
