= Inline speed skating at the 2005 World Games – Men's 300 m time trial =

Inline speed skating – men's 300 m time trial at the 2005 World Games
- Venue: Sportpark Wedau, Dreieckswiese, Duisburg, Germany
- Date: 19 July 2005
- Competitors: 22 from 11 nations

Medalists
gold medal	(Italy) Gregory Duggento
silver medal	(New Zealand) Kalon Dobbin
bronze medal	(Argentina) Javier McCargo

The men's 300 m time trial competition in inline speed skating at the 2005 World Games took place on 19 July 2005 at the Sportpark Wedau, Dreieckswiese in Duisburg, Germany.

== Competition format ==
A total of 22 athletes entered the competition. Athlete with the fastest time is a winner.

== Results ==
Rank	Athlete	Nation	Time
1st place, gold medalist(s)	Gregory Duggento	Italy	26.40
2nd place, silver medalist(s)	Kalon Dobbin	New Zealand	26.42
3rd place, bronze medalist(s)	Javier McCargo	Argentina	26.80
4	Jose Guzman Fuher	Chile	26.95
5	Shane Dobbin	New Zealand	27.00
6	Pan Wen-chih	Chinese Taipei	27.02
7	Camilo Orozco	Colombia	27.05
8	Matthias Schwierz	Germany	27.10
9	Wouter Hebbrecht	Belgium	27.12
10	Thomas Boucher	France	27.33
11	Claudio Bontempo	Italy	27.34
12	Daniel Zschätzsch	Germany	27.490
13	Wayne Begg	New Zealand	27.499
14	Anderson Ariza	Colombia	27.55
15	Alexis Contin	France	27.61
16	Toni Deubner	Germany	27.78
17	Daniel Alvarez	Venezuela	27.80
18	Baptiste Grandgirard	France	27.84
19	Guido Cicconi	Italy	28.04
20	Jordan Nelson	United States	28.30
21	Fabio Francolini	Italy	28.60
22	Matteo Amabili	Italy	28.61
