= Karate at the 2001 World Games – Men's kumite open =

Karate men's kumite open at the 2001 World Games
- Venue: Tenno Town Gymnasium, Tenno, Akita, Japan
- Dates: 19 August 2001
- Competitors: 8 from 8 nations

Medalists
| gold medal | (France) David Félix |
| silver medal | (Greece) Konstantinos Papadopoulos |
| bronze medal | (United Kingdom) Craig Burke |

The men's kumite open competition in karate at the 2001 World Games took place on 19 August 2001 at the Tenno Town Gymnasium in Tenno, Akita, Japan.

== Competition format ==
A total of 8 athletes entered the competition. In preliminary round they fought in two groups. Winners of this groups advanced to gold medal match. Second place athletes advanced to bronze medal match.

== Results ==
=== Preliminary round ===
==== Group A ====
| Rank | Athlete | B | W | D | L | Pts | SP | GRE | GBR | JPN | VEN |
|---|---|---|---|---|---|---|---|---|---|---|---|
| 1 | Konstantinos Papadopoulos (GRE) | 3 | 3 | 0 | 0 | 6 | 18 | | W | W | W |
| 2 | Craig Burke (GBR) | 3 | 2 | 0 | 1 | 4 | 12 | L | | W | W |
| 3 | Kiyohiko Tosa (JPN) | 3 | 0 | 1 | 2 | 1 | 14 | L | L | | D |
| 4 | Oswaldo Lopez (VEN) | 3 | 0 | 1 | 2 | 1 | 7 | L | L | D | |

==== Group B ====
| Rank | Athlete | B | W | D | L | Pts | SP | FRA | IRI | ITA | USA |
|---|---|---|---|---|---|---|---|---|---|---|---|
| 1 | David Félix (FRA) | 3 | 2 | 1 | 0 | 5 | 11 | | D | W | W |
| 2 | Ali Shaterzadeh (IRI) | 3 | 2 | 1 | 0 | 5 | 6 | D | | W | W |
| 3 | Davide Benetello (ITA) | 3 | 1 | 0 | 2 | 2 | 3 | L | L | | W |
| | Alireza Anissipour (USA) | 3 | 0 | 0 | 3 | 0 | 0 | L | L | L | |

=== Finals ===
| | Score | |
Gold medal match
| Konstantinos Papadopoulos (GRE) | 1−6 | David Félix (FRA) |
Bronze medal match
| Craig Burke (GBR) | 4−1 | Ali Shaterzadeh (IRI) |
