= Field archery at the 2001 World Games – Men's barebow =

Field archery men's barebow at the 2001 World Games
- Venue: Opas Skiing Spot, Akita, Japan
- Dates: 17–19 August 2001
- Competitors: 12 from 8 nations

Medalists
gold medal	(Sweden) Erik Jonsson
silver medal	(Slovenia) Žare Krajnc
bronze medal	(Sweden) Mathias Larsson

The men's barebow archery competition at the 2001 World Games took place from 17 to 19 August 2001 at the Opas Skiing Spot in Akita, Japan.

== Competition format ==
A total of 12 archers entered the competition. The best four athletes from preliminary round qualifies to the semifinals.

== Results ==
=== Preliminary round ===
Rank	Archer	Nation	Score	Note
1	Mathias Larsson	Sweden	653	Q
2	Erik Jonsson	Sweden	648	Q
3	Daniele Bellotti	Italy	639	Q
4	Žare Krajnc	Slovenia	638	Q
5	Christophe Clement	France	626	
6	Marjan Podrzaj	Slovenia	626	
7	Twan Cleven	Netherlands	624	
8	Peter Mulligan	(United Kingdom) Great Britain	621	
9	Danny Aerts	Belgium	590	
10	Shinichi Sasaki	Japan	586	
11	Sumitaka Goto	Japan	547	
12	Akisumi Yamaguchi	Japan	520	

=== Finals ===
Semifinals
1	(Sweden) Mathias Larsson	47
4	(Slovenia) Žare Krajnc	49
2	(Sweden) Erik Jonsson	52
3	(Italy) Daniele Bellotti	49

Finals
4	(Slovenia) Žare Krajnc	48
2	(Sweden) Erik Jonsson	50
Third place
1	(Sweden) Mathias Larsson	54
3	(Italy) Daniele Bellotti	49
