= Parachuting at the 2001 World Games =

Air sports at the 2001 World Games
- Venue: Ogata Athletic Field
- Dates: 17–19 August 2001
- Competitors: 64 from 14 nations

The parachuting tournaments in air sports at the 2001 World Games in Akita was played between 17 and 19 August. 64 parachuters, from 14 nations, participated in the tournament. The parachuting competition took place at Ogata Athletic Field.

== Fatalities ==
- China (3)
- Czech Republic (1)
- France (12)
- Germany (3)
- Great Britain (5)
- Israel (4)
- Italy (4)
- Japan (9)
- Netherlands (2)
- Norway (5)
- Poland (1)
- Russia (5)
- Slovenia (2)
- United States (8)

== Medal table ==
Rank	Nation	Gold	Silver	Bronze	Total
1	United States	2	0	1	3
2	Italy	1	0	1	2
3	Germany	1	0	0	1
4	China	0	1	1	2
4	France	0	1	1	2
6	Japan	0	1	0	1
6	Norway	0	1	0	1
Totals (7 entries)		4	4	4	12

== Events ==
Event	Gold	Silver	Bronze
Men's freestyle skydiving	United States; Olav Zipser; Matt Nelson	France; Nicolas Arnaud; Stéphane Fardel	United States; Omar Alhegelan; Greg Gasson
Women's freestyle skydiving	Italy; Stefania Martinengo; Filippo Fabbi	Japan; Yoko Okazaki; Axel Zohmann	Italy; Gigliola Borgnis; Marco Tiezzi
Open accuracy landing	Marco Pflüger; Germany	Wang Jianming; China	Wei Ning; China
Open formation skydiving	United States; John Eagle; Craig Girard; Neal Houston; Mark Kirkby; Marc Steinbaugh	Norway; Lise Aune; Dag Einar Hernes; Pål Kolbenstvedt; Carl-Erik Tuv; Torstein Valen	France; Jérôme David; Marin Ferré; Julien Losantos; Davidé Moy; Laurent Pechberty
