= Double push =

Inline speed skating technique

Schematic illustration of double-push technique used for inline skating. skating. Only track of right skate is shown for conventional skate and double push. Dashed line shows averages movement of skater.

Double push is an inline speed skating technique. Its major advantage over the previously practised "classic" technique is that it allows the skater to do useful work during the part of the stride that was "wasted", and therefore to go faster. Opinions differ on its usefulness for non-elite skaters as it requires much practice before a skater is faster using doublepush than without.

== History ==
It is uncertain who first invented the doublepush. Chad Hedrick is generally acknowledged as having brought it to the public eye. Prior to Chad's arrival on the scene circa 1992, inline speed skaters used the classic speed skating technique derived from ice speed skating. Hedrick's alternative approach rapidly proved itself to be faster and was soon adopted by many elite skaters.

== Technique ==
Wheels used in speed skating are usually round or elliptical in profile, and do not literally have edges. The terminology is carried over from ice skate blades, which have edges. In inline skating, being "on an inside edge" refers to skating with the wheel of the skate leaning inwards (i.e. medially: right skate leaning left, and vice versa). An outside edge is the opposite, and a center edge implies that the wheel is vertical.

The classic speedskating technique is an alternating cycle of inside-edge pushes and outer-edge glides. The cycle starts as the skater is gliding on one (let us suppose the right) leg with a bent knee. Then the right knee straightens (extends) while leaning to the left. The direction of the push is therefore outwards (rightwards) from the center of mass. When the pushing leg reaches full extension, the left (now support) leg is set down and used to glide, while the right leg lifts and is brought back behind and underneath the skater (recovery) ready to be placed on the ground (set down) and become the new support leg. Once the pushing leg has been recovered, the support leg pushes out in the other direction and the cycle repeats. Note that the pushes are always in a lateral direction: the left leg pushes exclusively leftwards, and the right leg exclusively rightwards.

This will naturally result in a push that starts on the center edge or on a slight outside edge and "rolls over" onto the inside edge as the foot moves away from the skater's center of mass.

The double-push eliminates the "glide" phase from the above cycle, replacing it with a medially-directed "underpush" on the outside-edge. The recovery skate is placed on an outside edge and pushed underneath the body (right leg pushes leftward, and vice versa) while maintaining that outside edge, before being steered or pulled back across the centerline for the regular inside-edge push that follows. By its nature the double-push is less stable than classic technique, making it difficult to learn. If the skater should lose traction during an underpush there is no support leg to fall back on. The double-push also allows for the very brief application of force through both legs simultaneously. The skater does this by transferring weight from the inside-edge foot to the outside-edge foot gradually, rather than transferring all weight to the outside-edge foot instantly. Some hold that this is essential to the double push, but this opinion is not universal.

== Advantages ==
The principal advantage of the double push is that it allows skaters to generate propulsive force during a part of the stroke cycle which was previously wasted. In the glide phase of the classic stroke, friction from road, atmosphere and bearings tends to slow skaters down, yet the deep knee flexion during this part of the cycle fatigues the muscles. Using DP, skaters can do useful work in this time instead. This is beneficial to their muscles and also helps keep speed more nearly constant instead of surging ahead and then slowing down repeatedly.

The DP extends the effective stroke length. One of the best ways to go faster is to push further in each stroke, but whereas traditionally this requires sitting lower (restricting blood flow and increasing lactic acid production in the muscles), in DP the same leg at a higher bend angle can achieve a longer effective stroke by pushing both inward and outwards.

== Double-Push On Ice ==
Although it is possible to use the double-push in ice skating, it is by no means certain that it can provide the same advantage that it can in inline skating. This has been attributed to the different characteristics of edging on ice. Whereas an inline skate on a center edge continues to grip the road, an ice blade on a center edge will slip if pushed sideways: it must be on an inside or outside edge if it is to "dig into" the ice.

Although some skaters can be seen to be underpushing slightly on ice, the effect is much more subtle. Chad Hedrick, due to his success in connection with the DP, has had his form widely commented on since he moved to ice. The DP has not been widely adopted on ice. Whether this is because it makes little practical difference or for other reasons is at present difficult to say.

The main reason why DP does not work on ice, it is proposed, is that ice skates can move only on a straight line or on a big radius, while DP requires carving movements. Perhaps some technical developments could enable creating an ice speed skate that can carve, but it may have more drag. This problem is similar to cross country skis that do not enable carving techniques.
