= Casting at the 2001 World Games =

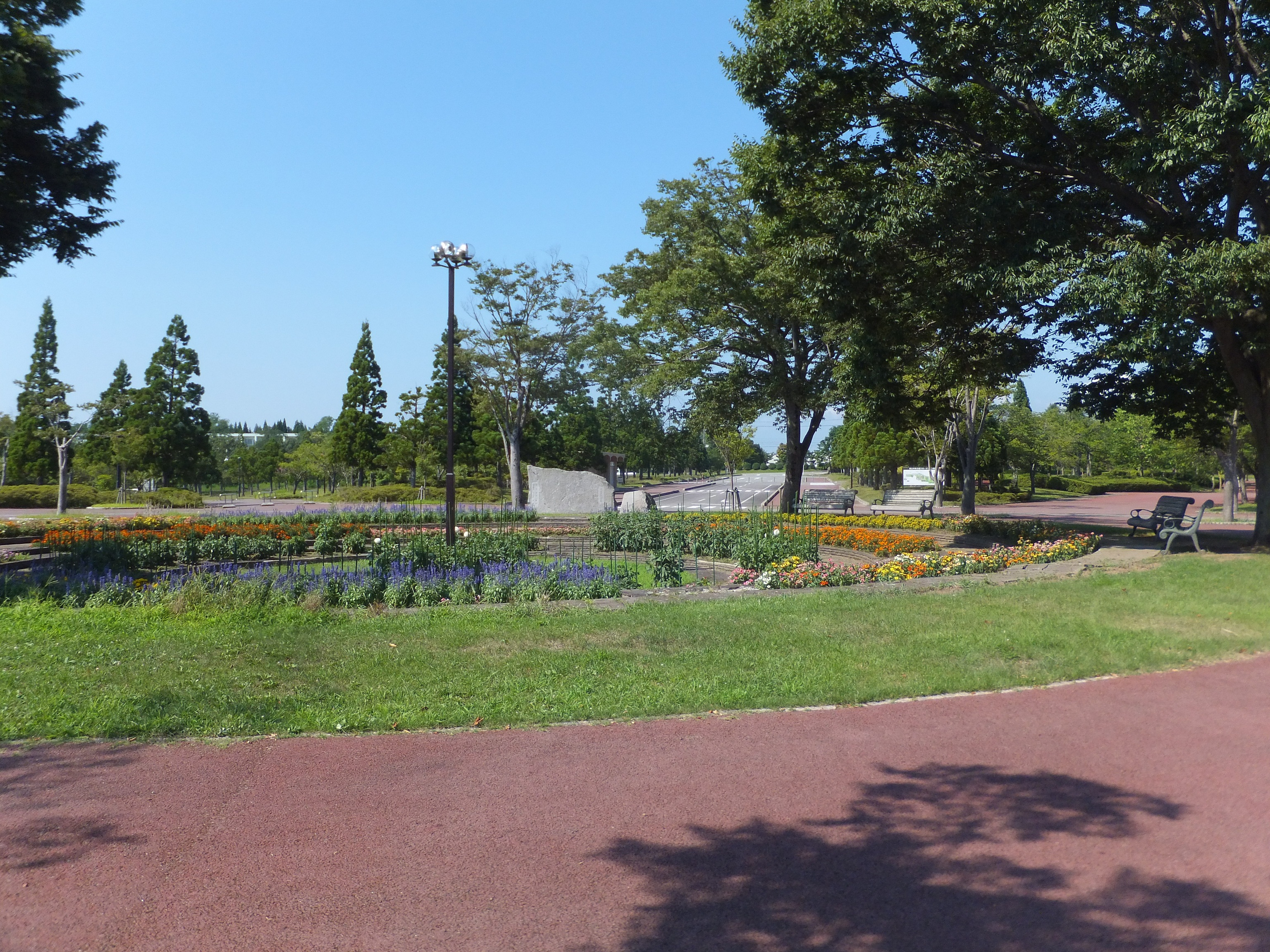
- Akita Prefectural Central Park
- Venue: Akita Prefectural Central Park
- Dates: 22–24 August 2001
- Competitors: 48 from 12 nations

The casting tournaments at the 2001 World Games in Akita was played between 22 and 24 August. 48 athletes, from 12 nations, participated in the tournament. The casting competition took place in Akita Prefectural Central Park.

== Participating nations ==
- Austria (5)
- Czech Republic (5)
- Germany (7)
- Japan (11)
- Lithuania (2)
- Norway (2)
- Poland (4)
- Slovakia (4)
- South Africa (1)
- Sweden (3)
- Switzerland (1)
- United States (3)

== Medal table ==
Rank	Nation	Gold	Silver	Bronze	Total
1	Germany	4	2	1	7
2	Sweden	1	1	2	4
3	Poland	1	0	0	1
4	Czech Republic	0	1	2	3
5	Austria	0	1	1	2
6	United States	0	1	0	1
Totals (6 entries)		6	6	6	18

== Events ==
=== Men ===
Event	Gold	Silver	Bronze
Fly accuracy	Henrik Österberg; Sweden	Henrik Harjanne; Sweden	Jan Luxa; Czech Republic
Fly distance single handed	Jacek Kuza; Poland	Jan Luxa; Czech Republic	Henrik Österberg; Sweden
Multiplier accuracy	Michael Harter; Germany	Steve Rajeff; United States	Henrik Österberg; Sweden

=== Women ===
Event	Gold	Silver	Bronze
Fly accuracy	Jana Maisel; Germany	Alena Zinner; Austria	Zuzana Kočířová; Czech Republic
Fly distance single handed	Kathrin Ernst; Germany	Tina Gerlach; Germany	Alena Zinner; Austria
Multiplier accuracy	Jana Maisel; Germany	Tina Gerlach; Germany	Kathrin Ernst; Germany
