= Roller hockey at the 2001 World Games =

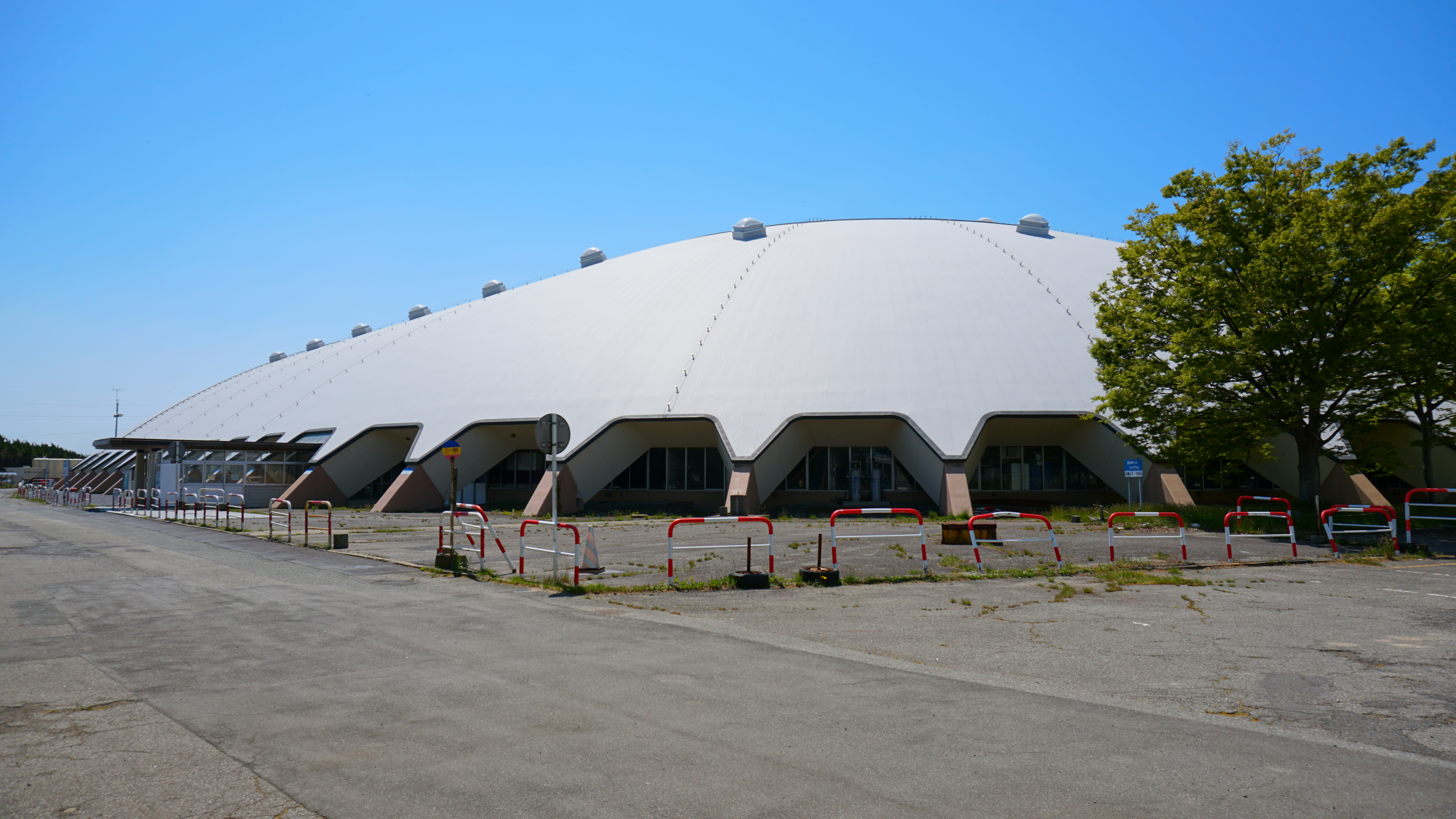
- Akita Prefectural Rink
- Venue: Akita Prefectural Rink
- Location: (Japan) Akita
- Dates: 17–20 August 2001
- Competitors: 56 from 6 nations

Medalists
gold medal	Portugal
silver medal	Brazil
bronze medal	Germany

The roller hockey tournament at the 2001 World Games in Akita, Japan took place between the 17th and the 20th of August. A total of 56 athletes from 6 national teams entered the competition. The competition took place in Akita Prefectural Rink.

== Competition format ==
A total of six teams played in round-robin system. Team with the most points is a winner.

== Teams ==
- Australia
- Brazil
- Germany
- (United Kingdom) Great Britain
- Japan
- Portugal

== Results ==
Pos	Team	Pld	W	D	L	GF	GA	GD	Pts	(Portugal)	(Brazil)	(Germany)	(United Kingdom)	(Australia)	(Japan)
1	Portugal	5	5	0	0	87	10	+77	15	—	8–3	13–1	15–1	27–2	24–3
2	Brazil	5	3	1	1	40	18	+22	10	3–8	—	4–4	6–4	15–1	12–1
3	Germany	5	3	1	1	34	21	+13	10	1–13	4–4	—	5–3	9–1	15–0
4	(United Kingdom) Great Britain	5	2	0	3	21	28	−7	6	1–15	4–6	3–5	—	9–1	4–1
5	Australia	5	1	0	4	9	62	−53	3	2–27	1–15	1–9	1–9	—	4–2
6	Japan	5	0	0	5	7	59	−52	0	3–24	1–12	0–15	1–4	2–4	—

Source: 2001 World Games

== Final ranking ==
Rank	Team
Gold medal	Portugal
Silver medal	Brazil
Bronze medal	Germany
4	(United Kingdom) Great Britain
5	Australia
6	Japan
