= Field archery at the 2001 World Games =

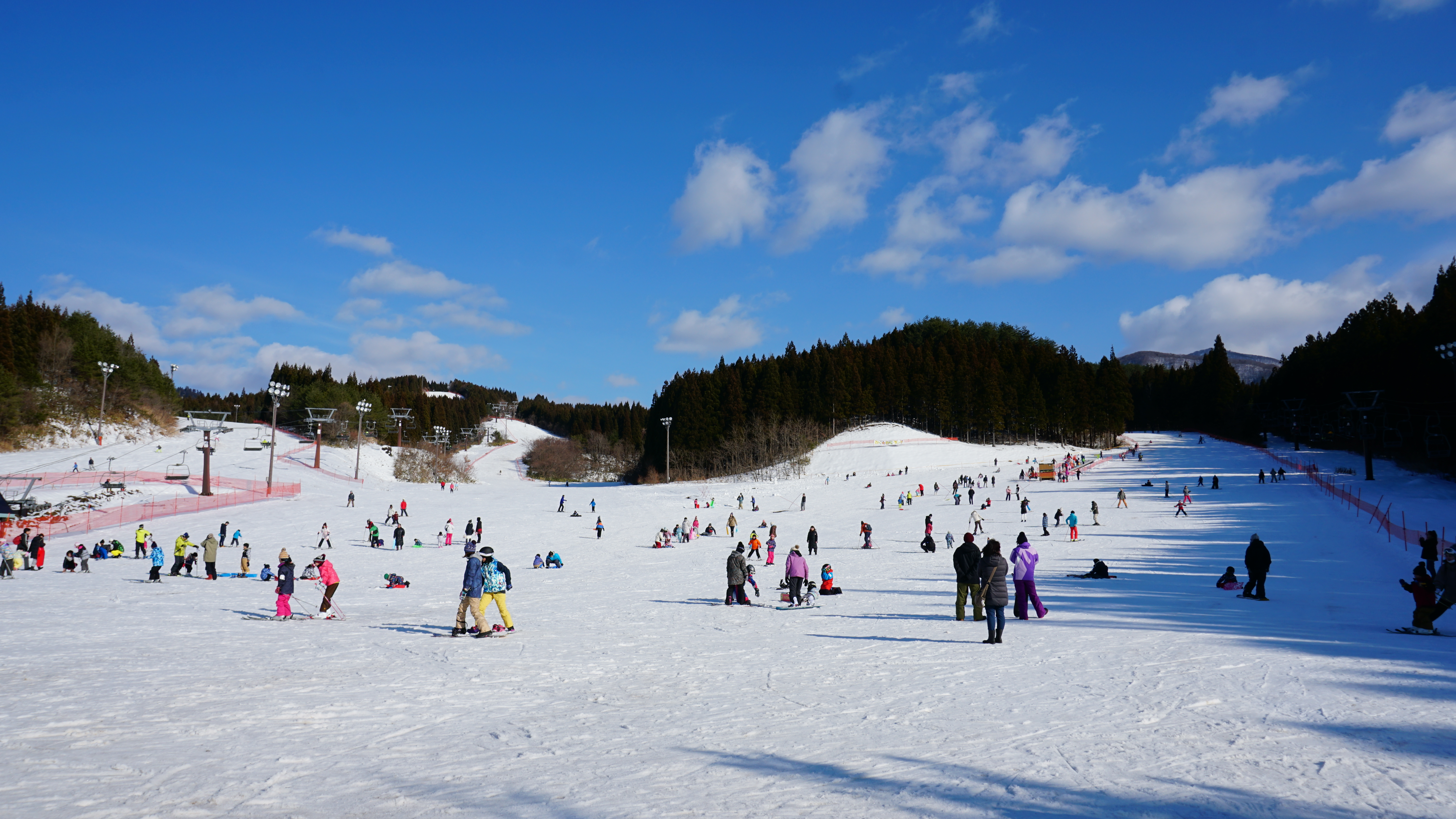
- Opas Skiing Spot
- Venue: Opas Skiing Spot
- Dates: 17–19 August 2001
- Competitors: 90 from 18 nations

The field archery tournaments at the 2001 World Games in Akita was played between 17 and 19 August. 90 archers, from 18 nations, participated in the tournament. The archery competition took place at Opas Skiing Spot.

== Participating nations ==
- Australia (3)
- Austria (5)
- Belgium (2)
- Finland (1)
- France (10)
- Great Britain (7)
- Hong Kong (1)
- Hungary (3)
- Italy (8)
- Japan (14)
- Netherlands (6)
- New Zealand (4)
- Norway (4)
- Slovenia (6)
- Sri Lanka (1)
- Sweden (8)
- Switzerland (1)
- United States (6)

== Medal table ==
Rank	Nation	Gold	Silver	Bronze	Total
1	United States	3	0	0	3
2	Italy	1	2	1	4
3	Sweden	1	1	1	3
4	France	1	0	4	5
5	Austria	0	1	0	1
5	Great Britain	0	1	0	1
5	Slovenia	0	1	0	1
Totals (7 entries)		6	6	6	18

== Events ==
=== Men's events ===
Event	Gold	Silver	Bronze
Recurve	Jay Barrs; United States	Michele Frangilli; Italy	Fulvio Verdecchia; Italy
Compound	Dave Cousins; United States	Björn Andersson; Sweden	Hervé Dardant; France
Barebow	Erik Jansson; Sweden	Žare Krajnc; Slovenia	Mattias Larsson; Sweden

=== Women's events ===
Event	Gold	Silver	Bronze
Recurve	Carole Ferriou; France	Elisabeth Grube; Austria	Laure Barczynski; France
Compound	Michelle Ragsdale; United States	Giorgia Solato; Italy	Françoise Volle; France
Barebow	Barbara Guiducci; Italy	Patricia Lovell; Great Britain	Odile Boussière; France
