= Water skiing at the 2001 World Games =

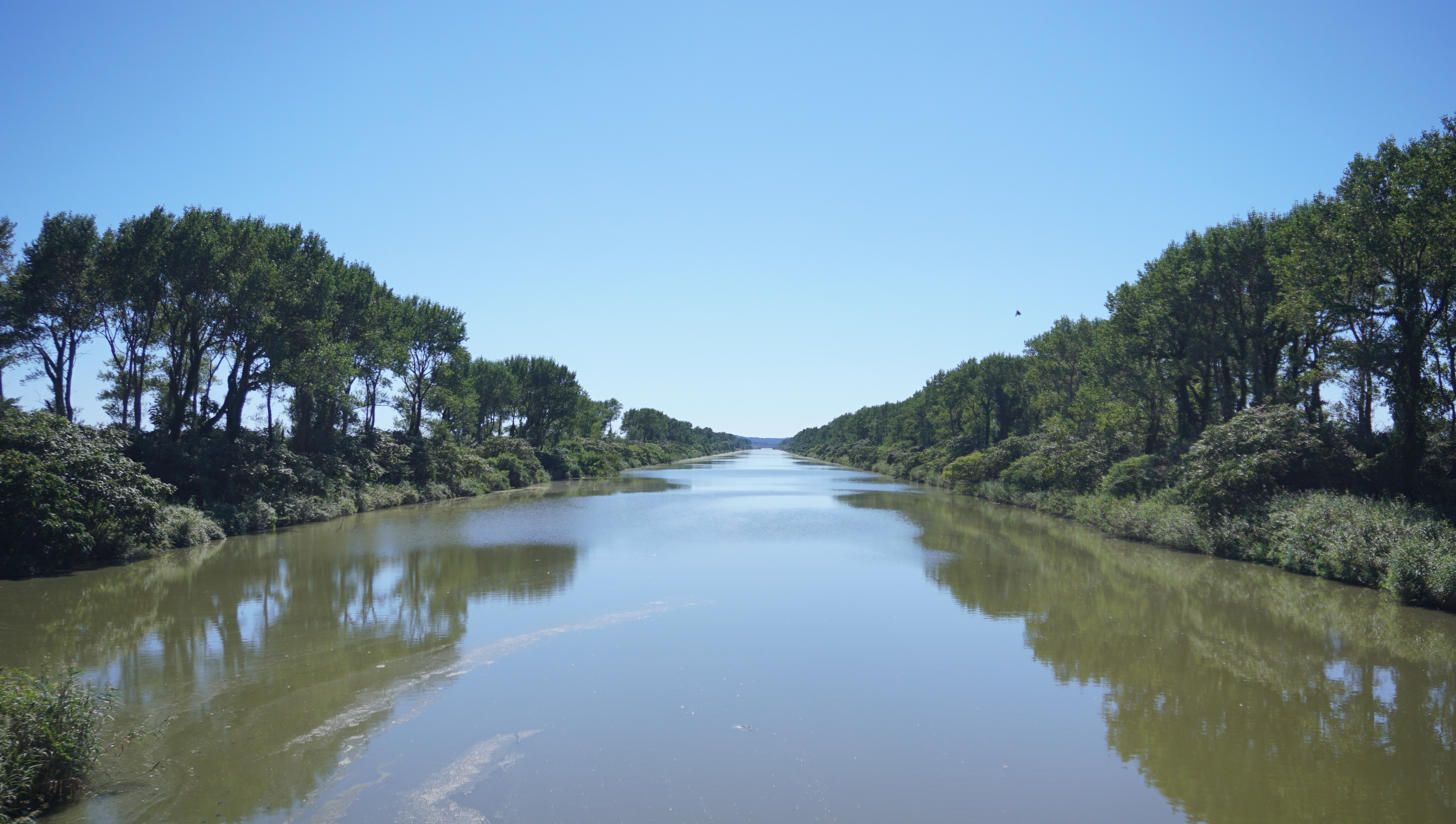
- Ogata Water Ski Course
- Venue: Ogata Water Ski Course (40°1′55.3″N 140°02′40.4″E)
- Dates: 23–25 August 2001
- Competitors: 73 from 25 nations

The water skiing events at the 2001 World Games in Akita was played between 23 and 25 August. 73 athletes, from 25 nations, participated in the tournament. The water skiing competition took place at Ogata Water Ski Course.

== Participating nations ==
- Australia (6)
- Austria (1)
- Belgium (1)
- Canada (1)
- China (1)
- Colombia (2)
- Czech Republic (2)
- France (3)
- Germany (5)
- Great Britain (5)
- Greece (2)
- Italy (4)
- Japan (12)
- Mexico (1)
- Netherlands (4)
- Norway (1)
- New Zealand (3)
- South Africa (5)
- South Korea (3)
- Russia (1)
- Singapore (1)
- Slovakia (1)
- Switzerland (1)
- Sweden (1)
- United States (6)

== Medal table ==
Rank	Nation	Gold	Silver	Bronze	Total
1	France	2	0	0	2
2	South Africa	1	1	0	2
2	United States	1	1	0	2
4	Japan	1	0	1	2
5	Russia	1	0	0	1
6	Great Britain	0	2	2	4
7	Australia	0	1	0	1
7	Greece	0	1	0	1
9	Italy	0	0	1	1
9	Netherlands	0	0	1	1
9	Norway	0	0	1	1
Totals (11 entries)		6	6	6	18

== Events ==
=== Men's events ===
Event	Gold	Silver	Bronze
Three event	Patrice Martin; France	Jason Seels; Great Britain	Tom Asher; Great Britain
Barefoot three event	Keith St. Onge; United States	David Small; Great Britain	Evert Aartsen; Netherlands
Wakeboard	Rodo Vinh-Tung; France	Morgan Krause; South Africa	Fabrizio Benelli; Italy

=== Women's events ===
Event	Gold	Silver	Bronze
Three event	Elena Milakova; Russia	Angeliki Andriopoulou; Greece	Sarah Gatty Saunt; Great Britain
Barefoot three event	Nadine de Villiers; South Africa	Rachel George; United States	Kirsten Grønvik; Norway
Wakeboard	Mero Narita; Japan	Leza Bugden; Australia	Kiyomi Suzuki; Japan
