= Gateball at the 2001 World Games =

- Venue: Akita Prefectural Central Park
- Dates: 18-19 August 2001
- Competitors: 41 from 5 (Note: In total, 6 teams across 5 nations competed. There were two Japanese teams - a 6-person national team from Kurodashō, Hyōgo, and the 7-person local team Akita Smile (秋田スマイル), representing Akita Prefecture.) nations

Gateball was contested as an invitational sport at the 2001 World Games between 18 and 19 August 2001, at the track and field venue in Akita Prefectural Central Park.

== Participating nations ==
- China (7)
- Chinese Taipei (8)
- Japan (13)
- South Korea (8)
- United States (5)

== Preliminary league ==
The preliminary league was played in a round-robin format.

Team	Wins	Losses	Points	Ranking
Japan	5	0	56	1st
Chinese Taipei	4	1	39	2nd
South Korea	2	3	-1	3rd
China	2	3	-23	4th
United States	1	4	-32	5th
Akita Prefecture	1	4	-39	6th

== Knockout stage ==
Semi-finals
Japan	12
China	6
Chinese Taipei	16
South Korea	5

Final
Japan	25
Chinese Taipei	7

Consolation match
China	18
South Korea	11

== Medalists ==
Event	Gold	Silver	Bronze
Gateball	Japan; Yasumasa Moriwaki; Satoshi Fujiwara; Akihiro Onishi; Wataru Fujiwara; Hirofumi Fujiwara; Kiyohiro Katsuoka	Chinese Taipei; Wang Ching Tai; Hsu Chiu Chuan; Chang Kuo Pao; Lee Pen Fong; Lee Pen Kan; Lin Ting Chang; Cheng Wei Pin; Lai Kuo Ying Hua	China; Zheng Farong; Chen Honggang; Li Jiaohuai; Li Jingjian; Gong Luping; Zhang Wei; Zhou Zheng
