= Boules sports at the 2001 World Games =

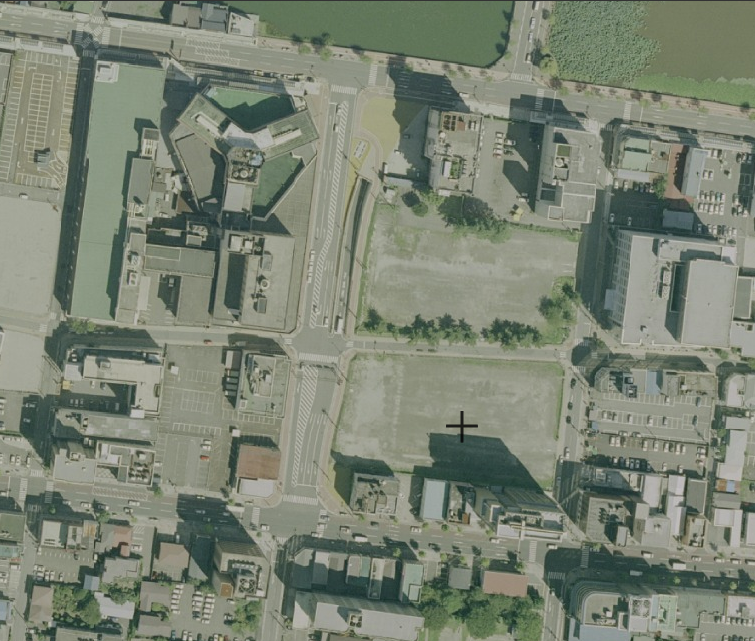
- Venue: World Games Plaza (39°43′1.6″N 140°07′20.2″E)
- Dates: 17–19 August 2001
- Competitors: 54 from 14 nations

The boules sports events at the 2001 World Games in Akita was played between 17 and 19 August. 54 competitors, from 14 nations, participated in the tournament. The boules sports competition took place at World Games Plaza.

== Participating nations ==
- Australia (2)
- Belgium (5)
- Canada (2)
- China (2)
- Croatia (4)
- Denmark (2)
- France (7)
- Italy (7)
- Japan (7)
- Madagascar (2)
- Slovenia (4)
- Spain (5)
- Tunisia (3)
- FR Yugoslavia (2)

== Medal table ==
Rank	Nation	Gold	Silver	Bronze	Total
1	France	2	0	0	2
2	Italy	1	2	0	3
3	Belgium	1	0	1	2
4	Spain	0	2	0	2
5	Slovenia	0	0	2	2
6	Madagascar	0	0	1	1
Totals (6 entries)		4	4	4	12

== Events ==
=== Men's events ===
Event	Gold	Silver	Bronze
Lyonnaise progressive doubles	France; Laurent Duverger; Sébastien Grail	Italy; Michele Giordanino; Marco Ziraldo	Slovenia; Gregor Košir; Zoran Rednak
Pétanque triples	Italy; Stefano Bruno; Fabio Dutto; Paolo Lerda	Spain; José Luis Delgado; José Joaquín Romero; Antonio López	Belgium; André Lozano; Michel Van Campenhout; Claudy Weibel

=== Women's events ===
Event	Gold	Silver	Bronze
Lyonnaise progressive doubles	France; Corine Maugiron; Valérie Maugiron	Italy; Ilenia Pasin; Laura Trova	Slovenia; Petra Pivk; Nina Sodec
Pétanque doubles	Belgium; Nancy Barzin; Linda Goblet	Spain; Inés Rosario; María Luisa Ruíz	Madagascar; Hanta Randriambahiny; Odile Razanamahefa
