= Artistic roller skating at the 2001 World Games =

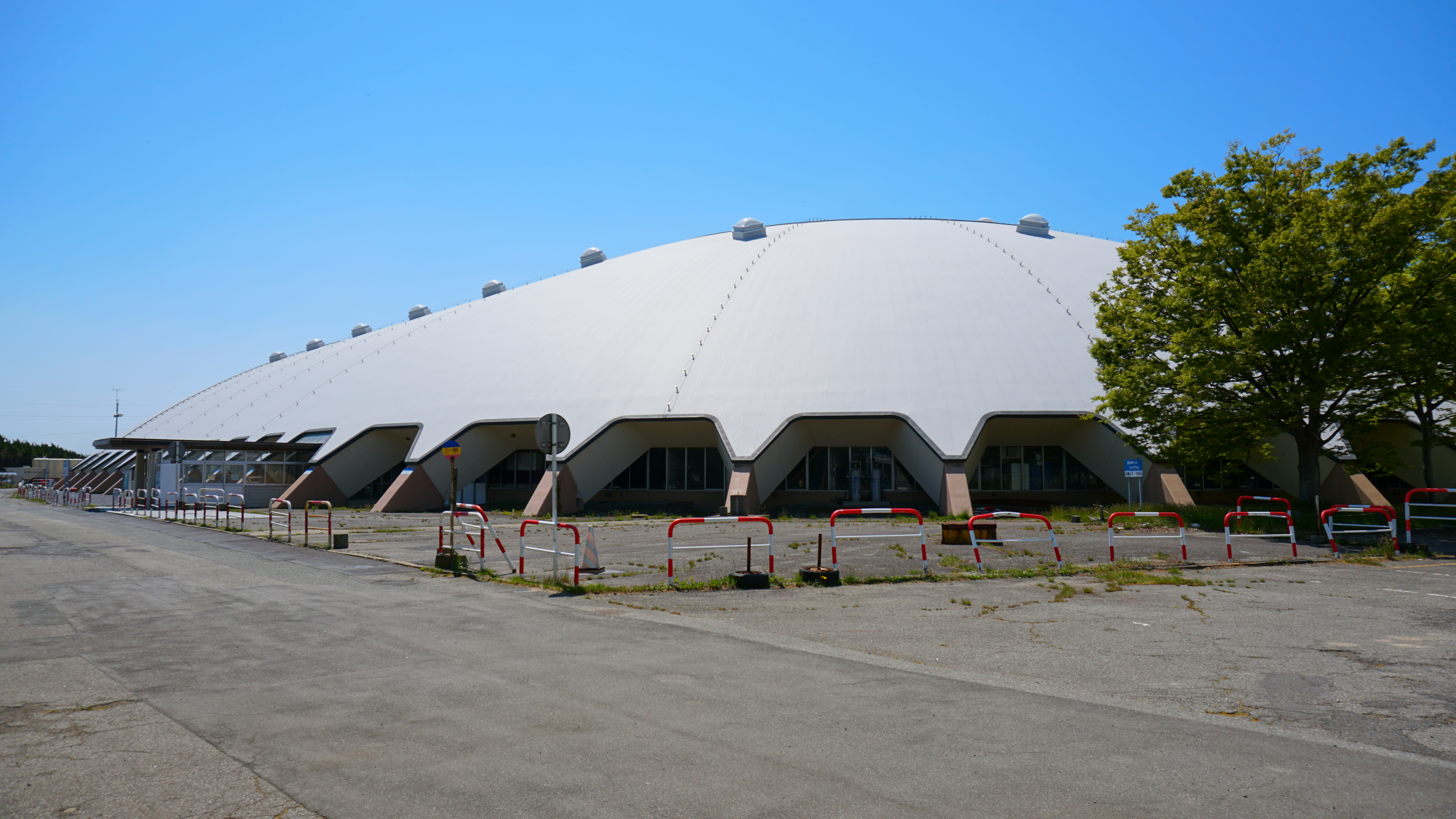
- Akita Prefectural Skating Rink
- Venue: Akita Prefectural Skating Rink
- Dates: 22–23 August 2001
- Competitors: 27 from 10 nations

The artistic roller skating events at the 2001 World Games in Akita was played between 22 and 23 August. 27 roller skaters, from 10 nations, participated in the tournament. The artistic roller skating competition took place at Akita Prefectural Skating Rink.

== Participating nations ==
- Argentina (4)
- Australia (2)
- Brazil (3)
- Chinese Taipei (2)
- Colombia (1)
- Germany (1)
- Great Britain (2)
- Italy (4)
- Japan (2)
- United States (6)

== Medal table ==
Rank	Nation	Gold	Silver	Bronze	Total
1	United States	2	2	0	4
2	Italy	2	1	0	3
3	Australia	0	1	0	1
4	Argentina	0	0	2	2
5	Brazil	0	0	1	1
5	Germany	0	0	1	1
Totals (6 entries)		4	4	4	12

== Events ==
Event	Gold	Silver	Bronze
Men's singles	Luca Lailai; Italy	Joshua Rhodes; United States	Daniel Arriola; Argentina
Women's singles	Heather Mulkey; United States	Erica Colaceci; Italy	Elke Dederichs; Germany
Dance	United States; Adam White; Melissa Quinn	Australia; Gawaine Davis; Ester Ambrus	Argentina; Gastón Passini; Analia Martínez
Pairs	Italy; Patrick Venerucci; Beatrice Palazzi Rossi	United States; Billy Crowder; Candice Heiden	Brazil; Max Santos; Luciana Roiha
