= David Félix =

French karateka (born 1971)

Medal record

Men's karate

Representing France

World Games
Gold medal – first place	2001 Akita	Kumite open

David Félix (born 18 March 1971 in Paris) is a French karateka who won multiple medals at karate's top competitions: the European Karate Championships and the World Karate Championships.

- Gold medalist at the 1998 World Karate Championships at men's kumite75kg
- Bronze medalist at the 2000 World Karate championships at men's kumite75kg
- Gold medalist at the 2001 European Karate Championships at men's kumite open
