= Bowling at the 2001 World Games =

- Venue: Utenayu Bowl (39°18′16.7″N 140°33′30.3″E)
- Dates: 21–23 August 2001
- Competitors: 48 from 23 nations

The bowling events at the 2001 World Games in Akita was played between 21 and 23 August. 48 competitors, from 23 nations, participated in the tournament. The bowling competition took place at Utenayu Bowl (台由ボウル) in Yokote.

== Participating nations ==
- Canada (2)
- Chinese Taipei (2)
- Colombia (2)
- Dominican Republic (2)
- Great Britain (4)
- Finland (2)
- France (2)
- Germany (2)
- Guatemala (2)
- Guam (2)
- Hong Kong (2)
- Japan (2)
- Malaysia (2)
- Netherlands (2)
- Norway (2)
- Peru (2)
- Philippines (2)
- Puerto Rico (2)
- San Marino (2)
- Singapore (2)
- South Korea (2)
- United States (2)
- Venezuela (2)

== Medal table ==
Rank	Nation	Gold	Silver	Bronze	Total
1	Germany	1	1	0	2
2	Great Britain	1	0	0	1
2	Guatemala	1	0	0	1
4	Netherlands	0	1	0	1
4	South Korea	0	1	0	1
6	Finland	0	0	2	2
7	Norway	0	0	1	1
Totals (7 entries)		3	3	3	9

== Events ==
Event	Gold	Silver	Bronze
Men's singles	Tobias Gäbler; Germany	Kim Kyung-min; South Korea	Tom Hahl; Finland
Women's singles	Sofía Rodríguez; Guatemala	Ross Greiner; Netherlands	Piritta Kantola; Finland
Mixed doubles	Great Britain; Steve Thornton; Kirsten Penny	Germany; Tobias Gäbler; Tanya Petty	Norway; Petter Hansen; Mette Hansen
