= Chad Hedrick =

American speed skater (born 1977)

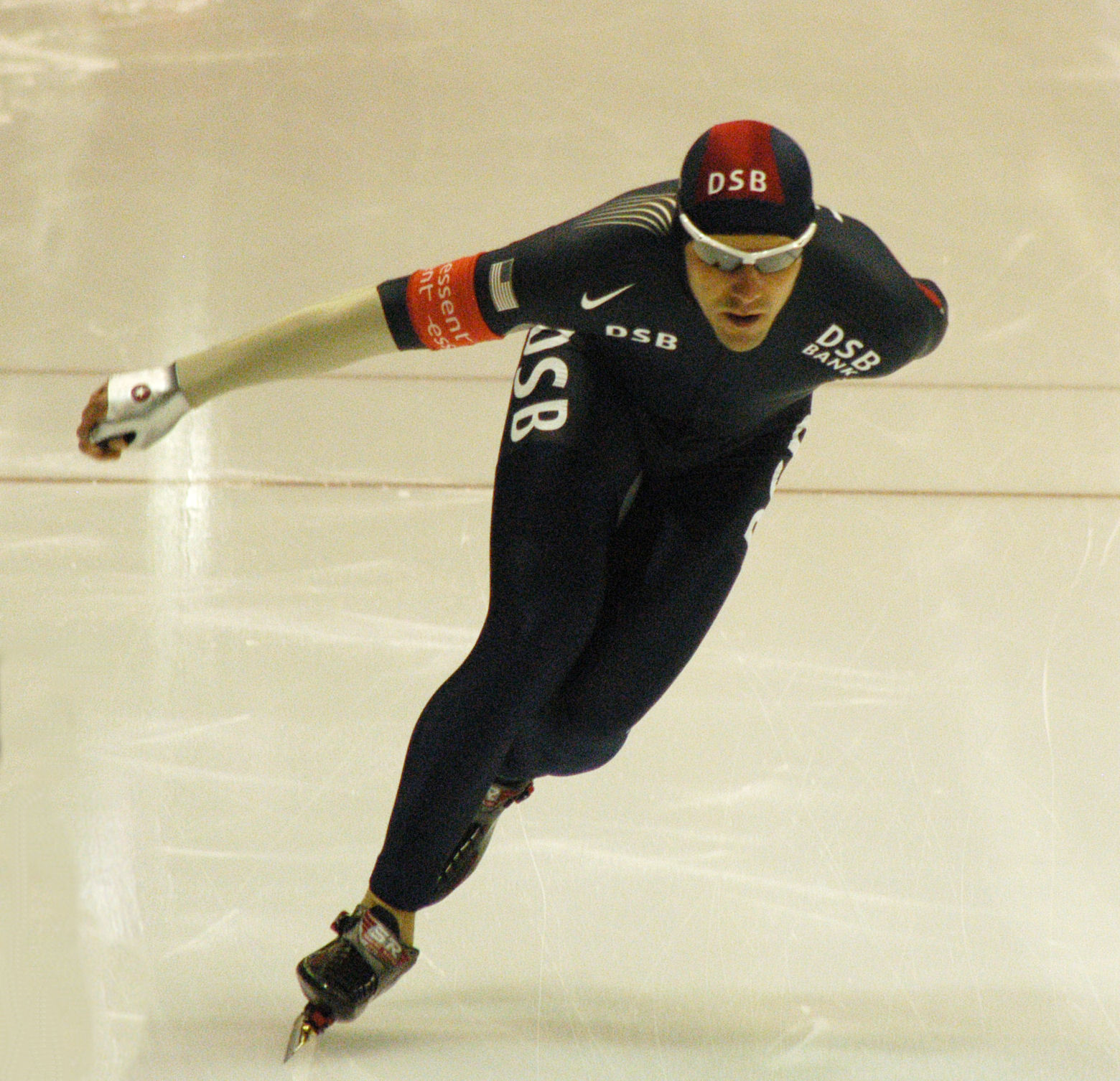
- Hedrick at a world cup speedskating event in Heerenveen, the Netherlands

Personal information
- Born: April 17, 1977 (age 49) Spring, Texas, U.S.
- Height: 5 ft 10 in (1.78 m)
- Weight: 172.0 lb (78.02 kg)
- Website: ChadHedrick.com (archive)

Sport
- Country: United States
- Sport: Long track speed skating Inline speed skating
- World Cup wins: 1500 m – Netherlands; 5000 m – Italy; 1500 m – USA; 5000 m – Canada
- World championship wins: 2004 overall

Achievements and titles
- Personal bests: 500 m: 35.52 (2009); 1000 m: 1:07.33 (2009); 1500 m: 1:42.14 (2009); 3000 m: 3:39.02 (2005); 5000 m: 6:09.68 (2005); 10 000 m: 12:55.11 (2005)
Medal record
Men's speed skating
Representing the United States
Olympic Games
Gold medal – first place	2006 Turin	5000 m
Silver medal – second place	2006 Turin	10000 m
Silver medal – second place	2010 Vancouver	Team pursuit
Bronze medal – third place	2006 Turin	1500 m
Bronze medal – third place	2010 Vancouver	1000 m
World Championships
Gold medal – first place	2004 Hamar	Allround
Gold medal – first place	2004 Seoul	5000 m
Gold medal – first place	2005 Inzell	5000 m
Silver medal – second place	2005 Moscow	Allround
Bronze medal – third place	2004 Seoul	10000 m
Bronze medal – third place	2005 Inzell	10000 m
World Games
Gold medal – first place	2001 Akito	500 m sprint
Gold medal – first place	2001 Akito	10000 m points
Gold medal – first place	2001 Akito	15,000 m points elimination
Bronze medal – third place	2001 Akito	300 m time trial

Chad Hedrick (born April 17, 1977) is an American inline speed skater and ice speed skater. He was born in Spring, Texas.

Hedrick revolutionized the inline speed skating world with his unique technique, called the double push, or DP. During his career he won 93 national championships and 50 world championships, as well as having a brand of inline skating wheels named after him.

== Speed skating ==
After winning his 50th World Championship, in Ostend, Belgium, in 2002, he switched to ice speed skating after watching, on a television in a Las Vegas casino in 2002, fellow inline skater Derek Parra win a medal at the Salt Lake City Winter Olympics. In February 2004, a year and a half after he made his switch, Hedrick won the 2004 World Allround Speed Skating Championships, knocking more than a point off the world record points, reducing it to 150.478. On March 12, 2004, Hedrick won the gold medal in the 5,000 meters during the 2004 World Single Distance Championships, which were held Seoul, South Korea. In 2005 he successfully defended his 5,000 m world title in Inzell, Germany. At the 2005 World Allround Speed Skating Championships he lost his title to Shani Davis. Hedrick has set six world records in speed skating, but these have later been broken by others. As of 2021, he was 4th in the unofficial world ranking, the Adelskalender after having led the rankings from November 2005–7.

=== 2006 Winter Olympic Games ===
The Texan raised the stakes for the Winter Olympics 2006 in Turin by proclaiming that he would equal Eric Heiden's record of five gold medals. On February 11, 2006, Hedrick won his only gold medal at this Olympics at the 5,000 m beating Sven Kramer of the Netherlands who claimed a silver medal.

Hedrick caused controversy when he insisted that Shani Davis, fellow American speed skater in the 1,000 m race, should have participated in the men's pursuit, stating, "I don't see what his logic is. We can't be beat if he skates. It's his decision. I'm not going to get in the middle of it. I would like him to be in the pursuit, but am I going to beg him? No." Five-time gold medalist and Olympic-team physician, Eric Heiden, has publicly written that Davis made the right choice in not participating in the team pursuit and thereby not jeopardizing his chances at a gold medal in his best event, the 1,000 meter race. Davis eventually won the gold medal in the 1000 m race, while Hedrick finished sixth.

Hedrick added a silver medal in the 10,000 m to his Olympic tally along with a bronze medal in the 1,500 m. With three medals, Hedrick became only the third American ever to win three speed skating medals in a single Winter Olympics winning a medal in each color (gold, silver, and bronze).

=== Post-Torino career ===
On March 5, 2006, Hedrick won a 1500 m race in the Netherlands and captured the 2006 World Cup title in the event. Two weeks later, Hedrick participated in the World Allround Championships in Calgary, aiming to take back the title he lost to Davis in 2005. On the fourth and final distance, the 10,000 meter, Hedrick needed to beat Davis by 8.32 seconds, but made a crucial mistake midway through the race; he turned into the inner lane instead of his scheduled outer, and though he realised his mistake quickly, he was motioned off some laps later.

=== 2010 Winter Olympic Games ===
Hedrick qualified for the 1000 m, 1500 m, 5000 m, and the long-track team pursuit in the 21st Winter Olympiad held in Vancouver. Hedrick lost to Håvard Bøkko in the final pair of the 5000 m event. He would ultimately finish 10 places behind the winner, Dutchman Sven Kramer, in 11th place. Hedrick skated a 1:09.32 in the 1000 m which was good for the bronze behind Davis and South Korea's Mo Tae-bum. Hedrick was the leader of the team that won a surprising silver medal in team pursuit with an upset of the heavily favored Netherlands team in the semifinals bringing Hedrick's Olympic career to an end with a total of five medals with each one in a different event.

== Personal bests ==
Personal records
Men's speed skating
Event	Result	Date	Location	Notes
500 m	35.52	2009-12-26	Salt Lake City	
1000 m	1:07.33	2009-12-13	Salt Lake City	
1500 m	1:42.14	2009-12-04	Calgary	
3000 m	3:39.02	2005-03-10	Calgary	
5000 m	6:09.68	2005-11-13	Calgary	American record
10000 m	12:55.11	2005-12-31	Salt Lake City	American record
Big combination	148.799	2006-01-22	Calgary	

Source: speedskatingbase.eu & SpeedskatingResults.com

== World ice speedskating records ==
Hedrick has so far skated six world records on ice skates

Event	Time	Date	Venue
Big combination	150.478	February 8, 2004	(Norway) Hamar
3000 m	3.39,02	March 10, 2005	(Canada) Calgary
5000 m	6.09,68	November 13, 2005	(Canada) Calgary
1500 m	1.42,78	November 18, 2005	(United States) Salt Lake City
10,000 m	12.55,11	December 31, 2005	(United States) Salt Lake City
Big combination	148.799	January 22, 2006	(Canada) Calgary

Source: SpeedSkatingStats.com

== World Titles Inline Speed Skating ==
Hedrick has won the following world titles in inline speed skating:

Year	Number	Track	Road
1994	1	1500 m	
1995	6	10.000 m 1500 m 10.000 m	20.000 m 10.000 m Marathon
1996	7	10.000 m 5000 m 20.000 m 10.000 m Relay	1500m 10.000; 20.000 m
1997	7	10.000 m 1500 m 20.000 m 10.000 m Relay	20.000 m 10.000 m 1500 m
1998	7	1500 m 10000 m 15000 m 20000 m 10.000 m Relay	1500 m 15000 m
1999	9	1000 m 10000 m 15000 m 20000 m 10.000 m Relay	1000 m 10.000 m 20.000 m
2000	5	10.000 m 20.000 m 10.000 m Relay	10.000 m 15.000 m
2001	7	1000 m 10.000 m 15000 m 10000 m Relay	20000 m 15.000 m 10000 m
2002	2	1000 m 20.000 m	
Total	50		

== U.S. and world roller speed skating records ==
- National roller skating record in the 3,000 meters relay race (1993)
- National inline skating record in the 5,000 meters relay race (1998)
- National inline skating record in the 3,000 meters male-female relay race (1998)
- National inline skating record in the 1,500 meters race (1996)
- National outdoor track record in the 1,000 and 1,500 meters races (1999 and 1998 respectively)
- National outdoor track record in the 15,000 meters race (1998)
- National outdoor road record in the 500 and 1,000 meters races (2001)
- National outdoor road record in the 1,500 meters race (1998)
- National outdoor road record in the 10,000 meters race (2001)
- World outdoor road record in the 1,500 meters race (1999)
- World outdoor road record in the 10,000 meters race (1996)
- World outdoor road record in the 15,000 meters race (2000)
- Course Record - NorthShore Inline Marathon (1998)

== Personal life ==
On June 7, 2008, Hedrick and Lynsey Elizabeth Adams were married in Houston, Texas. Their wedding was featured on the Style Network reality show Whose Wedding Is It Anyway? They had their first daughter in 2009, a second daughter in 2010, and a son in 2014. Hedrick currently works as a licensed realtor.

Awards and achievements
Preceded by (Germany) Anni Friesinger	Oscar Mathisen Award; 2004	Succeeded by (United States) Shani Davis
