= Yusuke Inokoshi =

Japanese karateka

- Born: 20 July 1980 (age 46); Tochigi Prefecture, Japan
- Style: Shotokan Karate
- Teacher: Masaaki Ueki
- Rank: 4th Dan karate (JKA)

Yusuke Inokoshi (Inokoshi Yusuke; born 20 July 1980) is a Japanese instructor of Shotokan karate. He has won the JKA All-Japan championships for kumite. He is currently an instructor of the Japan Karate Association.

== Biography ==
Yusuke Inokoshi was born in Tochigi Prefecture, Japan on 20 July 1980. His karate training began during his 6 years old and he studied at Komazawa University.

== Competition ==
Yusuke Inokoshi has had considerable success in karate competition.

=== Major Tournament Success ===
- 52nd JKA All Japan Karate Championship (2009) – 1st Place Kumite
- 51st JKA All Japan Karate Championship (2008) – 2nd Place Kumite
