= United States at the World Games =

- IOC code: USA
- Medals Ranked 3rd: Gold 172 Silver 157 Bronze 126 Total 455

World Games appearances (overview)
- 1981; 1985; 1989; 1993; 1997; 2001; 2005; 2009; 2013; 2017; 2022; 2025

The United States has participated in the World Games beginning with the inaugural event in 1981. The United States sits third all-time in the medal count. The United States most recently hosted the World Games in 2022 in Birmingham, Alabama.

== Medal table ==
Leading in that sport

Games	Gold	Silver	Bronze	Total
(United States) 1981 Santa Clara	38	37	25	100
(United Kingdom) 1985 London	18	16	18	52
(Germany) 1989 Karlsruhe	8	10	12	30
(Netherlands) 1993 Den Haag	11	12	12	35
(Finland) 1997 Lahti	17	18	11	46
(Japan) 2001 Akita	14	8	8	30
(Germany) 2005 Duisburg	7	7	9	23
(Chinese Taipei) 2009 Kaohsiung	13	8	5	26
(Colombia) 2013 Cali	11	4	4	19
(Poland) 2017 Wroclaw	7	10	5	22
(United States) 2022 Birmingham	17	17	10	44
(China) 2025 Chengdu	11	10	7	28
Totals (12 entries)	172	157	126	455
