= Italy at the World Games =

Italy at the World Games
IOC code: ITA
NOC: CONI
World Games history
- 1981
- 1985
- 1988
- 1993
- 1997
  2001
- 2005
- 2009
- 2013
- 2017

Italy has sent delegations to the World Games since the first games in 1981.

== Medal tables ==
Italy than to have won on three occasions the medal of the Games, he finished 4 more times on the podium and leads also to the all-time medals.

Leading in that sport

Games	Gold	Silver	Bronze	Total
(United States) 1981 Santa Clara	7	11	16	34
(United Kingdom) 1985 London	26	29	22	77
(Germany) 1989 Karlsruhe	22	14	14	50
(Netherlands) 1993 Den Haag	14	19	6	39
(Finland) 1997 Lahti	12	12	15	39
(Japan) 2001 Akita	10	11	9	30
(Germany) 2005 Duisburg	13	12	16	41
(Chinese Taipei) 2009 Kaohsiung	16	12	13	41
(Colombia) 2013 Cali	18	13	18	49
(Poland) 2017 Wroclaw	14	10	10	34
(United States) 2022 Birmingham	13	24	12	49
Totals (11 entries)	165	167	151	483

== See also ==
- Italy at the Olympics
- Italy at the Paralympics
- World Games all time medal table
