= Shane Dobbin =

New Zealand speed skater

Personal information
- Nationality: New Zealander
- Born: 22 January 1980 (age 46) Palmerston North, New Zealand
- Height: 6 ft 0 in (183 cm)
- Weight: 159 lb (72 kg)

Sport
- Country: New Zealand
- Sport: Speed skating
Medal record
World Single Distance Championships
Silver medal – second place	2017 Gangneung	Team pursuit
The World Games
Silver medal – second place	2005 Duisburg	Track 5000 m E
Silver medal – second place	2001 Akita	Track 10000 m point race

Shane Dobbin (born 22 January 1980) is a New Zealand inline skater and speed skater. Before competing on ice, he won a silver medal at The World Games 2001 in Akita and repeated this success at The World Games 2005 in Duisburg. He was New Zealand's only competitor in speed skating at the 2010 Winter Olympics, finishing 17th in the men's 5000 m. He was born in Palmerston North.

Dobbin was the first confirmed selection for the New Zealand team to the 2014 Winter Olympics. He was also named the New Zealand flagbearer at the 2014 Winter Olympics opening ceremony. He finished 14th in the men's 5000 speed skating.
