= Akita Prefectural Skating Rink =

Indoor speed skating oval in Akita, Japan

Coordinates: 39°43′33.6″N 140°04′41.9″E

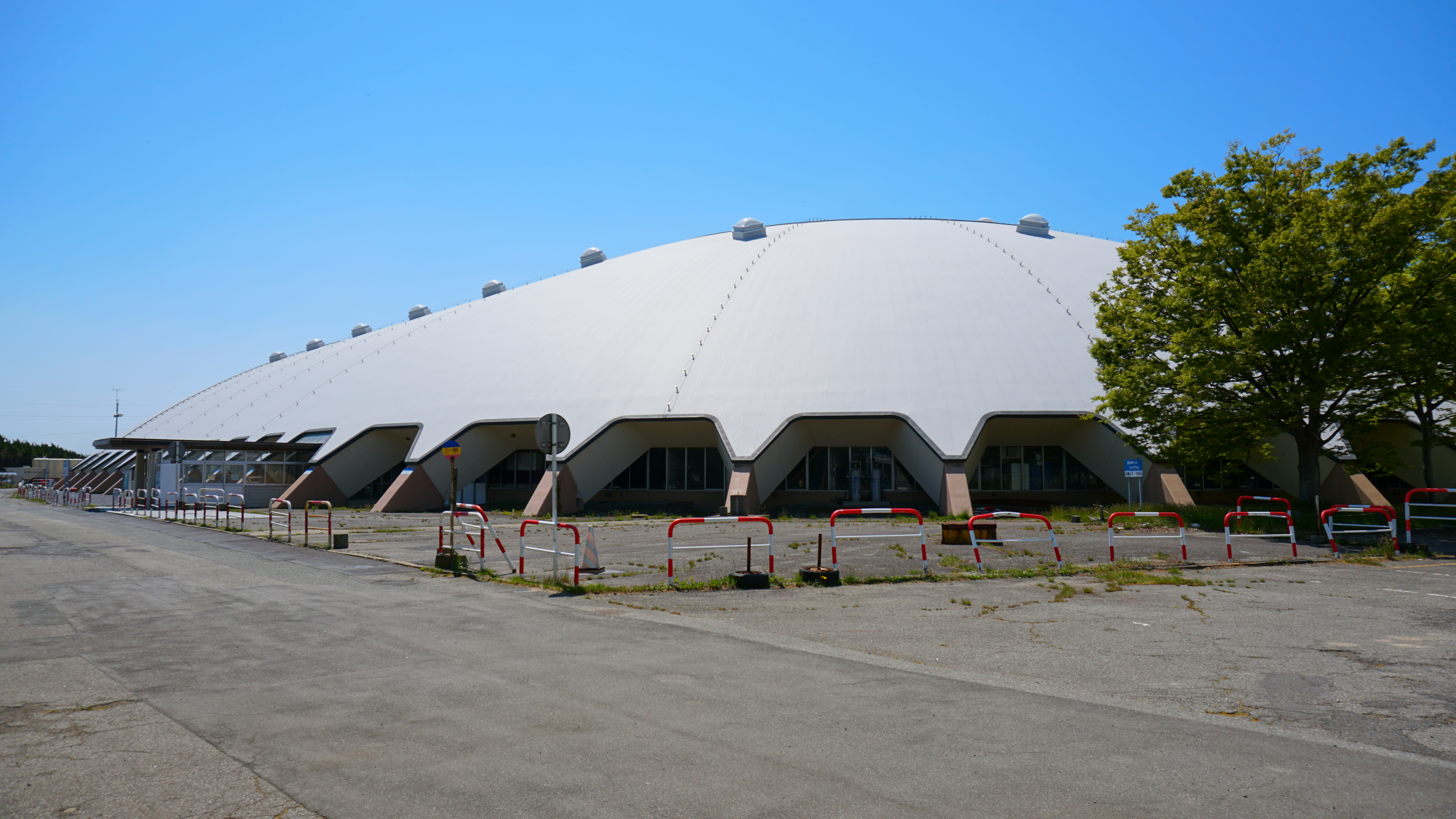
- Interactive map of Akita Prefectural Skating Rink
- Location: Akita, Akita, Japan
- Owner: Akita Prefecture
- Operator: Akita Prefecture
- Acreage: 13,954 m^{2}

Construction
- Opened: November 11, 1971
- Architect: Kume Sekkei

Tenant
- Akita Speed Skate Club

Akita Prefectural Skating Rink (秋田県立スケート場, Akita Kenritsu Sukeitojo) is an indoor speed skating oval located in Akita, Akita, Japan. The first indoor skating rink in Akita Prefecture was located near Prefectural Gymnasium.

== Rinks ==
- Speed skate rink: 333.3m × 13m, 4,367.74 m^{2}
- Ice hockey rink: 60m × 30m, 1,789 m^{2}

== Events ==
- National Sports Festival of Japan (1979)
- 2001 World Games - Artistic roller skating, Roller hockey, Inline speed skating

== Track records ==
- 500 m (m): Shun Ono (37,99)
- 500 m (w): Shoko Fusano (42,18)
- 1000 m (m): Jun Yuda (1.16,79)
- 1000 m (w): Shoko Fusano (1.27,23)
- 1500 m (m): Takayuki Sato (2.01,95)
- 1500 m (w): Kanako Iijima (2.11,77)
- 3000 m (m): Satoshi Obara (4.13,43)
- 3000 m (w): Kanako Iijima (4.39,86)
- 5000 m (m): Yasuhiro Shimizu (7.20,30)

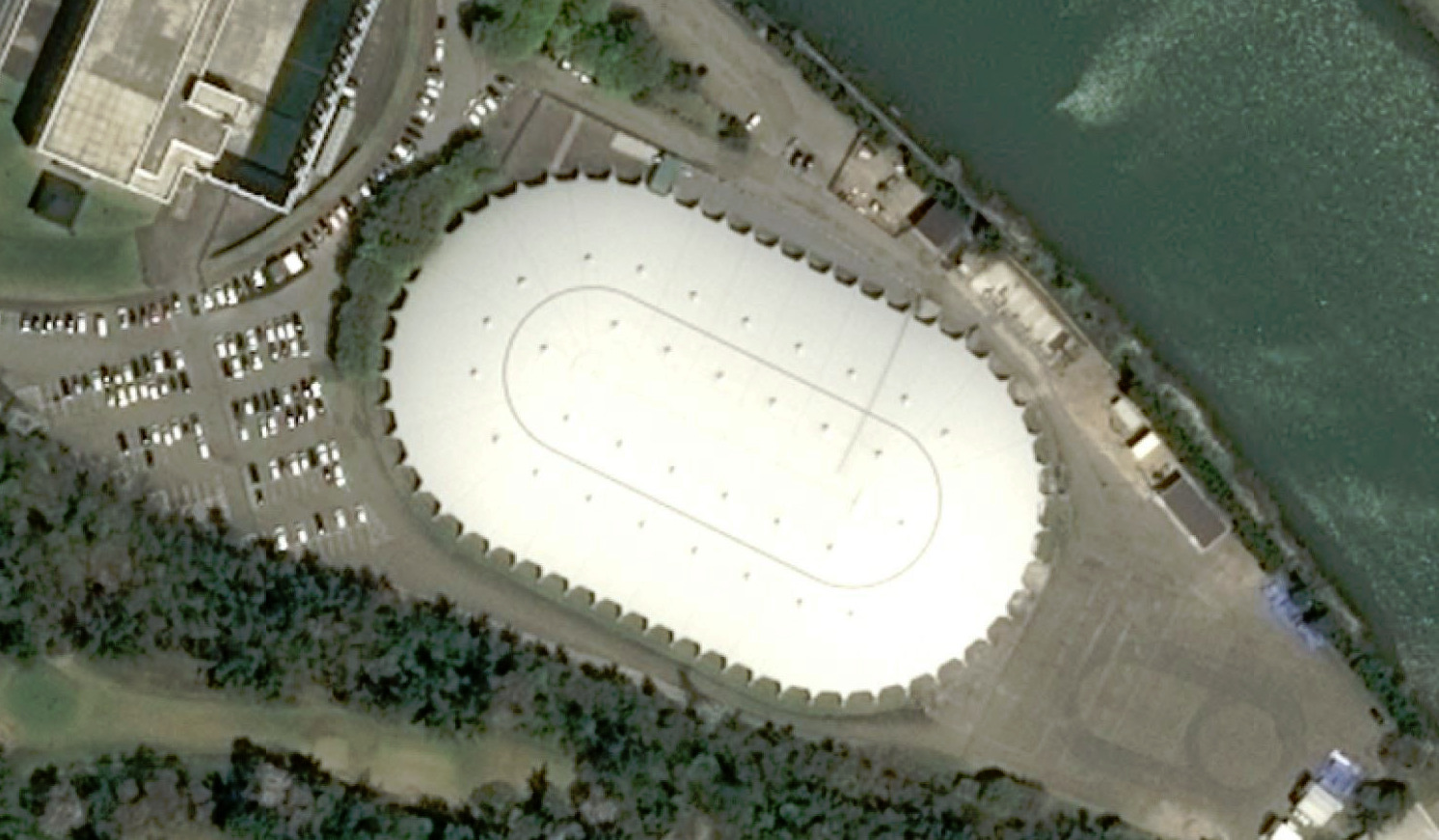
Satellite view

== Location map ==
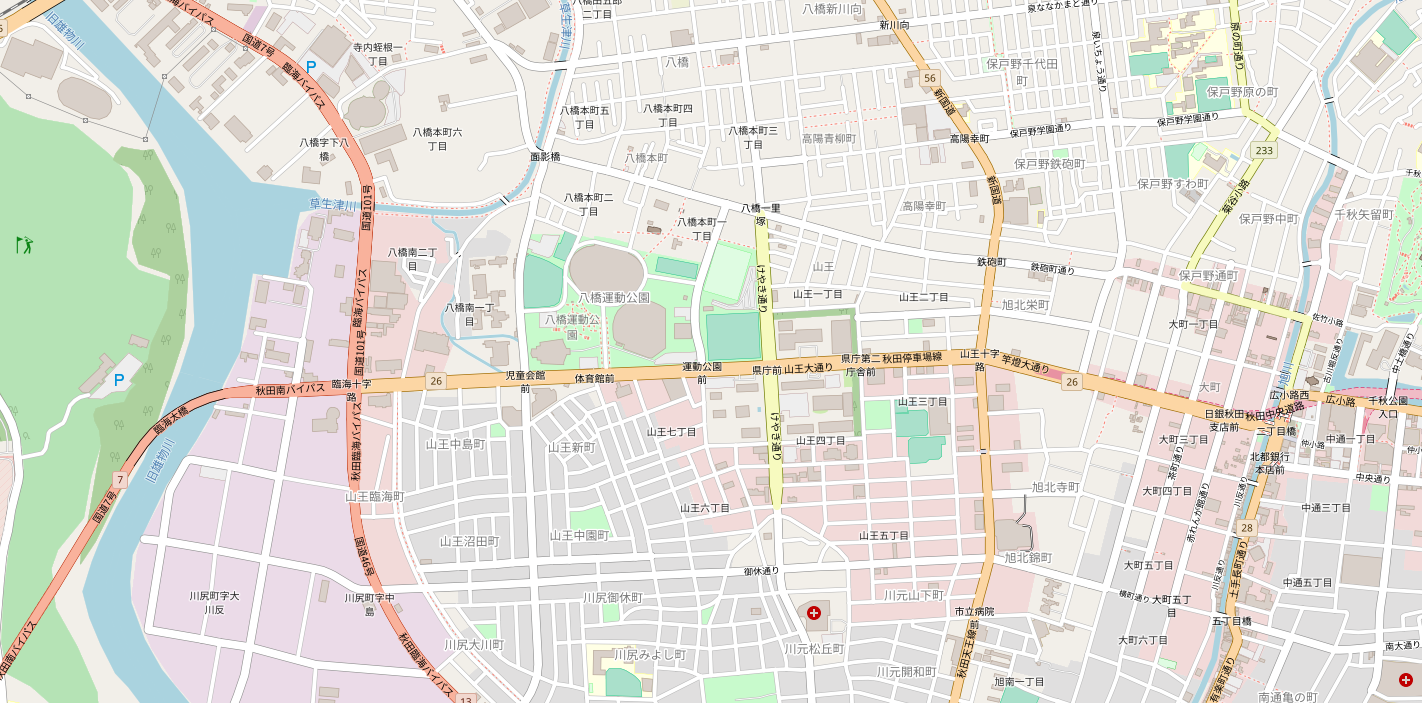
Akita Prefectural Skating Rink (Akita, Akita)
