= 2001 World Games =

Multi-sport event in Akita, Japan

World Games VI VIワールドゲームズ
- Host city: Akita, Japan
- Nations: 92
- Athletes: 3,200
- Events: 140 in 27 sports
- Opening: 16 August 2001
- Closing: 26 August 2001
- Opened by: Atsuko Toyama; Minister of Education, Culture, Sports, Science and Technology of Japan
- Athlete's Oath: Doumu Narita and Mero Narita
- Main venue: Akita Yabase Athletics Stadium

The 2001 World Games (Japanese: 2001年ワールドゲームズ, romanized: 2001-Nen wārudogēmuzu), the sixth World Games, were an international multi-sport event held in Akita, Japan.

== Titles ==
140 titles (invitational sports not included) were awarded in the following official sports. There were five invitational sports in this edition.

=== Sports ===
The 2001 World Games programme featured 27 official sports and 4 invitational sports. (Aikido was deemed a demonstration sport; no medal events were held.) The numbers in parentheses indicate the number of medal events that were contested in each sports discipline.

- Acrobatic gymnastics (5)
- Aerobic gymnastics (4)
- Artistic roller skating (4)
- Beach handball (2) ^{I}
- Bodybuilding (7)
- Boules sports (4)
- Bowling (3)
- Casting (6)
- Cue sports (4)
- Dancesport (2)
- Field archery (6)
- Finswimming (10)
- Fistball (1)
- Flying disc (3)
- Gateball (1) ^{I}
- Inline speed skating (10)
- Ju-jitsu (9)
- Karate (12)
- Korfball (1)
- Lifesaving (16)
- Orienteering (3)
- Parachuting (4)
- Powerlifting (6)
- Rhythmic gymnastics (4)
- Roller hockey (1)
- Rugby sevens (1)
- Sumo (8) ^{I}
- Trampoline gymnastics (6)
- Tug of war (4) ^{I(W)}
- Water skiing (6)

Notes
I: Invitational sports, selected by the host city

=== Participating nations ===
Participating National Olympic Committees
- Argentina
- Australia
- Austria
- Belarus
- Belgium
- Botswana
- Brazil
- Bulgaria
- Canada
- Chile
- China
- Colombia
- Croatia
- Cyprus
- Czech Republic
- Denmark
- Ecuador
- Egypt
- Estonia (11)
- Fiji
- Finland
- France
- Georgia
- Germany
- Great Britain
- Greece
- Guam
- Hong Kong
- Hungary
- Ireland
- Israel
- Italy
- Japan (host)
- Kazakhstan
- Latvia
- Lithuania
- Luxembourg
- Macau (3)
- Madagascar
- Malaysia
- Mexico
- Mongolia
- Netherlands
- New Zealand
- Norway
- Pakistan
- Peru
- Philippines
- Poland
- Portugal
- Romania
- Russia
- Senegal
- Serbia
- Singapore
- Slovakia
- Slovenia
- San Marino
- South Africa
- South Korea
- Spain
- Sri Lanka
- Sweden
- Switzerland
- FR Yugoslavia
- Chinese Taipei
- Thailand
- Tonga (4)
- Tunisia
- Turkey
- Ukraine
- United States
- Uruguay
- Venezuela
- Vietnam

== Medal count ==
=== Official sports ===
The results from the 2001 World Games are from the archived website of the Akita, Japan, organizing committee. The medal tally during the sixth World Games is as follows. Russia finished at the top of the final medal table.

* Host nation (Japan)

Rank	Nation	Gold	Silver	Bronze	Total
1	Russia (RUS)	24	15	5	44
2	United States (USA)	15	8	8	31
3	France (FRA)	12	5	6	23
4	Germany (GER)	10	10	15	35
5	Australia (AUS)	10	10	3	23
6	Italy (ITA)	9	11	8	28
7	Japan (JPN)*	9	6	10	25
8	Spain (ESP)	5	4	1	10
9	Great Britain (GBR) (Note: England, Scotland and Northern Ireland competed separately in tug-of-war. England won the gold medal in the indoor 600kg tug of war, and Scotland won the silver medal. England and Wales competed separately in singles and doubles bowling. The pair from England won the gold medal in mixed doubles bowling.)	4	7	11	22
10	Netherlands (NED)	4	3	3	10
11	South Africa (RSA)	3	7	4	14
12	Colombia (COL)	3	5	5	13
13	Belgium (BEL)	3	4	4	11
14	Chinese Taipei (TPE)	3	3	5	11
15	China (CHN)	2	6	5	13
16	Sweden (SWE)	2	4	9	15
17	Norway (NOR)	2	2	3	7
18	Bulgaria (BUL)	2	1	2	5
19	Denmark (DEN)	2	1	1	4
20	Austria (AUT)	1	4	2	7
21	New Zealand (NZL)	1	2	1	4
22	Greece (GRE)	1	2	0	3
23	Slovenia (SLO)	1	1	3	5
24	Lithuania (LTU)	1	1	1	3
24	Portugal (POR)	1	1	1	3
24	Slovakia (SVK)	1	1	1	3
27	Canada (CAN)	1	1	0	2
27	Romania (ROM)	1	1	0	2
29	Finland (FIN)	1	0	4	5
30	Egypt (EGY)	1	0	1	2
30	Poland (POL)	1	0	1	2
32	Fiji (FIJ)	1	0	0	1
32	Guatemala (GUA)	1	0	0	1
32	Kazakhstan (KAZ)	1	0	0	1
32	Ukraine (UKR)	1	0	0	1
36	Brazil (BRA)	0	3	1	4
37	Venezuela (VEN)	0	2	1	3
38	South Korea (KOR)	0	2	0	2
38	Switzerland (SUI)	0	2	0	2
40	Belarus (BLR)	0	1	7	8
41	Czech Republic (CZE)	0	1	2	3
42	Hungary (HUN)	0	1	0	1
42	Luxembourg (LUX)	0	1	0	1
42	Philippines (PHI)	0	1	0	1
45	Argentina (ARG)	0	0	2	2
46	Bosnia and Herzegovina (BIH)	0	0	1	1
46	Madagascar (MAD)	0	0	1	1
46	Pakistan (PAK)	0	0	1	1
46	Yugoslavia (YUG)	0	0	1	1
Totals (49 entries)		140	140	140	420

=== Invitational sports ===
* Host nation (Japan)

Rank	Nation	Gold	Silver	Bronze	Total
1	Japan (JPN)*	5	4	2	11
2	Germany (GER)	2	4	1	7
3	Russia (RUS)	2	0	3	5
4	Spain (ESP)	1	1	0	2
5	Netherlands (NED)	1	0	1	2
6	Belarus (BLR)	1	0	0	1
6	Ukraine (UKR)	1	0	0	1
8	Estonia (EST)	0	2	0	2
9	Mongolia (MGL)	0	1	1	2
10	Chinese Taipei (TPE)	0	1	0	1
11	Brazil (BRA)	0	0	2	2
12	China (CHN)	0	0	1	1
12	Czech Republic (CZE)	0	0	1	1
12	United States (USA)	0	0	1	1
Totals (14 entries)		13	13	13	39
