= Gymnastics at the World Games =

Gymnastics has been part of all World Games. Among the disciplines, there are rhythmic gymnastics, trampolining and tumbling as well as acrobatics and aerobics. Artistic gymnastics are not contested at the World Games because all of its disciplines have always been Olympic sports.

== Individual rhythmic gymnastics ==
=== Women ===
==== Rope ====
Games	Gold	Silver	Bronze
2001 Akita	Irina Tchachina (RUS)	Laysan Utiasheva (RUS)	Elena Tkachenko (BLR)
2005 Duisburg	Anna Bessonova (UKR)	Vera Sessina (RUS)	Natalia Godunko (UKR)
2009 Kaohsiung	Evgenia Kanaeva (RUS)	Anna Bessonova (UKR)	Olga Kapranova (RUS)

==== Hoop ====
Games	Gold	Silver	Bronze
2001 Akita	Irina Tchachina (RUS)	Laysan Utiasheva (RUS)	Elena Tkachenko (BLR)
2009 Kaohsiung	Evgenia Kanaeva (RUS)	Olga Kapranova (RUS)	Sylvia Miteva (BUL)
2013 Cali	Ganna Rizatdinova (UKR)	Melitina Staniouta (BLR)	Elizaveta Nazarenkova (RUS)
2017 Wroclaw	Arina Averina (RUS)	Dina Averina (RUS)	Linoy Ashram (ISR)
2022 Birmingham	Boryana Kaleyn (BUL)	Sofia Raffaeli (ITA)	Fanni Pigniczki (HUN)

==== Ball ====
Games	Gold	Silver	Bronze
2001 Akita	Irina Tchachina (RUS)	Laysan Utiasheva (RUS)	Elena Tkachenko (BLR)
2005 Duisburg	Olga Kapranova (RUS)	Anna Bessonova (UKR)	Vera Sessina (RUS)
2009 Kaohsiung	Evgenia Kanaeva (RUS)	Anna Bessonova (UKR)	Melitina Staniouta (BLR)
2013 Cali	Melitina Staniouta (BLR)	Ganna Rizatdinova (UKR)	Alina Maksymenko (UKR)
2017 Wroclaw	Arina Averina (RUS)	Dina Averina (RUS)	Katsiaryna Halkina (BLR)
2022 Birmingham	Daria Atamanov (ISR)	Sofia Raffaeli (ITA)	Fanni Pigniczki (HUN)

==== Clubs ====
Games	Gold	Silver	Bronze
2001 Akita	Irina Tchachina (RUS)	Laysan Utiasheva (RUS)	Elena Tkachenko (BLR)
2005 Duisburg	Olga Kapranova (RUS)	Aliya Yussupova (KAZ)	Natalia Godunko (UKR)
2013 Cali	Melitina Staniouta (BLR)	Ganna Rizatdinova (UKR)	Alina Maksymenko (UKR)
2017 Wroclaw	Dina Averina (RUS)	Linoy Ashram (ISR)	Arina Averina (RUS)
2022 Birmingham	Sofia Raffaeli (ITA)	Daria Atamanov (ISR)	Ekaterina Vedeneeva (SLO)

==== Ribbon ====
Games	Gold	Silver	Bronze
2005 Duisburg	Vera Sessina (RUS)	Natalia Godunko (UKR)	Anna Bessonova (UKR)
2009 Kaohsiung	Evgenia Kanaeva (RUS)	Anna Bessonova (UKR)	Aliya Garayeva (AZE)
2013 Cali	Event cancelled		
2017 Wroclaw	Arina Averina (RUS)	Dina Averina (RUS)	Katsiaryna Halkina (BLR)
2022 Birmingham	Daria Atamanov (ISR)	Boryana Kaleyn (BUL)	Viktoriia Onopriienko (UKR)

== Acrobatic gymnastics ==
=== Men ===
==== Pairs ====
Games	Gold	Silver	Bronze
1993 The Hague	China (CHN); Chen Yun; Chen Baohuang Russia (RUS); Igor Striyanov; Vladimir Lebedov	None awarded	Bulgaria (BUL); Vladimir Vladev; Rumen Latchkov
1997 Lahti	China (CHN); Song Min; Li Renjie	Great Britain (GBR); Martyn Smith; Mark Flores	Poland (POL); Dariusz Nowak; Marcin Drabicki
2001 Akita	China (CHN); Song Min; Li Renjie	Russia (RUS); Aleksandr Privalov; Ivan Poletayev	Belarus (BLR); Aleksey Liubezny; Anatoliy Baravikov
2005 Duisburg	Russia (RUS); Ervin Mednikov; Aleksey Mochechkin	Ukraine (UKR); Mykola Shcherbak; Serhiy Popov	Great Britain (GBR); Mark Fyson; Chris Jones
2009 Kaohsiung	Ukraine (UKR); Mykola Shcherbak; Serhiy Popov	Russia (RUS); Alexei Dudchenko; Konstantin Pilipchuk	Great Britain (GBR); Douglas Fordyce; Edward Upcott
2013 Cali	Russia (RUS); Konstantin Pilipchuk; Alexei Dudchenko	Great Britain (GBR); Alex Houston; Timothy Ritchard	Belarus (BLR); Ruslan Fedchenko; Yauheni Kalachou
2017 Wroclaw	Germany (GER); Tim Sebastian; Michael Kraft	Russia (RUS); Igor Mishev; Nikolay Surpunov	Belgium (BEL); Kilian Goffaux; Robin Casse
2022 Birmingham	Ukraine (UKR); Bohdan Pohranychnyi; Danylo Stetsiuk	United States (USA); Braiden McDougall; Angel Felix	Kazakhstan (KAZ); Daniyel Dil; Vadim Shulyar

==== Pairs, Balance Routine ====
Games	Gold	Silver	Bronze
1993 The Hague	Russia (RUS); Igor Striyanov; Vladimir Lebedov	China (CHN); Chen Yun; Chen Baohuang	Bulgaria (BUL); Vladimir Vladev; Rumen Latchkov
1997 Lahti	China (CHN); Song Min; Li Renjie	Great Britain (GBR); Martyn Smith; Mark Flores	Russia (RUS); Alexandrer Ilienko; Pavel Bereshnoi

==== Pairs, Tempo Routine ====
Games	Gold	Silver	Bronze
1993 The Hague	China (CHN); Chen Yun; Chen Baohuang	Russia (RUS); Igor Striyanov; Vladimir Lebedov	Bulgaria (BUL); Vladimir Vladev; Rumen Latchkov
1997 Lahti	China (CHN); Song Min; Li Renjie Ukraine (UKR); Igor Kozhin; Aleksandr Vologdin	None awarded	Great Britain (GBR); Martyn Smith; Mark Flores

==== Groups ====
Games	Gold	Silver	Bronze
1993 The Hague	Bulgaria (BUL); Stefan Nikolov; Theodor Georgiev; Pavlin Nikolov; Julian Vassilev	China (CHN); Zhu Senchao; Liu Ruinxin; Lu Weiping; Yao Yingen	France (FRA); René Montaudoin; Thierry Maussier; Hugo Chal de Beauvais; Fabrice Berthet
1997 Lahti	Russia (RUS); Denys Pirogov; Maksim Vlasov; Aleksandr Maikrov; Oleg Ivanov	Ukraine (UKR); Andrey Safonov; Yuriy Zaveryukha; Sergiy Pavlov; Dmitriy Bain	China (CHN); Wu Weihuan; Huang Linseng; Chen Wuhua; Jiang Jianfen
2001 Akita	Russia (RUS); Aleksey Shcherbakov; Vadim Galkin; Aleksey Ermichkin; Dmitriy Bulkin	China (CHN); Yan Song; Liu Feng; Liu Huifen; Hu Xin	Portugal (POR); Pedro Emídio; João Oliveira; Sérgio Mateus; Vítor Silva
2005 Duisburg	Ukraine (UKR); Vladyslav Glushchenko; Oleksandr Bondarenko; Andriy Bondarenko; Andriy Perunov	Great Britain (GBR); Barrie Hindson; Scott Patterson; Stuart McKenzie; David Scott	Russia (RUS); Sergey Shetinin; Igor Zarudniy; Aleksandr Chemodanov; Artem Trifonov
2009 Kaohsiung	China (CHN); Sheng Fang; Youliang Han; Wangxin Xue; Yu Chao Zhao	Great Britain (GBR); Adam Buckingham; Adam McAssey; Jonathan Stranks; Alex Uttley	Ukraine (UKR); Andriy Bilozor; Denis Kriuchkov; Andrii Lytvak; Roman Urazbakiyev
2013 Cali	China (CHN); Zhou Yi; Tang Jian; Wu Yeqiuyin; Wang Lei	Russia (RUS); Maksim Chulkov; Valentin Chetverkin; Dmitry Bryzgalov; Aleksandr Kurasov	Ukraine (UKR); Oleksii Lesyk; Viktor Iaremchuk; Oleksandr Nelep; Andriy Kozynko
2017 Wroclaw	Great Britain (GBR); Lewis Watts; Adam Upcott; Charlie Tate; Conor Sawenko	China (CHN); Li Zheng; Rui Liuming; Zhang Teng; Zhou Jaihuai	Israel (ISR); Lidar Dana; Yannay Kalfa; Efi Efraim Sach; Daniel Uralevitch
2022 Birmingham	Great Britain (GBR); Bradley Gold; Archie Goonesekera; Finlay Gray; Andrew Morris-Hunt	Belgium (BEL); Jonas Raus; Viktor Vermeire; Wannes Vlaeminck; Simon de Wever	Ukraine (UKR); Stanislav Kukurudz; Yurii Push; Yuriy Savka; Taras Yarush

==== Groups, Balance Routine ====
Games	Gold	Silver	Bronze
1993 The Hague	Bulgaria (BUL); Stefan Nikolov; Theodor Georgiev; Pavlin Nikolov; Julian Vassilev	Germany (GER); Henry Krumb; Michael Bhettel; Manuel Messer; David Mullman	France (FRA); René Montaudoin; Thierry Maussier; Hugo Chal de Beauvais; Fabrice Berthet
1997 Lahti	Ukraine (UKR); Andrey Safonov; Yuriy Zaveryukha; Sergiy Pavlov; Dmitriy Bain	Russia (RUS); Denys Pirogov; Maksim Vlasov; Aleksandr Maikrov; Oleg Ivanov	China (CHN); Wu Weihuan; Huang Linseng; Chen Wuhua; Jiang Jianfen

==== Groups, Tempo Routine ====
Games	Gold	Silver	Bronze
1993 The Hague	Bulgaria (BUL); Stefan Nikolov; Theodor Georgiev; Pavlin Nikolov; Julian Vassilev	Germany (GER); Henry Krumb; Michael Bhettel; Manuel Messer; David Mullman	France (FRA); René Montaudoin; Thierry Maussier; Hugo Chal de Beauvais; Fabrice Berthet
1997 Lahti	China (CHN); Wu Weihuan; Huang Linseng; Chen Wuhua; Jiang Jianfen	Ukraine (UKR); Andrey Safonov; Yuriy Zaveryukha; Sergiy Pavlov; Dmitriy Bain	Russia (RUS); Denys Pirogov; Maksim Vlasov; Aleksandr Maikrov; Oleg Ivanov

=== Women ===
==== Pairs ====
Games	Gold	Silver	Bronze
1993 The Hague	Bulgaria (BUL); Gergana Deltcheva; Miroslava Ivanova	Ukraine (UKR); Marina Redkovolosova; Natalya Antipova	Portugal (POR); Paula Afonso; Rita Alexandre
1997 Lahti	Russia (RUS); Anna Mokhova; Yuliya Lopatkina	Belarus (BLR); Yekaterina Raktcheyeva; Oksana Feoktistova	Belgium (BEL); Kaat Croubels; Tine Dewaele
2001 Akita	Russia (RUS); Anna Mokhova; Yuliya Lopatkina	Belgium (BEL); Aline-Marie van den Weghe; Elke van Malgedem	Great Britain (GBR); Gemma Middleton; Amy Clarke
2005 Duisburg	Russia (RUS); Anna Melnikova; Yanna Cholayeva	Great Britain (GBR); Julie Cameron; Yvonne Welsh	Portugal (POR); Inês Valada; Cátia Messias
2009 Kaohsiung	Belgium (BEL); Tatiana de Vos; Florence Henrist	Azerbaijan (AZE); Ayla Ammadova; Dilara Sultanova	Great Britain (GBR); Mollie Grehan; Maiken Thorne
2013 Cali	Great Britain (GBR); Shanie Redd Thorne; Danielle Jones	Ukraine (UKR); Kateryna Sytnikova; Anastasiya Melnychenko	Belarus (BLR); Sviatlana Mikhnevich; Yana Yanusik
2017 Wroclaw	Russia (RUS); Daria Kalinina; Daria Guryeva	Belgium (BEL); Noemie Lammertyn; Lore Vanden Berghe	Ukraine (UKR); Veronika Habelok; Irina Nazimova
2022 Birmingham	Ukraine (UKR); Viktoriia Kozlovska; Taisiia Marchenko	Portugal (POR); Rita Teixeira; Rita Ferreira	United States (USA); Katie Borcherding; Cierra McKown

==== Pairs, Balance Routine ====
Games	Gold	Silver	Bronze
1993 The Hague	Bulgaria (BUL); Gergana Deltcheva; Miroslava Ivanova	Ukraine (UKR); Marina Redkovolosova; Natalya Antipova	Portugal (POR); Paula Afonso; Rita Alexandre
1997 Lahti	Russia (RUS); Anna Mokhova; Yuliya Lopatkina Belarus (BLR); Yekaterina Raktcheyeva; Oksana Feoktistova	None awarded	Belgium (BEL); Kaat Croubels; Tine Dewaele

==== Pairs, Tempo Routine ====
Games	Gold	Silver	Bronze
1993 The Hague	Bulgaria (BUL); Gergana Deltcheva; Miroslava Ivanova Ukraine (UKR); Marina Redkovolosova; Natalya Antipova	None awarded	Belarus (BLR); Matina Lobanova; Ina Drachuk
1997 Lahti	Russia (RUS); Anna Mokhova; Yuliya Lopatkina	China (CHN); Liao Xinxin; Lao Peiling	Belarus (BLR); Yekaterina Raktcheyeva; Oksana Feoktistova

==== Groups ====
Games	Gold	Silver	Bronze
1993 The Hague	Bulgaria (BUL); Marusia Ivanova; Miglena Pankova; Krasimira Petrova Poland (POL); Agnieszka Mrozowicz; Maezana Pawliszyn; Joanna Chmielewska	None awarded	China (CHN); Luo Tingtin; Sun Xiaohong; Zhao Li
1997 Lahti	Russia (RUS); Yelvira Zaliayeva; Svetlana Kushu; Yelena Avakeliyan	Ukraine (UKR); Yelena Moyseychea; Nadezhda Surina; Viktoriya Zherdeva	China (CHN); Xu Yingxia; Luo Xiajing; Wang Ting
2001 Akita	Russia (RUS); Svetlana Kushu; Yelena Avakeliyan; Yekaterina Lysenko	China (CHN); Huang Cuiling; Feng Jiepeng; Li Caidan	Belarus (BLR); Katsiaryna Katsuba; Zinaida Sazonova; Viktoriya Arabey
2005 Duisburg	Russia (RUS); Tatyana Alekseyeva; Yelena Moiseyeva; Yelena Kirilova	Belarus (BLR); Galina Starevich; Mariya Girut; Tatyana Motuz	Kazakhstan (KAZ); Gaukhar Ahmetova; Aleksandra Yenina; Aigul Dukenbayeva
2009 Kaohsiung	Russia (RUS); Ekaterina Loginova; Aygul Shaykhudinova; Ekaterina Stroynova	Great Britain (GBR); Rebecca Richardson; Candice Slater; Beth Young	Ukraine (UKR); Kateryna Kalíta; Yuliya Odintsova; Natalia Vinnik
2013 Cali	Russia (RUS); Ekaterina Stroynova; Aygul Shaykhudinova; Ekaterina Loginova	Great Britain (GBR); Georgia Lancaster; Millie Spalding; Elise Matthews	Belarus (BLR); Yuliya Khrypach; Hanna Kobyzeva; Julia Kovalenko
2017 Wroclaw	Russia (RUS); Daria Chebulanka; Polina Plastinina; Kseniia Zagoskina	Belarus (BLR); Julia Ivonchyk; Veronika Nabokina; Karina Sandovich	Great Britain (GBR); Emily Hancock; Isabel Haigh; Ilisha Boardman
2022 Birmingham	Belgium (BEL); Kim Bergmans; Lise de Meyst; Bo Hollebosch	Portugal (POR); Francisca Maia; Beatriz Carneiro; Barbara Sequeira	Ukraine (UKR); Daryna Pomianovska; Oleksandra Malchuk; Viktoriia Kunitska

==== Groups, Balance Routine ====
Games	Gold	Silver	Bronze
1993 The Hague	Bulgaria (BUL); Marusia Ivanova; Miglena Pankova; Krasimira Petrova Poland (POL); Agnieszka Mrozowicz; Maezana Pawliszyn; Joanna Chmielewska	None awarded	Belarus (BLR); Tatjana Butova; Svetlana Moshnina; Elena Kirpota
1997 Lahti	Russia (RUS); Yelvira Zaliayeva; Svetlana Kushu; Yelena Avakeliyan Ukraine (UKR); Yelena Moyseychea; Nadezhda Surina; Viktoriya Zherdeva	None awarded	China (CHN); Xu Yingxia; Luo Xiajing; Wang Ting

==== Groups, Tempo Routine ====
Games	Gold	Silver	Bronze
1993 The Hague	Bulgaria (BUL); Marusia Ivanova; Miglena Pankova; Krasimira Petrova Poland (POL); Agnieszka Mrozowicz; Maezana Pawliszyn; Joanna Chmielewska	None awarded	Belgium (BEL); Patricia Voet; Sofie de Mey; Sally van Renterghem
1997 Lahti	Russia (RUS); Yelvira Zaliayeva; Svetlana Kushu; Yelena Avakeliyan	Ukraine (UKR); Yelena Moyseychea; Nadezhda Surina; Viktoriya Zherdeva	China (CHN); Xu Yingxia; Luo Xiajing; Wang Ting

=== Mixed ===
==== Pairs ====
Games	Gold	Silver	Bronze
1993 The Hague	China (CHN); He Weiguan; Ting Yan	Ukraine (UKR); Olesya Oleynik; Stanislav Kosakovskiy	Bulgaria (BUL); Borislava Stankova; Ivailo Katzov
1997 Lahti	Russia (RUS); Sofiya Galiyulina; Dmitriy Kukva	China (CHN); Lu Xiaojun; Lu Yijie	Poland (POL); Ewelina Fijolek; Andrzej Sokołowski
2001 Akita	Russia (RUS); Polina Lymareva; Andrey Yakovlev	United States (USA); Shenea Lynne Booth; Carlos Amaro	Great Britain (GBR); Lisa Hobby; Patrick Bonner
2005 Duisburg	Russia (RUS); Anna Katchalova; Revaz Gurgenidze	Belgium (BEL); Tiffany Cuyt; Yves van der Donckt	Ukraine (UKR); Marina Chevchuk; Sergiy Pelepets
2009 Kaohsiung	United States (USA); Kristin Allen; Michael Rodrigues	Belgium (BEL); Julie van Gelder; Menno Vanderghote	Great Britain (GBR); Katie Axten; Nicholas Illingworth
2013 Cali	Great Britain (GBR); Dominic Smith; Alice Upcott	Portugal (POR); Gonçalo Pereira Rocha Roque; Leonor S. da Costa Bruges de Oliva	Belgium (BEL); Nicolas Vleeshouwers; Laure de Pryck
2017 Wroclaw	Russia (RUS); Marina Chernova; Georgy Pataraya	Belarus (BLR); Volha Melnik; Artur Beliakou	Great Britain (GBR); Katherine Williams; Lewis Walker
2022 Birmingham	Belgium (BEL); Bram Röttger; Helena Heijens	Germany (GER); Daniel Blintsov; Pia Schuetze	Israel (ISR); Meron Weissman; Adi Horwitz

==== Pairs, Balance Routine ====
Games	Gold	Silver	Bronze
1993 The Hague	China (CHN); He Weiguan; Ting Yan	Russia (RUS); Eduard Perelygin; Oksana Perelygina	Bulgaria (BUL); Borislava Stankova; Ivailo Katzov
1997 Lahti	Russia (RUS); Sofiya Galiyulina; Dmitriy Kukva	Poland (POL); Ewelina Fijolek; Andrzej Sokołowski	Great Britain (GBR); Louise Grimes; Glen Warton

==== Pairs, Tempo Routine ====
Games	Gold	Silver	Bronze
1993 The Hague	China (CHN); He Weiguan; Ting Yan	Lithuania (LTU); Jana Plotnikova; Sergei Eremkin	Ukraine (UKR); Olesya Oleynik; Stanislav Kosakovskiy
1997 Lahti	Russia (RUS); Sofiya Galiyulina; Dmitriy Kukva	Poland (POL); Ewelina Fijolek; Andrzej Sokołowski	Belgium (BEL); Eline Vancasteren; Hans Lismonde

== Aerobic gymnastics ==
=== Men ===
==== Individual ====
Games	Gold	Silver	Bronze
1997 Lahti	Kalojan Kalojanov (BUL)	Stanislav Marchenkov (RUS)	Patrick Nahafahik (NED)
2001 Akita	Jonatan Cañada (ESP)	Park Kwang-Soo (KOR)	Grégory Alcan (FRA)
2005 Duisburg	Vito Iaia (ITA)	Adrien Galo (FRA)	Sergey Konstantinov (RUS)
2009 Kaohsiung	Ivan Parejo (ESP)	Morgan Jacquemin (FRA)	Alexander Kondratichev (RUS)
2013 Cali	Benjamin Garavel (FRA)	Vicente Lli (ESP)	Ryu Ju-Sun (KOR)

=== Women ===
==== Individual ====
Games	Gold	Silver	Bronze
1997 Lahti	Juanita Little (AUS)	Olga Rumyantseva (RUS)	Barbara Vadovicová (SVK)
2001 Akita	Izabela Lăcătuş (ROU)	Ludmila Kovatscheva (BUL)	Giovanna Lecis (ITA)
2005 Duisburg	Elmira Dassaeva (ESP)	Giovanna Lecis (ITA)	Izabela Lăcătuş (ROU)
2009 Kaohsiung	Marcela Lopez (BRA)	Angella McMillan (NZL)	Huang Jinxuan (CHN)
2013 Cali	Oana Constantin (ROU)	Sara Moreno (ESP)	Lubov Gazov (AUT)

=== Mixed ===
==== Pairs ====
Games	Gold	Silver	Bronze
1997 Lahti	Russia (RUS); Tatyana Solovyova; Vladislav Oksner	Bulgaria (BUL); Konstantza Popova; Kalojan Kalojanov	Great Britain (GBR); Helen Carpenter-Waters; Alastair Rates
2001 Akita	Russia (RUS); Tatyana Solovyova; Vladislav Oksner	France (FRA); Rachel Muller; Stéphane Brecard	Bulgaria (BUL); Galina Lazarova; Marian Kolev
2005 Duisburg	Spain (ESP); Alba de las Heras; Jonatan Cañada	Romania (ROU); Izabela Lăcătuş; Remus Nicolai	Italy (ITA); Giovanna Lecis; Wilkie Satti
2009 Kaohsiung	France (FRA); Aurelie Joly; Julien Chaninet	Spain (ESP); Sara Moreno; Vicente Lli	China (CHN); Huang Jinxuan; He Shijian
2013 Cali	Romania (ROU); Bianca Becze; Marius Petruse France (FRA); Aurelie Joly; Benjamin Garavel Vietnam (VIE); Vu Ba Dong; Tran Thi Thu Ha Spain (ESP); Sara Moreno; Vicente Lli	None awarded	None awarded
2017 Wroclaw	Spain (ESP); Sara Moreno; Vicente LLi	Hungary (HUN); Dora Hegyi; Daniel Bali	Romania (ROU); Andreea Bogati; Dacian Barna
2022 Birmingham	Brazil (BRA); Lucas Barbosa; Tamirez Silva	Hungary (HUN); Dániel Bali; Fanni Mazács	Bulgaria (BUL); Antonio Papazov; Anna Maria Stoilova

==== Trio ====
Games	Gold	Silver	Bronze
1997 Lahti	Hungary (HUN); Attila Katus; Tamas Katus; Romeo Szentgyörgyi	Russia (RUS); Denys Belikov; Stanislav Marchenkov; Vadim Michaylov	France (FRA); Grégory Alcan; Xavier Julien; Olivier Salvan
2001 Akita	France (FRA); Grégory Alcan; Xavier Julien; Olivier Salvan	Romania (ROU); Remus Nicolai; Claudiu Varlam; Claudiu Moldovan	Bulgaria (BUL); Ludmila Kovatcheva; Galina Lazarova; Krassimira Dotzeva
2005 Duisburg	Romania (ROU); Raluca Babaligea; Madalina Cioveie; Cristina Nedelcu	France (FRA); Grégory Alcan; Christelle Alcan; Xavier Julien	Russia (RUS); Lyubov Bogdanova; Danila Shokhin; Pavel Grishin
2009 Kaohsiung	Romania (ROU); Mircea Brinzea; Valentin Mavrodineanu; Mircea Zamfir	China (CHN); Tao Le; Che Lei; Zhang Peng	France (FRA); Benjamin Garavel; Nicolas Garavel; Morgan Jacquemin
2013 Cali	China (CHN); Wang Zizhuo; Che Lei; Han Mingzhe	Romania (ROU); Anca Surdu; Oana Corina Constantin; Andrea Bogati	Russia (RUS); Alexander Kondratichev; Denis Soloviev; Dukhik Dzhanazyan
2017 Wroclaw	Japan (JPN); Kitazume Riri; Kanai Takumi; Saito Mizuki	China (CHN); Pan Lixi; Li Lingxiao; Ma Dong	France (FRA); Florian Bugalho; Maxime Decker; Tom Jourdan
2022 Birmingham	Hungary (HUN); Dániel Bali; Balázs Farkas; Fanni Mazács	Italy (ITA); Sara Cutini; Davide Nacci; Francesco Sebastio	Romania (ROU); Gabriel Bocșer; Miruna Iordache; Daniel Țavoc

==== Groups ====
Games	Gold	Silver	Bronze
2005 Duisburg	China (CHN); Ao Jinping; He Shijian; Qin Yong; Xiong Deliang; Yan Song; Yu Wei	Romania (ROU); Mihaela Pohoață; Cristina Marin; Raluca Băbăligea; Cristina Antonescu; Mădălina Cioveie; Cristina Nedelcu	France (FRA); Xavier Julien; Julien Chaninet; Adrien Galo; Harold Lorenzi; Gaylord Oubrier; Vivien Peralta
2009 Kaohsiung	China (CHN) Le TAO; Lei CHE; Peng ZHANG; Shijian HE; Wei YU; Zhen Hua NI	Romania (ROU) Anca Claudia SURDU; Cristina ANTONESCU; Cristina NEDELCU; Laura CRISTACHE; Nadina HOTCA; Oana Corina CONSTANTIN	Russia (RUS) Alexander KONDRATICHEV; Anton SHISHIGIN; Arseni TIKHOMIROV; Igor TRUSHKOV; Mikhail NAZARIEV; Ruslan FARAKSHATOV
2013 Cali	China (CHN) Bangda HU; Guang YANG; Lei CHE; Mingzhe HAN; Zizhuo WANG	Romania (ROU) Anca Claudia SURDU; Andreea BOGATI; Diana DEAC; Maria Bianca BECZE; Oana Corina CONSTANTIN	France (FRA) Benjamin GARAVEL; David ORTA; Jonathan GAJDANE; Mathieu DELIERS; Maxime DECKER-BREITEL
2017 Wroclaw	China (CHN); Li Lingxiao; Li Qi; Ma Dong; Pan Lixi; Wang Ke	Romania (ROU); Gabriel Bocser; Andreea Bogati; Lucian Săvulescu; Dacian Barna; Marian Brotei	Hungary (HUN); Dora Hegyi; Daniel Bali; Panna Szőllősi Balazs; Albert Farkas; Fanni Mazacs
2022 Birmingham	Italy (ITA); Sara Cutini; Matteo Falera; Davide Nacci; Marcello Patteri; Francesco Sebastio	Hungary (HUN); Balázs Farkas; Zoltán Lőcsei; Fanni Mazács; Panna Szőllősi; Dániel Bali	Romania (ROU); Gabriel Bocșer; Leonard Manta; Mihai Alin Popa; Antonio Surdu; Daniel Țavoc

==== Step ====
Games	Gold	Silver	Bronze
2013 Cali	China (CHN) Lu YIN; Minchao SHOU; Qin ZOU; Shilin DONG; Yangyang YU; Ye MA; Zhi LI; Zitong TU	Russia (RUS) Aleksei GERMANOV; Danil CHAYUN; Denis SHURUPOV; Evgeniia KUDYMOVA; Irina DOBRYAGINA; Oxana TRUKHACHEVA; Polina POLYANSKIKH; Veronika KORNEVA	France (FRA) Chrystel LEJEUNE; Clara BARAQUET; David ORTA; Gavin JOURDAN; Jonathan GAJDANE; Mathieu DELIERS; Maxime DECKER-BREITEL; Nicolas GARAVEL
2017 Wroclaw	Russia (RUS); Anastasia Degtiareva; Irina Dobriagina; Veronika Korneva; Ekaterina Pykhtova; Anastasia Ziubina; Danil Chaiun; Aleksei Germanov	China (CHN); Fu Yao; Huang Chengkai; Huang Zijing; Jiang Shuai; Liu Yiluan; Yang Qiaobo; Zhang Huiwen; Zhao Ming	Hungary (HUN); Erdősi Dániel; Kőrösi Kitti; Etényi Zsófia; Szabó Júlia; Szenes Boglárka; Szilvás Angéla; Táskai Anita; Varga Dorottya

==== Dance ====
Games	Gold	Silver	Bronze
2013 Cali	China (CHN) Chao MA; Guang YANG; Le TAO; Minchao SHOU; Qin ZOU; Yangyang YU; Zhi LI; Zitong TU	Romania (ROU) Anca Claudia SURDU; Andreea BOGATI; Cristian IORDAN; Dacian BARNA; Diana DEAC; Maria Bianca BECZE; Marius GAVRILOAIE; Marius PETRUSE Russia (RUS); Aleksei GERMANOV; Danil CHAYUN; Evgeniia KUDYMOVA; Igor TRUSHKOV; Irina DOBRYAGINA; Oxana TRUKHACHEVA; Polina POLYANSKIKH; Veronika KORNEVA	None
2017 Wroclaw	South Korea (KOR); Han Jae Hyun; Kim Hanjin; Kim Yu Hwan; Kwon Tae Yun; Lee Jon Gu; Park Hyunmin; Ryu Jusun; Song Sungkyu	Russia (RUS); Danil Chaiun; Garsevan Dzhanazian; Kirill Kulikov; Kirill Lobaznyuk; Roman Semenov; Anton Shishigin; Denis Shurupov; Aleksei Zhuravlev	Hungary (HUN); Dora Hegyi; Zoltan Lőcsei; Panna Szőllősi; Emese Timea Szaloki; Balazs Albert Farkas; Anna Deak; Fanni Mazacs; Klaudia Bokonyi
2022 Birmingham	Hungary (HUN); Balázs Farkas; Kata Hajdú; Zoltán Lőcsei; Anna Makranszki; Janka Ökrös; Vanessza Ruzicska; Zsófia Simon; Panna Szőllősi	Romania (ROU); Darius Branda; Sandra Dincă; Mirela Frîncu; Leonard Manta; Daria Mihaiu; Sarmiza Niculescu; Mihai Alin Popa; Antonio Surdu	Azerbaijan (AZE); Vladimir Dolmatov; Madina Mustafayeva; Khadija Guliyeva; Rauf Hajiyev; Sanan Mahmudlu; Nigar Mir Jalalli; Nazrin Mustafayeva; Aykhan Ahmadli

== Parkour ==
=== Men ===
==== Speedrun ====
Games	Gold	Silver	Bronze
2022 Birmingham	Ukraine; Bohdan Kolmakov	Italy; Andrea Consolini	United Kingdom; David Nelmes

==== Freestyle ====
Games	Gold	Silver	Bronze
2022 Birmingham	Greece; Ioakeim Theodoridis	Sweden; Elis Torhall	Belgium; Jérémy Lorsignol

=== Women ===
==== Speedrun ====
Games	Gold	Silver	Bronze
2022 Birmingham	Sweden; Miranda Tibbling	Netherlands; Noa Man	Japan; Hikari Izumi

==== Freestyle ====
Games	Gold	Silver	Bronze
2022 Birmingham	Netherlands; Noa Man	Sweden; Miranda Tibbling	Japan; Hikari Izumi

== Trampoline ==
=== Individual ===
This event was discontinued when trampolining was included in the program of the Olympic Games in 2000.

==== Men ====
Games	Gold	Silver	Bronze
1981 Santa Clara	Canada; Yves Milord	United States; Steve Elliott	United States; Rand Wilson
1985 London	France; Lionel Pioline	United Kingdom; Nigel Rendell	Spain; José Vives
1989 Karlsruhe	United Kingdom; Richard Cobbing	France; Fabrice Schwertz	West Germany; Amadeus Regenbrecht
1993 The Hague	France; Fabrice Schwertz	Ukraine; Sergey Buchovchev	Sweden; Martin von Stedingk
1997 Lahti	Belarus; Nikolay Kazak	France; Emmanuel Durand	Russia; Aleksandr Danilchenko

==== Women ====
Games	Gold	Silver	Bronze
1981 Santa Clara	United States; Bethany Fairchild	United States; Barbara Letho Canada; Christine Tough	None awarded
1985 London	United Kingdom; Andrea Holmes	United Kingdom; Susan Shotton	Australia; Elizabeth Jansen
1989 Karlsruhe	United Kingdom; Andrea Holmes	West Germany; Hiltrud Röwe	West Germany; Sandra Siwinna
1993 The Hague	United Kingdom; Susan Challis	United Kingdom; Andrea Holmes	France; Natalie Treil
1997 Lahti	Uzbekistan; Yelena Savaleva	Ukraine; Olena Movchan	Georgia; Anna Dogonadze

=== Mini Individual ===
==== Men ====
Games	Gold	Silver	Bronze
1981 Santa Clara	Canada; Brett Brown	United States; Carl Heger	Canada; Tim Cleave

==== Women ====
Games	Gold	Silver	Bronze
1981 Santa Clara	Canada; Christine Tough	United States; Bethany Fairchild	Canada; Norma Letho

=== Synchro ===
==== Men ====
Games	Gold	Silver	Bronze
1981 Santa Clara	United States; Carl Heger; Steve Elliott	United States; Paul Rugheimer; Carlos Villarreal	Canada; Brett Brown; Alan Gouthier
1985 London	West Germany; Amadeus Regenbrecht; Michael Kuhn	Spain; Cruz Blanco; José Vives	United Kingdom; Richard Cobbing; Tony Furlong
1989 Karlsruhe	West Germany; Michael Kuhn; Ralf Pelle	Denmark; Anders Christiansen; John Hansen	Australia; Michael Johnston; Adrian Wareham
1993 The Hague	Germany; Christian Kemmer; Martin Kubicka	Sweden; Martin von Stedingk; Lars von Stedingk	Denmark; Mads Ledstrup; Anders Christiansen
1997 Lahti	Belarus; Nikolay Kazak; Vladimir Kakorko	Germany; Michael Serth; Martin Kubicka	Australia; Adrian Wareham; Ji Wallace
2001 Akita	Russia; Aleksandr Moskalenko; German Khnychev	Belarus; Nikolay Kazak; Vladimir Kakorko	Japan; Takayuki Kawanishi; Daisuke Nakata
2005 Duisburg	Germany; Michael Serth; Henrik Stehlik	Russia; Aleksandr Rusakov; Aleksandr Leven	Belarus; Nikolay Kazak; Vladimir Kakorka
2009 Kaohsiung	Japan; Ito Masaki; Shunsuke Nagasaki	France; Sebastien Martiny; Gregoire Pennes	Germany; Martin Gromowski; Dennis Luxon-Pitkamin
2013 Cali	China; Dong Dong; Tu Xiao	Russia; Nikita Fedorenko; Dmitry Ushakov	Denmark; Peter Jensen; Christian Andersen
2017 Wroclaw	China; Dong Dong; Tu Xiao	Ukraine; Mykola Prostorov; Dmytro Byedyevkin	Japan; Takato Nakazono; Yamato Ishikawa

==== Women ====
Games	Gold	Silver	Bronze
1981 Santa Clara	Canada; Norma Letho; Barbara Letho	United States; Bethany Fairchild; Mary Borkowski	None awarded
1985 London	United Kingdom; Perry Thomas; Andrea Holmes	West Germany; Gabi Bahr; Beate Kruswicki	Netherlands; Jacqueline de Ruiter; Marjo van Diemen
1989 Karlsruhe	United Kingdom; Andrea Holmes; Sascha Halford	Australia; Lisa Newman-Morris; Elisabeth Jansen	West Germany; Hiltrud Röwe; Gabi Bahr
1993 The Hague	United Kingdom; Susan Challis; Andrea Holmes	Germany; Sandra Beck; Hiltrud Röwe	Australia; Sally Ann Proposch; Jacky Cully
1997 Lahti	Ukraine; Oxana Tsyhuleva; Olena Movchan	Uzbekistan; Yelena Savaleva; Yekaterina Khilko	Belarus; Galina Lebedeva; Natalya Karpenkova
2001 Akita	Ukraine; Oxana Tsyhuleva; Olena Movchan	United Kingdom; Kirstin Lawton; Claire Wright	Russia; Irina Karavayeva; Natalya Chernova
2005 Duisburg	Germany; Anna Dogonadze; Jessica Simon	Russia; Irina Karavayeva; Natalya Kolesnikova	Japan; Hiromi Hammoto; Yoko Seto
2009 Kaohsiung	China; Qingwen Gu; Yiqi Jiang Ukraine; Iuliia Domchevska; Olena Movchan	None awarded	Germany; Carina Baumgartner; Jessica Simon
2013 Cali	United Kingdom; Amanda Parker; Katherine Driscoll China; Zhong Xingping; Li Dan	None awarded	Ukraine; Maryna Kyiko; Nataliia Moskvina
2017 Wroclaw	Ukraine; Svitlana Malkova; Nataliia Moskvina	Azerbaijan; Sviatlana Makshtarova; Veronika Zemlianaia	Netherlands; Tara Fokke; Carljin Blekkink

=== Double-Mini Individual ===
==== Men ====
Games	Gold	Silver	Bronze
2001 Akita	Bulgaria; Radostin Rachev	Portugal; Diogo Manuel Faria	Germany; Uwe Marquardt
2005 Duisburg	Bulgaria; Radostin Rachev	Canada; Denis Vachon	Germany; Nico Gärtner
2009 Kaohsiung	Russia; Kiril Ivanov	Portugal; Nuno Lico	Germany; Nico Gärtner
2013 Cali	Brazil; Bruno Martini	Russia; Mikhail Zalomin	Portugal; Andre Lico
2017 Wroclaw	Russia; Mikhail Zalomin	United States; Alexander Renkert	Portugal; Diogo Carvalho
2022 Birmingham	Spain; David Franco	Germany; Daniel Schmidt	Japan; Ryohei Taniguchi

==== Women ====
Games	Gold	Silver	Bronze
2001 Akita	Bulgaria; Teodora Sinilkova	Australia; Jacinta Harford	Belgium; Lise Despriet
2005 Duisburg	Canada; Sarah Charles	Portugal; Nicole Pacheco	United States; Shelley Klochan
2009 Kaohsiung	Russia; Victoria Voronina	United States; Sarah Prosen	United States; Aubree Balkan
2013 Cali	Russia; Svetlana Balandina	Canada; Corissa Boychuk	Portugal; Silvia Saiote
2017 Wroclaw	United States; Paige Howard	Canada; Tamara O'Brien	Sweden; Lina Sjoeberg
2022 Birmingham	Spain; Melania Rodríguez	New Zealand; Bronwyn Dibb	Sweden; Lina Sjöberg

== Tumbling ==
=== Men ===
Games	Gold	Silver	Bronze
1981 Santa Clara	United States; Steve Elliott	United States; Randy Wickstrom	United States; Steve Cooper
1985 London	United States; Steve Elliott	United States; Chad Fox	France; Didier Sammola
1989 Karlsruhe	United States; Jon Beck	France; Pascal Eouzan	France; Christophe Lambert
1993 The Hague	United States; Jon Beck	United States; Rayshine Harris	Russia; Aleksey Kryzhanovskiy
1997 Lahti	Russia; Vladimir Ignatenkov	United States; Rayshine Harris	South Africa; Tseko Mogotsi
2001 Akita	Russia; Levon Petrosiyan	South Africa; Tseko Mogotsi	United Kingdom; Robert Small
2005 Duisburg	Poland; Jozef Wadecki	Belarus; Andrey Kabishev	Russia; Aleksandr Skorodumov
2009 Kaohsiung	Russia; Andrey Krylov	United Kingdom; Michael Barnes	Ukraine; Viktor Kyforenko
2013 Cali	China; Zhang Luo Ukraine; Viktor Kyforenko	None awarded	United Kingdom; Kristof Willerton
2017 Wroclaw	China; Zhang Luo	United States; Austin Nacey	Russia; Maxim Shlyakin
2022 Birmingham	United States; Kaden Brown	France; Axel Duriez	Denmark; Rasmus Steffensen

=== Women ===
Games	Gold	Silver	Bronze
1981 Santa Clara	United States; Angie Whiting	United States; Kristi Laman	United States; Stacey Hansen
1985 London	France; Isabelle Jagueux	United States; Megan Cunningham	Canada; Maria Constantinitis
1989 Karlsruhe	France; Chrystel Robert	United States; Michelle Mara	United States; Melanie Bugg
1993 The Hague	France; Chrystel Robert	Belarus; Tatyana Morosova	United States; Michelle Mara
1997 Lahti	Ukraine; Olena Chabanenko	France; Chrystel Robert	Russia; Natalya Borisenko
2001 Akita	Russia; Yelena Bluyina	United Kingdom; Kathryn Peberdy	Belarus; Anna Terenya
2005 Duisburg	Ukraine; Olena Chabanenko	Russia; Anna Korobeynikova	United States; Yuliya Hall
2009 Kaohsiung	Russia; Anna Korobeynikova	Russia; Anzhelika Soldatkina	Canada; Emily Smith
2013 Cali	China; Jia Fangfang	United Kingdom; Rachael Letsche	Canada; Emily Smith
2017 Wroclaw	China; Jia Fangfang	Russia; Anna Korobeynikova	United Kingdom; Lucie Colebeck
2022 Birmingham	France; Candy Brière-Vetillard	United States; Miah Bruns	Australia; Breanah Cauchi
