= Jana Plotnikova =

Lithuanian acrobatic gymnast

Medal record

Acrobatics

Representing Lithuania

World Games
Silver medal – second place	1993 The Hague	Mixed pairs - tempo

World Championships
Bronze medal – third place	1992 Rennes	Mixed pairs

European Championships
Silver medal – second place	1992 Rennes	Mixed pairs

Jana Plotnikova is Lithuanian female acrobatics gymnast. She competed in pair with Sergejus Jeriomkinas.

Plotnikova started acrobatics at the Visaginas Acrobatics Sports School.

In 1992 pair won silver in European championships, bronze in world championships and qualified for the World Games. In 1993 World Games Plotnikova/Jeriomkinas won silver in mixed pairs tempo event.
