= Sergejus Jeriomkinas =

Lithuanian acrobatic gymnast

Medal record

Acrobatic gymnastics

Representing Lithuania

World Games
Silver medal – second place	1993 The Hague	Mixed pairs - tempo

World Championships
Bronze medal – third place	1992 Rennes	Mixed pairs

European Championships
Silver medal – second place	1992 Rennes	Mixed pairs

Sergejus Jeriomkinas is a Lithuanian male acrobatics gymnast. He competed in pairs with Jana Plotnikova.

Jeriomkinas started acrobatics at the Visaginas Acrobatics Sports School.

In 1992, the pair won silver in the European championships, bronze in the world championships and qualified for the World Games. In the 1993 World Games, the Plotnikova/Jeriomkinas pair won silver in the mixed pairs tempo event.
