= Acrobatic gymnastics at the 2001 World Games – Mixed pair =

Mixed pair at the World Games
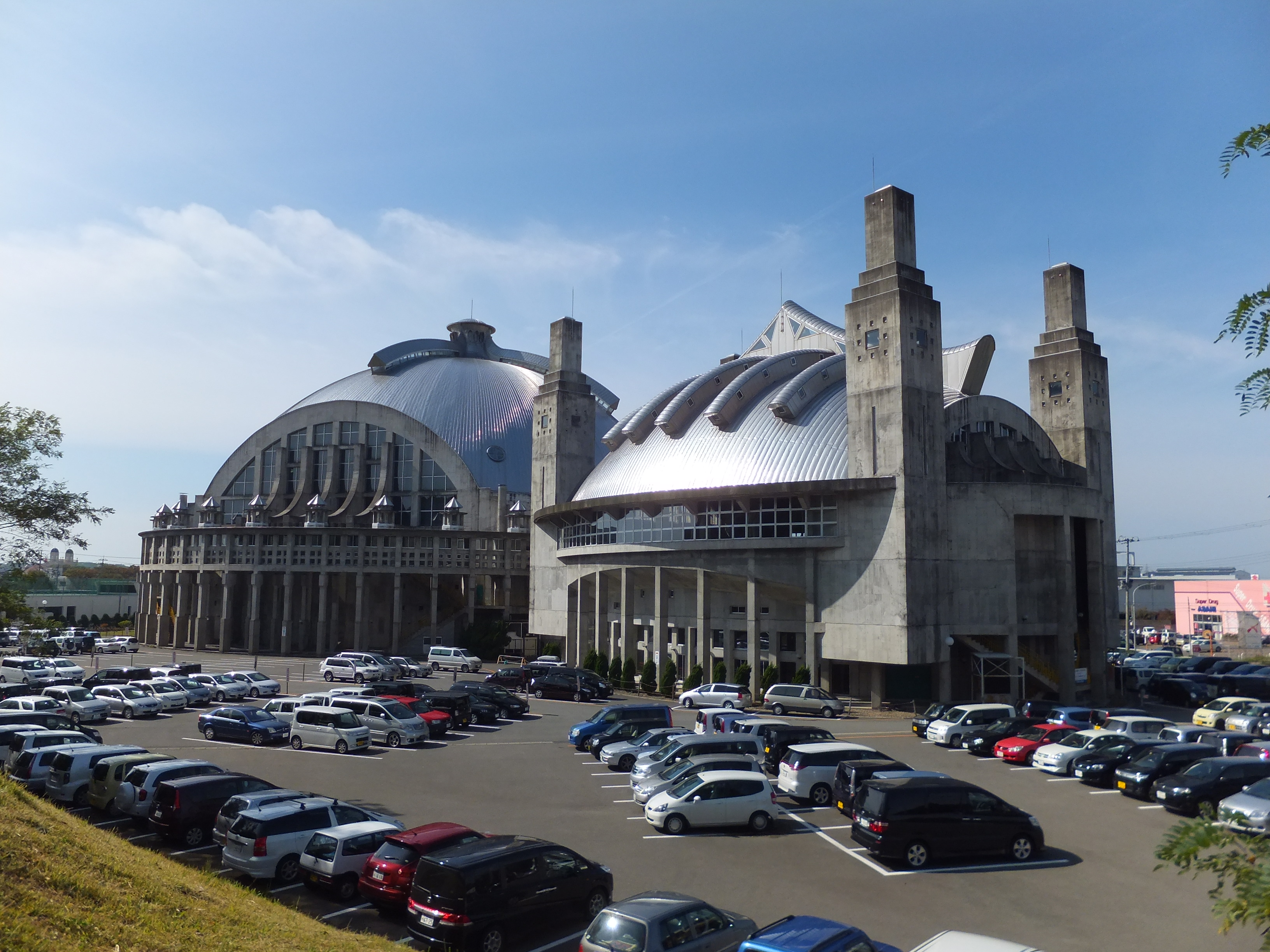
- Akita City Gymnasium
- Venue: Akita City Gymnasium, Akita, Japan
- Date: 19–21 August 2001
- Competitors: 12 from 6 nations
- Winning total: 20.393 points

Medalists
1st place, gold medalist(s)		Andrey Yakovlev; Polina Lymareva	Russia
2nd place, silver medalist(s)		Julian Amaro; Shenea Booth	United States
3rd place, bronze medalist(s)		Patrick Bonner; Lisa Hobby	Great Britain

The mixed pair competition at the 2001 World Games in Akita was played from 19 to 21 August. 12 acrobatic gymnastics competitors, from 6 nations, participated in the tournament. The acrobatic gymnastics competition took place at Akita City Gymnasium in Akita, Japan.

== Competition format ==
The top 4 teams in qualifications, based on combined scores of each round, advanced to the final. The scores in qualification do not count in the final.

== Results ==
=== Qualification ===
Rank	Country	Team	Balance	Tempo	Total	Note
1	Russia	Andrey Yakovlev; Polina Lymareva	19.809	18.766	38.575	Q
2	China	Hu Enning; Cai Chenchen	19.239	18.473	37.712	Q
3	United States	Julian Amaro; Shenea Booth	18.756	18.360	37.116	Q
4	Great Britain	Patrick Bonner; Lisa Hobby	18.500	17.650	36.150	Q
5	Belgium	Yves Van der Donckt; Geraldine Van den Weghe	17.040	17.586	34.626	
6	Portugal	Antonio Silva; Raquel Leitao	16.619	16.859	33.478	

=== Final ===
Rank	Country	Team	Points	Add	Total
1st place, gold medalist(s)	Russia	Andrey Yakovlev; Polina Lymareva	14.533	5.86	20.393
2nd place, silver medalist(s)	United States	Julian Amaro; Shenea Booth	14.466	5.16	19.626
3rd place, bronze medalist(s)	Great Britain	Patrick Bonner; Lisa Hobby	14.166	5.20	19.366
4	China	Hu Enning; Cai Chenchen	14.166	4.96	19.126
