= 1992 World Sports Acrobatics Championships =

10th World Sports Acrobatics Championships
- Location: Rennes, France
- Start date: 25 November 1992
- End date: 28 November 1992
- Competitors: 71 from 9 nations

The 1992 World Sports Acrobatics Championships were held in Rennes, France, from 25 to 28 November 1992.

== Medal table ==
Rank	Nation	Gold	Silver	Bronze	Total
1	Russia	10	10	1	21
2	China	9	2	4	15
3	France	3	0	0	3
4	Bulgaria	2	3	5	10
5	Poland	0	2	3	5
6	Ukraine	0	1	5	6
7	Lithuania	0	0	3	3
8	Belarus	0	0	1	1
8	Germany	0	0	1	1
Totals (9 entries)		24	18	23	65

== Men's Tumbling ==
=== Overall ===
Rank	Team	Country	Point
Gold medal	A. Khryzhanovsky	Russia	
Silver medal	V. Ignatenkov	Russia	
Bronze medal	K. Wilusz	Poland	

=== Somersault ===
Rank	Team	Country	Point
Gold medal	M. Wu	China	
Silver medal	R. Walczak	Poland	
Bronze medal	G. Duchenko	Ukraine	

=== Twisting ===
Rank	Team	Country	Point
Gold medal	V. Ignatenkov	Russia	
Silver medal	K. Wilusz	Poland	
Bronze medal	M. Wu	China	

=== Men's Group ===
==== Overall ====
Rank	Team	Country	Point
Gold medal	Kirpitchev, Volodin, Novichikhin, Menzhega	Russia	
Silver medal	Ji, Wu, Tao, Meng	China	
Bronze medal	Krumb, Schmidt, Messer, Mullmann	Germany	

==== Balance ====
Rank	Team	Country	Point
Gold medal	Kirpitchev, Volodin, Novichikhin, Menzhega	Russia	
Silver medal	Vintilov, Tischenko, Kharun, Bobrovnik	Ukraine	
Bronze medal	Nikolov, Gueorguiev, Nikolov, Vassilev	Bulgaria	
Bronze medal	Ji, Wu, Tao, Meng	China	

==== Tempo ====
Rank	Team	Country	Point
Gold medal	Kirpitchev, Volodin, Novichikhin, Menzhega	Russia	
Silver medal	Ji, Wu, Tao, Meng	China	
Bronze medal	Vintilov, Tischenko, Kharun, Bobrovnik	Ukraine	

=== Men's Pair ===
==== Overall ====
Rank	Team	Country	Point
Gold medal	Chao Fensu, Huang Hai	China	
Silver medal	Korovin, Pozdnyakov	Russia	
Bronze medal	Latchkov, Vladev	Bulgaria	

==== Balance ====
Rank	Team	Country	Point
Gold medal	Chao Fensu, Huang Hai	China	
Silver medal	Korovin, Pozdnyakov	Russia	
Bronze medal	Latchkov, Vladev	Bulgaria	

==== Tempo ====
Rank	Team	Country	Point
Gold medal	Chao Fensu, Huang Hai	China	
Silver medal	Korovin, Pozdnyakov	Russia	
Bronze medal	Wlezien, Piechota	Poland	
Bronze medal	Kniazev, Perechrest	Lithuania	

=== Mixed Pair ===
==== Overall ====
Rank	Team	Country	Point
Gold medal	Zhu, Li	China	
Silver medal	Perelygin, Perelygina	Russia	
Bronze medal	Jeriomkin, Plotnikova	Lithuania	

==== Balance ====
Rank	Team	Country	Point
Gold medal	Zhu, Li	China	
Silver medal	Perelygin, Perelygina	Russia	
Bronze medal	Jeriomkin, Plotnikova	Lithuania	

==== Tempo ====
Rank	Team	Country	Point
Gold medal	Zhu, Li	China	
Silver medal	Katzov, Stankova	Bulgaria	
Bronze medal	Kosakovskiy, Oliynik	Ukraine	

=== Women's Group ===
==== Overall ====
Rank	Team	Country	Point
Gold medal	Tcholakova, Angelova, Entcheva	Bulgaria	
Gold medal	Koltsova, Povetkina, Panfilova	Russia	
Bronze medal	Liu, Chai, Xu	China	

==== Balance ====
Rank	Team	Country	Point
Gold medal	Tcholakova, Angelova, Entcheva	Bulgaria	
Gold medal	Koltsova, Povetkina, Panfilova	Russia	
Bronze medal	Kakhovkaia, Domashenko, Grishcenko	Ukraine	

==== Tempo ====
Rank	Team	Country	Point
Gold medal	Liu, Chai, Xu	China	
Silver medal	Koltsova, Povetkina, Panfilova	Russia	
Bronze medal	Tcholakova, Angelova, Entcheva	Bulgaria	

=== Women's Pair ===
==== Overall ====
Rank	Team	Country	Point
Gold medal	Vinnikova, Pautova	Russia	
Silver medal	Datcheva, Stoykova	Bulgaria	
Bronze medal	Sakowska, Bondarczuk	Poland	

==== Balance ====
Rank	Team	Country	Point
Gold medal	Vinnikova, Pautova	Russia	
Silver medal	Datcheva, Stoykova	Bulgaria	
Bronze medal	Sovik, Nosenko	Ukraine	

==== Tempo ====
Rank	Team	Country	Point
Gold medal	M. Lu, Q. Fan	China	
Gold medal	Vinnikova, Pautova	Russia	
Bronze medal	Datcheva, Stoykova	Bulgaria	

=== Women's Tumbling ===
==== Overall ====
Rank	Team	Country	Point
Gold medal	C. Robert	France	
Silver medal	N. Kadatova	Russia	
Bronze medal	T. Paniivan	Russia	

==== Somersault ====
Rank	Team	Country	Point
Gold medal	C. Robert	France	
Silver medal	N. Kadatova	Russia	
Bronze medal	T. Morozova	Belarus	

==== Twisting ====
Rank	Team	Country	Point
Gold medal	C. Robert	France	
Silver medal	N. Kadatova	Russia	
Bronze medal	H. Zhu	China	
