= Aerobic gymnastics at the 2017 World Games – Open event step =

Open event step aerobic gymnastics at the World Games
- Venue: Centennial Hall, Wrocław, Poland
- Date: 22 July 2017
- Competitors: 48 from 6 nations
- Winning total: 18.600 points

Medalists
1st place, gold medalist(s)		Anastasia Degtiareva; Irina Dobriagina; Veronika Korneva; Ekaterina Pykhtova; Anastasia Ziubina; Danil Chaiun; Aleksei Germanov	Russia
2nd place, silver medalist(s)		Fu Yao; Huang Chengkai; Huang Zijing; Jiang Shuai; Liu Yiluan; Yang Qiaobo; Zhang Huiwen; Zhao Ming	China
3rd place, bronze medalist(s)		Erdősi Dániel; Kőrösi Kitti; Etényi Zsófia; Szabó Júlia; Szenes Boglárka; Szilvás Angéla; Táskai Anita; Varga Dorottya	Hungary

The open event step competition at the 2017 World Games in Wrocław was played on 22 July. 48 Aerobic gymnastics competitors, from 6 nations, participated in the tournament. The Aerobic gymnastics competition took place at Centennial Hall in Lower Silesian Voivodeship.

== Competition format ==
The top 4 teams in qualifications, advanced to the final. The scores in qualification do not count in the final.

== Qualification ==
Team	Artistic	Execution	Total	
Team	Score	Score	Score	Rank
China	9.225	9.275	18.500	1
Russia	9.350	9.100	18.450	2
Hungary	9.150	8.950	18.100	3
Ukraine	8.850	8.850	17.700	4
South Korea	8.900	8.800	17.700	5
Mongolia	8.750	8.700	17.450	6

== Final ==
Rank	Team	Artistic	Execution	Total
Rank	Team	Score	Score	Score
1st place, gold medalist(s)	Russia	9.400	9.200	18.600
2nd place, silver medalist(s)	China	9.300	9.250	18.550
3rd place, bronze medalist(s)	Hungary	9.200	9.050	18.250
4	Ukraine	8.900	8.900	17.800

== Final standing ==
Rank	Team
1st place, gold medalist(s)	Russia
2nd place, silver medalist(s)	China
3rd place, bronze medalist(s)	Hungary
4	Ukraine
5	South Korea
6	Mongolia

== Medalists ==
Event	Gold	Silver	Bronze
Open event step	Russia; Anastasia Degtiareva; Irina Dobriagina; Veronika Korneva; Ekaterina Pykhtova; Anastasia Ziubina; Danil Chaiun; Aleksei Germanov	China; Fu Yao; Huang Chengkai; Huang Zijing; Jiang Shuai; Liu Yiluan; Yang Qiaobo; Zhang Huiwen; Zhao Ming	Hungary; Erdősi Dániel; Kőrösi Kitti; Etényi Zsófia; Szabó Júlia; Szenes Boglárka; Szilvás Angéla; Táskai Anita; Varga Dorottya
