= Aerobic gymnastics at the 2001 World Games – Mixed pair =

Mixed pair at the World Games
- Venue: Akita City Gymnasium, Akita, Japan
- Date: 17–18 August 2001
- Competitors: 16 from 8 nations
- Winning total: 17.380 points

Medalists
1st place, gold medalist(s)		Vladislav Oksner; Tatiana Soloviova	Russia
2nd place, silver medalist(s)		Stéphane Brecard; Rachel Muller	France
3rd place, bronze medalist(s)		Marian Kolev; Galina Lazarova	Bulgaria

The mixed pair competition in aerobic gymnastics at the 2001 World Games in Akita was played from 17 to 18 August. The aerobic gymnastics competition took place at Akita City Gymnasium.

== Competition format ==
A total of 8 teams entered the competition. Only final was held.

== Results ==
Rank	Country	Team	Score
1st place, gold medalist(s)	Russia	Vladislav Oksner; Tatiana Soloviova	17.380
2nd place, silver medalist(s)	France	Stéphane Brecard; Rachel Muller	17.380
3rd place, bronze medalist(s)	Bulgaria	Marian Kolev; Galina Lazarova	16.900
4	Romania	Izabela Lăcătuș; Remus Nicolai	16.830
5	Chile	Sandra Arriagada; Jaime Salgado	16.650
6	Spain	Maria Gonzalez; Octavio Garcia	16.450
7	South Korea	Choi Young-han; Choi In-young	16.150
8	Japan	Rumi Sato; Hisaki Sato	13.700
