= 1992 European Acrobatics Championships =

The 13th European Acrobatics Championships was held in Rennes, France 25–28 November 1992.

== Results ==
Event	Gold	Silver	Bronze
Men's Tumbling - Overall	A. Kryzhanovski (RUS)	V. Ignatenkov (RUS)	Krysztof Wilusz (POL)
Men's Tumbling - Somersau	R. Wolczak (POL)	G. Duchenko (UKR)	Stanimir Ivanov (BUL)
Men's Tumbling - Twisting	V. Ignatenkov (RUS)	Krysztof Wilusz (POL)	P. Pavlov (BUL)
Men's Pairs - Overall	Russia	Bulgaria	Poland
Men's Pairs - Balance	Russia	Bulgaria	Poland
Men's Pairs - Tempo	Russia	Lithuania; Igoris Perechrestas; Sergejus Kniazevas; Poland; T. Wlezien; A. Piechota	
Men's Fours - Overall	Russia	Germany	Bulgaria
Men's Fours - Balance	Russia	Ukraine	Bulgaria
Men's Fours - Tempo	Russia	Ukraine	Poland
Women's Tumbling - Overall	Chrystel Robert (FRA)	N. Kadatova (RUS)	T. Paniivan (RUS)
Women's Tumbling - Somersau	Chrystel Robert (FRA)	N. Kadatova (RUS)	T. Morozova (BLR)
Women's Tumbling - Twisting	Chrystel Robert (FRA)	T. Paniivan (RUS)	T. Morozova (BLR)
Women's Pairs - Overall	Russia	Bulgaria	Poland
Women's Pairs - Balance	Russia	Bulgaria	Ukraine
Women's Pairs - Tempo	Russia	Bulgaria	Poland
Women's Trio - Overall	Russia; Bulgaria		Belarus; Poland
Women's Trio - Balance	Russia; Bulgaria		Ukraine
Women's Trio - Tempo	Russia	Bulgaria	Poland
Mixed Pairs - Overall	Russia	Lithuania; Jana Plotnikova; Sergejus Jeriomkinas	Ukraine
Mixed Pairs - Balance	Russia	Lithuania; Jana Plotnikova; Sergejus Jeriomkinas	Ukraine
Mixed Pairs - Tempo	Bulgaria	Ukraine	Russia

=== Medal table ===
Rank	Nation	Gold	Silver	Bronze	Total
1	Russia (RUS)	16	4	2	22
2	Bulgaria (BUL)	3	6	4	13
3	France (FRA)	3	0	0	3
4	Poland (POL)	1	2	8	11
5	Ukraine (UKR)	0	4	4	8
6	Lithuania (LTU)	0	3	0	3
7	Germany (GER)	0	1	0	1
8	Belarus (BLR)	0	0	3	3
Totals (8 entries)		23	20	21	64

== Participating nations ==
- Belarus
- Belgium
- Bulgaria
- France
- Great Britain
- Germany
- Greece
- Hungary
- Ireland
- Latvia
- Lithuania
- Poland
- Portugal
- Russia
- Ukraine
