= Acrobatic gymnastics at the 2001 World Games – Men's group =

Men's group at the 2001 World Games
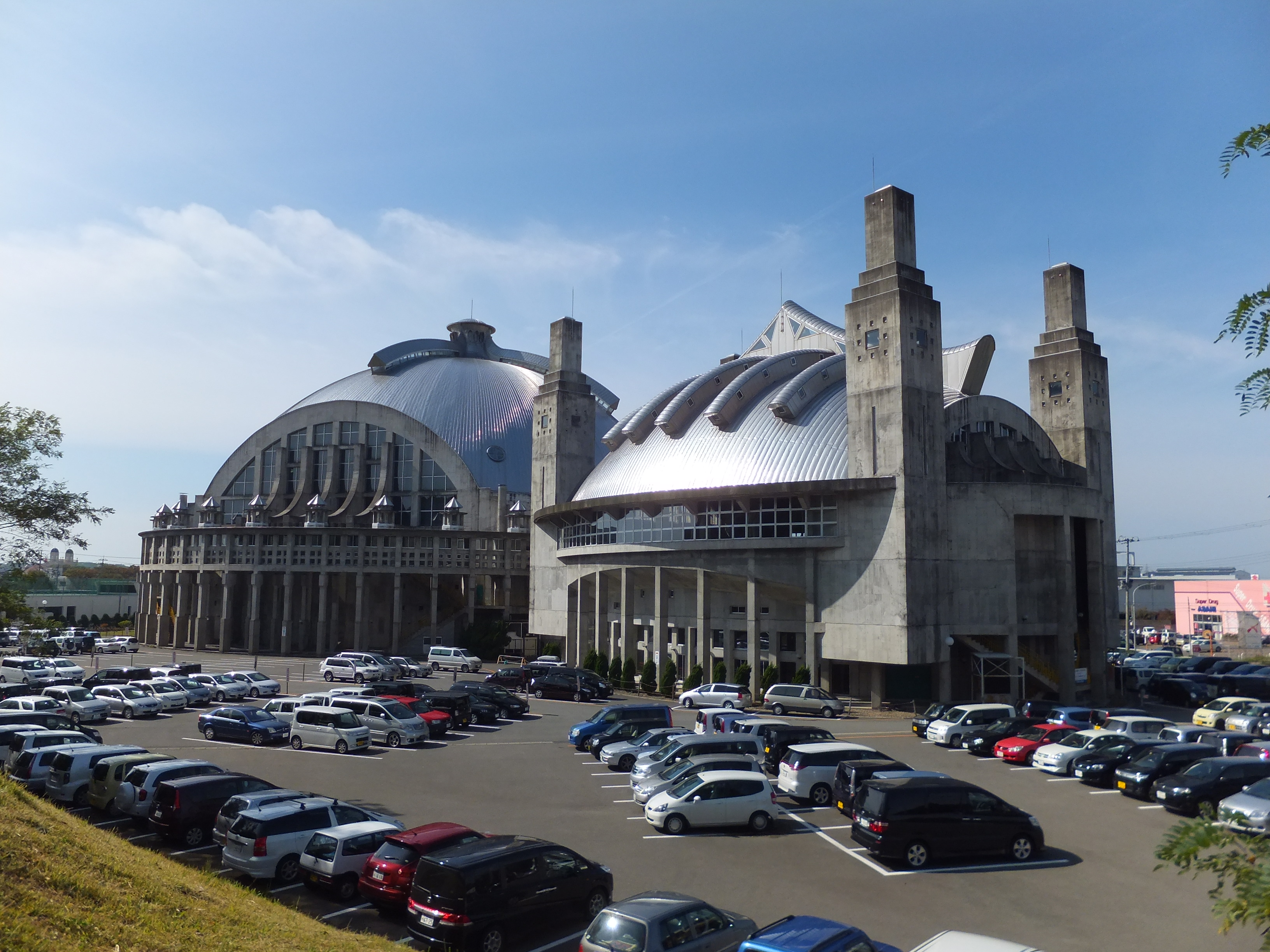
- Akita City Gymnasium
- Venue: Akita City Gymnasium, Akita, Japan
- Date: 19–21 August 2001
- Competitors: 24 from 6 nations
- Winning total: 20.500 points

Medalists
1st place, gold medalist(s)		Aleksey Shcherbakov; Vadim Galkin; Aleksey Ermichkin; Dmitry Bulkin	Russia
2nd place, silver medalist(s)		Yan Song; Liu Feng; Liu Huifeng; Hu Xin	China
3rd place, bronze medalist(s)		Pedro Emídio; João Oliveira; Sérgio Mateus; Vítor Silva	Portugal

The men's competition at the 2001 World Games in Akita was played from 19 to 21 August. 24 acrobatic gymnastics competitors, from 6 nations, participated in the tournament. The acrobatic gymnastics competition took place at Akita City Gymnasium in Akita, Japan.

== Competition format ==
The top 4 teams in qualifications, based on combined scores of each round, advanced to the final. The scores in qualification do not count in the final.

== Results ==
=== Qualification ===
Rank	Country	Team	Balance	Tempo	Total	Note
1	Russia	Aleksey Shcherbakov; Vadim Galkin; Aleksey Ermichkin; Dmitry Bulkin	19.533	18.133	37.666	Q
2	China	Yan Song; Liu Feng; Liu Huifeng; Hu Xin	19.790	17.803	37.593	Q
3	Great Britain	Stuart McKenzie; David Scott; Barry Hindson; Scott Patterson	18.303	17.512	35.815	Q
4	Portugal	Pedro Emídio; João Oliveira; Sérgio Mateus; Vítor Silva	18.479	16.526	35.005	Q
5	United States	Joshua Coblenz; Michael Nasikan; Kevin Grear; Yuri Kostovetskiy	18.280	16.633	34.913	
6	Japan	Motoki Ogawara; Takeshi Ogawa; Nobuo Sowa; Masaaki Isomae	11.299	11.866	23.165	

=== Final ===
Rank	Country	Team	Points	Add	Total
1st place, gold medalist(s)	Russia	Aleksey Shcherbakov; Vadim Galkin; Aleksey Ermichkin; Dmitry Bulkin	13.800	6.70	20.500
2nd place, silver medalist(s)	China	Yan Song; Liu Feng; Liu Huifeng; Hu Xin	13.733	6.02	19.753
3rd place, bronze medalist(s)	Portugal	Pedro Emídio; João Oliveira; Sérgio Mateus; Vítor Silva	12.999	4.60	17.599
4	Great Britain	Stuart McKenzie; David Scott; Barry Hindson; Scott Patterson	12.433	3.58	16.013
