= Acrobatic gymnastics at the 2001 World Games – Women's group =

2001 Akira world games sporting event

Women's group at the World Games
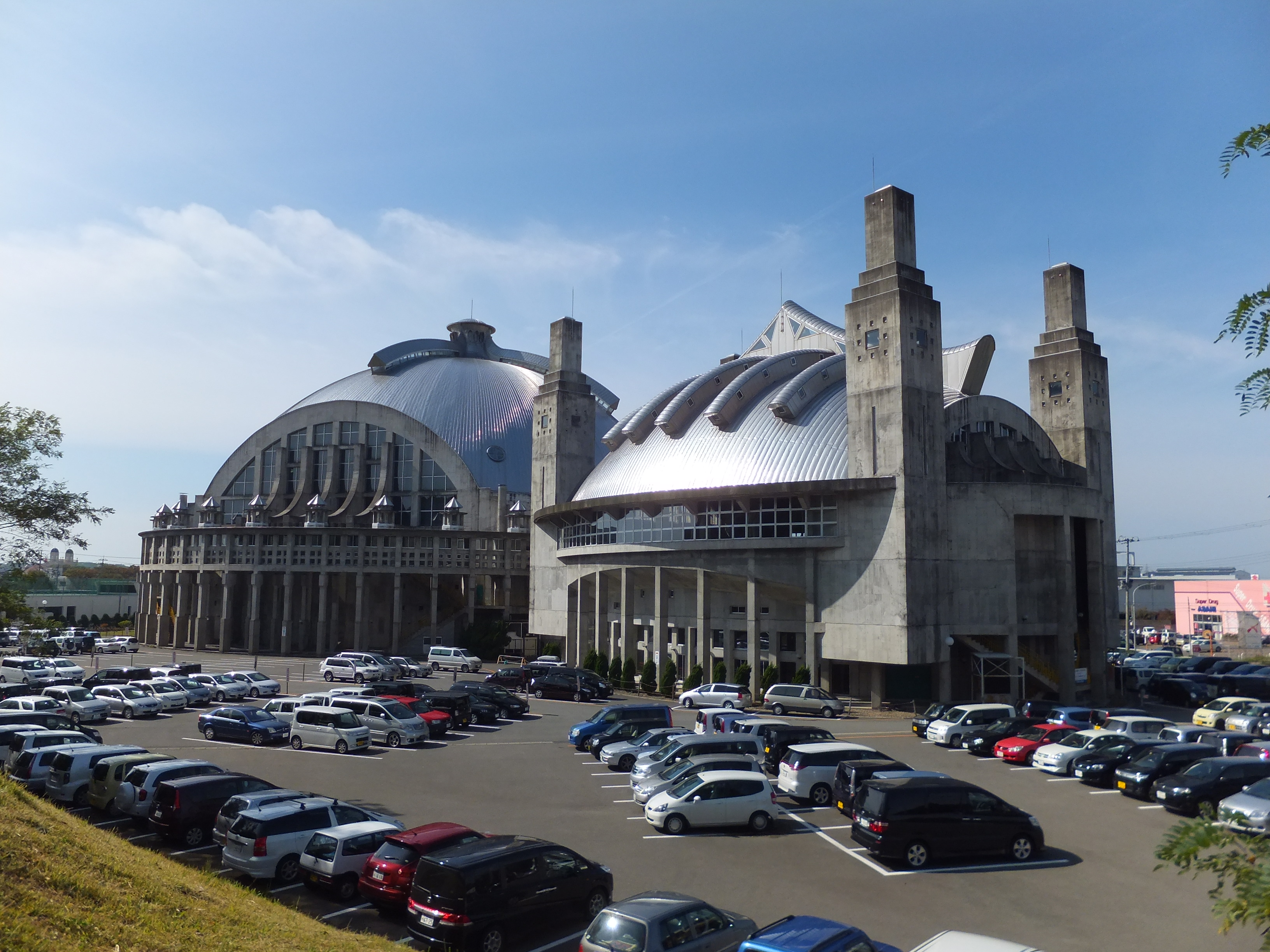
- Akita City Gymnasium
- Venue: Akita City Gymnasium, Akita, Japan
- Date: 19-21 August 2001
- Competitors: 15 from 5 nations
- Winning total: 21.059 points

Medalists
1st place, gold medalist(s)		Svetlana Kushu; Elena Arakelian; Ekaterina Lysenko	Russia
2nd place, silver medalist(s)		Huang Cuiling; Feng Jiepeng; Li Caidan	China
3rd place, bronze medalist(s)		Katsiaryna Katsuba; Zinaida Sazonava; Viktoryia Arabei	Belarus

The women's competition at the 2001 World Games in Akita was played from 19 to 21 August. 15 acrobatic gymnastics competitors, from 5 nations, participated in the tournament. The acrobatic gymnastics competition took place at Akita City Gymnasium in Akita, Japan.

== Competition format ==
The top 4 teams in qualifications, based on combined scores of each round, advanced to the final. The scores in qualification do not count in the final.

== Results ==
=== Qualification ===
Rank	Country	Team	Balance	Tempo	Total	Note
1	Russia	Svetlana Kushu; Elena Arakelian; Ekaterina Lysenko	19.489	20.253	39.742	Q
2	China	Huang Cuiling; Feng Jiepeng; Li Caidan	19.082	18.720	37.802	Q
3	Belarus	Katsiaryna Katsuba; Zinaida Sazonava; Viktoryia Arabei	19.053	18.542	37.595	Q
4	Great Britain	Emily Crocker; Emily Collins; Toni Cox	18.346	18.206	36.552	Q
5	Kazakhstan	Aigul Doukenbayeva; Saltanat Alekeyeva; Yelena Yatsenko	17.433	15.519	32.952	

=== Final ===
Rank	Country	Team	Points	Add	Total
1st place, gold medalist(s)	Russia	Svetlana Kushu; Elena Arakelian; Ekaterina Lysenko	14.599	6.46	21.059
2nd place, silver medalist(s)	China	Huang Cuiling; Feng Jiepeng; Li Caidan	14.166	5.68	19.846
3rd place, bronze medalist(s)	Belarus	Katsiaryna Katsuba; Zinaida Sazonava; Viktoryia Arabei	13.733	5.84	19.573
4	Great Britain	Emily Crocker; Emily Collins; Toni Cox	14.133	3.48	17.613
