= Acrobatic gymnastics at the 2001 World Games – Women's pair =

Women's pair at the World Games
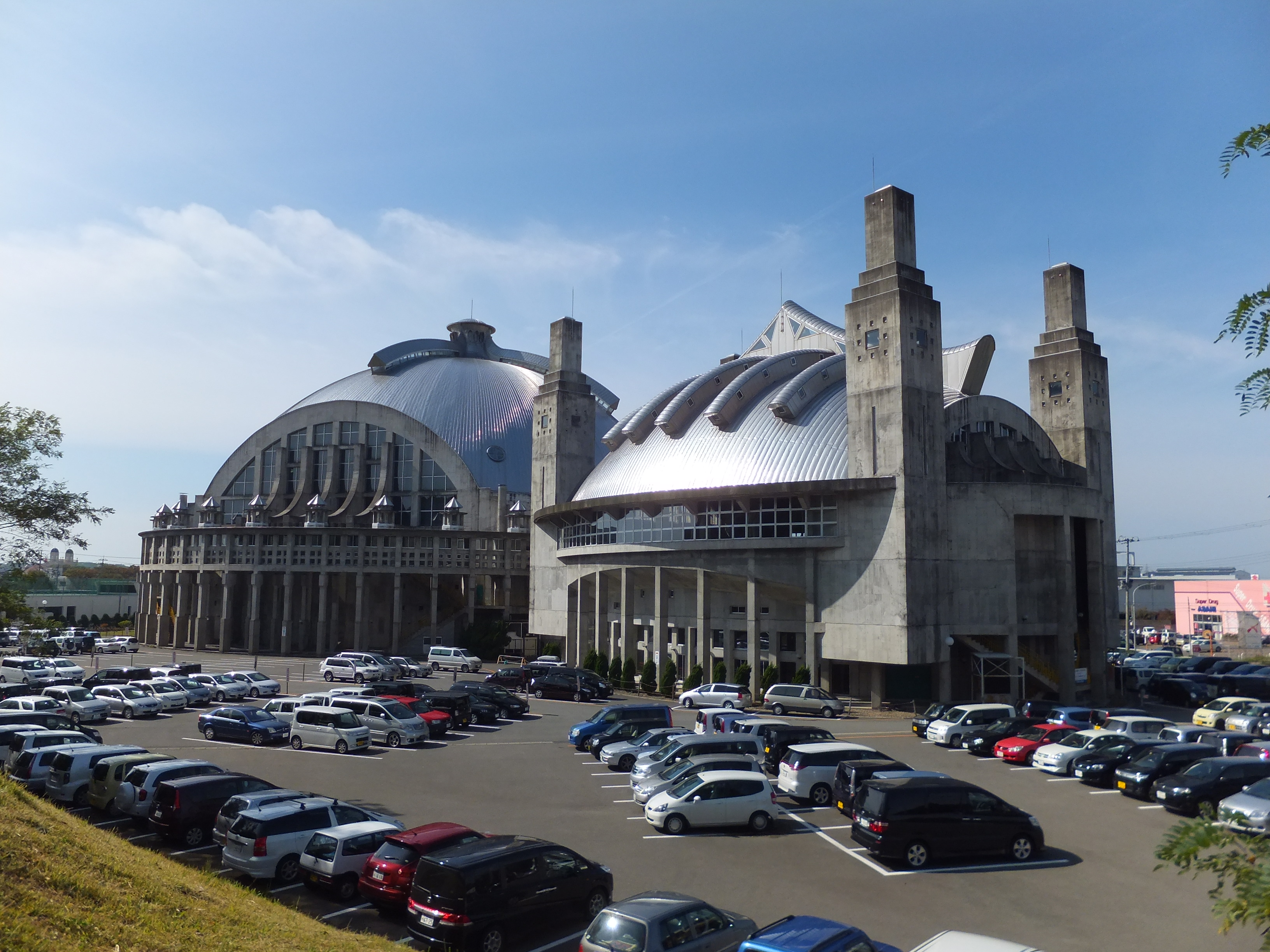
- Akita City Gymnasium
- Venue: Akita City Gymnasium, Akita, Japan
- Date: 19–21 August 2001
- Competitors: 12 from 6 nations
- Winning total: 19.586 points

Medalists
1st place, gold medalist(s)		Anna Mokhova; Yulia Lopatkina	Russia
2nd place, silver medalist(s)		Aline Van den Weghe; Elke Van Maldegem	Belgium
3rd place, bronze medalist(s)		Gemma Middleton; Amy Clarke	Great Britain

The women's pair competition at the 2001 World Games in Akita was played from 19 to 21 August. 12 acrobatic gymnastics competitors, from 6 nations, participated in the tournament. The acrobatic gymnastics competition took place at Akita City Gymnasium.

== Competition format ==
The top 4 teams in qualifications, based on combined scores of each round, advanced to the final. The scores in qualification do not count in the final.

== Results ==
=== Qualification ===
Rank	Country	Team	Balance	Tempo	Total	Note
1	Russia	Anna Mokhova; Yulia Lopatkina	18.309	18.836	37.145	Q
2	Belgium	Aline Van den Weghe; Elke Van Maldegem	18.222	17.573	35.795	Q
3	Lithuania	Julija Rybakova; Tatjana Resetova	18.039	17.406	35.445	Q
4	Great Britain	Gemma Middleton; Amy Clarke	17.156	17.519	34.675	Q
5	United States	Julie Dupree; Stella Duplass	17.492	16.559	34.051	
6	China	Shi Yuehua; Sun Guanglei	17.263	16.652	33.915	

=== Final ===
Rank	Country	Team	Points	Add	Total
1st place, gold medalist(s)	Russia	Anna Mokhova; Yulia Lopatkina	14.766	4.82	19.586
2nd place, silver medalist(s)	Belgium	Aline Van den Weghe; Elke Van Maldegem	14.300	3.56	17.860
3rd place, bronze medalist(s)	Great Britain	Gemma Middleton; Amy Clarke	14.132	3.30	17.432
4	Lithuania	Julija Rybakova; Tatjana Resetova	13.166	3.04	16.206
