= Trampoline gymnastics at the 2001 World Games – Women's tumbling =

Women's tumbling at the 2001 World Games
- Venue: Akita City Gymnasium, Akita, Japan
- Date: 19–21 August 2001
- Competitors: 4 from 4 nations

Medalists
gold medal	(Russia) Elena Bluyina
silver medal	(United Kingdom) Kathryn Peberdy
bronze medal	(Belarus) Anna Terenya

The women's tumbling competition in trampoline gymnastics at the 2001 World Games took place from 19 to 21 August 2001 at the Akita City Gymnasium in Akita, Japan.

== Competition format ==
A total of 4 athletes entered the competition. After a preliminary round, all of them qualified for the final. Preliminary round scores don't count in the final.

== Results ==
=== Preliminary ===
Rank	Athlete	Nation	Round 1	Round 2	Total
1	Jackie Rakiwska	United States	32.20	30.70	62.90
2	Kathryn Peberdy	(United Kingdom) Great Britain	32.40	30.20	62.60
3	Anna Terenya	Belarus	32.20	29.80	62.00
4	Elena Bluyina	Russia	32.40	27.00	59.40

=== Final ===
Rank	Athlete	Nation	Score
1st place, gold medalist(s)	Elena Bluyina	Russia	34.10
2nd place, silver medalist(s)	Kathryn Peberdy	(United Kingdom) Great Britain	33.70
3rd place, bronze medalist(s)	Anna Terenya	Belarus	33.00
4	Jackie Rakiwska	United States	30.70
