= Trampoline gymnastics at the 2001 World Games – Men's tumbling =

Men's tumbling at the 2001 World Games
- Venue: Akita City Gymnasium, Akita, Japan
- Date: 19–21 August 2001
- Competitors: 11 from 11 nations

Medalists
gold medal	(Russia) Levon Petrosian
silver medal	(South Africa) Tseko Mogotsi
bronze medal	(United Kingdom) Rob Small

The men's tumbling competition in trampoline gymnastics at the 2001 World Games took place from 19 to 21 August 2001 at the Akita City Gymnasium in Akita, Japan.

== Competition format ==
A total of 11 athletes entered the competition. The top eight athletes from the preliminary round qualify for the final.

== Results ==
=== Preliminary ===
Rank	Athlete	Nation	Round 1	Round 2	Total	Note
1	Tseko Mogotsi	South Africa	34.40	34.40	68.80	Q
2	Levon Petrosian	Russia	32.80	33.30	66.10	Q
3	Martin Jyde Nielsen	Denmark	32.10	32.30	64.40	Q
4	Rob Small	(United Kingdom) Great Britain	33.10	30.70	63.80	Q
5	Jared Olsen	United States	31.70	31.90	63.60	Q
6	Aleksander Brzozowski	Poland	32.40	30.90	63.30	Q
7	Vatzim Halubets	Belarus	31.40	30.60	62.00	Q
8	Hiroaki Nagasawa	Japan	32.00	29.70	61.70	Q
9	Nicolas Fournials	France	32.60	25.80	58.40	
10	Eduardo Mendes	Portugal	29.50	26.90	56.40	
	Andrey Dukhno	Kazakhstan	DNS			

=== Final ===
Rank	Athlete	Nation	Score
1st place, gold medalist(s)	Levon Petrosian	Russia	36.10
2nd place, silver medalist(s)	Tseko Mogotsi	South Africa	35.80
3rd place, bronze medalist(s)	Rob Small	(United Kingdom) Great Britain	33.60
4	Martin Jyde Nielsen	Denmark	33.00
5	Jared Olsen	United States	32.70
6	Vatzim Halubets	Belarus	31.20
7	Hiroaki Nagasawa	Japan	29.10
8	Aleksander Brzozowski	Poland	27.20
