= Trampoline gymnastics at the 2009 World Games – Women's double-mini trampoline =

Women's double-mini trampoline at the 2009 World Games
- Venue: Kaohsiung Arena, Kaohsiung, Chinese Taipei
- Date: 22 July 2009
- Competitors: 10 from 6 nations

Medalists
| gold medal | (Russia) Victoria Voronina |
| silver medal | (United States) Sarah Prosen |
| bronze medal | (United States) Aubree Balkan |

The women's double-mini trampoline competition in trampoline gymnastics at the 2009 World Games took place on 22 July 2009 at the Kaohsiung in Kaohsiung Arena, Chinese Taipei.

== Competition format ==
A total of 10 athletes entered the competition. Best 8 athletes from preliminary advances to the final.

== Results ==
=== Preliminary ===
| Rank | Athlete | Nation | Round 1 | Round 2 | Total | Note |
|---|---|---|---|---|---|---|
| 1 | Galina Goncharenko | Russia | 34.500 | 34.200 | 68.700 | Q |
| 2 | Sarah Prosen | United States | 34.000 | 34.400 | 68.400 | Q |
| 3 | Victoria Voronina | Russia | 34.800 | 33.200 | 68.000 | Q |
| 4 | Aubree Balkan | United States | 33.400 | 34.300 | 67.700 | Q |
| 5 | Corissa Boychuk | Canada | 34.800 | 32.100 | 66.900 | Q |
| 6 | Silvia Saiote | Portugal | 33.800 | 33.000 | 66.800 | Q |
| 7 | Andreia Robalo | Portugal | 33.600 | 33.100 | 66.700 | Q |
| 8 | Chelsea Nerpio | Canada | 32.000 | 33.100 | 65.100 | Q |
| 9 | Adeva Bryan | (United Kingdom) Great Britain | 32.900 | 31.700 | 64.600 | |
| 10 | Christie Jenkins | Australia | 30.200 | 33.100 | 63.300 | |

=== Final ===
| Rank | Athlete | Nation | Round 1 | Round 2 | Total |
|---|---|---|---|---|---|
| 1st place, gold medalist(s) | Victoria Voronina | Russia | 35.600 | 34.200 | 69.800 |
| 2nd place, silver medalist(s) | Sarah Prosen | United States | 32.700 | 33.000 | 65.700 |
| 3rd place, bronze medalist(s) | Aubree Balkan | United States | 32.800 | 32.700 | 65.500 |
| 4 | Chelsea Nerpio | Canada | 32.200 | 32.000 | 64.200 |
| 5 | Silvia Saiote | Portugal | 31.300 | 32.800 | 64.100 |
| 6 | Galina Goncharenko | Russia | 29.700 | 34.200 | 63.900 |
| 7 | Corissa Boychuk | Canada | 32.900 | 22.800 | 55.700 |
| 8 | Andreia Robalo | Portugal | 31.700 | 0.000 | 31.700 |
