= Trampoline gymnastics at the 2001 World Games – Men's double-mini trampoline =

Men's double-mini trampoline at the 2001 World Games
- Venue: Akita City Gymnasium, Akita, Japan
- Date: 19–21 August 2001
- Competitors: 10 from 10 nations

Medalists
gold medal	(Bulgaria) Radostin Rachev
silver medal	(Portugal) Diogo Faria
bronze medal	(Germany) Uwe Marquardt

The men's double-mini trampoline competition in trampoline gymnastics at the 2001 World Games took place from 19 to 21 August 2001 at the Akita City Gymnasium in Akita, Japan.

== Competition format ==
A total of 10 athletes entered the competition. Best eight athletes from preliminary round qualifies to the final.

== Results ==
=== Preliminary ===
Rank	Athlete	Nation	Round 1	Round 2	Total	Note
1	Chris Mitruk	Canada	32.10	32.10	64.20	Q
2	David Ford	United States	31.40	31.60	63.00	Q
3	Radostin Rachev	Bulgaria	31.50	31.20	62.70	Q
4	Justin Dougal	New Zealand	30.70	31.60	62.30	Q
5	Jonathon Dore	Australia	31.10	30.90	62.00	Q
6	Diogo Faria	Portugal	30.30	31.40	61.70	Q
7	Nils Melkerud	Sweden	29.90	31.40	61.30	Q
8	Uwe Marquardt	Germany	31.70	29.10	60.80	Q
9	Rodolfo Rangel	Brazil	31.50	21.60	53.10	
10	Mikinari Iizuka	Japan	30.10	0.00	30.10	

=== Final ===
Rank	Athlete	Nation	Score
1st place, gold medalist(s)	Radostin Rachev	Bulgaria	64.10
2nd place, silver medalist(s)	Diogo Faria	Portugal	63.60
3rd place, bronze medalist(s)	Uwe Marquardt	Germany	62.90
4	Nils Melkerud	Sweden	62.70
5	Chris Mitruk	Canada	62.70
6	David Ford	United States	62.30
7	Jonathon Dore	Australia	61.30
8	Justin Dougal	New Zealand	52.50
