= Aerobic gymnastics at the 2009 World Games – individual women =

The Individual Women event was held on July 25.

== Results ==
| Rank | Athlete | Nationality | Qualifiers | | Final | |
| Rank | Athlete | Nationality | Points | Rank | Points | Rank |
|---|---|---|---|---|---|---|
| 1st place, gold medalist(s) | Marcela Lopez | Brazil | 20.250 | 1 | 20.900 | 1 |
| 2nd place, silver medalist(s) | Angela McMillan | New Zealand | 20.050 | 4 | 20.600 | 2 |
| 3rd place, bronze medalist(s) | Huang Jinxuan | China | 20.150 | 2 | 20.150 | 3 |
| 4 | Cristina Simona Nedelcu | Romania | 19,850 | 5 | 19.900 | 4 |
| 5 | Giulia Bianchi | Italy | 20.050 | 3 | 19.350 | 5 |
| 6 | Elmira Dassaeva | Spain | 19.350 | 6 | 19.350 | 6 |
| 7 | Denitsa Parichkova | Bulgaria | 19.250 | 7 | | |
| 8 | Aurelia Joly | France | 18.700 | 8 | | |
