= Trampoline gymnastics at the 1981 World Games =

The trampoline gymnastics events of World Games I were held on July 29–30, 1981, at the San Jose Civic Auditorium in San Jose, California, in the United States. These were the first World Games, an international quadrennial multi-sport event, and were hosted by the city of Santa Clara. Athletes from the United States won 17 of the 23 trampoline medals awarded.

== Medalists ==
Event	Gold	Silver	Bronze
Men
Individual	Yves Milord (CAN)	Steve Elliott (USA)	Rand Wilson (USA)
Double mini trampoline	Brett Brown (CAN)	Karl Heger (USA)	Tim Cleave (CAN)
Synchronized	Carl Heger; Steve Elliot (USA)	Paul Rugheimer; Carlos Villarreal (USA)	Brett Brown; Alan Gauthier (CAN)
Tumbling	Steve Elliott (USA)	Randy Wickstrom (USA)	Steve Cooper (USA)
Women
Individual	Bethany Fairchild (USA)	Christine Tough (CAN); Barbara Letho (USA) (tie)	(precluded by tie for silver)
Double mini trampoline	Christine Tough (CAN)	Bethany Fairchild (USA)	Nora Letho (USA)
Synchronized	Norma Letho; Barbara Letho (USA)	Bethany Fairchild; Mary Borkowski (USA)	none
Tumbling	Angie Whiting (USA)	Kristi Laman (USA)	Stacey Hansen (USA)

== Details ==
=== Men ===
==== Individual ====
Compulsory and optional preliminaries –

1. Brett Brown, Canada, 57.7 2. Rand Wilson, USA, 55.3 3. Yves Milord, Canada, 54.7 4. Steve Elliot, USA, 54.4 5. Brock Wilson, USA, 51.8 6. Paul Rugheimer, USA, 48.8 7. Karl Heger, USA, 45.1 8. Alain Gauthier, Canada, 40.0 9. Roc Poulin, Canada, 34.1 10. Carlos Villarreal, USA, 29.4

Final –

1. Yves Milord, Canada. 2. Steve Elliott, USA 3. Rand Wilson, USA

==== Double mini trampoline ====
Preliminaries–

1. Steve Elliot, USA 2. Brett Brown, Canada 3. Carl Heger, USA 4. Tim Cleave, Canada 5. Carlos Villarreal, USA 6. Alan Gauthier, Canada 7. Mark Biech, Canada 8. Paul Rugheimer, USA

Final –

1. Brett Brown, Canada, 24.2 2. Karl Heger, USA, 24.0 3. Tim Cleave, Canada, 23.2 4. Mark Biech, Canada, 22.1 5. Carlos Villarreal, USA, 21.7 6. Alain Gauthier, Canada, 21.1 7. Steve Elliot, USA, 20.7 8. Paul Rugheimer, USA, 19.5.

==== Synchronized ====
Final –

1. Carl Heger/Steve Elliot, USA 2. Paul Rugheimer/Carlos Villarreal, USA 3. Brett Brown/Alan Gauthier, Canada.

==== Tumbling ====
Preliminaries –

1. Steve Elliot, USA, 33.80 2. Randy Wickstrom, USA, 31.38 3. Tim Cleave, Canada, 24.90 4. Steve Cooper, USA, 24.48 5. Carlos Villarreal, USA, 22.90 6. Ty Binfet, Canada, 21.20 7. Daryl Scheeler, Canada, 19.55 8. Carl Heger, USA, 11.10

Final –

1. Steve Elliott, USA 2. Randy Wickstrom, USA 3. Steve Cooper, USA

=== Women ===
==== Individual ====
Compulsory and optional preliminaries –

1. Norma Letho, USA, 58.5 2. Della Sheil, USA, 58.1 3. Barbara Letho, USA, 57.8 4. Beth Fairchild, USA, 57.5 5. Christine Tough, Canada, 57.1 6. Mary Borkowski, USA, 54.4

Final –

1. Bethany Fairchild, USA 2. Barbara Letho, USA and Christine Tough, Canada (tie)

==== Double mini trampoline ====
Preliminaries – 1. Christine Tough, Canada 2. Norma Letho, USA 3. Mary Borkowski, USA 4. Bethany Fairchild, USA 5. Chris Sullivan, USA 6. Barbara Lehtro, USA 7. Kay Davis, USA

Final – 1. Christine Tough, Canada, 22.5 2. Bethany Fairchild, USA, 22.4 3. Nora Letho, USA, 22.3 4. Mary Borkowski, USA, 21.9 5. Chris Sullivan, USA, 21.4 6. Barbara Letho, USA, 21.1 7. Jay Davis, USA, 20.4.

==== Synchronized ====
Final – 1. Norma Letho/Barbara Letho, USA 2. Bethany Fairchild/Mary Borkowski, USA

==== Tumbling ====
Preliminaries –

1. Angie Whiting, USA, 31.15 2. Kristi Laman, USA, 30.40 3. Stacey Hansen, USA, 28.45 4. Gina Garcia, USA, 23.47 5. Charlene Zowty, Canada, 23.10.6 Chris Patterson, USA, 22.60 7. Kay Davis, USA, 21.88 8. Jackie Blanchet, Canada, 19.80 9. Sherri Newman, USA, 18.60 10. Beverly Beres, Canada, 17.02 11. Jessica Knaff, USA, 16.63.

Final –

1. Angie Whiting, USA 2. Kristi Laman, USA 3. Stacey Hansen, USA
