= Acrobatic gymnastics at the 2001 World Games – Men's pair =

Men's pair at the 2001 World Games
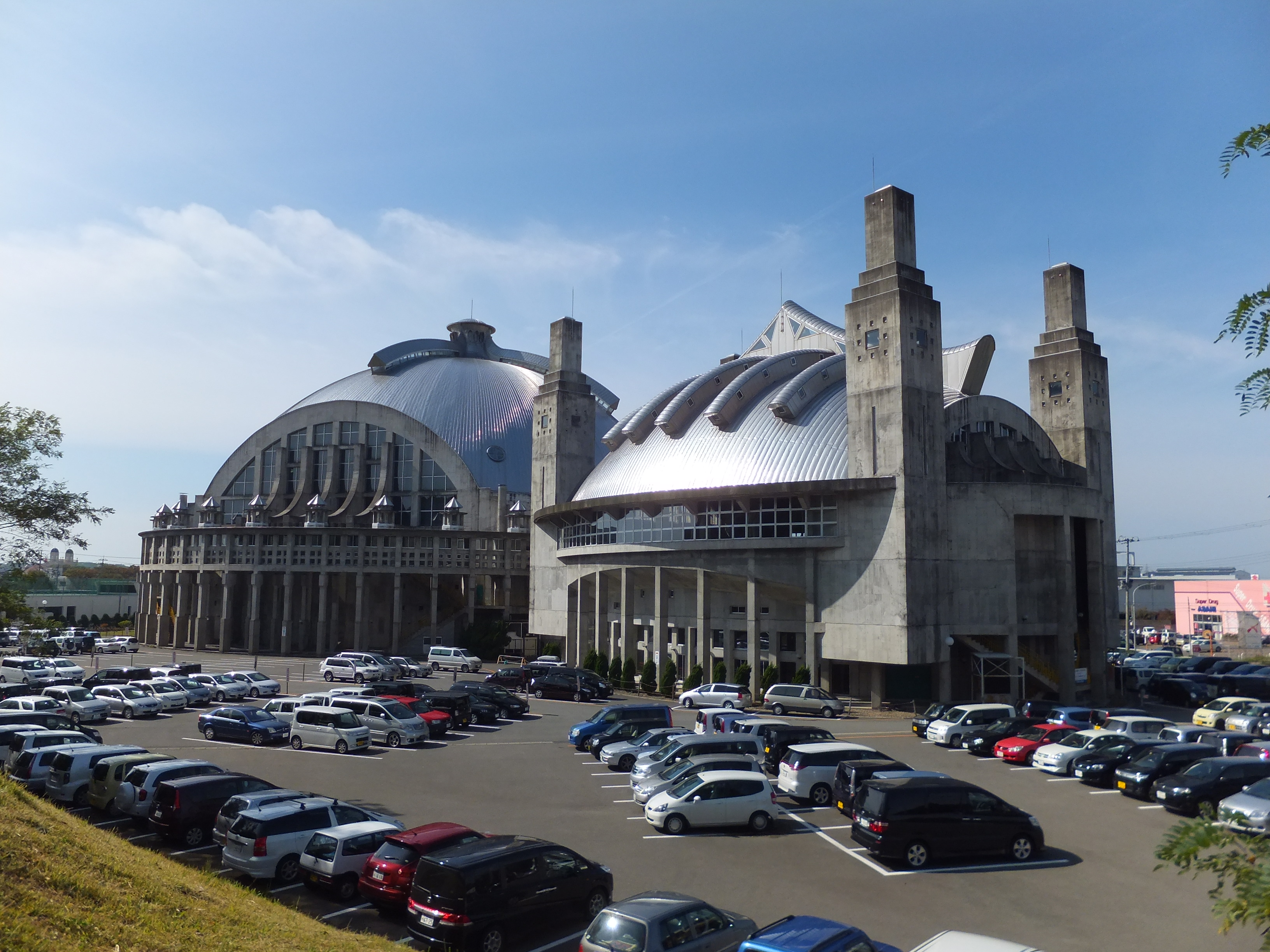
- Akita City Gymnasium
- Venue: Akita City Gymnasium, Akita, Japan
- Date: 19–21 August 2001
- Competitors: 12 from 6 nations
- Winning total: 20.766 points

Medalists
1st place, gold medalist(s)		Li Renjie; Song Min	China
2nd place, silver medalist(s)		Aleksandr Privalov; Ivan Poletaev	Russia
3rd place, bronze medalist(s)		Aliaksei Liubezny; Anatoli Baravikou	Belarus

The men's pair competition at the 2001 World Games in Akita was played from 19 to 21 August. 12 acrobatic gymnastics competitors, from 6 nations, participated in the tournament. The acrobatic gymnastics competition took place at Akita City Gymnasium.

== Competition format ==
The top 4 teams in qualifications, based on combined scores of each round, advanced to the final. The scores in qualification do not count in the final.

== Results ==
=== Qualification ===
Rank	Country	Team	Balance	Tempo	Total	Note
1	China	Li Renjie; Song Min	20.009	17.939	37.948	Q
2	Russia	Aleksandr Privalov; Ivan Poletaev	19.022	18.339	37.361	Q
3	Belarus	Aliaksei Liubezny; Anatoli Baravikou	18.506	18.153	36.659	Q
4	Poland	Marcin Drabicki; Dariusz Nowak	18.369	16.296	34.665	Q
5	Portugal	Ivo Vilaca; Nuno Vidal	16.623	15.886	32.509	
6	Great Britain	Carl Morritt; Chris Jones	17.786	14.380	32.166	

=== Final ===
Rank	Country	Team	Points	Add	Total
1st place, gold medalist(s)	China	Li Renjie; Song Min	14.666	6.10	20.766
2nd place, silver medalist(s)	Russia	Aleksandr Privalov; Ivan Poletaev	14.466	4.96	19.426
3rd place, bronze medalist(s)	Belarus	Aliaksei Liubezny; Anatoli Baravikou	14.099	4.60	18.699
4	Poland	Marcin Drabicki; Dariusz Nowak	13.833	4.64	18.173
