= Aerobic gymnastics at the 2009 World Games – group men =

The Group Men event was held on July 25, 2009, as a part of Aerobic Gymnastics.

== Results ==
Rank	Team	Qualifiers		Final	
Rank	Team	Points	Rank	Points	Rank
1st place, gold medalist(s)	China	21.150	1	20.850	1
2nd place, silver medalist(s)	Romania	20.339	2	20.742	2
3rd place, bronze medalist(s)	Russia	19.250	6	20.000	3
4	France	19.318	4	19.410	4
5	Hungary	19.557	3	19.394	5
6	Italy	19.263	5	18.581	6
7	Japan	17.921	7		
8	Germany	17.389	8		
