= Aerobic gymnastics at the 2009 World Games – pairs mixed =

The Pairs Mixed event was held on July 24.

== Results ==
Rank	Diver	Nationality	Qualifiers		Final	
Rank	Diver	Nationality	Points	Rank	Points	Rank
1st place, gold medalist(s)	Julien Chaninet; Aurelie Joly	France	20.650	1	20.750	1
2nd place, silver medalist(s)	Vicente Lli; Sara Moreno	Spain	19.250	5	20.375	2
3rd place, bronze medalist(s)	Shijian He; Jinxuan Huang	China	20.050	2	20.350	3
4	Mircea Brinzea; Cristina Antonescu	Romania	19.300	4	20.300	4
5	Danila Shokhin; Evgenia Anisimova	Russia	19.750	3	19.900	5
6	Tiago Faquinha; Elena Luana Rosca	Portugal	18.900	6	18.850	6
7	Marcisnei Oliveira; Juliana Antero	Brazil	18.100	7		
8	Lai Wan-Chen; Yi-chun Liu	Chinese Taipei	16.000	8		
