= Aerobic gymnastics at the 2001 World Games – Trio =

Trio at the World Games
- Venue: Akita City Gymnasium, Akita, Japan
- Date: 17–18 August 2001
- Competitors: 24 from 8 nations
- Winning total: 16.280 points

Medalists
1st place, gold medalist(s)		Grégory Alcan; Xavier Julien; Olivier Salvan	France
2nd place, silver medalist(s)		Remus Nicolai; Claudiu Varlam; Cristian Moldovan	Romania
3rd place, bronze medalist(s)		Ludmila Kovatcheva; Galina Lazarova; Krassimira Dotzeva	Bulgaria

The trio competition in aerobic gymnastics at the 2001 World Games in Akita was played from 17 to 18 August. The aerobic gymnastics competition took place at Akita City Gymnasium.

== Competition format ==
A total of 8 teams entered the competition. Only final was held.

== Results ==
Rank	Country	Team	Score
1st place, gold medalist(s)	France	Grégory Alcan; Xavier Julien; Olivier Salvan	16.280
2nd place, silver medalist(s)	Romania	Remus Nicolai; Claudiu Varlam; Cristian Moldovan	16.100
3rd place, bronze medalist(s)	Bulgaria	Ludmila Kovatcheva; Galina Lazarova; Krassimira Dotzeva	15.812
4	Russia	Sergei Ivanov; Vasiliy Kozirev; Victor Shchov	15.200
5	New Zealand	Kelly Aitken; Joanna Aitken; Danica Aitken	14.818
6	Chile	Carolina Chacon; Jean Olivares; Christian Olivares	14.772
7	South Korea	Choi Young-han; Choi In-young; Kim Ki-sung	14.322
8	Japan	Kiyofumi Yamamoto; Hisaki Sato; Naoki Ichikawa	12.350
