= Aerobic gymnastics at the 2009 World Games – individual men =

The Individual Men event was held on July 24.

== Results ==
| Rank | Athlete | Nationality | Qualifiers | | Final | |
| Rank | Athlete | Nationality | Points | Rank | Points | Rank |
|---|---|---|---|---|---|---|
| 1st place, gold medalist(s) | Ivan Parejo | Spain | 20.250 | 4 | 21.050 | 1 |
| 2nd place, silver medalist(s) | Morgan Jacquemin | France | 20.200 | 5 | 20.900 | 2 |
| 3rd place, bronze medalist(s) | Alexander Kondratichev | Russia | 20.650 | 2 | 20.600 | 3 |
| 4 | Jinping Ao | China | 20.350 | 3 | 20.550 | 4 |
| 5 | Mircea Zamfir | Romania | 20.900 | 1 | 20.550 | 5 |
| 6 | Emanuele Pagliuca | Italy | 20.025 | 6 | 20.100 | 6 |
| 7 | Zsolt Roik | Hungary | 19.750 | 7 | | |
| 8 | Matthew Levy | South Africa | 14.275 | 8 | | |
