= Trampoline gymnastics at the 2009 World Games – Men's double-mini trampoline =

Competition at the 2009 World Games

Men's double-mini trampoline at the 2009 World Games
- Venue: Kaohsiung Arena, Kaohsiung, Chinese Taipei
- Date: 22 July 2009
- Competitors: 9 from 9 nations

Medalists
gold medal	(Russia) Kirill Ivanov
silver medal	(Portugal) André Lico
bronze medal	(Germany) Nico Gärtner

The men's double-mini trampoline competition in trampoline gymnastics at the 2009 World Games took place on 22 July 2009 at the Kaohsiung in Kaohsiung Arena, Chinese Taipei.

== Competition format ==
A total of 9 athletes entered the competition. Best 8 athletes from preliminary advances to the final.

== Results ==
=== Preliminary ===
Rank	Athlete	Nation	Round 1	Round 2	Total	Note
1	Kirill Ivanov	Russia	36.600	36.500	73.100	Q
2	Bruno Martini	Brazil	35.700	36.500	72.200	Q
3	Ty Swadling	Australia	35.900	35.700	71.600	Q
4	André Lico	Portugal	33.700	36.600	70.300	Q
5	Philip Dodson	(United Kingdom) Great Britain	33.600	35.100	68.700	Q
6	Lucky Radebe	South Africa	33.000	35.100	68.100	Q
7	Nico Gärtner	Germany	34.700	33.300	68.000	Q
8	Alexander Seifert	Canada	33.600	34.300	67.900	Q
9	Austin White	United States	33.100	34.200	67.300	

=== Final ===
Rank	Athlete	Nation	Round 1	Round 2	Total
1st place, gold medalist(s)	Kirill Ivanov	Russia	38.300	38.100	76.400
2nd place, silver medalist(s)	André Lico	Portugal	38.300	37.400	75.700
3rd place, bronze medalist(s)	Nico Gärtner	Germany	35.800	34.200	70.000
4	Ty Swadling	Australia	35.000	33.800	68.800
5	Philip Dodson	(United Kingdom) Great Britain	31.100	34.200	65.300
6	Alexander Seifert	Canada	35.200	28.500	63.700
7	Lucky Radebe	South Africa	34.300	29.100	63.400
8	Bruno Martini	Brazil	24.900	35.500	60.400
