= Aerobic gymnastics at the 2001 World Games – Women's individual =

Women's individual at the World Games
- Venue: Akita City Gymnasium, Akita, Japan
- Date: 17–18 August 2001
- Competitors: 8 from 8 nations
- Winning total: 16.680 points

Medalists
1st place, gold medalist(s)		Izabela Lăcătuș	Romania
2nd place, silver medalist(s)		Ludmila Kovatcheva	Bulgaria
3rd place, bronze medalist(s)		Giovanna Lecis	Italy

The women's individual competition in aerobic gymnastics at the 2001 World Games in Akita was played from 17 to 18 August. The competition took place at Akita City Gymnasium.

== Competition format ==
A total of 8 athletes entered the competition. Only final was held.

== Results ==
Rank	Nation	Athlete	Score
1st place, gold medalist(s)	Romania	Izabela Lăcătuș	16.680
2nd place, silver medalist(s)	Bulgaria	Ludmila Kovatcheva	16.350
3rd place, bronze medalist(s)	Italy	Giovanna Lecis	15.300
4	Chile	Sandra Arriagada	15.050
5	Japan	Yuriko Ito	15.050
6	Spain	Monica Hontoria	14.150
7	Germany	Janka Daubner	14.150
8	South Korea	Kang Me-hee	14.050
