= Aerobic gymnastics at the 2001 World Games – Men's individual =

Men's individual at the World Games
- Venue: Akita City Gymnasium, Akita, Japan
- Date: 17–18 August 2001
- Competitors: 7 from 7 nations
- Winning total: 19.100 points

Medalists
1st place, gold medalist(s)		Jonatan Cañada	Spain
2nd place, silver medalist(s)		Park Kwang-soo	South Korea
3rd place, bronze medalist(s)		Grégory Alcan	France

The men's individual competition at the 2001 World Games in Akita was played from 17 to 18 August. The aerobic gymnastics competition took place at Akita City Gymnasium.

== Competition format ==
A total of 7 athletes entered the competition. Only final was held.

== Results ==
Rank	Nation	Athlete	Score
1st place, gold medalist(s)	Spain	Jonatan Cañada	19.100
2nd place, silver medalist(s)	South Korea	Park Kwang-soo	18.020
3rd place, bronze medalist(s)	France	Grégory Alcan	18.000
4	Iceland	Halldor Birgir Johansson	16.780
5	Romania	Cristian Moldovan	16.500
6	Australia	Stuart Fisher	16.250
7	Japan	Hiroyuki Ueda	14.750
