= Trampoline gymnastics at the 2001 World Games – Women's double-mini trampoline =

Women's double-mini trampoline at the 2001 World Games
- Venue: Akita City Gymnasium, Akita, Japan
- Date: 19–21 August 2001
- Competitors: 11 from 11 nations

Medalists
gold medal	(Bulgaria) Teodora Sinilkova
silver medal	(Australia) Jacinta Harford
bronze medal	(Belgium) Ilse Despriet

The women's double-mini trampoline competition in trampoline gymnastics at the 2001 World Games took place from 19 to 21 August 2001 at the Akita City Gymnasium in Akita, Japan.

== Competition format ==
A total of 11 athletes entered the competition. Best eight athletes from preliminary round qualifies to the final.

== Results ==
=== Preliminary ===
Rank	Athlete	Nation	Round 1	Round 2	Total	Note
1	Irina Vassilieva	Russia	30.80	31.10	61.90	Q
2	Teodora Sinilkova	Bulgaria	30.90	31.00	61.90	Q
3	Jacinta Harford	Australia	30.40	31.10	61.50	Q
4	Tara Sewell	United States	30.40	30.80	61.20	Q
5	Ilse Despriet	Belgium	30.40	30.80	61.20	Q
6	Kylie McNaughton	New Zealand	30.00	30.70	60.70	Q
7	Sachie Saito	Japan	30.30	30.30	60.60	Q
8	Kathrin Deuner	Germany	29.70	30.80	60.50	Q
9	Lisa Colussi-Mitruk	Canada	30.50	30.00	60.50	
10	Sabrina Teixeira	Portugal	0.00	31.40	31.40	
	Viviane Trindade	Brazil	DNS			

=== Final ===
Rank	Athlete	Nation	Round 1	Round 2	Total
1st place, gold medalist(s)	Teodora Sinilkova	Bulgaria	31.20	31.10	62.30
2nd place, silver medalist(s)	Jacinta Harford	Australia	30.80	31.30	62.10
3rd place, bronze medalist(s)	Ilse Despriet	Belgium	31.00	30.60	61.60
4	Sachie Saito	Japan	30.50	30.70	61.20
5	Irina Vassilieva	Russia	30.70	30.30	61.00
6	Kylie McNaughton	New Zealand	30.40	30.40	60.80
7	Tara Sewell	United States	29.40	31.20	60.60
8	Kathrin Deuner	Germany	30.20	0.00	30.20
