= Aerobic gymnastics at the 2009 World Games – trio men =

The Trio Men event was held on July 25.

== Results ==
Rank	Athlete	Nationality	Qualifiers		Final	
Rank	Athlete	Nationality	Points	Rank	Points	Rank
1st place, gold medalist(s)	Mircea Brinzea; Tudorel-Valentin Mavrodineanu; Mircea Zamfir	Romania	21.150	1	21.550	1
2nd place, silver medalist(s)	Tao Le; Che Lei; Zhang Peng	China	21.150	1	20.600	2
3rd place, bronze medalist(s)	Benjamin Garavel; Nicolas Garavel; Morgan Jacquemin	France	20.500	3	21.300	3
4	Alexander Kondratichev; Anton Shishigin; Arseny Tikhomirov	Russia	20.150	6	20.250	4
5	Antonio Caforio; Vito Aiai; Emanuele Pagliuca	Italy	19.500	6	19.750	5
6	Phuong Nguyen; Dong Vu; Thuaha Tran	Vietnam	20.181	4	19.565	6
7	Chang Chin-Ya; Hsu Shu-Miao; Wan-Chen Lai	Chinese Taipei	17.905	7		
