= David Scott (gymnast) =

Scottish gymnast (1874–1959)

- Born: 15 July 1874 Edinburgh, Scotland
- Died: 19 April 1959 (aged 84) Reading, England

Gymnastics career
- Discipline: Men's artistic gymnastics
- Country represented: (United Kingdom) Great Britain

David Scott (15 July 1874 – 19 April 1959) was a Scottish gymnast. He competed in the men's team all-around event at the 1908 Summer Olympics.
