= Russia at the World Games =

- IOC code: RUS
- Medals Ranked 4th: Gold 126 Silver 104 Bronze 69 Total 299

World Games appearances (overview)
- 1981; 1985; 1989; 1993; 1997; 2001; 2005; 2009; 2013; 2017; 2022

Other related appearances
- Individual Neutral Athletes (2025)

Russia first participated at the World Games in 1993, after the dissolution of the Soviet Union in 1991. Previously, Russian athletes competed as part of the Soviet Union at the World Games 1989.

== Medals by World Games ==
Games	Gold	Silver	Bronze	Total
(Netherlands) 1993 The Hague	1	2	1	4
(Finland) 1997 Lahti	11	9	11	31
(Japan) 2001 Akita	24	15	5	44
(Germany) 2005 Duisburg	27	19	11	57
(Chinese Taipei) 2009 Kaohsiung	18	14	15	47
(Colombia) 2013 Cali	17	24	12	53
(Poland) 2017 Wrocław	28	21	14	63
Totals (7 entries)	126	104	69	299

== Medalists ==
=== The Hague 1993 ===
Medal	Name	Sport	Event
Gold	Igor Striyanov; Vladimir Lebedov	Acrobatic gymnastics	Men's pairs
Silver	Natalya Rumyantseva	Water skiing	Women's slalom
Silver	Natalya Rumyantseva	Water skiing	Women's tricks
Bronze	Alexei Kryzhanovskiy	Trampoline	Tumbling individual

=== Lahti 1997 ===
Medal	Name	Sport	Event
Gold	Denis Pirogov; Maksim Vlasov; Aleksandr Maikrov; Oleg Ivanov	Acrobatic gymnastics	Men's groups
Gold	Anna Mokhova; Yulia Lopatkina	Acrobatic gymnastics	Women's pairs
Gold	Elvira Zaliayeva; Svetlana Kushu; Yelena Avakeliyan	Acrobatic gymnastics	Women's groups
Gold	Sofiya Galiyulina; Dmitriy Kukva	Acrobatic gymnastics	Mixed pairs
Gold	Tatiana Solovyova; Vladislav Oksnar	Aerobic gymnastics	Mixed pairs
Gold	Aleksandr Nechitaylo	Fin swimming	Men's 100 m
Gold	Aleksandr Nechitaylo	Fin swimming	Men's 200 m
Gold	Aleksandr Nechitaylo	Fin swimming	Men's 50 m
Gold	Sergei Achapov; Sergei Dokuchayev; Maksim Maksimov; Aleksandr Nechitaylo	Fin swimming	Men's 4 × 100 m relay
Gold	Sergei Achapov; Sergei Dokuchayev; Maksim Maksimov; Aleksandr Nechitaylo	Fin swimming	Men's 4 × 200 m relay
Gold	Vladimir Ignatenkov	Trampoline	Men's tumbling individual
Silver	Denis Belikov; Stanislav Marchenkov; Vadim Michaylov	Aerobic gymnastics	Mixed trios
Silver	Stanislav Marchenkov	Aerobic gymnastics	Men's individual
Silver	Olga Rumyantseva	Aerobic gymnastics	Women's individual
Silver	Sergei Achapov	Fin swimming	Men's 100 m
Silver	Sergei Achapov	Fin swimming	Men's 200 m
Silver	Svetlana Gancha; Oxana Koroleva; Natalya Musychenko; Yuliya Chirikova	Fin swimming	Women's 4 × 100 m relay
Silver	Svetlana Gancha	Fin swimming	Women's 50 m
Silver	Svetlana Gancha; Oxana Koroleva; Natalya Musychenko; Yuliya Chirikova	Fin swimming	Women's 4 × 200 m relay
Silver	Svetlana Gancha	Fin swimming	Women's 100 m immersion
Bronze	Sergei Achapov	Fin swimming	Men's 50 m
Bronze	Sergei Dokuchayev	Fin swimming	Men's 400 m
Bronze	Sergei Dokuchayev	Fin swimming	Men's 100 immersion m
Bronze	Sergei Dokuchayev	Fin swimming	Men's 50 m apnea
Bronze	Svetlana Gancha	Fin swimming	Women's 100 m
Bronze	Natalya Musychenko	Fin swimming	Women's 200 m
Bronze	Oxana Koroleva	Fin swimming	Women's 400 m
Bronze	Yuliya Chirikova	Fin swimming	Women's 50 m apnea
Bronze	Natalya Borisenko	Trampoline	Women's tumbling individual
Bronze	Aleksandr Danilchenko	Trampoline	Men's individual
Bronze	Yelena Milakova	Water skiing	Women's tricks

=== Akita 2001 ===
Medal	Name	Sport	Event
Gold	Aleksey Shcherbakov; Vadinm Galkin; Aleksey Ermichkin; Dmitriy Bulkin	Acrobatic gymnastics	Men's groups
Gold	Anna Mokhova; Yuliya Lopatkina	Acrobatic gymnastics	Women's pairs
Gold	Svetlana Kushu; Yelena Avakeliyan; Yekaterina Lusenko	Acrobatic gymnastics	Women's groups
Gold	Polina Lymareva; Andrey Yakovlev	Acrobatic gymnastics	Mixed pairs
Gold	Tatiana Solovyova; Vladislav Oksner	Aerobic gymnastics	Mixed pairs
Gold	Yevgeny Skorzhenko	Fin swimming	Men's 100 m
Gold	Sergei Achapov	Fin swimming	Men's 200 m
Gold	Ilya Somov; Yevgeny Skorzhenko; Sergei Achapov; Maksim Maksimov	Fin swimming	Men's 4 × 100 m relay
Gold	Yevgeny Skorzhenko	Fin swimming	Men's 50 m apnea
Gold	Anastasiya Glukhikh	Fin swimming	Women's 200 m
Gold	Yelena Gracheva	Fin swimming	Women's 400 m
Gold	Tatiana Komarova; Lidiya Goryacheva; Irina Yegoruchkina; Anastasiya Kochneva	Fin swimming	Women's 4 × 100 m relay
Gold	Anastasiya Kochneva	Fin swimming	Women's 50 m apnea
Gold	Viktor Furazhkin	Powerlifting	Men's −90 kg
Gold	Maria Kudinova	Powerlifting	Women's −67.5 kg
Gold	Svetlana Miklashevich	Powerlifting	Women's +67.5 kg
Gold	Irina Chaschina	Rhythmic gymnastics	Rope
Gold	Irina Chaschina	Rhythmic gymnastics	Hoop
Gold	Irina Chaschina	Rhythmic gymnastics	Ball
Gold	Irina Chaschina	Rhythmic gymnastics	Clubs
Gold	Aleksandr Moskalenko; German Khnychev	Trampoline	Men's synchro
Gold	Leovn Petrosiyan	Trampoline	Men's tumbling individual
Gold	Yelena Bluyina	Trampoline	Women's tumbling individual
Gold	Yelena Milakova	Water skiing	Women's three event
Silver	Aleksandr Privalov; Ivan Poletayev	Acrobatic gymnastics	Men's pairs
Silver	Anna Bezikova; Dmitry Timokhin	Dance sport	Latin
Silver	Sergei Achapov	Fin swimming	Men's 100 m
Silver	Tatiana Komarova	Fin swimming	Women's 100 m
Silver	Lidiya Goryacheva	Fin swimming	Women's 200 m
Silver	Anastasiya Glukhikh	Fin swimming	Women's 400 m
Silver	Tatiana Komarova	Fin swimming	Women's 50 m apnea
Silver	Konstantin Pavlov	Powerlifting	Men's −67.5 kg
Silver	Andrey Tarasenko	Powerlifting	Men's −90 kg
Silver	Irina Abramova	Powerlifting	Women's −67.5 kg
Silver	Natalya Payusova	Powerlifting	Women's +67.5 kg
Silver	Leisan Utyasheva	Rhythmic gymnastics	Rope
Silver	Leisan Utyasheva	Rhythmic gymnastics	Hoop
Silver	Leisan Utyasheva	Rhythmic gymnastics	Ball
Silver	Leisan Utyasheva	Rhythmic gymnastics	Clubs
Bronze	Ilya Somov	Fin swimming	Men's 200 m
Bronze	Ilya Somov	Fin swimming	Men's 400 m
Bronze	Mikhail Andryukhin	Powerlifting	Men's −67.5 kg
Bronze	Sergei Mor	Powerlifting	Men's −90 kg
Bronze	Irina Karavayeva; Natalya Chernova	Trampoline	Women's synchro

=== Duisburg 2005 ===
Medal	Name	Sport	Event
Gold	Ervin Mednikov; Aleksey Mochechkin	Acrobatic gymnastics	Men's pairs
Gold	Anna Melnikova; Yanna Cholayeva	Acrobatic gymnastics	Women's pairs
Gold	Tatyana Alekseyeva; Yelena Moiseyeva; Yelena Kirilova	Acrobatic gymnastics	Women's pairs
Gold	Anna Katchalova; Revaz Gurgenidze	Acrobatic gymnastics	Mixed pairs
Gold	Andrei Burakov	Fin swimming	Men's 100 m
Gold	Pavel Kabanov	Fin swimming	Men's 200 m
Gold	Nikolai Reznikov	Fin swimming	Men's 400 m
Gold	Andrei Burakov; Yevgeny Skorzhenko; Aleksandr Panyutin; Pavel Kabanov	Fin swimming	Men's 4 × 100 m relay
Gold	Yevgeny Skorzhenko	Fin swimming	Men's 50 m apnea
Gold	Vasilisa Kravchuk	Fin swimming	Women's 200 m
Gold	Valentina Artemieva; Svetlana Dedyukh; Anastasiya Glukhikh; Vasilisa Kravchuk	Fin swimming	Men's 4 × 100 m relay
Gold	Anastasiya Glukhikh	Fin swimming	Women's 50 m apnea
Gold	Islamutdin Eldaruchev	Karate	Men's kumite -80 kg
Gold	Aleksandr Guerunov	Karate	Men's kumite +80 kg
Gold	Aleksandr Guerunov	Karate	Men's kumite open
Gold	Aleksandr Pechekhonov	Mountaineering	Men's speed
Gold	Anna Saulevich	Mountaineering	Women's speed
Gold	Ravil Kazakov	Powerlifting	Men's -67.5 kg
Gold	Andrei Tarasenko	Powerlifting	Men's -90 kg
Gold	Nikolai Suslov	Powerlifting	Men's +90 kg
Gold	Olesya Lafina	Powerlifting	Women's -52 kg
Gold	Marina Kudinova	Powerlifting	Women's +67.5 kg
Gold	Olga Kapranova	Rhythmic gymnastics	Ball
Gold	Olga Kapranova	Rhythmic gymnastics	Clubs
Gold	Vera Sesina	Rhythmic gymnastics	Ribbon
Gold	Svetlana Panteleyeva	Sumo	Women's -80 kg
Gold	Olesya Kovalenko	Sumo	Women's open
Silver	Olga Sbitneva; Ivan Yudin	Dance sports	Rock'n'Roll
Silver	Nikolai Reznikov	Fin swimming	Men's 200 m
Silver	Vasilisa Kravchuk	Fin swimming	Women's 100 m
Silver	Valentina Artemieva	Fin swimming	Women's 200 m
Silver	Yekaterina Politko	Fin swimming	Women's 400 m
Silver	Aleksei Veselovzorov	Ju jitsu	Men's -94 kg
Silver	Yuri Kalashnikov	Karate	Men's kumite -60 kg
Silver	Sergei Sinitsyn	Mountaineering	Men's speed
Silver	Sergei Detkov; Tatyana Ryabkina; Maksim Davydov; Aliya Sitdikova	Orienteering	Mixed relay
Silver	Vasily Korotkov; Alexei Minaev; Vadim Niyazov; Yevgeni Stashchenko; Aleksandr Kvochur	Parachuting	4-way formation skydiving
Silver	Viktor Furazhkin	Powerlifting	Men's -90 kg
Silver	Galina Karpova	Powerlifting	Women's +67.5 kg
Silver	Vera Sesina	Rhythmic gymnastics	Rope
Silver	Igor Kurinnoy	Sumo	Men's -85 kg
Silver	Yekaterina Salakhova	Sumo	Women's -65 kg
Silver	Olesya Kovalenko	Sumo	Women's +80 kg
Silver	Aleksandr Rusakov; Aleksandr Leven	Trampoline	Men's synchro
Silver	Irina Karavayeva; Natalya Kolesnikova	Trampoline	Women's synchro
Silver	Anna Korobeynikova	Trampoline	Women's tumbling individual
Bronze	Sergei Shetinin; Igor Zarudniy; Aleksandr Chemodanov; Artem Trifonov	Acrobatic gymnastics	Men's groups
Bronze	Sergey Konstantinov	Aerobic gymnastics	Men's individual
Bronze	Lyubov Bogdanova; Danila Shokhin; Pavel Grishin	Aerobic gymnastics	Mixed trios
Bronze	Aleksandr Panyutin	Fin swimming	Men's 100 m
Bronze	Sayguidmagomed Shakhrudinov	Karate	Men's kumite -70 kg
Bronze	Yevgeniy Vaitsekhovskiy	Mountaineering	Men's speed
Bronze	Tatyana Ruyga	Mountaineering	Women's speed
Bronze	Vera Sesina	Rhythmic gymnastics	Ball
Bronze	David Tsallagov	Sumo	Men's -115 kg
Bronze	Yekaterina Keyb	Sumo	Women's open
Bronze	Aleksandr Skorodumov	Trampoline	Men's tumbling individual
