= 1993 World Games =

Multi-sport event in The Hague, Netherlands

World Games IV IV Wereldspelen
- Host city: The Hague, Netherlands
- Nations: 44
- Athletes: 1,265
- Events: 155 (23 sports)
- Opening: 22 July 1993
- Closing: 2 August 1993
- Opened by: Queen Beatrix of the Netherlands
- Main venue: Zuiderpark Stadion

The 1993 World Games (Dutch: 1993 Wereldspelen), the fourth World Games, were an international multi-sport event held in The Hague, Netherlands.

== Titles ==
155 titles were awarded in 23 sports (not including invitational sports — aikido, equestrian vaulting, indoor tug of war, baton twirling and barefoot waterski).

Sport	Titles	Notes
Acrobatic gymnastics	15	
Beach volleyball	2	
Bodybuilding	7	
Boules	2	
Bowling	3	
Casting	13	
Field archery	6	
Fistball	1	
Finswimming	14	
Karate	12	
Korfball	1	
Life saving	16	
Netball	1	
Powerlifting	6	
Racquetball	2	
Roller hockey	1	
Roller skating, artistic	4	
Roller speed skating	10	
Sambo	9	
Taekwondo	12	
Trampoline	6	
Triathlon	4	
Tug of war	2	
Water skiing	6	
Total	155	

== Medal table ==
The medal tally during the fourth World Games is as follows. Germany finished at the top of the final medal table. There were two gold medals (and zero silver medals) awarded in five of the acrobatic gymnastics events because of ties for first place. There were two bronze medals awarded in the karate kumite (10) and taekwondo (12) events and one of the acrobatic gymnastics events.

* Host nation (Netherlands)

Rank	Nation	Gold	Silver	Bronze	Total
1	Germany (GER)	21	19	15	55
2	Italy (ITA)	14	19	6	39
3	Great Britain (GBR)	12	5	9	26
4	United States (USA)	11	11	12	34
5	France (FRA)	11	10	15	36
6	Bulgaria (BUL)	10	1	7	18
7	Netherlands (NED)*	9	5	16	30
8	Sweden (SWE)	8	10	10	28
9	Russia (RUS)	7	8	2	17
10	China (CHN)	5	2	2	9
11	South Korea (KOR)	4	2	1	7
12	Belarus (BLR)	4	1	5	10
13	Japan (JPN)	4	0	1	5
14	Belgium (BEL)	3	5	4	12
15	Norway (NOR)	3	4	7	14
16	Czech Republic (CZE)	3	3	3	9
17	Spain (ESP)	3	2	6	11
18	Denmark (DEN)	3	0	5	8
19	Poland (POL)	3	0	0	3
20	Finland (FIN)	2	6	6	14
21	Australia (AUS)	2	4	5	11
22	Chinese Taipei (TPE)	2	3	1	6
23	Estonia (EST)	2	3	0	5
24	Mexico (MEX)	2	2	1	5
25	Switzerland (SUI)	2	1	1	4
26	Ukraine (UKR)	1	5	1	7
27	Ireland (IRL)	1	2	0	3
28	Canada (CAN)	1	1	8	10
29	Hungary (HUN)	1	1	5	7
30	Kazakhstan (KAZ)	1	1	1	3
30	New Zealand (NZL)	1	1	1	3
32	Singapore (SIN)	1	1	0	2
33	Portugal (POR)	1	0	2	3
34	Brazil (BRA)	1	0	1	2
35	Mongolia (MGL)	1	0	0	1
36	Lithuania (LTU)	0	3	3	6
37	Egypt (EGY)	0	2	2	4
38	Turkey (TUR)	0	2	0	2
39	Argentina (ARG)	0	1	2	3
39	Austria (AUT)	0	1	2	3
41	South Africa (RSA)	0	1	1	2
42	Latvia (LAT)	0	1	0	1
42	Malaysia (MAS)	0	1	0	1
44	Morocco (MAR)	0	0	3	3
45	Iran (IRI)	0	0	1	1
45	Jamaica (JAM)	0	0	1	1
45	Jordan (JOR)	0	0	1	1
45	Kuwait (KUW)	0	0	1	1
45	Nigeria (NGR)	0	0	1	1
45	Philippines (PHI)	0	0	1	1
Totals (50 entries)		160	150	178	488
