= Lifesaving at the 2001 World Games – Women's 50 m manikin carry =

Lifesaving – women's 50 m manikin carry at the 2001 World Games
- Venue: Akita Prefectural Pool, Akita, Japan
- Date: 25 August 2001
- Competitors: 26 from 9 nations

Medalists
gold medal	(Australia) Leigh Habler
silver medal	(Belgium) Aurélie Goffin
bronze medal	(Italy) Isabella Cerquozzi

The women's 50 m manikin carry in lifesaving at the 2001 World Games took place on 25 August 2001 at the Akita Prefectural Pool in Akita, Japan.

== Competition format ==
A total of 26 athletes entered the competition. The best nine athletes from preliminary round qualifies to the final.

== Results ==
=== Preliminary ===
Rank	Athlete	Nation	Time	Note
1	Leigh Habler	Australia	39.37	Q
2	Aurélie Goffin	Belgium	40.70	Q
3	Isabella Cerquozzi	Italy	40.76	Q
4	Barbara Bindella	Italy	40.84	Q
5	Jana Pescheck	Germany	40.86	Q
6	Steffy Eckers	Germany	40.90	Q
7	Daniela Schmutzer	Germany	40.97	Q
8	Kate McLellan	Australia	41.05	Q
9	Monique Driessen	Netherlands	41.48	Q
10	Immacolata Esposito	Italy	41.79	
11	Elisabet Masergas	Spain	42.13	
12	Gabby Moses	Australia	42.26	
13	Jo Hocking	(United Kingdom) Great Britain	42.63	
14	Carlien Schryvershof	Netherlands	42.93	
15	Bronwyn Baumgart	South Africa	43.15	
16	Carolina Beneyto	Spain	43.18	
17	Claudine Roemen	Netherlands	43.28	
18	Emily Gleaves	(United Kingdom) Great Britain	43.62	
19	Candice Crafford	South Africa	44.49	
20	Elena de Prada	Spain	44.77	
21	Kikue Ashizawa	Japan	45.29	
22	Ann Quirijnen	Belgium	45.95	
23	Stacey Bowley	South Africa	46.22	
24	Yuumi Inagaki	Japan	46.90	
25	Kozue Fujiwara	Japan	47.72	
26	Samantha Eagle	(United Kingdom) Great Britain	47.82	

=== Final ===
Rank	Athlete	Nation	Time
1st place, gold medalist(s)	Leigh Habler	Australia	38.88
2nd place, silver medalist(s)	Aurélie Goffin	Belgium	39.99
3rd place, bronze medalist(s)	Isabella Cerquozzi	Italy	40.05
4	Monique Driessen	Netherlands	40.47
5	Kate McLellan	Australia	40.48
6	Jana Pescheck	Germany	40.79
7	Barbara Bindella	Italy	40.96
8	Steffy Eckers	Germany	40.99
9	Daniela Schmutzer	Germany	41.10
