= Lifesaving at the 2001 World Games – Women's 200 m obstacle swim =

Lifesaving – women's 200 m obstacle swim at the 2001 World Games
- Venue: Akita Prefectural Pool, Akita, Japan
- Date: 24 August 2001
- Competitors: 25 from 9 nations

Medalists
gold medal	(Australia) Kate Krywulycz
silver medal	(Belgium) Bieke Vandenabeele
bronze medal	(South Africa) Stacey Bowley

The women's 200 m rescue medley in lifesaving at the 2001 World Games took place on 24 August 2001 at the Akita Prefectural Pool in Akita, Japan.

== Competition format ==
A total of 25 athletes entered the competition. The best nine athletes from preliminary round qualifies to the final.

== Results ==
=== Preliminary ===
Rank	Athlete	Nation	Time	Note
1	Stacey Bowley	South Africa	2:16.27	Q
2	Bieke Vandenabeele	Belgium	2:16.50	Q
3	Candice Crafford	South Africa	2:16.68	Q
4	Kate Krywulycz	Australia	2:16.74	Q
5	Aurélie Goffin	Belgium	2:18.97	
6	Marcella Prandi	Italy	2:19.89	Q
7	Jenna Worlock	South Africa	2:20.90	Q
8	Carolina Beneyto	Spain	2:21.23	Q
9	Sandra Temmerman	Netherlands	2:22.32	Q
10	Julia Hübner	Germany	2:22.86	Q
11	Barbara Bindella	Italy	2:22.91	
12	Karla Gilbert	Australia	2:23.30	
13	Emily Gleaves	(United Kingdom) Great Britain	2:24.31	
14	Gabby Moses	Australia	2:24.41	
15	Rebecca Rowe	(United Kingdom) Great Britain	2.25.80	
16	Isabella Cerquozzi	Italy	2:27.34	
17	Samantha Eagle	(United Kingdom) Great Britain	2:27.41	
18	Concepcion Escatllar	Spain	2:27.66	
19	Steffy Eckers	Germany	2:28.18	
20	Fukiko Sato	Japan	2:28.42	
21	Alexandra Berlin	Germany	2:28.73	
22	Yuumi Inagaki	Japan	2:35.21	
23	Kikue Ashizawa	Japan	2:37.91	
24	Carlien Schryvershof	Netherlands	2:39.90	
25	Esther Koolmees	Netherlands	2:46.50	

=== Final ===
Rank	Athlete	Nation	Time
1st place, gold medalist(s)	Kate Krywulycz	Australia	2:13.01
2nd place, silver medalist(s)	Bieke Vandenabeele	Belgium	2:13.43
3rd place, bronze medalist(s)	Stacey Bowley	South Africa	2:13.74
4	Candice Crafford	South Africa	2:16.08
5	Jenna Worlock	South Africa	2:20.14
6	Marcella Prandi	Italy	2:20.39
7	Carolina Beneyto	Spain	2:20.94
8	Sandra Temmerman	Netherlands	2:22.60
9	Julia Hübner	Germany	2:25.33
