= Lifesaving at the 2001 World Games =

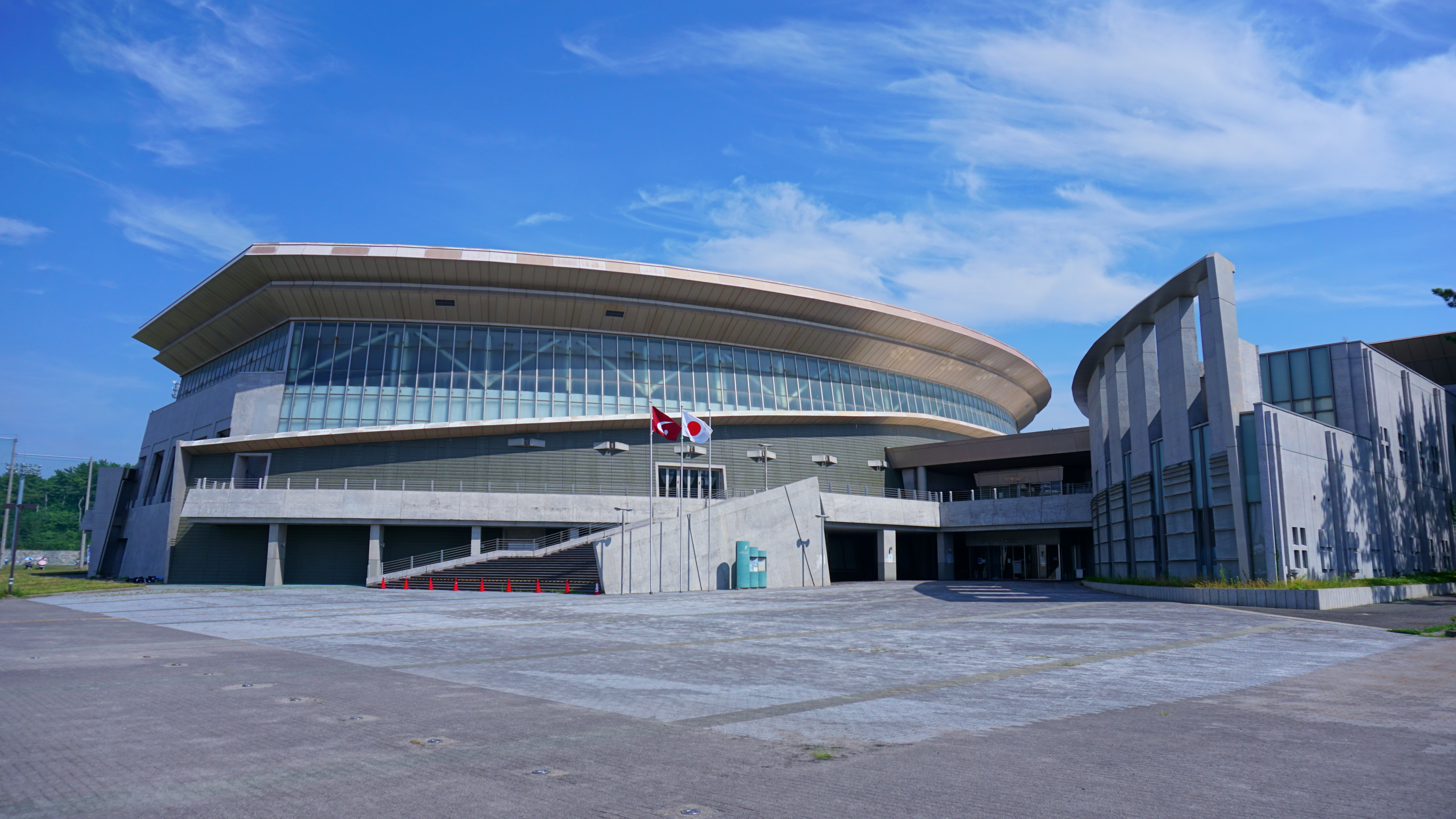
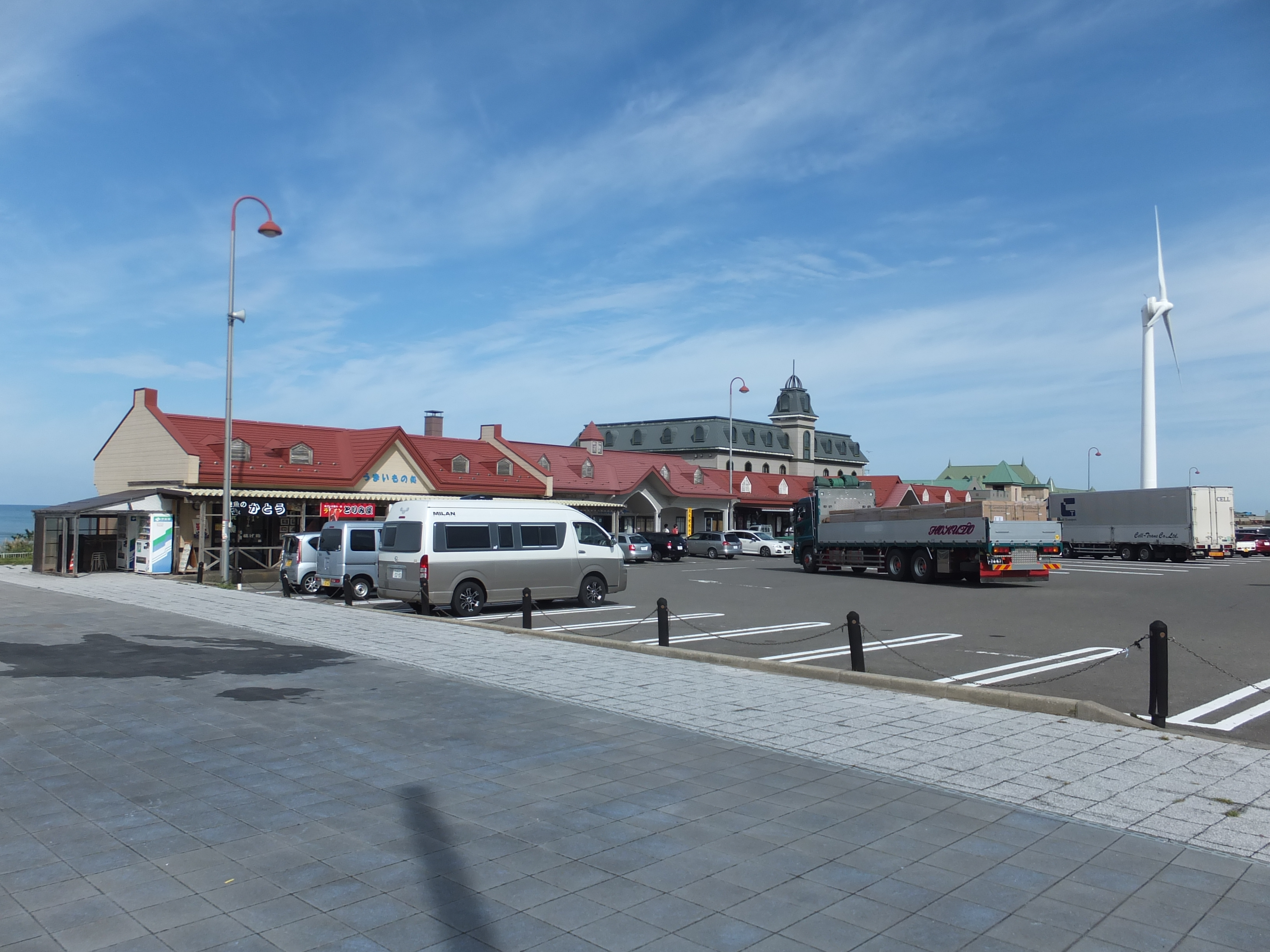
- Akita Prefectural Pool and Iwaki Island Park
- Venues: Akita Prefectural Pool (pool); Iwaki Island Park (beach)
- Dates: 24–26 August 2001
- Competitors: 90 from 9 nations

The lifesaving events at the 2001 World Games in Akita was played between 24 and 26 August. 90 athletes from 9 nations participated in the tournament. The competition took place in Akita Prefectural Pool for pool events and in Iwaki Island Park for beach events. For both men and women, there were four individual events in pool lifesaving, three individual events in beach lifesaving, and an overall team event combining five non-medal team and relay events in pool and beach disciplines.

== Participating nations ==
- Australia (10)
- Belgium (9)
- Germany (10)
- Great Britain (10)
- Italy (10)
- Japan (10)
- Netherlands (10)
- South Africa (10)
- Spain (11)

== Medal table ==
Rank	Nation	Gold	Silver	Bronze	Total
1	Australia	9	5	3	17
2	Spain	2	1	0	3
3	South Africa	1	5	4	10
4	Germany	1	2	3	6
5	Belgium	1	2	1	4
6	Italy	1	1	3	5
7	Japan	1	0	2	3
Totals (7 entries)		16	16	16	48

== Events ==
=== Men ===
Event	Gold	Silver	Bronze
50 m manikin carry	Pablo Terradillos; Spain	Jason O'Pray; Australia	Stephen Short; Australia
100 m manikin carry with fins	Jason O'Pray; Australia	Maik Hofmann; Germany	Matt Bouman; South Africa
100 m rescue medley	Lutz Heimann; Germany	Jason O'Pray; Australia	Stephen Short; Australia
200 m obstacle swim	Roel Jansen; Belgium	Stephen Short; Australia	Germano Proietti; Italy
Beach flags	Sergio González; Spain	Waleed Damon; South Africa	Hidenobu Tadano; Japan
Board race	Zane Holmes; Australia	Ryan Butcher; South Africa	Matt Bouman; South Africa
Surf race	Zane Holmes; Australia	Matt Bouman; South Africa	Germano Proietti; Italy
Team overall (Note: The overall team event combined results in five non-medal team events to determine the final ranking: 4x50m obstacle relay, 4x25m manikin carry, 4x50m rescue tube relay, rescue tube race and board rescue race.)	South Africa; Matt Bouman; Ryan Butcher; Waleed Damon; Gary Kurth; Graeme Willcox	Australia; Zane Holmes; Ky Hurst; Jason O'Pray; Stephen Short; Luke Turner	Germany; Lutz Heimann; Maik Hofmann; Thorsten Laurent; Matthias Löwenberg; Carsten Schlepphorst

=== Women ===
Event	Gold	Silver	Bronze
50 m manikin carry	Leigh Habler; Australia	Aurélie Goffin; Belgium	Isabella Cerquozzi; Italy
100 m manikin carry with fins	Paola Zago; Italy	Marcella Prandi; Italy	Alexandra Berlin; Germany
100 m rescue medley	Leigh Habler; Australia	Jana Pescheck; Germany	Aurélie Goffin; Belgium
200 m obstacle swim	Kate Krywulycz; Australia	Bieke Vandenabeele; Belgium	Stacey Bowley; South Africa
Beach flags	Masami Yusa; Japan	Rosa González; Spain	Kozue Fujiwara; Japan
Board race	Karla Gilbert; Australia	Gabby Moses; Australia	Jenna Worlock; South Africa
Surf race	Karla Gilbert; Australia	Candice Crafford; South Africa	Kate Krywulycz; Australia
Team overall (Note: The overall team event combined results in five non-medal team events to determine the final ranking: 4x50m obstacle relay, 4x25m manikin carry, 4x50m rescue tube relay, rescue tube race and board rescue race.)	Australia; Karla Gilbert; Leigh Habler; Kate Krywulycz; Kate McLellan; Gabby Moses	South Africa; Bronwyn Baumgart; Stacey Bowley; Candice Crafford; Tracey Martheze; Jenna Worlock	Germany; Alexandra Berlin; Steffy Eckers; Julia Hübner; Jana Pescheck; Daniela Schmutzer
