= Lifesaving at the 2001 World Games – Women's 100 m rescue medley =

Lifesaving – women's 100 m rescue medley at the 2001 World Games
- Venue: Akita Prefectural Pool, Akita, Japan
- Date: 24 August 2001
- Competitors: 25 from 9 nations

Medalists
gold medal	(Australia) Leigh Habler
silver medal	(Germany) Jana Pescheck
bronze medal	(Belgium) Aurélie Goffin

The women's 100 m rescue medley in lifesaving at the 2001 World Games took place on 24 August 2001 at the Akita Prefectural Pool in Akita, Japan.

== Competition format ==
A total of 25 athletes entered the competition. The best nine athletes from preliminary round qualifies to the final.

== Results ==
=== Preliminary ===
Rank	Athlete	Nation	Time	Note
1	Aurélie Goffin	Belgium	1:20.83	Q
2	Jana Pescheck	Germany	1:21.18	Q
3	Leigh Habler	Australia	1:21.23	Q
4	Isabella Cerquozzi	Italy	1:22.09	Q
5	Kate McLellan	Australia	1:22.11	Q
6	Steffy Eckers	Germany	1:22.35	Q
7	Marcella Prandi	Italy	1:22.98	Q
8	Julia Hübner	Germany	1:23.59	Q
9	Immacolata Esposito	Italy	1:23.88	Q
10	Monique Driessen	Netherlands	1:23.89	
11	Elisabet Masergas	Spain	1:24.59	
12	Carolina Beneyto	Spain	1:25.00	
13	Candice Crafford	South Africa	1:25.02	
14	Claudine Roemen	Netherlands	1:25.61	
15	Bronwyn Baumgart	South Africa	1:26.11	
16	Gabby Moses	Australia	1:26.25	
17	Carlien Schryvershof	Netherlands	1:26.67	
18	Jo Hocking	(United Kingdom) Great Britain	1:26.75	
19	Emily Gleaves	(United Kingdom) Great Britain	1:29.06	
20	Kikue Ashizawa	Japan	1:30.05	
21	Ann Quirijnen	Belgium	1:30.58	
22	Emma De-Schoolmeester	(United Kingdom) Great Britain	1:31.57	
23	Tracey Martheze	South Africa	1:37.53	
24	Kozue Fujiwara	Japan	1:37.89	
25	Yuumi Inagaki	Japan	1:38.81	

=== Final ===
Rank	Athlete	Nation	Time
1st place, gold medalist(s)	Leigh Habler	Australia	1:18.74
2nd place, silver medalist(s)	Jana Pescheck	Germany	1:20.14
3rd place, bronze medalist(s)	Aurélie Goffin	Belgium	1:21.91
4	Isabella Cerquozzi	Italy	1:22.19
5	Steffy Eckers	Germany	1:22.90
6	Kate McLellan	Australia	1:23.24
7	Marcella Prandi	Italy	1:23.75
8	Julia Hübner	Germany	1:23.94
9	Immacolata Esposito	Italy	1:24.68
