= Lifesaving at the 2001 World Games – Women's 100 m manikin carry with fins =

Lifesaving – women's 100 m manikin carry with fins at the 2001 World Games
- Venue: Akita Prefectural Pool, Akita, Japan
- Date: 25 August 2001
- Competitors: 24 from 9 nations

Medalists
gold medal	(Italy) Paola Zago
silver medal	(Italy) Marcella Prandi
bronze medal	(Germany) Alexandra Berlin

The women's 100 m manikin carry with fins in lifesaving at the 2001 World Games took place on 25 August 2001 at the Akita Prefectural Pool in Akita, Japan.

== Competition format ==
A total of 24 athletes entered the competition. The best nine athletes from preliminary round qualifies to the final.

== Results ==
=== Preliminary ===
Rank	Athlete	Nation	Time	Note
1	Marcella Prandi	Italy	1:01.54	Q
2	Paola Zago	Italy	1:02.03	Q
3	Alexandra Berlin	Germany	1:02.87	Q
4	Sandra Temmerman	Netherlands	1:03.69	Q
5	Daniela Schmutzer	Germany	1:04.10	Q
6	Jana Pescheck	Germany	1:04.67	Q
7	Bronwyn Baumgart	South Africa	1:04.69	Q
8	Barbara Bindella	Italy	1:05.05	Q
9	Kate McLellan	Australia	1:05.42	Q
10	Monique Driessen	Netherlands	1:05.79	
11	Kate Krywulycz	Australia	1:06.27	
12	Leigh Habler	Australia	1:06.59	
13	Elena de Prada	Spain	1:06.80	
14	Claudine Roemen	Netherlands	1:07.03	
15	Concepcion Escatllar	Spain	1:07.05	
16	Emma De-Schoolmester	(United Kingdom) Great Britain	1:07.97	
17	Ellen Callens	Belgium	1:11.38	
18	Samantha Eagle	(United Kingdom) Great Britain	1:11.46	
19	Candice Crafford	South Africa	1:12.05	
20	Tracey Martheze	South Africa	1:12.20	
21	Yuumi Inagaki	Japan	1:21.87	
22	Kikue Ashizawa	Japan	1:22.88	
23	Fukiko Sato	Japan	1:31.73	
	Rebecca Rowe	(United Kingdom) Great Britain	DSQ	

=== Final ===
Rank	Athlete	Nation	Time
1st place, gold medalist(s)	Paola Zago	Italy	1:01.12
2nd place, silver medalist(s)	Marcella Prandi	Italy	1:01.40
3rd place, bronze medalist(s)	Alexandra Berlin	Germany	1:02.46
4	Sandra Temmerman	Netherlands	1:03.58
5	Daniela Schmutzer	Germany	1:04.23
6	Barbara Bindella	Italy	1:04.40
7	Jana Pescheck	Germany	1:04.45
8	Bronwyn Baumgart	South Africa	1:04.73
9	Kate McLellan	Australia	1:05.50
