= Lifesaving at the 2001 World Games – Women's board race =

Lifesaving – women's board race at the 2001 World Games
- Venue: Iwaki Island Park, Iwaki, Japan
- Date: 26 August 2001
- Competitors: 26 from 9 nations

Medalists
gold medal	(Australia) Karla Gilbert
silver medal	(Australia) Gabby Moses
bronze medal	(South Africa) Jenna Worlock

The women's board race in lifesaving at the 2001 World Games took place on 26 August 2001 at the Iwaki Island Park in Iwaki, Japan.

== Competition format ==
A total of 26 athletes entered the competition. The best eight athletes from each heat advances to the final.

== Results ==
=== Heats ===
Heat 1

Rank	Athlete	Nation	Note
1	Gabby Moses	Australia	Q
2	Karla Gilbert	Australia	Q
3	Steffy Eckers	Germany	Q
4	Concepcion Escatllar	Spain	Q
5	Monique Driessen	Netherlands	Q
6	Isabella Cerquozzi	Italy	Q
7	Emma De-Schoolmester	(United Kingdom) Great Britain	Q
8	Emily Gleaves	(United Kingdom) Great Britain	Q
9	Elena de Prada	Spain	
10	Ellen Callens	Belgium	
11	Bronwyn Baumgart	South Africa	
12	Kikue Ashizawa	Japan	
13	Immacolata Esposito	Italy	

Heat 2

Rank	Athlete	Nation	Note
1	Leigh Habler	Australia	Q
2	Jenna Worlock	South Africa	Q
3	Fukiko Sato	Japan	Q
4	Julia Hübner	Germany	Q
5	Stacey Bowley	South Africa	Q
6	Yuumi Inagaki	Japan	Q
7	Aurélie Goffin	Belgium	Q
8	Rebecca Rowe	(United Kingdom) Great Britain	Q
9	Marcella Prandi	Italy	
10	Ann Quirijnen	Belgium	
11	Claudine Roemen	Netherlands	
12	Sandra Temmerman	Netherlands	
13	Alexandra Berlin	Germany	

=== Final ===
Rank	Athlete	Nation
1st place, gold medalist(s)	Karla Gilbert	Australia
2nd place, silver medalist(s)	Gabby Moses	Australia
3rd place, bronze medalist(s)	Jenna Worlock	South Africa
4	Leigh Habler	Australia
5	Stacey Bowley	South Africa
6	Fukiko Sato	Japan
7	Concepcion Escatllar	Spain
8	Steffy Eckers	Germany
9	Julia Hübner	Germany
10	Emma De-Schoolmester	(United Kingdom) Great Britain
	Monique Driessen	Netherlands
	Aurélie Goffin	Belgium
	Emily Gleaves	(United Kingdom) Great Britain
	Yuumi Inagaki	Japan
	Rebecca Rowe	(United Kingdom) Great Britain
	Isabella Cerquozzi	Italy
