= Finswimming at the 2001 World Games – Women's 50 m apnoea =

Finswimming – women's 50 m apnoea at the 2001 World Games
- Venue: Akita Prefectural Pool, Akita, Japan
- Date: 24 August 2001
- Competitors: 18 from 11 nations

Medalists
gold medal	(Russia) Anastassia Kochneva
silver medal	(Russia) Tatiana Komarova
bronze medal	(China) Zhu Baozhen

The women's 50 m apnoea competition in finswimming at the 2001 World Games took place on 24 August 2001 at the Akita Prefectural Pool in Akita, Japan.

== Competition format ==
A total of 18 athletes entered the competition. The best eight athletes from preliminary round qualifies to the final.

== Results ==
=== Preliminary ===
Rank	Athlete	Nation	Time	Note
1	Anastassia Kochneva	Russia	16.97	Q
2	Liu Qi	China	17.40	Q
3	Zhu Baozhen	China	17.63	Q
4	Tatiana Komarova	Russia	18.11	Q
5	Lee Ji-eun	South Korea	18.74	Q
6	Beatrix Erdody	Hungary	18.82	Q
7	Yayoi Sakamoto	Japan	18.84	Q
8	Helena Kocourková	Czech Republic	18.97	Q
9	Tina Hirschfeldt	Germany	18.99	
10	Ran Ogata	Japan	19.21	
11	Ivonne Bohada	Colombia	19.50	
12	Rosalina Buis	Netherlands	19.75	
13	Christine Müller	Germany	19.83	
14	Olga Loginova	Estonia	20.18	
15	Juliet Tompkins	New Zealand	20.64	
16	Michaela Simaicová	Czech Republic	20.68	
17	Lee Hye-min	South Korea	21.01	
18	Marina Nagy	Hungary	21.61	

=== Final ===
Rank	Athlete	Nation	Time
1st place, gold medalist(s)	Anastassia Kochneva	Russia	17.37
2nd place, silver medalist(s)	Tatiana Komarova	Russia	17.55
3rd place, bronze medalist(s)	Zhu Baozhen	China	17.56
4	Liu Qi	China	17.76
5	Yayoi Sakamoto	Japan	18.45
6	Beatrix Erdody	Hungary	18.47
7	Lee Ji-eun	South Korea	18.80
8	Helena Kocourková	Czech Republic	19.23
