= Finswimming at the 2001 World Games – Women's 200 m surface =

International sporting event in Akita, Japan

Finswimming – women's 200 m surface at the 2001 World Games
- Venue: Akita Prefectural Pool, Akita, Japan
- Date: 24 August 2001
- Competitors: 16 from 9 nations

Medalists
gold medal	(Russia) Anastassia Glukhikh
silver medal	(Russia) Lidia Goriacheva
bronze medal	(Germany) Suzanne Jentzsch

The women's 200 m surface competition in finswimming at the 2001 World Games took place on 24 August 2001 at the Akita Prefectural Pool in Akita, Japan.

== Competition format ==
A total of 16 athletes entered the competition. The best eight athletes from preliminary round qualifies to the final.

== Results ==
=== Preliminary ===
Rank	Athlete	Nation	Time	Note
1	Lidia Goriacheva	Russia	1:38.65	Q
2	Anastassia Glukhikh	Russia	1:38.84	Q
3	Suzanne Jentsch	Germany	1:40.34	Q
4	Li Qingping	China	1:40.49	Q
5	Hana Vykoukalová	Czech Republic	1:41.93	Q
6	Petra Hostinska	Czech Republic	1:42.02	Q
7	Wu Xiaohui	China	1:42.08	Q
8	Bettina Müller	Germany	1:42.27	Q
9	Viktoria Pikaly	Hungary	1:42.94	
10	Hajnalka Debreczeni	Hungary	1:43.00	
11	Kamila David	Austria	1:43.48	
12	Chun Sung-sun	South Korea	1:43.68	
13	Cho Ju-hee	South Korea	1:45.47	
14	Ran Ogata	Japan	1:45.97	
15	Maria Hernandez	Colombia	1:46.63	
16	Yumiko Sagehashi	Japan	1:49.40	

=== Final ===
Rank	Athlete	Nation	Time
1st place, gold medalist(s)	Anastassia Glukhikh	Russia	1:36.87
2nd place, silver medalist(s)	Lidia Goriacheva	Russia	1:37.00
3rd place, bronze medalist(s)	Suzanne Jentsch	Germany	1:37.94
4	Wu Xiaohui	China	1:39.72
5	Li Qingping	China	1:40.09
6	Hana Vykoukalová	Czech Republic	1:42.02
7	Petra Hostinska	Czech Republic	1:42.06
8	Bettina Müller	Germany	1:43.76
