= Lifesaving at the 2001 World Games – Men's 100 m manikin carry with fins =

Lifesaving – men's 100 m manikin carry with fins at the 2001 World Games
- Venue: Akita Prefectural Pool, Akita, Japan
- Date: 25 August 2001
- Competitors: 27 from 9 nations

Medalists
gold medal	(Australia) Jason O'Pray
silver medal	(Germany) Maik Hofmann
bronze medal	(South Africa) Matt Bouman

The men's 100 m manikin carry with fins in lifesaving at the 2001 World Games took place on 25 August 2001 at the Akita Prefectural Pool in Akita, Japan.

== Competition format ==
A total of 27 athletes entered the competition. The best nine athletes from preliminary round qualifies to the final.

== Results ==
=== Preliminary ===
Rank	Athlete	Nation	Time	Note
1	Maik Hofmann	Germany	52.81	Q
2	Jason O'Pray	Australia	53.01	Q
3	Matthew Bouman	South Africa	53.96	Q
4	Lutz Heimann	Germany	54.43	Q
5	Federico Mastrostefano	Italy	54.57	Q
6	Stuart Snell	(United Kingdom) Great Britain	54.61	Q
7	Federico De Marco	Italy	54.64	Q
8	Danilo Mollari	Italy	54.87	Q
9	Luke Turner	Australia	55.03	Q
10	Carsten Schlepphorst	Germany	55.24	
11	Vincent Honet	Belgium	55.84	
12	Pablo Terradillos	Spain	55.85	
13	Jonathan del Amo	Spain	56.32	
14	Ryan Cox	(United Kingdom) Great Britain	57.47	
15	Francisco Jiménez	Spain	57.79	
16	Geert Meesen	Netherlands	58.54	
17	Hugo Byman	Netherlands	59.46	
18	Freek Lemmens	Belgium	59.57	
19	Ky Hurst	Australia	59.86	
20	Graeme Willcox	South Africa	1:00.13	
21	Gary Kurth	South Africa	1:03.15	
22	Futoshi Kikuchi	Japan	1:03.76	
23	Masahiro Hayashi	Japan	1:11.58	
24	Kengo Amagai	Japan	1:15.02	
25	Bart Geerts	Belgium	1:16.44	
	Craig Robinson	(United Kingdom) Great Britain	DSQ	
	Hans Vyge	Netherlands	DSQ	

=== Final ===
Rank	Athlete	Nation	Time
1st place, gold medalist(s)	Jason O'Pray	Australia	52.96
2nd place, silver medalist(s)	Maik Hofmann	Germany	52.97
3rd place, bronze medalist(s)	Matthew Bouman	South Africa	53.06
4	Danilo Mollari	Italy	53.68
5	Luke Turner	Australia	53.84
6	Lutz Heimann	Germany	53.86
7	Federico De Marco	Italy	53.96
8	Federico Mastrostefano	Italy	54.43
9	Stuart Snell	(United Kingdom) Great Britain	55.59
