= Lifesaving at the 2001 World Games – Women's surf race =

Lifesaving – women's surf race at the 2001 World Games
- Venue: Iwaki Island Park, Iwaki, Japan
- Date: 26 August 2001
- Competitors: 26 from 9 nations

Medalists
gold medal	(Australia) Karla Gilbert
silver medal	(South Africa) Candice Crafford
bronze medal	(Australia) Kate Krywulycz

The women's surf race in lifesaving at the 2001 World Games took place on 26 August 2001 at the Iwaki Island Park in Iwaki, Japan.

== Competition format ==
A total of 26 athletes entered the competition.

== Results ==
Rank	Athlete	Nation
1st place, gold medalist(s)	Karla Gilbert	Australia
2nd place, silver medalist(s)	Candice Crafford	South Africa
3rd place, bronze medalist(s)	Kate Krywulycz	Australia
4	Kate McLellan	Australia
5	Stacey Bowley	South Africa
6	Jenna Worlock	South Africa
7	Concepcion Escatllar	Spain
8	Carolina Beneyto	Spain
9	Jo Hocking	(United Kingdom) Great Britain
	Kikue Ashizawa	Japan
	Barbara Bindella	Italy
	Emily Gleaves	(United Kingdom) Great Britain
	Isabella Cerquozzi	Italy
	Sandra Temmerman	Netherlands
	Steffy Eckers	Germany
	Marcella Prandi	Italy
	Claudine Roemen	Netherlands
	Carline Schryvershof	Netherlands
	Fukiko Sato	Japan
	Yuumi Inagaki	Japan
	Jana Pescheck	Germany
	Bieke Vandenabeele	Belgium
	Julia Hübner	Germany
	Rebecca Rowe	(United Kingdom) Great Britain
	Ann Quirijnen	Belgium
	Aurélie Goffin	Belgium
