= Finswimming at the 2001 World Games – Women's 400 m surface =

International sporting event in Akita, Japan

Finswimming – women's 400 m surface at the 2001 World Games
- Venue: Akita Prefectural Pool, Akita, Japan
- Date: 25 August 2001
- Competitors: 15 from 9 nations

Medalists
gold medal	(Russia) Elena Gracheva
silver medal	(Russia) Anastassia Glukhikh
bronze medal	(Germany) Bettina Müller

The women's 400 m surface competition in finswimming at the 2001 World Games took place on 25 August 2001 at the Akita Prefectural Pool in Akita, Japan.

== Competition format ==
A total of 15 athletes entered the competition. The best eight athletes from the preliminary round qualifies to the final.

== Results ==
=== Preliminary ===
Rank	Athlete	Nation	Time	Note
1	Wang Yan	China	3:34.22	Q
2	Elena Gracheva	Russia	3:34.34	Q
3	Hana Vykoukalová	Czech Republic	3:37.83	Q
4	Bettina Müller	Germany	3:37.95	Q
5	Anastassia Glukhikh	Russia	3:37.96	Q
6	Michaela Simaicová	Czech Republic	3:38.35	Q
7	Christine Müller	Germany	3:38.60	Q
8	Chun Sung-sun	South Korea	3:38.72	Q
9	Wu Xiaohui	China	3:42.59	
10	Cho Ju-hee	South Korea	3:45.40	
11	Hajnalka Debreczeni	Hungary	3:45.42	
12	Maria Hernandez	Colombia	3:49.02	
13	Marina Nagy	Hungary	3:53.17	
14	Nicole Voet	Netherlands	3:57.19	
	Azusa Kamio	Japan	DNS	

=== Final ===
Rank	Athlete	Nation	Time
1st place, gold medalist(s)	Elena Gracheva	Russia	3:27.27
2nd place, silver medalist(s)	Anastassia Glukhikh	Russia	3:33.81
3rd place, bronze medalist(s)	Bettina Müller	Germany	3:35.21
4	Hana Vykoukalová	Czech Republic	3:35.74
5	Christine Müller	Germany	3:38.70
6	Chun Sung-sun	South Korea	3:40.56
7	Michaela Simaicová	Czech Republic	3:43.10
8	Wang Yan	China	3:44.73
