= Finswimming at the 2001 World Games – Men's 400 m surface =

Finswimming – men's 400 m surface at the 2001 World Games
- Venue: Akita Prefectural Pool, Akita, Japan
- Date: 24 August 2001
- Competitors: 15 from 10 nations

Medalists
gold medal	(Germany) Sven Gallasch
silver medal	(Hungary) Gergely Juhos
bronze medal	(Russia) Ilya Somov

The men's 400 m surface competition in finswimming at the 2001 World Games took place on 24 August 2001 at the Akita Prefectural Pool in Akita, Japan.

== Competition format ==
A total of 15 athletes entered the competition. The best eight athletes from preliminary round qualifies to the final.

== Results ==
=== Preliminary ===
Rank	Athlete	Nation	Time	Note
1	Sven Gallasch	Germany	3:18.16	Q
2	Gergely Juhos	Hungary	3:19.40	Q
3	Wojciech Dorożyński	Poland	3:20.39	Q
4	Lukáš Rada	Czech Republic	3:20.43	Q
5	Sven Kaiser	Germany	3:24.65	Q
6	Hu Hailong	China	3:24.98	Q
7	Ilya Somov	Russia	3:25.32	Q
8	Daniel Guevara	Colombia	3:25.51	Q
9	Di Qing	China	3:25.54	
10	Makoto Oyama	Japan	3:25.81	
11	Leonidas Romero	Colombia	3:27.65	
12	Jan Kamprle	Czech Republic	3:30.10	
13	Jose Miguel Iniesta	Spain	3:32.55	
14	Fernando Gonzalez Illan	Spain	3:34.43	
15	Loic Abouzit	France	3:42.42	

=== Final ===
Rank	Athlete	Nation	Time
1st place, gold medalist(s)	Sven Gallasch	Germany	3:14.19
2nd place, silver medalist(s)	Gergely Juhos	Hungary	3:15.32
3rd place, bronze medalist(s)	Ilya Somov	Russia	3:18.33
4	Lukáš Rada	Czech Republic	3:19.83
5	Hu Hailong	China	3:20.14
6	Wojciech Dorożyński	Poland	3:22.94
7	Sven Kaiser	Germany	3:23.57
8	Daniel Guevara	Colombia	3:26.23
