= Finswimming at the 2001 World Games – Men's 100 m surface =

Finswimming – men's 100 m surface at the 2001 World Games
- Venue: Akita Prefectural Pool, Akita, Japan
- Date: 24 August 2001
- Competitors: 19 from 11 nations

Medalists
gold medal	(Russia) Evgeny Skorzhenko
silver medal	(Russia) Sergey Akhapov
bronze medal	(China) Huang Jiandong

The men's 100 m surface competition in finswimming at the 2001 World Games took place on 24 August 2001 at the Akita Prefectural Pool in Akita, Japan.

== Competition format ==
A total of 19 athletes entered the competition. The best eight athletes from preliminary round qualifies to the final.

== Results ==
=== Preliminary ===
Rank	Athlete	Nation	Time	Note
1	Evgeny Skorzhenko	Russia	37.05	Q
2	Sergey Akhapov	Russia	37.47	Q
3	Andreas Utzmeir	Germany	38.62	Q
4	Huang Jiandong	China	38.81	Q
5	Zhao Ji	China	39.66	Q
6	Aleksander Polak	Poland	39.81	Q
7	Sami Sorri	Finland	40.02	Q
8	Peter Durai	Slovakia	40.15	Q
9	Oscar Cuartas	Colombia	40.18	
10	Tadasu Horiuchi	Japan	40.40	
11	Timo Suominen	Finland	40.44	
12	Kamil Maršálek	Czech Republic	40.48	
13	Frank Wille	Germany	41.00	
14	Jan Skružný	Czech Republic	41.32	
15	Slimann Dekhar	France	41.52	
16	Richard Jean Francois	France	42.36	
17	Javier del Moral	Spain	43.00	
18	Juan José Iturralde	Spain	43.55	
19	Chiaki Komine	Japan	44.36	

=== Final ===
Rank	Athlete	Nation	Time
1st place, gold medalist(s)	Evgeny Skorzhenko	Russia	35.86
2nd place, silver medalist(s)	Sergey Akhapov	Russia	36.99
3rd place, bronze medalist(s)	Huang Jiandong	China	38.36
4	Andreas Utzmeir	Germany	38.38
5	Zhao Ji	China	39.23
6	Aleksander Polak	Poland	39.51
7	Sami Sorri	Finland	39.96
8	Peter Durai	Slovakia	40.11
