= Finswimming at the 2001 World Games – Women's 100 m surface =

International sporting event in Akita, Japan

Finswimming – women's 100 m surface at the 2001 World Games
- Venue: Akita Prefectural Pool, Akita, Japan
- Date: 25 August 2001
- Competitors: 20 from 12 nations

Medalists
gold medal	(China) Liu Qi
silver medal	(Russia) Tatiana Komarova
bronze medal	(China) Zhu Baozhen

The women's 100 m surface competition in finswimming at the 2001 World Games took place on 25 August 2001 at the Akita Prefectural Pool in Akita, Japan.

== Competition format ==
A total of 20 athletes entered the competition. The best eight athletes from preliminary round qualifies to the final.

== Results ==
=== Preliminary ===
Rank	Athlete	Nation	Time	Note
1	Liu Qi	China	43.29	Q
2	Tatiana Komarova	Russia	43.83	Q
3	Suzanne Jentsch	Germany	43.96	Q
4	Irina Egoruchkina	Russia	44.13	Q
5	Zhu Baozhen	China	44.33	Q
6	Helena Kocourková	Czech Republic	44.87	Q
7	Ivonne Bohada	Colombia	46.04	Q
8	Kamila David	Austria	46.29	Q
9	Tina Hirschfeldt	Germany	46.69	
10	Viktoria Pikaly	Hungary	46.99	
11	Olga Loginova	Estonia	47.12	
12	Juliet Tompkins	New Zealand	47.13	
13	Yayoi Sakamoto	Japan	47.15	
14	Petra Hostinska	Czech Republic	47.18	
15	Lee Ji-eun	South Korea	47.30	
16	Beatrix Erdody	Hungary	47.75	
17	Rosalina Buis	Netherlands	48.18	
18	Azusa Kamio	Japan	48.38	
19	Lee Hye-min	South Korea	49.04	
20	Yumiko Sagehashi	Japan	49.75	

=== Final ===
Rank	Athlete	Nation	Time
1st place, gold medalist(s)	Liu Qi	China	43.06
2nd place, silver medalist(s)	Tatiana Komarova	Russia	43.11
3rd place, bronze medalist(s)	Zhu Baozhen	China	43.50
4	Suzanne Jentsch	Germany	43.67
5	Irina Egoruchkina	Russia	44.68
6	Helena Kocourková	Czech Republic	45.10
7	Kamila David	Austria	46.44
8	Ivonne Bohada	Colombia	46.50
