= Lifesaving at the 2001 World Games – Men's 50 m manikin carry =

Lifesaving – men's 50 m manikin carry at the 2001 World Games
- Venue: Akita Prefectural Pool, Akita, Japan
- Date: 25 August 2001
- Competitors: 25 from 9 nations

Medalists
gold medal	(Spain) Pablo Terradillos
silver medal	(Australia) Jason O'Pray
bronze medal	(Australia) Stephen Short

The men's 50 m manikin carry in lifesaving at the 2001 World Games took place on 25 August 2001 at the Akita Prefectural Pool in Akita, Japan.

== Competition format ==
A total of 25 athletes entered the competition. The best nine athletes from preliminary round qualifies to the final.

== Results ==
=== Preliminary ===
Rank	Athlete	Nation	Time	Note
1	Jason O'Pray	Australia	32.38	Q
2	Luke Turner	Australia	33.02	Q
3	Pablo Terradillos	Spain	33.03	Q
4	Stephen Short	Australia	33.29	Q
5	Francisco Jiménez	Spain	33.84	Q
6	Maik Hofmann	Germany	33.86	Q
7	Matthias Löwenberg	Germany	34.32	Q
8	Thorsten Laurent	Germany	34.67	Q
9	Francisco Amat	Spain	35.12	Q
10	Renaat Dreesen	Belgium	35.60	
11	Danilo Mollari	Italy	35.86	
12	Federico De Marco	Italy	35.95	
13	Ryan Butcher	South Africa	36.02	
14	Federico Mastrostefano	Italy	36.07	
15	Graeme Willcox	South Africa	36.57	
16	Hans Vijge	Netherlands	37.12	
17	Nick Polkinghorne	(United Kingdom) Great Britain	37.87	
18	Gary Kurth	South Africa	37.99	
19	Takuya Iritani	Japan	38.07	
20	Hugo Byman	Netherlands	38.16	
21	Bart Laumen	Netherlands	38.64	
22	Ryan Cox	(United Kingdom) Great Britain	39.16	
23	Masahiro Hayashi	Japan	39.61	
24	Ryan Brown	(United Kingdom) Great Britain	40.04	
25	Futoshi Kikuchi	Japan	40.68	

=== Final ===
Rank	Athlete	Nation	Time
1st place, gold medalist(s)	Pablo Terradillos	Spain	32.51
2nd place, silver medalist(s)	Jason O'Pray	Australia	32.72
3rd place, bronze medalist(s)	Stephen Short	Australia	32.76
4	Luke Turner	Australia	33.33
5	Francisco Jiménez	Spain	33.60
6	Matthias Löwenberg	Germany	33.76
7	Maik Hofmann	Germany	34.10
8	Thorsten Laurent	Germany	34.46
	Francisco Amat	Spain	DSQ
