= Finswimming at the 2001 World Games – Women's 4 x 100 m surface =

Event held in Akita, Japan

Finswimming - women's 4 x 100 m surface relay at the World Games
- Venue: Akita Prefectural Pool
- Date: 24 August 2001
- Competitors: 28 from 7 nations

Medalists
1st place, gold medalist(s)		Tatiana Komarova; Lidia Goriacheva; Irina Egoruchkina; Anastassia Kochneva
2nd place, silver medalist(s)		Zhu Baozhen; Li Qingping; Wu Xiaohui; Liu Qi
3rd place, bronze medalist(s)		Suzanne Jentzsch; Tina Hirschfeldt; Bettina Müller; Christine Müller

The women's 4 x 100 m surface relay event in finswimming at the 2001 World Games took place on 24 August 2001 at the Akita Prefectural Pool in Akita, Japan.

== Competition format ==
A total of 7 teams entered the competition. Only final was held.

== Results ==
Rank	Country	Team	Time
1st place, gold medalist(s)	Russia	Tatiana Komarova; Lidia Goriacheva; Irina Egoruchkina; Anastassia Kochneva	2:54.65
2nd place, silver medalist(s)	China	Zhu Baozhen; Li Qingping; Wu Xiaohui; Liu Qi	2:54.89
3rd place, bronze medalist(s)	Germany	Suzanne Jentzsch; Tina Hirschfeldt; Bettina Müller; Christine Müller	3:00.43
4	Hungary	Beatrix Erdody; Marina Nagy; Viktoria Pikaly; Hajnalka Debreczeni	3:09.28
5	Japan	Ran Ogata; Yumiko Sagehashi; Azusa Kamio; Yayoi Sakamoto	3:09.55
6	South Korea	Lee Ji-eun; Cho Ju-hee; Lee Hye-min; Chun Sung-sun	3:11.82
	Czech Republic	Helena Kocourková; Petra Hostinska; Hana Vykoukalová; Michaela Simaicová	DSQ
