= Finswimming at the 2001 World Games – Men's 200 m surface =

Finswimming – men's 200 m surface at the 2001 World Games
- Venue: Akita Prefectural Pool, Akita, Japan
- Date: 25 August 2001
- Competitors: 19 from 11 nations

Medalists
gold medal	(Russia) Sergey Akhapov
silver medal	(Germany) Andreas Utzmeir
bronze medal	(Russia) Ilya Somov

The men's 200 m surface competition in finswimming at the 2001 World Games took place on 25 August 2001 at the Akita Prefectural Pool in Akita, Japan.

== Competition format ==
A total of 19 athletes entered the competition. The best eight athletes from preliminary round qualifies to the final.

== Results ==
=== Preliminary ===
Rank	Athlete	Nation	Time	Note
1	Ilya Somov	Russia	1:28.69	Q
2	Sergey Akhapov	Russia	1:30.42	Q
3	Sven Gallasch	Germany	1:30.47	Q
4	Di Qing	China	1:30.49	Q
5	Andreas Utzmeir	Germany	1:30.65	Q
6	Lukáš Rada	Czech Republic	1:31.03	Q
7	Erven Morice	France	1:31.18	Q
8	Peter Durai	Slovakia	1:31.50	Q
9	Tadasu Horiuchi	Japan	1:31.74	
10	Wojciech Dorożyński	Poland	1:32.31	
11	Gergely Juhos	Hungary	1:32.84	
12	Leonidas Romero	Colombia	1:33.71	
13	Daniel Guevara	Colombia	1:35.18	
14	Hu Hailong	China	1:36.04	
15	Jan Kamprle	Czech Republic	1:36.80	
16	Jose Miguel Iniesta	Spain	1:37.03	
17	Fernando Gonzalez Illan	Spain	1:38.59	
18	Loic Abouzit	France	1:39.24	
19	Chiaki Komine	Japan	1:39.40	

=== Final ===
Rank	Athlete	Nation	Time
1st place, gold medalist(s)	Sergey Akhapov	Russia	1:27.05
2nd place, silver medalist(s)	Andreas Utzmeir	Germany	1:27.27
3rd place, bronze medalist(s)	Ilya Somov	Russia	1:27.87
4	Di Qing	China	1:30.40
5	Sven Gallasch	Germany	1:30.92
6	Lukáš Rada	Czech Republic	1:31.34
7	Peter Durai	Slovakia	1:32.03
8	Erven Morice	France	1:33.04
