= Lifesaving at the 2001 World Games – Men's 100 m rescue medley =

Lifesaving – men's 100 m rescue medley at the 2001 World Games
- Venue: Akita Prefectural Pool, Akita, Japan
- Date: 24 August 2001
- Competitors: 25 from 9 nations

Medalists
gold medal	(Germany) Lutz Heimann
silver medal	(Australia) Jason O'Pray
bronze medal	(Australia) Stephen Short

The men's 100 m rescue medley in lifesaving at the 2001 World Games took place on 24 August 2001 at the Akita Prefectural Pool in Akita, Japan.

== Competition format ==
A total of 25 athletes entered the competition. The best nine athletes from preliminary round qualifies to the final.

== Results ==
=== Preliminary ===
Rank	Athlete	Nation	Time	Note
1	Jason O'Pray	Australia	1:06.19	Q
2	Maik Hofmann	Germany	1:06.45	Q
3	Lutz Heimann	Germany	1:06.99	Q
4	Stephen Short	Australia	1:07.84	Q
5	Pablo Terradillos	Spain	1:08.76	Q
6	Frederico Amat	Spain	1:09.11	Q
7	Luke Turner	Australia	1:09.22	Q
8	Danilo Mollari	Italy	1:09.40	Q
9	Federico Mastrostefano	Italy	1:10.00	Q
10	Federico De Marco	Italy	1:10.17	
11	Stuart Snell	(United Kingdom) Great Britain	1:10.88	
12	Francisco Jiménez	Spain	1:10.95	
13	Thorsten Laurent	Germany	1:11.86	
14	Hans Vyge	Netherlands	1:12.13	
15	Graeme Willcox	South Africa	1:13.67	
16	Nick Polkinghorne	(United Kingdom) Great Britain	1:13.99	
17	Hugo Byman	Netherlands	1:14.58	
18	Vincent Honet	Belgium	1:14.91	
19	Gary Kurth	South Africa	1:15.27	
20	Bart Laumen	Netherlands	1:17.78	
21	Ryan Brown	(United Kingdom) Great Britain	1:17.90	
22	Kengo Amagai	Japan	1:19.91	
23	Hidenobu Tadano	Japan	1:20.85	
24	Takuya Iritani	Japan	1:21.51	
25	Matthew Bouman	South Africa	1:25.49	

=== Final ===
Rank	Athlete	Nation	Time
1st place, gold medalist(s)	Lutz Heimann	Germany	1:06.11
2nd place, silver medalist(s)	Jason O'Pray	Australia	1:06.40
3rd place, bronze medalist(s)	Stephen Short	Australia	1:07.15
4	Maik Hofmann	Germany	1:07.49
5	Luke Turner	Australia	1:08.58
6	Pablo Terradillos	Spain	1:08.87
7	Danilo Mollari	Italy	1:09.44
8	Frederico Amat	Spain	1:10.00
8	Federico Mastrostefano	Italy	1:10.00
