= Karla Gilbert =

Australian surf lifesaver

Medal record

Women's lifesaving

Representing Australia

The World Games
Gold medal – first place	2001 Akita	Board race
Gold medal – first place	2001 Akita	Surf race

Karla Nicole Gilbert OAM (born 28 February 1975) is a former Australian professional surf lifesaver.

Throughout the 1990s and early 2000s, Gilbert competed in Ironwoman (surf lifesaving) races, winning the Australian Championship three times (1993, 1994 and 2003) and also won the Devondale Ironwoman Series, Meadowlea Ironwoman series and Kelloggs Ironwoman Series seven years in concession from 1995 to 2003. She was awarded a Medal of the Order of Australia in 2009 for services to surf lifesaving and the community, and is a member of the International, Australian, Queensland, Gold Coast Sporting Halls of Fame.

Gilbert competed in the Gladiator Individual Sports Athletes Challenge in 1995.

Later in her career, Gilbert pursued adventure racing, where she won the Australian Short Course Adventure Race title in 2006.

This led onto taking up the sport of Standup Paddle Boarding in 2008, soon after her first child was born and went on to win the Australian Championships in 2012, 2013, 2014 and 2015.

Gilbert went into nutrition and health coaching. She launched her website in late September 2013.

Gilbert was inducted into the Sport Australia Hall of Fame in 2005. and went on to become a life member of the Surfers Paradise Surf Lifesaving Club later that year.
