= Leigh Habler =

Australian swimmer

Personal information
- Born: Leigh Christine Habler; April 29, 1976 (age 50) Sydney, New South Wales, Australia
Medal record
Women's swimming
Representing Australia

Leigh Christine Habler (born 29 April 1976), is an Australian former swimming representative.

== Swimming career ==
At age 11, swimming for the Academy club in Sydney, Habler set two New South Wales records for her age in the 1987 Metropolitan Swimming Championships. She was described as "one of the greatest Olympic prospects for her age for very many years" by coach Forbes Carlile.

Habler represented Australia at the 1992 Barcelona Olympics and placed eighth in the final of the women's 200 m backstroke. She then finished second in the 1992 Australian Short Course Swimming Championships.

In 1995 Habler competed in the 200 m backstroke event at the World Short Course Championships and finished third.
