= Akita Prefectural General Pool =

Swimming venue in Akita, Japan

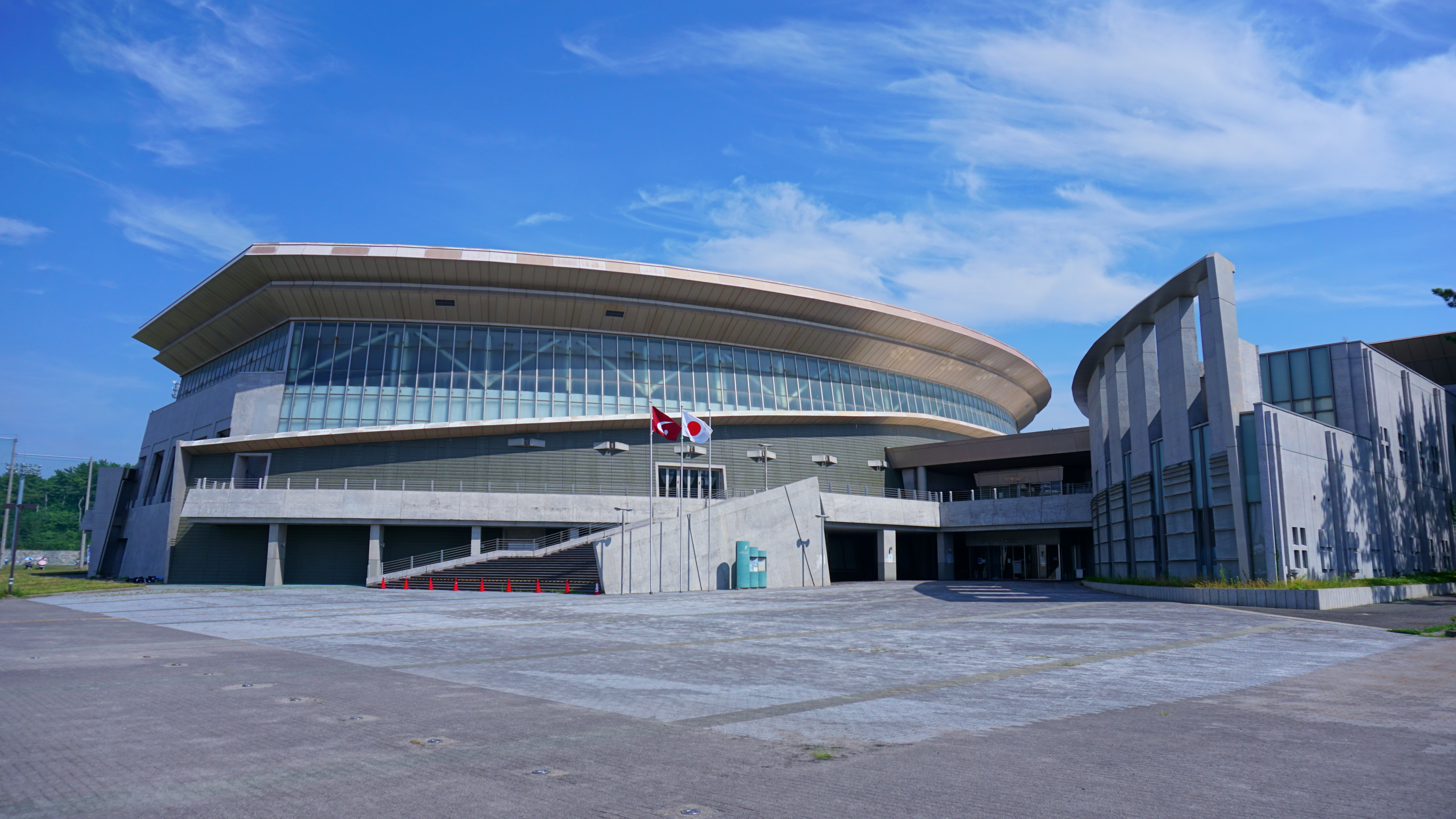
- Interactive map of Akita Prefectural General Pool
- Full name: Akita Prefectural General Pool
- Location: Sanuki 4-50, Araya Machi, Akita, Japan
- Capacity: Main:2,000; Sub:148

Construction
- Opened: March 26, 2001

Website
- http://www.akisouko.com/pool/index.html

Akita Prefectural General Pool

General information
- Architectural style: Steel truss design, SRC, Reinforced concrete

Technical details
- Floor count: 3
- Floor area: 14,160 m^{3} (500,000 cu ft)

Design and construction
- Architect: Azusa Sekkei
- Main contractor: Maeda Corporation; Fujita

Akita Prefectural General Pool (秋田県立総合プール, Akita Kenritsu Sōgō Pūru) is a swimming venue in Akita, Akita, Japan. An Olympic competitor, Hiroko Nagasaki is the honorary director. It hosted the 2001 World Games, and it is the largest swimming pool in the prefecture.

== Events ==
- 2001 World Games - Lifesaving and Finswimming
- National Sports Festival of Japan (2007)

== Aquatic timing system ==
- Seiko timing system

== Closing days ==
- The third Monday
- December 29-January 1, January 20-February 3

== Gallery ==
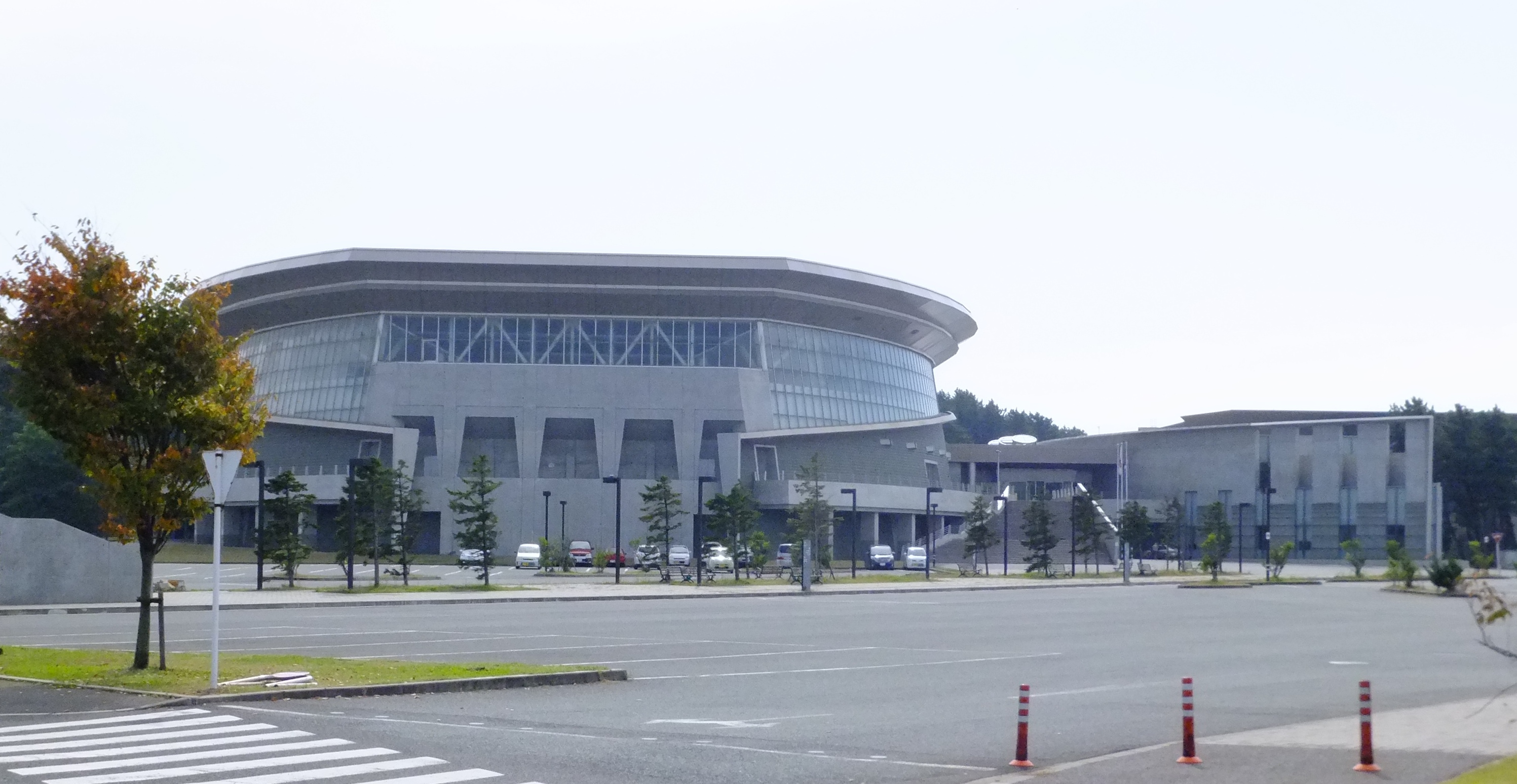
Front view

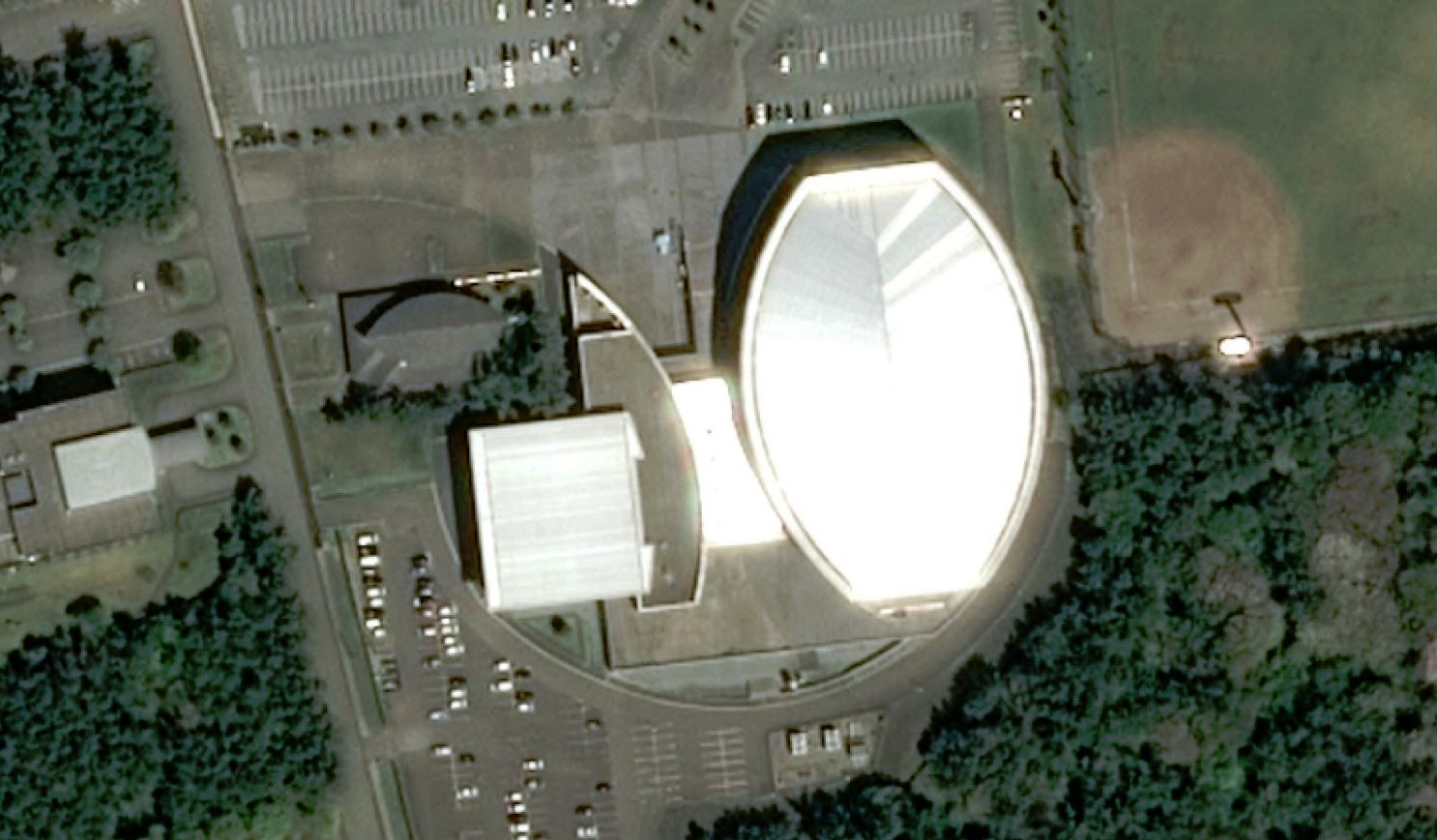
Satellite view

== Other swimming pools in Akita City ==
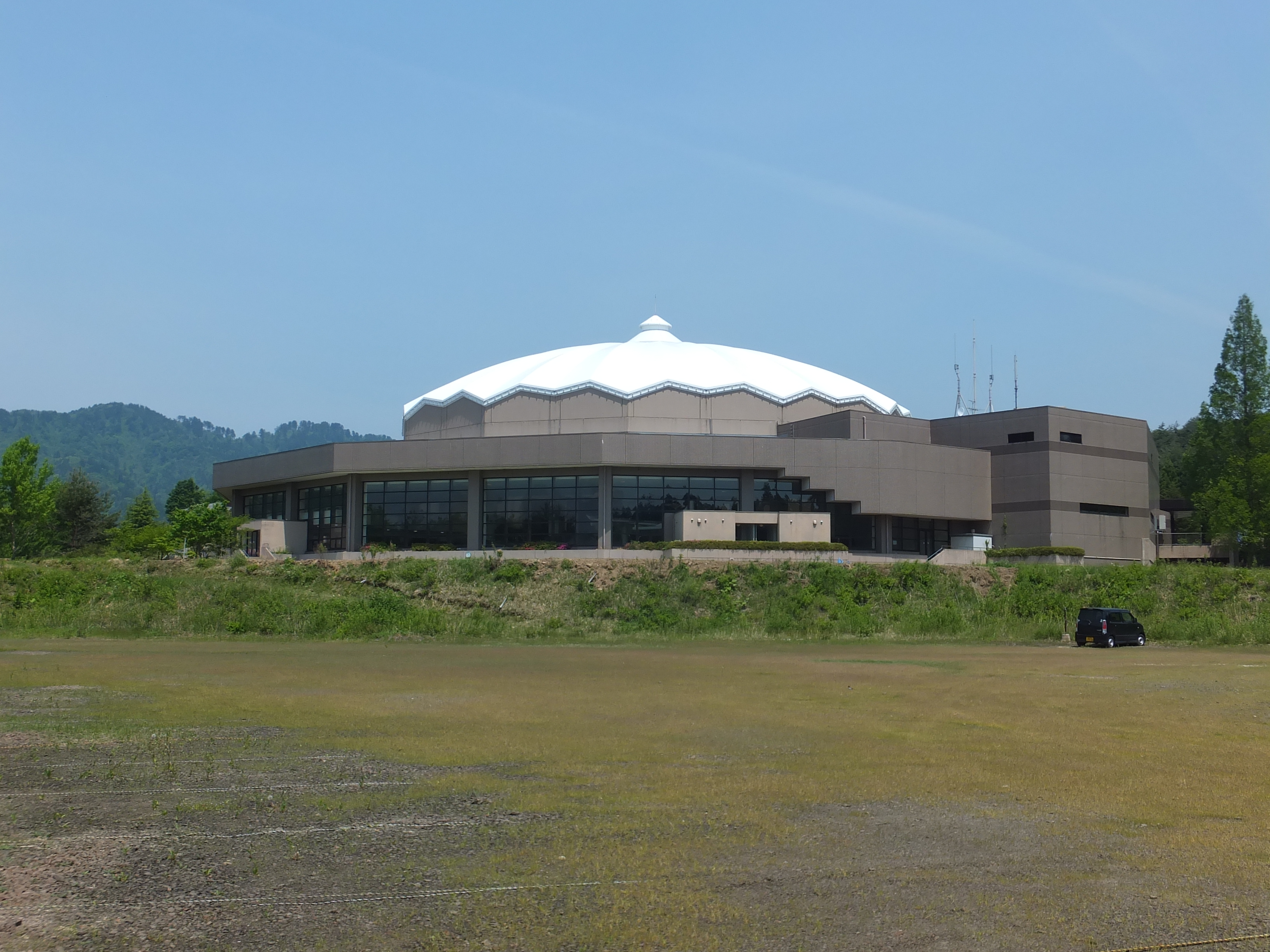
Quardome The Boon

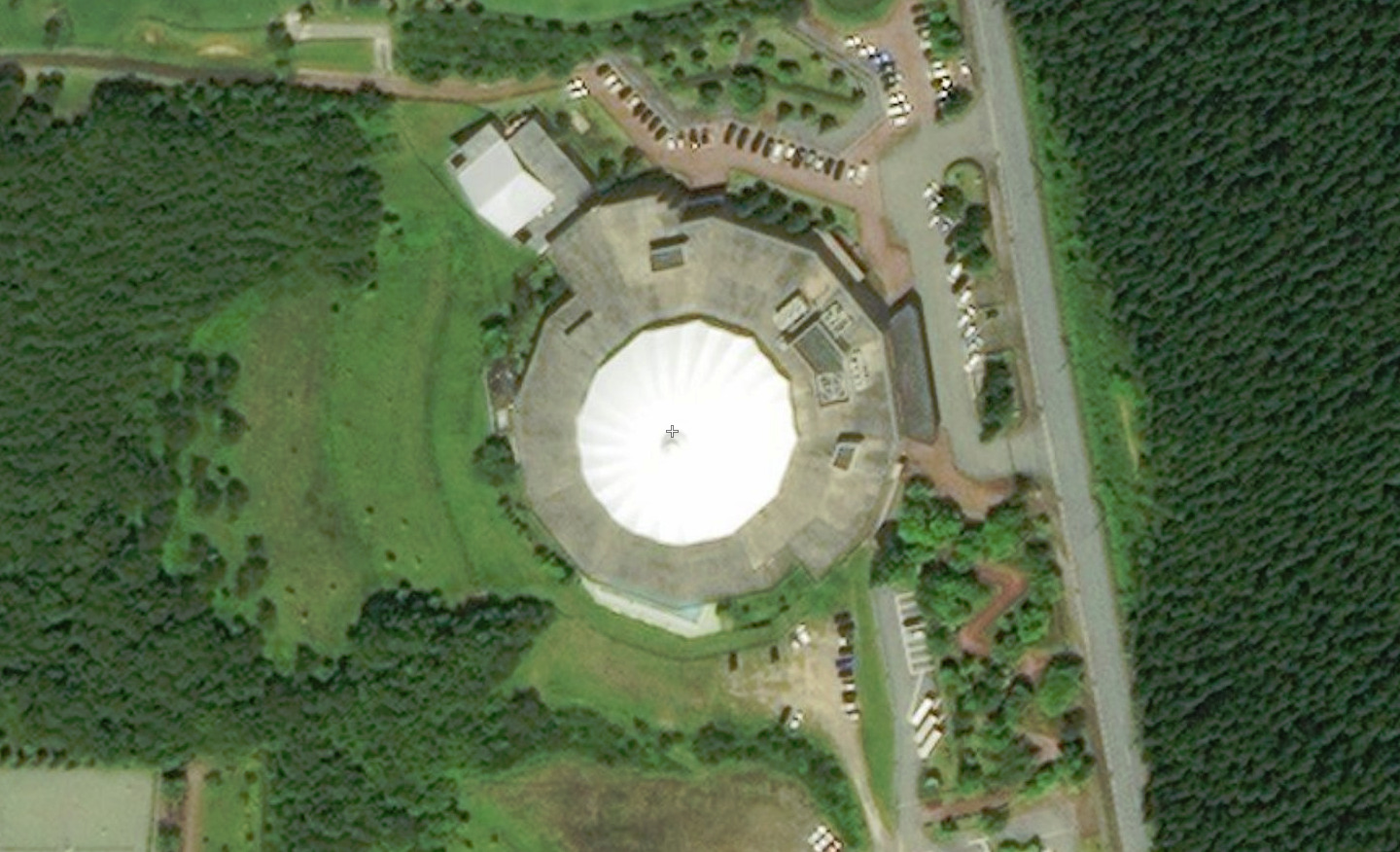
Satellite view of Quardome The Boon (39°47′41.3″N 140°13′22.5″E)

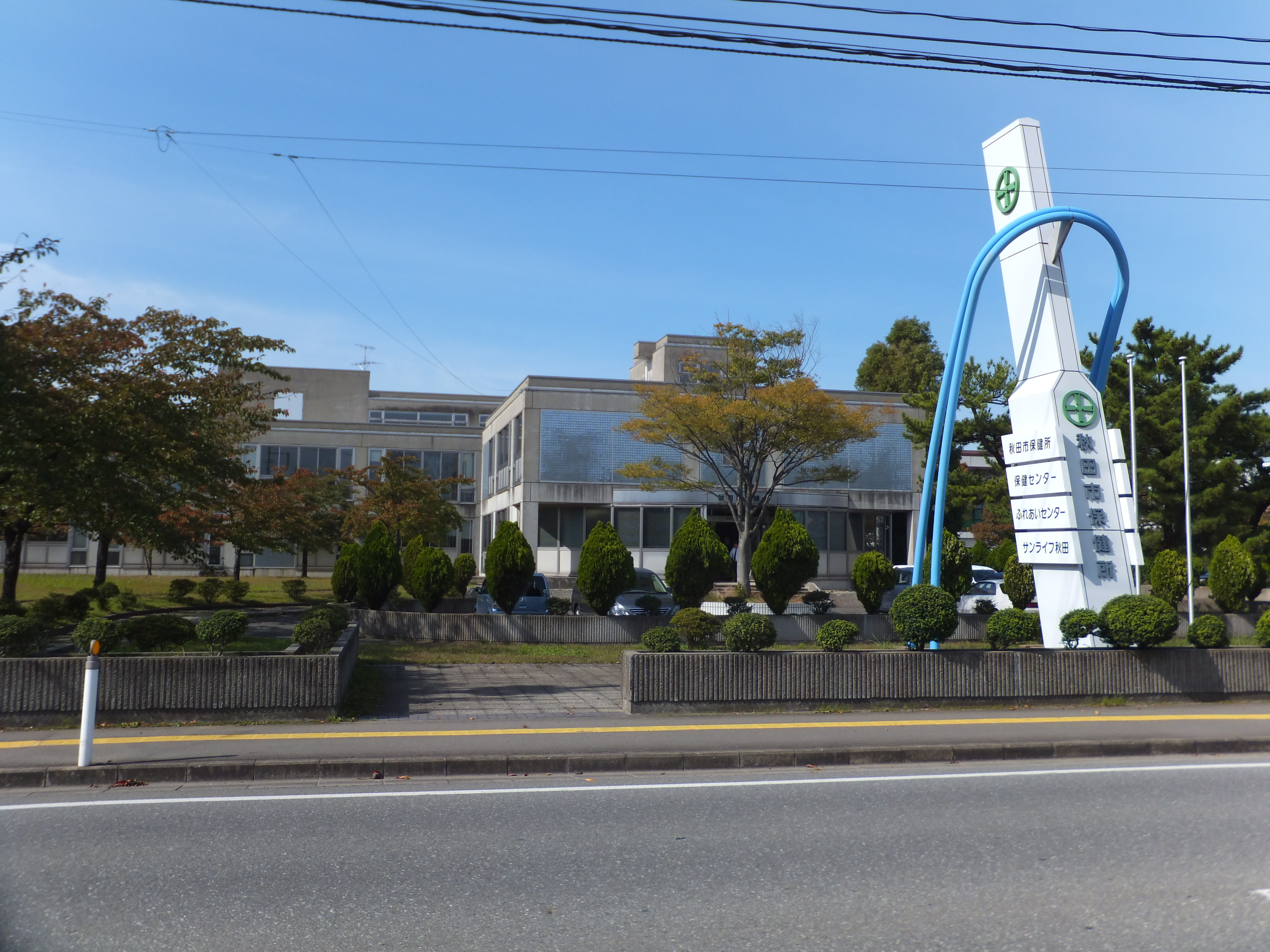
Sunlife Akita (39°43′13.4″N 140°5′31.5″E)

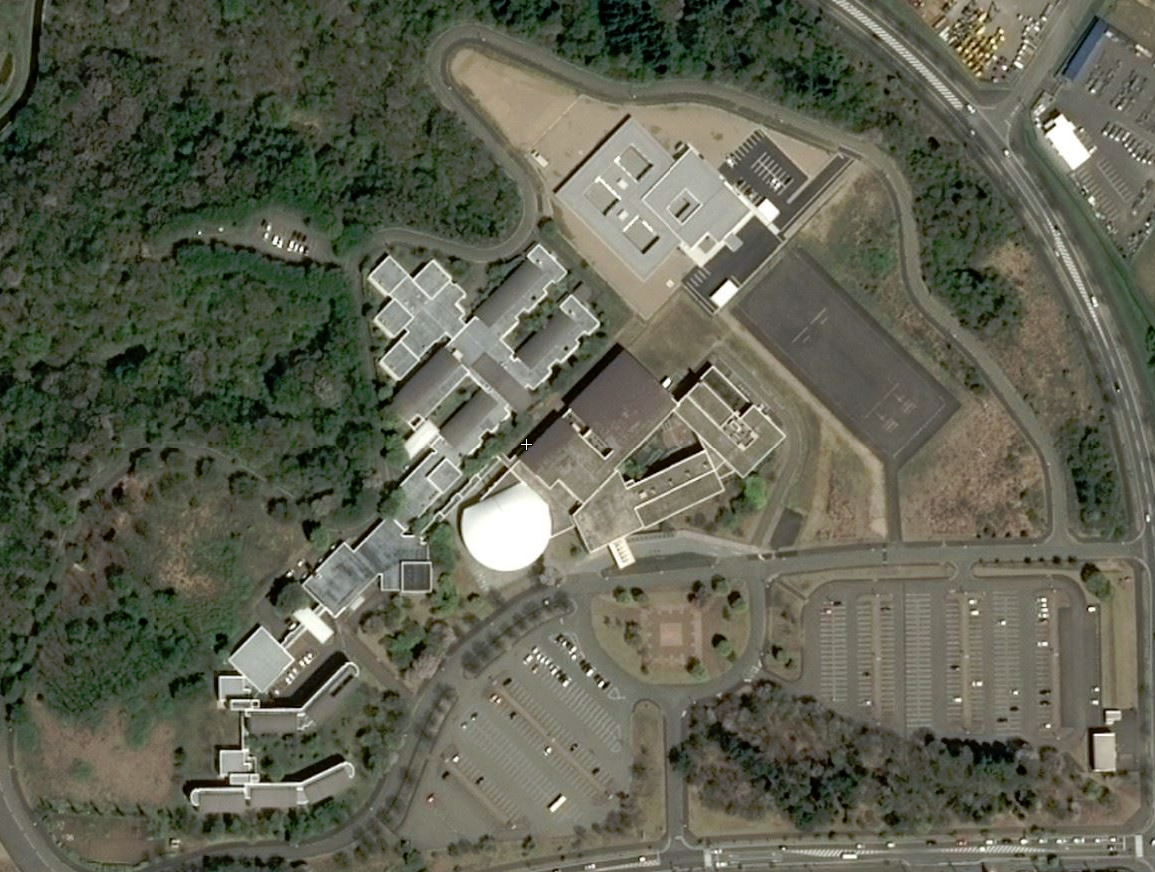
Central Silver Area Swimming Pool (39°39′58.2″N 140°09′19.0″E)

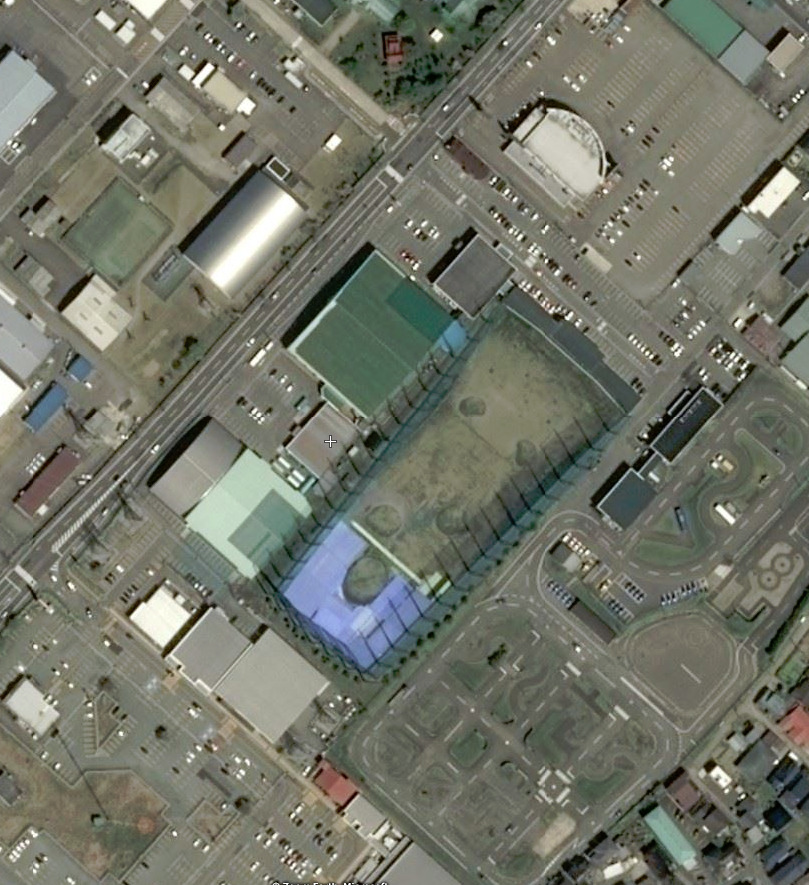
Akita Athletic Club (39°41′54.7″N 140°6′0.6″E)

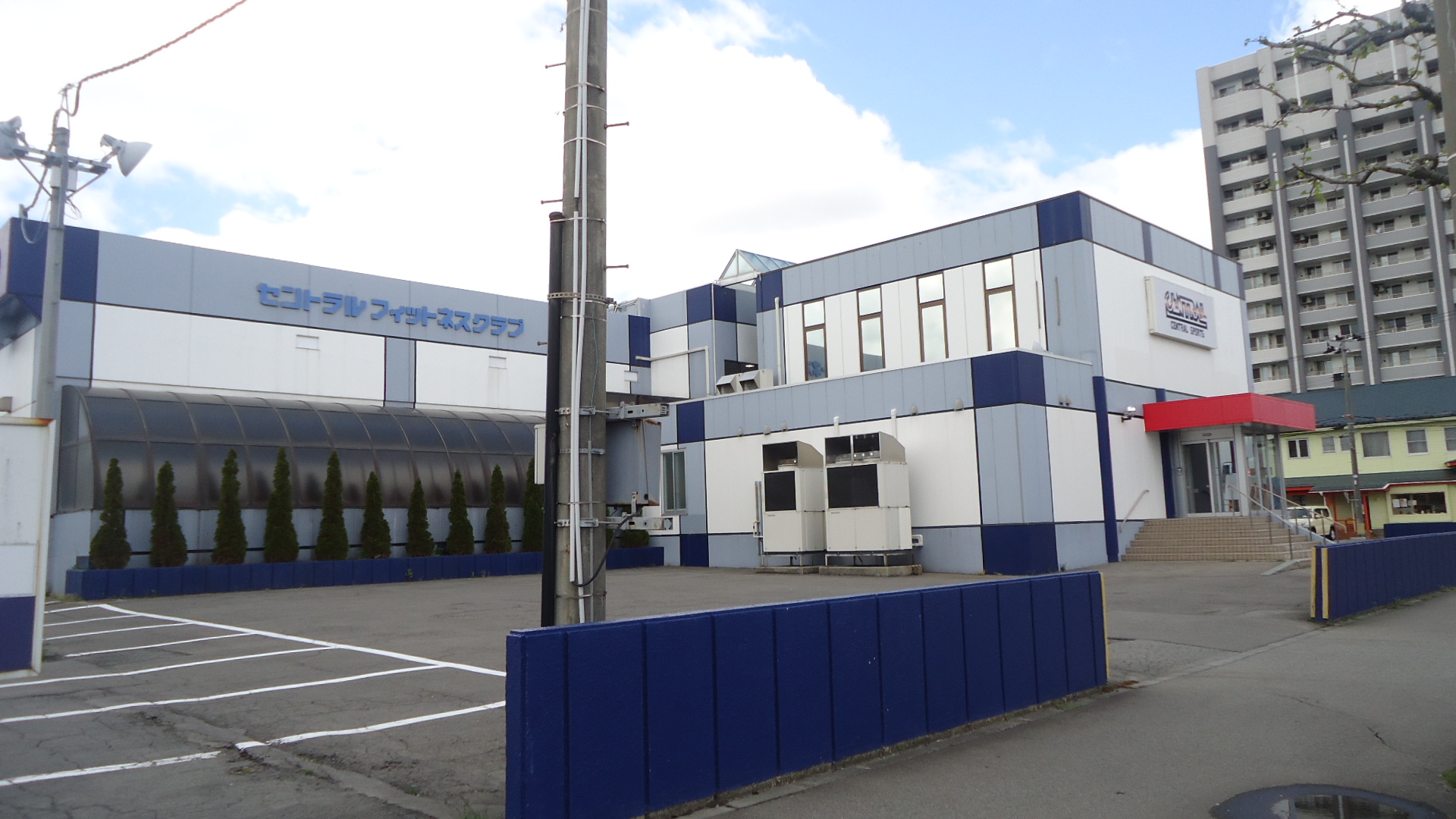
Central Sports Hiroomote (39°43′37.5″N 140°08′57.9″E)

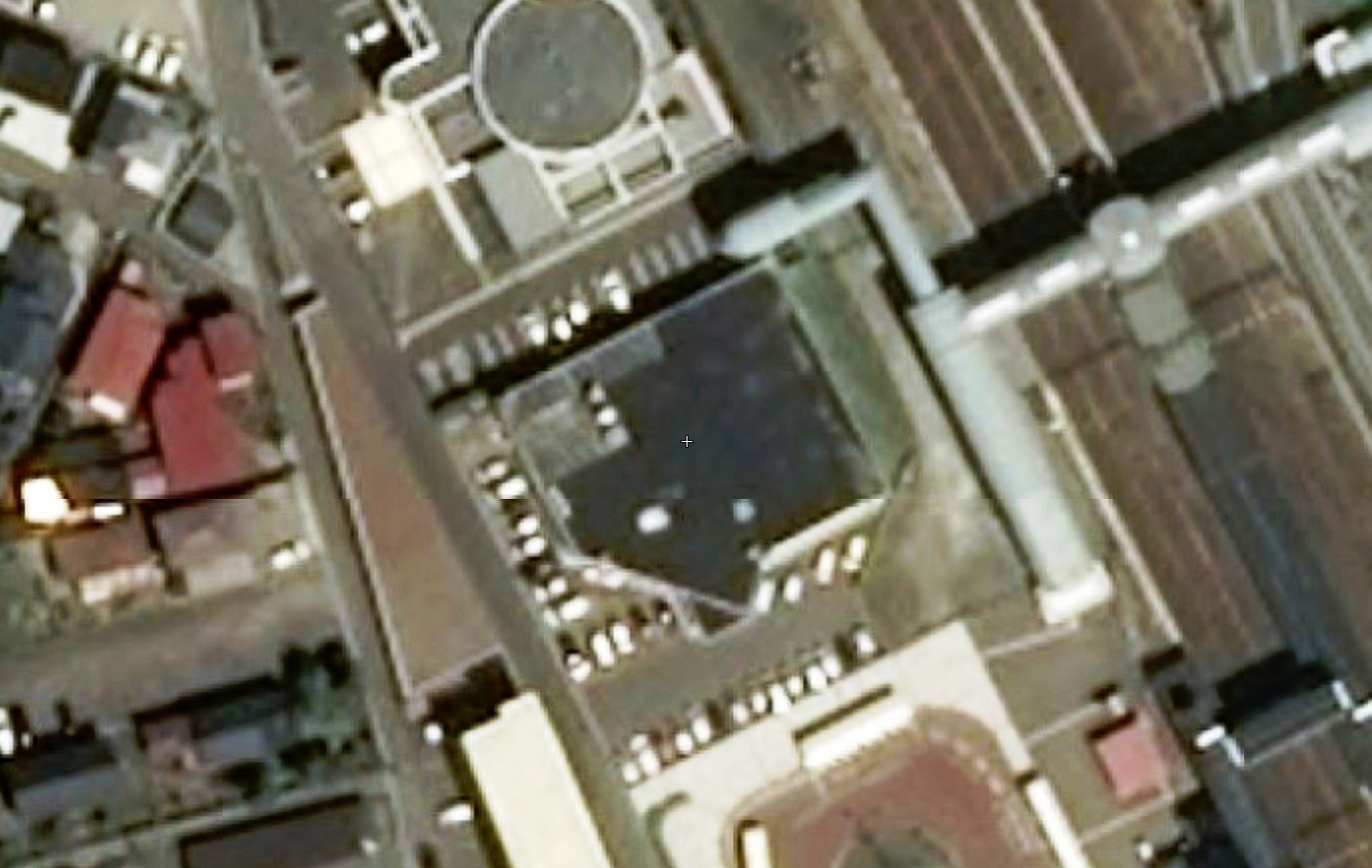
Central Sports Tsuchizaki (39°45′32.3″N 140°04′22.6″E)

== Other swimming pools in Akita prefecture ==
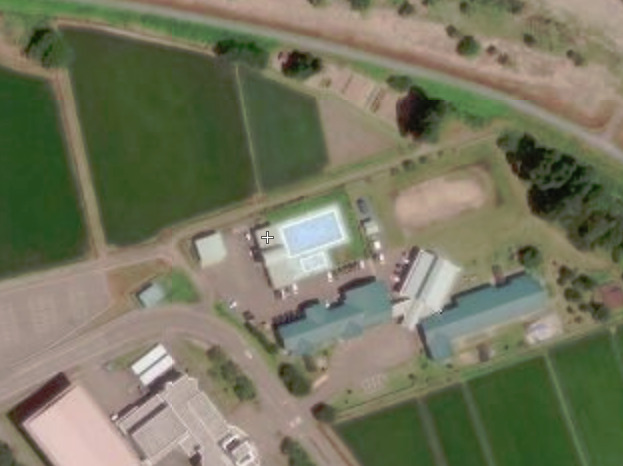
Aikawa Pool (40°09′33.9″N 140°18′55.3″E)

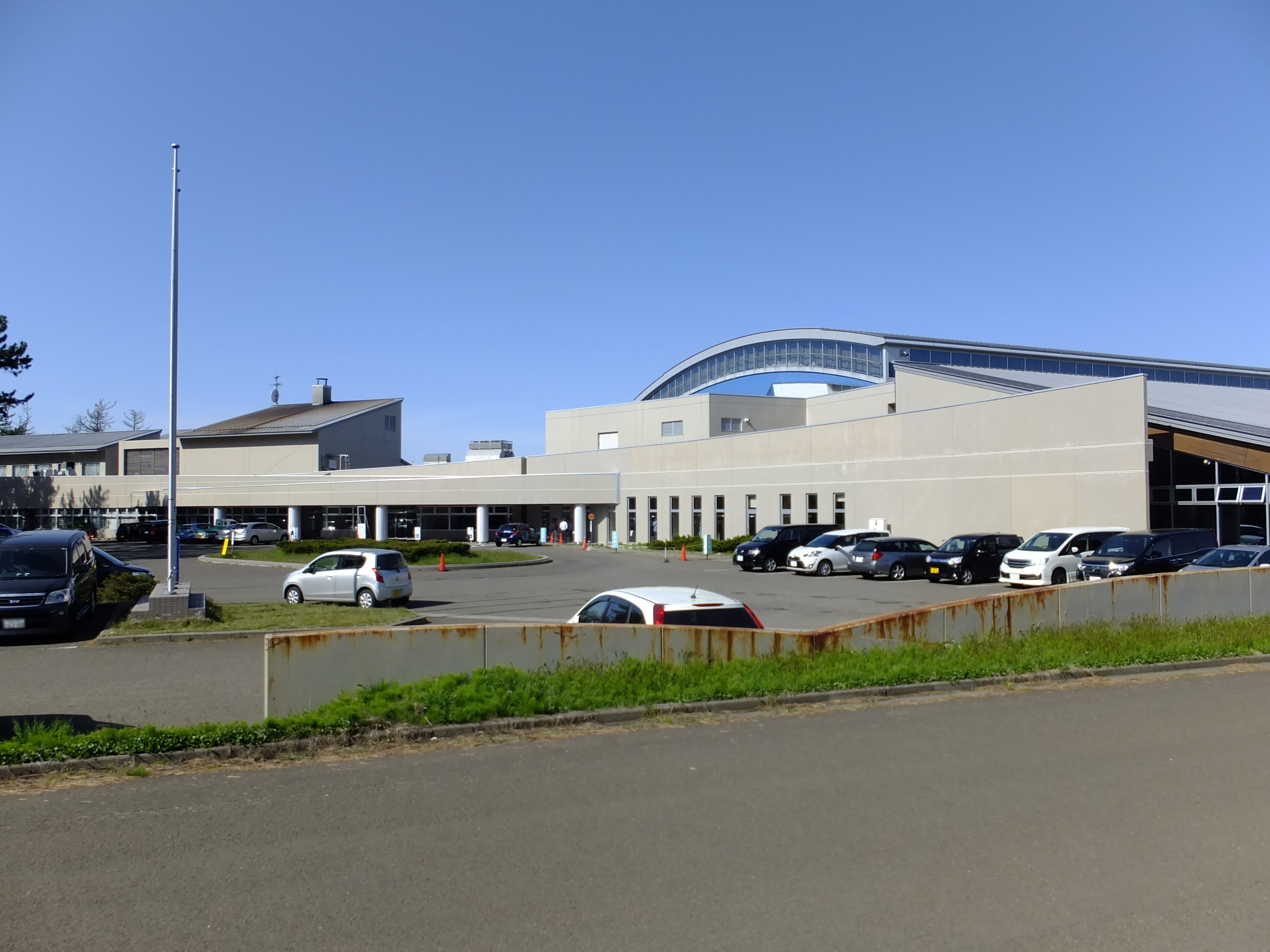
Arinasu (40°14′1.7″N 140°0′57.4″E)

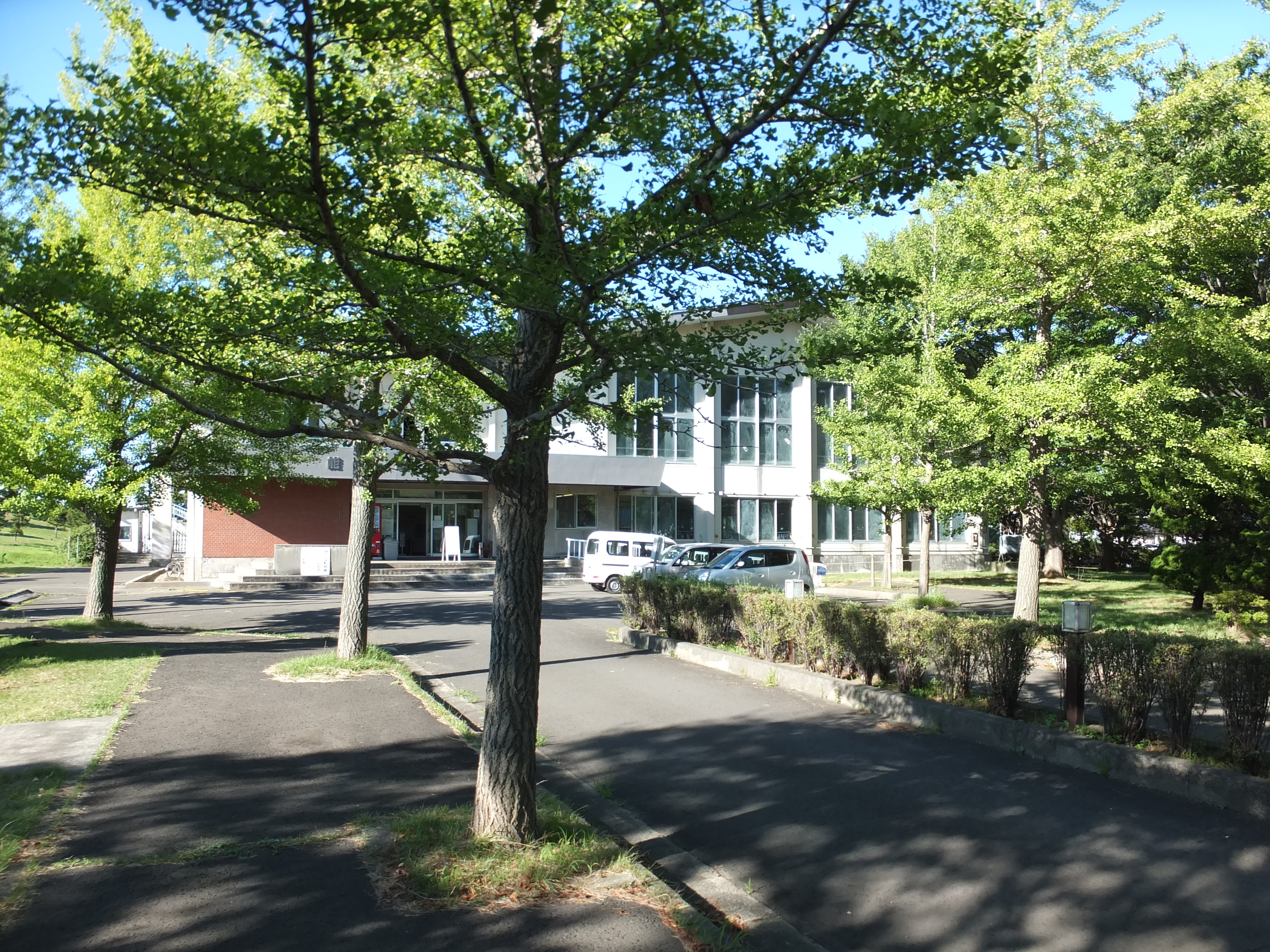
Noshiro City Swimming Pool (40°12′56.6″N 140°01′41.6″E)

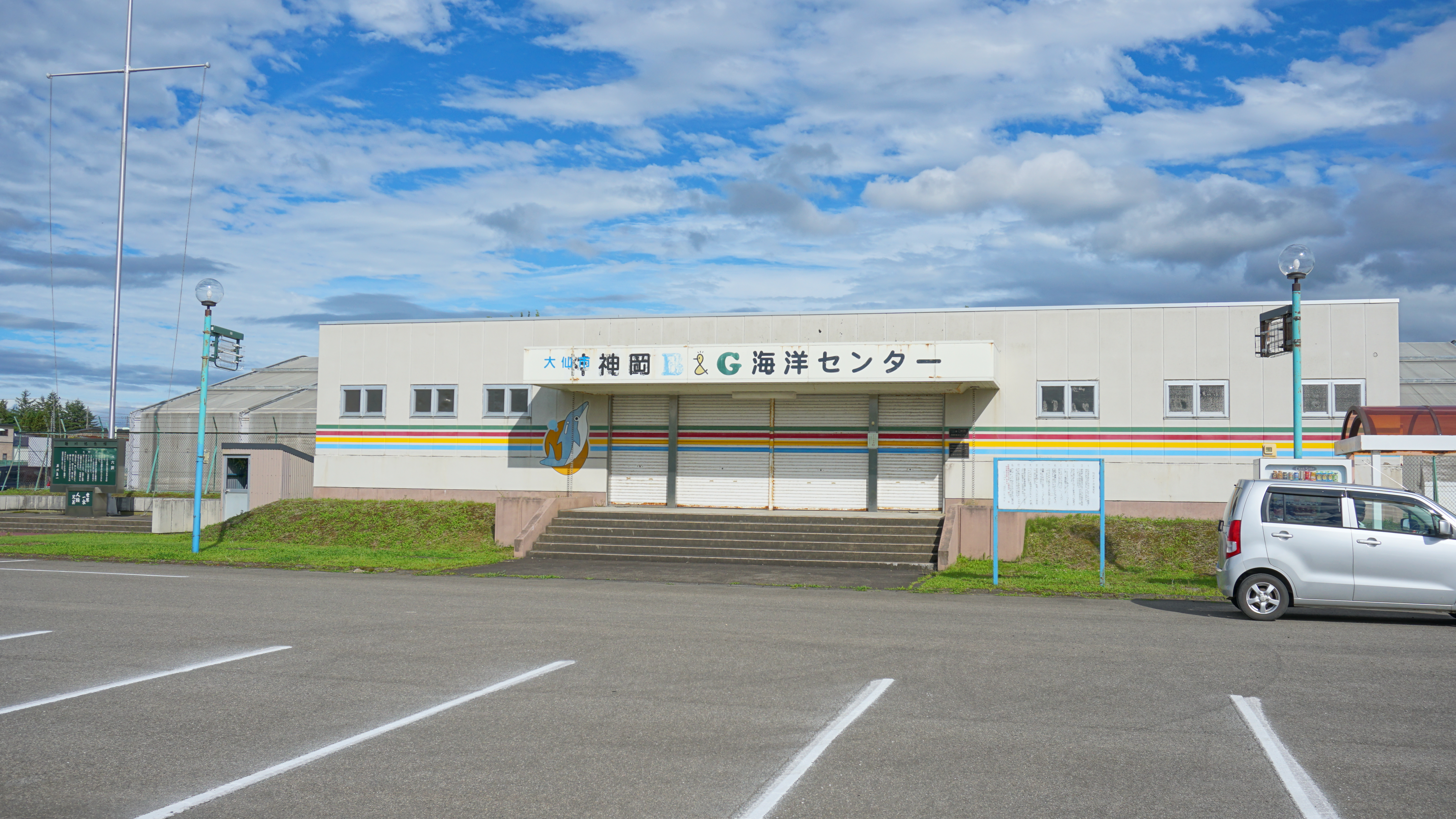
Daisen City Kamioka B&G Ocean Center (39°29′47.2″N 140°24′55.4″E)

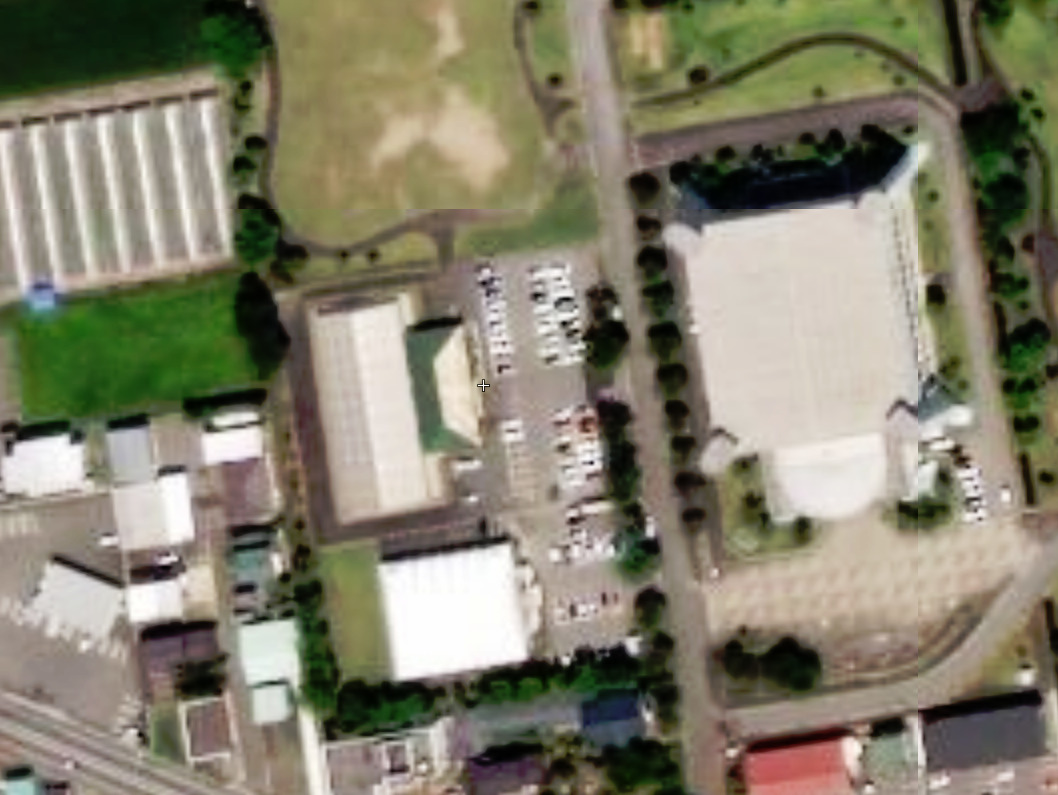
Yuzawa City B&G Ocean Center (39°10′28.3″N 140°28′41.0″E)

== Defunct swimming pools in Akita prefecture ==
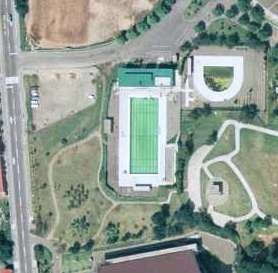
Akita City Swimming Pool in 1975 (1956–2002)

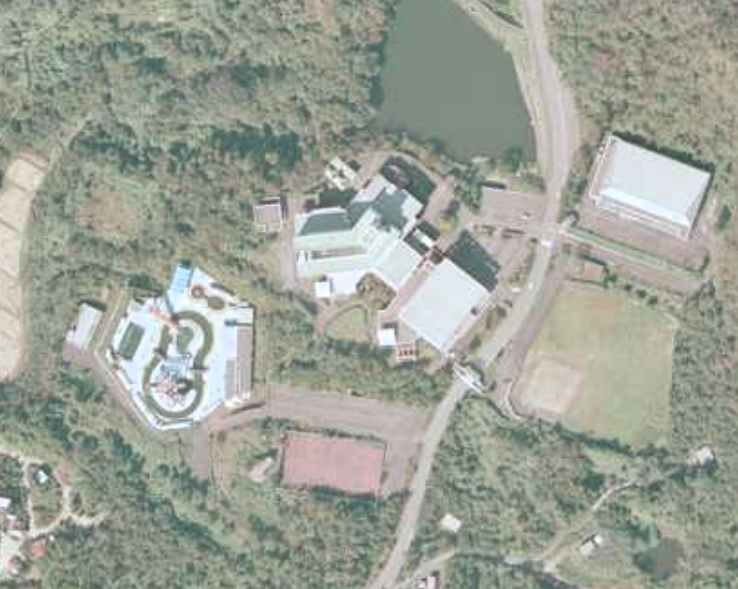
Kosei Nenkin Swimming Pool (39°33′16.2″N 140°03′42.2″E)

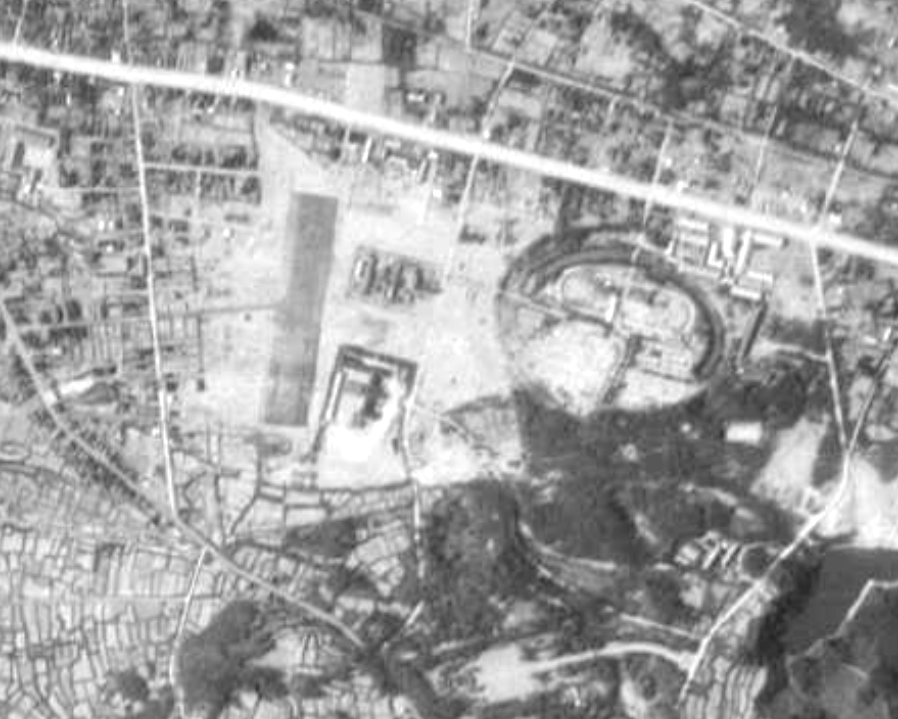
Shogunno Yuenchi Swimming Pool (1927–1945)
