= Acrobatic gymnastics at the 2017 World Games =

- The pictogram of Acrobatic gymnastics.
- Venue: Centennial Hall
- Dates: 24–26 July 2017
- Competitors: 78 from 13 nations

The acrobatic gymnastics tournaments at the 2017 World Games in Wrocław was played between 24 and 26 July. 78 acrobatic gymnastics competitors, from 13 nations, participated in the tournament. The acrobatic gymnastics competition took place at Centennial Hall in Lower Silesian Voivodeship.

== Qualification ==
Qualification was based on the results of the 2016 Acrobatic Gymnastics World Championships, held in Putian, China, from 1 to 3 April 2016.

At the end of the qualification round, the top five countries in each category will have earned places to compete in Wroclaw, with a maximum of one place per country. An additional berth in each discipline may be attributed by the FIG Executive Committee following the competition to assure host country participation or continental representation.

== Schedule ==
Q	Qualification	F	Final

Centennial Hall
Event↓/Date →	Mon 24		Tue 25		Wed 26	
Men's pairs all-around			Q	F		
Women's pairs all-around	Q	F				
Mixed pairs all-around	Q	F				
Men's group all-around					Q	F
Women's group all-around			Q	F		

== Participating nations ==
Poland, as the host country, receives a guaranteed spot, in case it were not to earn one by the regular qualifying methods.

- Australia (4)
- Belgium (4)
- Belarus (5)
- China (11)
- Germany (5)
- Great Britain (11)
- Israel (6)
- Netherlands (2)
- Poland (2)
- Portugal (2)
- Russia (13)
- Ukraine (6)
- United States (7)

== Medal table ==
Rank	Nation	Gold	Silver	Bronze	Total
1	Russia	3	1	0	4
2	Great Britain	1	0	2	3
3	Germany	1	0	0	1
4	Belarus	0	2	0	2
5	Belgium	0	1	1	2
6	China	0	1	0	1
7	Israel	0	0	1	1
7	Ukraine	0	0	1	1
Totals (8 entries)		5	5	5	15

== Events ==
=== Men's events ===
Event	Gold	Silver	Bronze
Group all-around	Great Britain; Conor Sawenko; Charlie Tate; Adam Upcott; Lewis Watts	China; Li Zheng; Rui Liuming; Zhang Teng; Zhou Jiahuai	Israel; Lidar Dana; Yannay Kalfa; Efi Efraim Sach; Daniel Uralevitch
Pairs all-around	Germany; Tim Sebastian; Michael Kraft	Russia; Igor Mishev; Nikolay Suprunov	Belgium; Kilian Goffaux; Robin Casse

=== Women's events ===
Event	Gold	Silver	Bronze
Group all-around	Russia; Daria Chebulanka; Polina Plastinina; Kseniya Zagoskina	Belarus; Julia Ivonchyk; Veranika Nabokina; Karina Sandovich	Great Britain; Isabel Haigh; Emily Hancock; Ilisha Boardman
Pairs all-around	Russia; Daria Guryeva; Daria Kalinina	Belgium; Lore Vanden Berghe; Noémie Lammertyn	Ukraine; Veronika Habelok; Irina Nazimova

=== Mixed events ===
Event	Gold	Silver	Bronze
Pairs all-around	Russia; Marina Chernova; Georgii Pataraia	Belarus; Volha Melnik; Artur Beliakou	Great Britain; Kathryn Williams; Lewis Walker

== See also ==
- Gymnastics at the 2016 Summer Olympics
