= Aerobic gymnastics at the 2017 World Games =

2017 world games event in wroclaw, Poland

- The pictogram of Aerobic gymnastics.
- Venue: Centennial Hall
- Dates: 21–22 July 2017
- Competitors: 116 from 13 nations

The aerobic gymnastics tournaments at the 2017 World Games in Wrocław was played between 21 and 22 July. One hundred sixteen aerobic gymnastics competitors, from 13 nations, participated in the tournament. The aerobic gymnastics competition took place at Centennial Hall in Lower Silesian Voivodeship.

== Qualification ==
Qualification was based on the results of the 2016 Aerobic Gymnastics World Championships, held in Incheon, South Korea, from 17 to 19 June 2016.

At the end of the qualification round, the top five countries in each category will have earned places to compete in Wroclaw, with a maximum of one place per country. An additional berth in each discipline may be attributed by the FIG Executive Committee following the competition to assure host country participation or continental representation.

== Schedule ==
Q	Qualification	F	Final

Centennial Hall
Event↓/Date →	Fri 21		Sat 22	
Mixed pairs	Q	F		
Open event dance	Q	F		
Open event group			Q	F
Open event step			Q	F
Open event trio			Q	F

== Participating nations ==
The 116 aerobic gymnastics competitors, from 13 nations, participated in the tournament. The host country, Poland did not participate in this sport.

- Brazil (8)
- China (14)
- France (5)
- Hungary (17)
- Italy (5)
- Japan (3)
- Mongolia (8)
- Romania (12)
- Russia (19)
- South Africa (3)
- South Korea (12)
- Spain (2)
- Ukraine (8)

== Medal table ==
Rank	Nation	Gold	Silver	Bronze	Total
1	China	1	2	0	3
2	Russia	1	1	0	2
3	Japan	1	0	0	1
3	South Korea	1	0	0	1
3	Spain	1	0	0	1
6	Hungary	0	1	3	4
7	Romania	0	1	1	2
8	France	0	0	1	1
Totals (8 entries)		5	5	5	15

== Events ==
Event	Gold	Silver	Bronze
Mixed pairs	Spain; Vicente Lli; Sara Moreno	Hungary; Dora Hegyi; Daniel Bali	Romania; Andreea Bogati; Dacian Barna
Open event dance	South Korea; Han Jae Hyun; Kim Hanjin; Kim Yu Hwan; Kwon Tae Yun; Lee Jon Gu; Park Hyunmin; Ryu Jusun; Song Sungkyu	Russia; Danil Chaiun; Garsevan Dzhanazian; Kirill Kulikov; Kirill Lobaznyuk; Roman Semenov; Anton Shishigin; Denis Shurupov; Aleksei Zhuravlev	Hungary; Dora Hegyi; Zoltan Lőcsei; Panna Szőllősi; Emese Timea Szaloki; Balazs Albert Farkas; Anna Deak; Fanni Mazacs; Klaudia Bokonyi
Open event group	China; Li Lingxiao; Li Qi; Ma Dong; Pan Lixi; Wang Ke	Romania; Gabriel Bocser; Andreea Bogati; Lucian Săvulescu; Dacian Barna; Marian Brotei	Hungary; Dora Hegyi; Daniel Bali; Panna Szőllősi Balazs; Albert Farkas; Fanni Mazacs
Open event step	Russia; Anastasia Degtiareva; Irina Dobriagina; Veronika Korneva; Ekaterina Pykhtova; Anastasia Ziubina; Danil Chaiun; Aleksei Germanov	China; Fu Yao; Huang Chengkai; Huang Zijing; Jiang Shuai; Liu Yiluan; Yang Qiaobo; Zhang Huiwen; Zhao Ming	Hungary; Erdősi Dániel; Kőrösi Kitti; Etényi Zsófia; Szabó Júlia; Szenes Boglárka; Szilvás Angéla; Táskai Anita; Varga Dorottya
Open event trio	Japan; Riri Kitazume; Mizuki Saito; Takumi Kanai	China; Pan Lixi; Li Lingxiao; Ma Dong	France; Tom Jourdan; Florian Bugalho; Maxime Decker-Breitel

== See also ==
- Gymnastics at the 2016 Summer Olympics
