= Water skiing at the 2017 World Games – Men's wakeboard =

Water skiing - Men's Wakeboard at the 2017 World Games
- Venue: Old Odra River, Wrocław, Poland
- Dates: 25–27 July 2017
- Competitors: 18 from 16 nations

Medalists
gold medal	(Japan) Shota Tezuka
silver medal	(South Korea) Yun Sang-hyun
bronze medal	(Israel) Guy Firer

The men's wakeboard freestyle competition in water skiing at the 2017 World Games took place from 25 to 27 July 2017 at the Old Odra River in Wrocław, Poland.

== Competition format ==
A total of 18 athletes entered the competition. In quarterfinals two best athletes qualify to the next round. Athletes who can't qualify through quarterfinals takes last chance qualifiers, from which the best athlete qualifies to semifinals. From semifinals three best athletes qualifies to the final.

== Results ==
=== Quarterfinals ===
Heat 1

Rank	Name	Country	Result	Notes
1	Dan Powers	United States	46.56	Q
2	Guy Firer	Israel	45.00	Q
3	Robbie McMillin	Canada	35.67	R
4	Branco Bernardo	Portugal	34.67	R

Heat 3

Rank	Name	Country	Result	Notes
1	David O'Caoimh	(Republic of Ireland) Ireland	57.22	Q
2	Yun Sang-hyun	South Korea	53.33	Q
3	Jamie Huser	Switzerland	36.78	R
4	Bryce Corrand	France	31.56	R
5	Roberts Linavskis	Latvia	31.44	R

Heat 2

Rank	Name	Country	Result	Notes
1	Beto Perez	Mexico	45.22	Q
2	Lucas Langlois	France	41.56	Q
3	Mike Cotton	Australia	41.22	R
4	Mitch Daniel	Australia	38.11	R

Heat 4

Rank	Name	Country	Result	Notes
1	Shota Tezuka	Japan	59.00	Q
2	Dan Nott	(United Kingdom) Great Britain	51.22	Q
3	Alejo De Palma	Argentina	39.22	R
4	Juan Martin Velez	Colombia	34.89	R
5	Jordan Darwin	Spain	29.11	R

=== Last Chance Qualifiers ===
Heat 1

Rank	Name	Country	Result	Notes
1	Alejo De Palma	Argentina	42.78	Q
2	Robbie McMillin	Canada	40.89	
3	Mitch Daniel	Australia	36.67	
4	Bryce Corrand	France	35.22	
5	Roberts Linavskis	Latvia	30.67	

Heat 2

Rank	Name	Country	Result	Notes
1	Juan Martin Velez	Colombia	48.22	Q
2	Jamie Huser	Switzerland	41.11	
3	Branco Bernardo	Portugal	37.89	
4	Mike Cotton	Australia	36.22	
5	Jordan Darwin	Spain	30.78	

=== Semifinals ===
Heat 1

Rank	Name	Country	Result	Notes
1	Yun Sang-hyun	South Korea	75.78	Q
2	Juan Martin Velez	Colombia	55.44	Q
3	Beto Perez	Mexico	54.56	Q
4	Dan Powers	United States	53.56	
5	Dan Nott	(United Kingdom) Great Britain	45.67	

Heat 2

Rank	Name	Country	Result	Notes
1	Shota Tezuka	Japan	83.33	Q
2	Guy Firer	Israel	71.67	Q
3	David O'Caoimh	(Republic of Ireland) Ireland	70.78	Q
4	Alejo De Palma	Argentina	42.78	
5	Lucas Langlois	France	10.44	

=== Final ===
Rank	Name	Country	Result
1st place, gold medalist(s)	Shota Tezuka	Japan	87.89
2nd place, silver medalist(s)	Yun Sang-hyun	South Korea	76.22
3rd place, bronze medalist(s)	Guy Firer	Israel	70.89
4	Beto Perez	Mexico	56.89
5	Juan Martin Velez	Colombia	46.22
6	David O'Caoimh	(Republic of Ireland) Ireland	19.22
