= Sumo at the 2017 World Games – Men's middleweight =

Sumo - Men's Middleweight at the 2017 World Games
- Venue: Orbita Hall, Wrocław, Poland
- Dates: 22 July 2017
- Competitors: 15 from 11 nations

Medalists
| gold medal | (Russia) Atsamaz Kaziev |
| silver medal | (Egypt) Misbah Hossam |
| bronze medal | (Mongolia) Usukhbayar Ochirkhuu |

The men's middleweight competition in sumo at the 2017 World Games took place on 22 July 2017 at the Orbita Hall in Wrocław, Poland.

== Competition format ==
A total of 15 athletes entered the competition. They fought in the cup system with repechages.

== Results ==
=== Main draw ===
| | Score | |
1/16 Finals
| (Russia) Atsamaz Kaziev (RUS) | | Bye |
| (United States) Colton Runyan (USA) | Oshidashi | (Australia) Daniel Bazzana (AUS) |
| (Ukraine) Mykola Kozhukhov (UKR) | Oshitaoshi | (Japan) Kiyoyuki Noguchi (JPN) |
| (Poland) Michał Luto (POL) | Uwatedashinage | (Venezuela) Walter Rivas (VEN) |
| (Mongolia) Usukhbayar Ochirkhuu (MGL) | Uwatenage | (Australia) Eoghn Tivoli (AUS) |
| (Poland) Aron Rozum (POL) | Utccari | (Japan) Hayato Miwa (JPN) |
| (United States) Kena Heffernan (USA) | Yorikiri | (Egypt) Misbah Hossam (EGY) |
| (Georgia (country)) Giorgi Meshildishvili (GEO) | Oshitaoshi | (Brazil) Takahiro Higuchi (BRA) |
Quarterfinals
| (Russia) Atsamaz Kaziev (RUS) | Uwatenage | (United States) Colton Runyan (USA) |
| (Japan) Kiyoyuki Noguchi (JPN) | Hikiotoshi | (Poland) Michał Luto (POL) |
| (Mongolia) Usukhbayar Ochirkhuu (MGL) | Yorikiri | (Poland) Aron Rozum (POL) |
| (Egypt) Misbah Hossam (EGY) | Yorikiri | (Georgia (country)) Giorgi Meshildishvili (GEO) |

=== Repechages ===
| | Score | |
1/16 Repechages
| (United States) Colton Runyan (USA) | | Bye |
| (Japan) Kiyoyuki Noguchi (JPN) | Sakatottari | (Venezuela) Walter Rivas (VEN) |
| (Poland) Aron Rozum (POL) | Yorikiri | (Australia) Eoghn Tivoli (AUS) |
| (Georgia (country)) Giorgi Meshildishvili (GEO) | Komatasukui | (United States) Kena Heffernan (USA) |
Repechages Quarterfinals
| (United States) Colton Runyan (USA) | Sukuinage | (Venezuela) Walter Rivas (VEN) |
| (Poland) Aron Rozum (POL) | Yorikiri | (Georgia (country)) Giorgi Meshildishvili (GEO) |

=== Semifinals ===
| | Score | |
Semifinals
| (Russia) Atsamaz Kaziev (RUS) | Yoritaoshi | (Poland) Michał Luto (POL) |
| (Mongolia) Usukhbayar Ochirkhuu (MGL) | Yoritaoshi | (Egypt) Misbah Hossam (EGY) |
Repechages Semifinals
| (Mongolia) Usukhbayar Ochirkhuu (MGL) | Yoritaoshi | (Venezuela) Walter Rivas (VEN) |
| (Poland) Michał Luto (POL) | Yorikiri | (Poland) Aron Rozum (POL) |

=== Finals ===
| | Score | |
Gold medal match
| (Russia) Atsamaz Kaziev (RUS) | Yorikiri | (Egypt) Misbah Hossam (EGY) |
Bronze medal match
| (Mongolia) Usukhbayar Ochirkhuu (MGL) | Yorikiri | (Poland) Aron Rozum (POL) |
