= Sumo at the 2017 World Games – Men's heavyweight =

Sumo - Men's Heavyweight at the 2017 World Games
- Venue: Orbita Hall, Wrocław, Poland
- Dates: 22 July 2017
- Competitors: 16 from 10 nations

Medalists
gold medal	(Russia) Vasilii Margiev
silver medal	(Egypt) Ramy Belal
bronze medal	(Japan) Soichiro Kurokawa

The men's heavyweight competition in sumo at the 2017 World Games took place on 22 July 2017 at the Orbita Hall in Wrocław, Poland.

== Competition format ==
A total of 16 athletes entered the competition. They fought in the cup system with repechages.

== Results ==
=== Main draw ===
	Score	
1/16 Finals
(Russia) Vasilii Margiev (RUS)	Yorikiri	(Poland) Jacek Piersiak (POL)
(United States) Michael Wietecha (USA)	Oshidashi	(Egypt) Ibrahim Abdellatif (EGY)
(Japan) Soichiro Kurokawa (JPN)	Yorikiri	(Mongolia) Natsagdorj Dugersuren (MGL)
(Brazil) Flavio Tooru Kosaihira (BRA)	Yorikiri	(Ukraine) Oleksandr Veresiuk (UKR)
(Egypt) Ramy Belal (EGY)	Okuridashi	(United States) Mark Lawrence (USA)
(Georgia (country)) Avtandil Tsertsvadze (GEO)	Tsukidashi	(Mongolia) Ulambayaryn Byambajav (MGL)
(Russia) Eduard Kudzoev (RUS)	Oshidashi	(Hong Kong) Brandon Ng Tsz-Shing (HKG)
(Ukraine) Serhii Sokolovskiy (UKR)	Yuritaoshi	(Japan) Kojiro Kurokawa (JPN)
Quarterfinals
(Russia) Vasilii Margiev (RUS)	Tsukiotoshi	(United States) Michael Wietecha (USA)
(Japan) Soichiro Kurokawa (JPN)	Yorikiri	(Ukraine) Oleksandr Veresiuk (UKR)
(Egypt) Ramy Belal (EGY)	Kotenage	(Georgia (country)) Avtandil Tsertsvadze (GEO)
(Russia) Eduard Kudzoev (RUS)	Oshidashi	(Japan) Kojiro Kurokawa (JPN)

=== Repechages ===
	Score	
1/16 Repechages
(United States) Michael Wietecha (USA)	Yoritaoshi	(Poland) Jacek Piersiak (POL)
(Ukraine) Oleksandr Veresiuk (UKR)	Yorikiri	(Mongolia) Natsagdorj Dugersuren (MGL)
(Georgia (country)) Avtandil Tsertsvadze (GEO)	Yorikiri	(United States) Mark Lawrence (USA)
(Russia) Eduard Kudzoev (RUS)	Tsukiotoshi	(Ukraine) Serhii Sokolovskiy (UKR)
Repechages Quarterfinals
(Poland) Jacek Piersiak (POL)	Sukuinage	(Mongolia) Natsagdorj Dugersuren (MGL)
(Georgia (country)) Avtandil Tsertsvadze (GEO)	Yorikiri	(Russia) Eduard Kudzoev (RUS)

=== Semifinals ===
	Score	
Semifinals
(Russia) Vasilii Margiev (RUS)	Yorikiri	(Japan) Soichiro Kurokawa (JPN)
(Egypt) Ramy Belal (EGY)	Tsukiotoshi	(Japan) Kojiro Kurokawa (JPN)
Repechages Semifinals
(Japan) Kojiro Kurokawa (JPN)	Yorikiri	(Poland) Jacek Piersiak (POL)
(Japan) Soichiro Kurokawa (JPN)	Shitatenage	(Georgia (country)) Avtandil Tsertsvadze (GEO)

=== Finals ===
	Score	
Gold medal match
(Russia) Vasilii Margiev (RUS)	Yorikiri	(Egypt) Ramy Belal (EGY)
Bronze medal match
(Japan) Kojiro Kurokawa (JPN)	Yorikiri	(Japan) Soichiro Kurokawa (JPN)
