= Lacrosse at the 2017 World Games =

- Venue: Oławka Stadium
- Dates: 27–30 July 2017
- Teams: 6

Medalists
1st place, gold medalist(s)		United States
2nd place, silver medalist(s)		Canada
3rd place, bronze medalist(s)		Australia

The lacrosse competition at the 2017 World Games took place in Wrocław, Poland from 27 to 30 July 2017.

The sport debuted in the World Games for this edition. Only a women's tournament was held under the traditional 10-a-side format. Starting the next edition, the lacrosse sixes format was used.

== Schedule ==
P	Preliminary	F	Final

Oławka Stadium
Event↓/Date →	Thu 27	Fri 28	Sat 29	Sun 30
Women's field	P		F	

Source: 2017 World Games

== Participating nations ==
- Australia
- Canada
- Great Britain
- Japan
- Poland
- United States

== Tournament ==
=== Preliminary round ===
Pos	Team	Pld	W	L	GF	GA	GD	Qualification
1	United States	2	2	0	34	6	+28	Advance to Semifinals
2	Canada	2	2	0	33	15	+18	Advance to Semifinals
3	Australia	2	1	1	33	15	+18	Advance to Semifinals
4	Great Britain	2	1	1	15	19	−4	Advance to Semifinals
5	Japan	2	0	2	10	27	−17	Advance to 5th place game
6	Poland (H)	2	0	2	0	43	−43	Advance to 5th place game

Source: 2017 World Games
(H) Hosts

27 July 2017; 10:00	United States	20−0	Poland	Oławka Stadium, Wrocław

Game reference

27 July 2017; 13:00	Great Britain	9−5	Japan	Oławka Stadium, Wrocław

Game reference

27 July 2017; 16:00	Canada	15−10	Australia	Oławka Stadium, Wrocław

Game reference

28 July 2017; 10:00	United States	14−6	Great Britain	Oławka Stadium, Wrocław

Game reference

28 July 2017; 13:00	Poland	0−23	Australia	Oławka Stadium, Wrocław

Game reference

28 July 2017; 16:00	Canada	18−5	Japan	Oławka Stadium, Wrocław

Game reference

=== Knockout stage ===
==== Bracket ====
Semifinals
29 July
United States	18
Great Britain	5
29 July
Canada	14
Australia	8

Final
30 July
United States	11
Canada	8
Third place
30 July
Great Britain	8
Australia	10

==== Semifinals ====
29 July 2017; 10:00	United States	18−5	Great Britain	Oławka Stadium, Wrocław

Game reference

29 July 2017; 13:00	Canada	14−8	Australia	Oławka Stadium, Wrocław

Game reference

==== 5th place game ====
30 July 2017; 9:00	Japan	19−1	Poland	Oławka Stadium, Wrocław

Game reference

==== Bronze medal game ====
30 July 2017; 11:30	Great Britain	8−10	Australia	Oławka Stadium, Wrocław

Game reference

==== Gold medal game ====
30 July 2017; 14:00	United States	11−8	Canada	Oławka Stadium, Wrocław

Game reference

== Medalists ==
Event	Gold	Silver	Bronze
Women's field	United States: Devon Wills; Kelly Rabil; Katie Schwarzmann; Kristen Carr; Jen Russell; Alyssa Murray; Brooke Griffin; Taylor Cummings; Marie Mccool; Megan Douty; Gussie Johns; Ally Carey; Becca Block; Michelle Tumolo; Alice Mercer	Canada: Allison Daley; Quintin Hoch-Bullen; Kaylin Morissette; Tessa Chad; Katie Guy; Holly Lloyd; Erica Evans; Megan Kinna; Lydia Sutton; Claire Mills; Emily Boisonneault; Taylor Gait; Avery Hogarth; Dana Dobbie; Tory Merrill	Australia: Abbie Burgess; Courtney Hobbs; Rebecca Lane; Stella Justice-Allen; Megan Barnett; Bonnie Wells; Sachiyo Yamada; Sarah Mollison; Sarah Lowe; Theadora Kwas; Ashtyn Hiron; Rebecca Banyard; Verity Clough; Beth Varga; Elizabeth Hinkes

Source: 2017 World Games

== Final ranking ==
Rank	Team
1st place, gold medalist(s)	United States
2nd place, silver medalist(s)	Canada
3rd place, bronze medalist(s)	Australia
4	Great Britain
5	Japan
6	Poland
