= Ju-jitsu at the 2017 World Games – Men's ne-waza 62 kg =

Men's ne-waza 62 kg at the 2017 World Games
- Venue: GEM Sports Complex
- Date: 28 July 2017
- Competitors: 6 from 6 nations

Medalists
1st place, gold medalist(s)		(Poland) Jędrzej Loska
2nd place, silver medalist(s)		(Colombia) Jairo Alejandro Viviescas Ortíz
3rd place, bronze medalist(s)		(Japan) Joao Carlos Hiroshi Kuraoka

The men's ne-waza 62 kg competition in ju-jitsu at the 2017 World Games took place on 28 July 2017 at the GEM Sports Complex in Wrocław, Poland.

== Results ==
=== Elimination round ===
==== Group A ====
Rank	Athlete	B	W	L	Pts	Score
1	Joao Carlos Hiroshi Kuraoka (JPN)	2	2	0	108–2	+106
2	Jędrzej Loska (POL)	2	1	1	102–8	+94
3	Yared Nigusse Dechassa (ETH)	2	0	2	0–200	–200

	Score	
Jędrzej Loska (POL)	2–8	Joao Carlos Hiroshi Kuraoka (JPN)
Jędrzej Loska (POL)	100–0	Yared Nigusse Dechassa (ETH)
Joao Carlos Hiroshi Kuraoka (JPN)	100–0	Yared Nigusse Dechassa (ETH)

==== Group B ====
Rank	Athlete	B	W	L	Pts	Score
1	Ron Cohen (ISR)	2	2	0	4–2	+2
2	Jairo Alejandro Viviescas Ortíz (COL)	2	1	1	5–0	+5
3	Mihai Handrea (ROU)	2	0	2	2–9	–7

	Score	
Ron Cohen (ISR)	0–0	Jairo Alejandro Viviescas Ortíz (COL)
Ron Cohen (ISR)	4–2	Mihai Handrea (ROU)
Jairo Alejandro Viviescas Ortíz (COL)	5–0	Mihai Handrea (ROU)

=== Finals ===
Semifinals
Joao Carlos Hiroshi Kuraoka (JPN)	0
Jairo Alejandro Viviescas Ortíz (COL)	1
Ron Cohen (ISR)	4
Jędrzej Loska (POL)	100

Final
Jairo Alejandro Viviescas Ortíz (COL)	0
Jędrzej Loska (POL)	100
Third place
Joao Carlos Hiroshi Kuraoka (JPN)	5
Ron Cohen (ISR)	2
