= Ju-jitsu at the 2017 World Games – Men's ne-waza 77 kg =

Men's ne-waza 77 kg at the 2017 World Games
- Venue: GEM Sports Complex
- Date: 28 July 2017
- Competitors: 6 from 6 nations

Medalists
1st place, gold medalist(s)		(Switzerland) Ilke Kubilay Bulut
2nd place, silver medalist(s)		(Belgium) Wim Deputter
3rd place, bronze medalist(s)		(Poland) Maciej Kozak

The men's ne-waza 77 kg competition in ju-jitsu at the 2017 World Games took place on 28 July 2017 at the GEM Sports Complex in Wrocław, Poland.

== Results ==
=== Elimination round ===
==== Group A ====
Rank	Athlete	B	W	L	Pts	Score
1	Maciej Kozak (POL)	2	2	0	100–0	+100
2	Mohamed Al-Qubaisi (UAE)	2	1	1	0–0	0
3	Jonathan Charlot (MRI)	2	0	2	0–100	–100

	Score	
Maciej Kozak (POL)	0–0	Mohamed Al-Qubaisi (UAE)
Maciej Kozak (POL)	100–0	Jonathan Charlot (MRI)
Mohamed Al-Qubaisi (UAE)	0–0	Jonathan Charlot (MRI)

==== Group B ====
Rank	Athlete	B	W	L	Pts	Score
1	Ilke Kubilay Bulut (SUI)	2	2	0	15–0	+15
2	Wim Deputter (BEL)	2	1	1	2–2	0
3	Dinu Bucalet (ROU)	2	0	2	0–15	–15

	Score	
Wim Deputter (BEL)	0–2	Ilke Kubilay Bulut (SUI)
Wim Deputter (BEL)	2–0	Dinu Bucalet (ROU)
Ilke Kubilay Bulut (SUI)	13–0	Dinu Bucalet (ROU)

=== Finals ===
Semifinals
Maciej Kozak (POL)	0
Wim Deputter (BEL)	1
Ilke Kubilay Bulut (SUI)	14
Mohamed Al-Qubaisi (UAE)	0

Final
Wim Deputter (BEL)	2
Ilke Kubilay Bulut (SUI)	12
Third place
Maciej Kozak (POL)	6
Mohamed Al-Qubaisi (UAE)	0
