= Tug of war at the 2017 World Games =

- Dates: 29-30 July 2017
- Competitors: 173 from 10 nations

The tug of war competition at the 2017 World Games in Wrocław, Poland was held on July 29 and July 30.

== Participating nations ==
- Belgium (11)
- China (9)
- Chinese Taipei (9)
- Great Britain (22)
- Germany (21)
- Ireland (20)
- Netherlands (33)
- South Africa (9)
- Switzerland (25)
- Sweden (14)

== Medal table ==
Rank	Nation	Gold	Silver	Bronze	Total
1	Switzerland (SUI)	1	1	0	2
2	Great Britain (GBR)	1	0	1	2
3	Chinese Taipei (TPE)	1	0	0	1
4	China (CHN)	0	1	0	1
4	Netherlands (NED)	0	1	0	1
6	Germany (GER)	0	0	1	1
6	South Africa (RSA)	0	0	1	1
8	Belgium (BEL)	0	0	0	0
8	Ireland (IRL)	0	0	0	0
8	Sweden (SWE)	0	0	0	0
Totals (10 entries)		3	3	3	9

== Medalists ==
Event	Gold	Silver	Bronze
Men's outdoor 640 kg	Great Britain; David Callcutt; Ian Daniels; Wayne Evans; David Field; David Hammersley; Edward Holland; James Murphy; Edward Shannon; Adrian Webb	Switzerland; Vinzenz Arnold; Peter Erni; Erich Joller; Stefan Krause; Christoph Rölli; Fabian Rölli; Philipp Rölli; Lukas Vogel	Germany; Philipp Berl; Markus Böhler; Lucas Broghammer; Daniel Fien; Patrick Frank; Stefan Heimann; Martin Higel; Manfred Klingele
Men's outdoor 700 kg	Switzerland; Vinzenz Arnold; Peter Erni; Erich Joller; Peter Joller; Stefan Krause; Christoph Rölli; Fabian Rölli; Philipp Rölli	Netherlands; Johannes Bartels; Gerrit Bijenhof; Robin Boerstoel; Gerolph Hoff; Jeroen Nieuwenhuis; Gerbert Schutte; Gerrit Uilenreef; Vincent Wagenmans	Great Britain; David Bowyer; James Dewsberry; Leonard Jarram; William Lee; James Murphy; Ian Robinson; Lee Robinson; Justin Sheppard
Women's indoor 540 kg	Chinese Taipei; Chen Tzu-jung (陳姿蓉); Cheng Huai-yun (鄭懷云); Huang Ting-yi (黃婷宜); Kao Chia-yi (高佳儀); Kao Chiao-yi (高巧宜); Li Ju-chun (李洳君); Li Ting-hsuan (李庭瑄); Li Yun-chi (李勻錡); Tien Chia-jung (田嘉蓉)	China; Guo Xue; Hu Yanli; Liu Yingying; Qin Jiao; Song Dan; Tian Tian (田甜); Xu Na; Yan Chen; Zhang Jiaqi	South Africa; Jancke de Wet; Ané Ras; René Ras; Claudia Rix; Leonell Steyn; Nadine Stoop; Kittie Terblanche; Samantha Wilmot
