= Sport climbing at the 2017 World Games – Men's lead =

Sport climbing - Men's Lead at the 2017 World Games
- Venue: Nowy Targ Square, Wrocław, Poland
- Dates: 23 July 2017
- Competitors: 10 from 9 nations

Medalists
gold medal	(Japan) Keiichiro Korenaga
silver medal	(Japan) Yuki Hada
bronze medal	(Canada) Sean McColl

The men's lead competition in sport climbing at the 2017 World Games took place on 23 July 2017 at the Nowy Targ Square in Wrocław, Poland.

== Competition format ==
A total of 10 athletes entered the competition. In qualification every athlete has 1 chance to get to the higher point of the course. Top 8 climbers qualify to final. In final if at least 2 climbers have the same score climber, who get the height faster is placing higher.

== Results ==
=== Qualifications ===
Rank	Athlete	Nation	Height	Note
1	Romain Desgranges	France	34	Q
2	Keiichiro Korenaga	Japan	31	Q
3	Yuki Hada	Japan	29	Q
4	Domen Škofic	Slovenia	21+	Q
5	Campbell Harrison	Australia	20+	Q
5	Sean McColl	Canada	20+	Q
5	Francesco Vettorata	Italy	20+	Q
5	Maciej Dobrzański	Poland	20+	Q
9	Ramón Julián Puigblanqué	Spain	13+	
9	Oliver Marx	South Africa	13+	

=== Final ===
Rank	Athlete	Nation	Height
1st place, gold medalist(s)	Keiichiro Korenaga	Japan	32+
2nd place, silver medalist(s)	Yuki Hada	Japan	32+
3rd place, bronze medalist(s)	Sean McColl	Canada	29+
4	Romain Desgranges	France	22+
5	Domen Škofic	Slovenia	22+
6	Francesco Vettorata	Italy	22+
7	Maciej Dobrzański	Poland	22
8	Campbell Harrison	Australia	19
