= Sumo at the 2017 World Games – Women's middleweight =

Sumo - Women's Middleweight at the 2017 World Games
- Venue: Orbita Hall, Wrocław, Poland
- Dates: 22 July 2017
- Competitors: 16 from 10 nations

Medalists
gold medal	(Mongolia) Munkhtsetseg Otgon
silver medal	(Japan) Asano Ota
bronze medal	(Ukraine) Maryna Maksymenko

The women's middleweight competition in sumo at the 2017 World Games took place on 22 July 2017 at the Orbita Hall in Wrocław, Poland.

== Competition format ==
A total of 16 athletes entered the competition. They fought in the cup system with repechages.

== Results ==
=== Main draw ===
	Score	
1/16 Finals
(Ukraine) Maryna Maksymenko (UKR)	Oshidashi	(Japan) Hikaru Mizunuma (JPN)
(Venezuela) Yaseny Castillo (VEN)	Yorikiri	(Poland) Marina Rozum (POL)
(Russia) Anna Aleksandrova (RUS)	Uwatenage	(Germany) Kerstin Schidtsdorf (GER)
(Mongolia) Munkhtstetseg Otgon (MGL)	Yorikiri	(Brazil) Fernanda Rojas Pelegrini (BRA)
(Japan) Asano Ota (JPN)	Oshidashi	(Venezuela) Ofelia Barrios (VEN)
(Thailand) Kamonchanok Amnuaypol (THA)	Yoritaoshi	(Brazil) Daniela de Oliviera Vaqueiro (BRA)
(Russia) Ekaterina Alekseeva (RUS)	Shitatenage	(Poland) Olimpia Robakowska (POL)
(Brazil) Juliana de Paula Medeiros (BRA)	Oshitaoshi	(United States) Sonya del Gallego (USA)
Quarterfinals
(Japan) Hikaru Mizunuma (JPN)	Sukuinage	(Poland) Marina Rozum (POL)
(Russia) Anna Aleksandrova (RUS)	Shitatenage	(Mongolia) Munkhtstetseg Otgon (MGL)
(Japan) Asano Ota (JPN)	Yoritaoshi	(Thailand) Kamonchanok Amnuaypol (THA)
(Poland) Olimpia Robakowska (POL)	Yorikiri	(Brazil) Juliana de Paula Medeiros (BRA)

=== Repechages ===
	Score	
1/16 Repechages
(Poland) Marina Rozum (POL)	Hikiotoshi	(Ukraine) Maryna Maksymenko (UKR)
(Russia) Anna Aleksandrova (RUS)	Uwatenage	(Brazil) Fernanda Rojas Pelegrini (BRA)
(Thailand) Kamonchanok Amnuaypol (THA)	Yorikiri	(Venezuela) Ofelia Barrios (VEN)
(Brazil) Juliana de Paula Medeiros (BRA)	Yorikiri	(Russia) Ekaterina Alekseeva (RUS)
Repechages Quarterfinals
(Ukraine) Maryna Maksymenko (UKR)	Yorikiri	(Russia) Anna Aleksandrova (RUS)
(Thailand) Kamonchanok Amnuaypol (THA)	Yoritaoshi	(Brazil) Juliana de Paula Medeiros (BRA)

=== Semifinals ===
	Score	
Semifinals
(Japan) Hikaru Mizunuma (JPN)	Uwatenage	(Mongolia) Munkhtstetseg Otgon (MGL)
(Japan) Asano Ota (JPN)	Uwatehineri	(Poland) Olimpia Robakowska (POL)
Repechages Semifinals
(Poland) Olimpia Robakowska (POL)	Sukuinage	(Ukraine) Maryna Maksymenko (UKR)
(Japan) Hikaru Mizunuma (JPN)	Yorikiri	(Brazil) Juliana de Paula Medeiros (BRA)

=== Finals ===
	Score	
Gold medal match
(Mongolia) Munkhtstetseg Otgon (MGL)	Yorikiri	(Japan) Asano Ota (JPN)
Bronze medal match
(Ukraine) Maryna Maksymenko (UKR)	Yoritaoshi	(Japan) Hikaru Mizunuma (JPN)
