= Acrobatic gymnastics at the 2017 World Games – Men's pairs all-around =

Men's pairs all-around at the World Games
- Venue: Centennial Hall, Wrocław, Poland
- Date: 25 July 2017
- Competitors: 12 from 6 nations
- Winning total: 29.310 points

Medalists
1st place, gold medalist(s)		Tim Sebastian; Michael Kraft	Germany
2nd place, silver medalist(s)		Igor Mishev; Nikolay Suprunov	Russia
3rd place, bronze medalist(s)		Kilian Goffaux; Robin Casse	Belgium

The men's pairs all-around competition at the 2017 World Games in Wrocław was played on 25 July. 12 acrobatic gymnastics competitors, from 6 nations, participated in the tournament. The acrobatic gymnastics competition took place at Centennial Hall in Lower Silesian Voivodeship.

== Competition format ==
The top 4 teams in qualifications, based on combined scores of each apparatus, advanced to the final. In the final, each team selected three gymnasts to compete on each apparatus. All scores on each apparatus were summed to give a final team score. The scores in qualification do not count in the final.

== Qualification ==
Team	Balance		Dynamic		Total (All-around)	
Team	Score	Rank	Score	Rank	Score	Rank
Belgium	27.920	1	28.970	1	56.740	1
Germany	27.690	3	28.820	2	56.660	2
Russia	27.820	2	28.490	3	56.310	3
China	27.500	4	28.000	4	55.500	4
Great Britain	27.390	5	27.640	5	55.030	5
Israel	27.185	6	26.990	6	54.175	6

== Final ==
Rank	Team	Difficulty	Artistry	Execution	Penalty	Total (All-around)
Rank	Team	Score	Score	Score	Score	Score
1st place, gold medalist(s)	Germany	2.010	9.	18.200	-0.000	29.310
2nd place, silver medalist(s)	Russia	2.340	8.950	17.800	-0.000	29.090
3rd place, bronze medalist(s)	Belgium	2.050	9.100	17.400	-0.000	28.550
4	China	2.500	8.550	17.300	-0.000	28.350

== Final standing ==
Rank	Team
1st place, gold medalist(s)	Germany
2nd place, silver medalist(s)	Russia
3rd place, bronze medalist(s)	Belgium
4	China
5	Great Britain
6	Israel

== Medalists ==
Event	Gold	Silver	Bronze
Pairs all-around	Germany; Tim Sebastian; Michael Kraft	Russia; Igor Mishev; Nikolay Suprunov	Belgium; Kilian Goffaux; Robin Casse

== See also ==
- Acrobatic gymnastics at the 2017 World Games – Men's group all-around
- Acrobatic gymnastics at the 2017 World Games – Women's pairs all-around
- Acrobatic gymnastics at the 2017 World Games – Mixed pairs all-around
