= Cue sports at the 2017 World Games =

- The pictogram of Cue sports
- Venue: Wroclaw Congress Center
- Dates: 26–30 July 2017
- Competitors: 64 from 34 nations

The cue sports competition at the World Games 2017, including three-cushion billiards, nine-ball (a pool discipline) and snooker, took place from 26 to 30 July at the Wroclaw Congress Center in Wrocław, Poland.

== Participating nations ==
- Australia (1)
- Austria (1)
- Belgium (2)
- Chile (1)
- China (4)
- Chinese Taipei (2)
- Colombia (1)
- Costa Rica (1)
- Egypt (1)
- Estonia (1)
- Germany (2)
- Great Britain (5)
- Greece (1)
- Hong Kong (1)
- India (1)
- Iran (1)
- Ireland (2)
- Italy (1)
- Japan (3)
- Morocco (1)
- Nicaragua (1)
- Netherlands (1)
- New Zealand (2)
- Pakistan (1)
- Philippines (2)
- Poland (5)
- Russia (3)
- South Africa (2)
- South Korea (1)
- Spain (3)
- Switzerland (2)
- Turkey (1)
- United States (6)
- Vietnam (1)

== Medalists ==
Event	Gold	Silver	Bronze
Men's 3-cushion carom	Daniel Sánchez; Spain	Marco Zanetti; Italy	Sameh Sidhom; Egypt
Men's 9-ball pool	Carlo Biado; Philippines	Jayson Shaw; Great Britain	Naoyuki Ōi; Japan
Women's 9-ball pool	Chen Siming; China	Kim Ga-young; South Korea	Han Yu; China
Snooker	Kyren Wilson; Great Britain	Ali Carter; Great Britain	Soheil Vahedi; Iran

== Medal table ==
Rank	Nation	Gold	Silver	Bronze	Total
1	Great Britain	1	2	0	3
2	China	1	0	1	2
3	Philippines	1	0	0	1
3	Spain	1	0	0	1
5	Italy	0	1	0	1
5	South Korea	0	1	0	1
7	Egypt	0	0	1	1
7	Iran	0	0	1	1
7	Japan	0	0	1	1
Totals (9 entries)		4	4	4	12
