= Ju-jitsu at the 2017 World Games – Men's ne-waza 69 kg =

Men's ne-waza 69 kg at the 2017 World Games
- Venue: GEM Sports Complex
- Date: 28 July 2017
- Competitors: 7 from 7 nations

Medalists
1st place, gold medalist(s)		(France) Haidar Raza Abbas
2nd place, silver medalist(s)		(Poland) Maciej Polok
3rd place, bronze medalist(s)		(Israel) Evyatar Paperni

The men's ne-waza 69 kg competition in ju-jitsu at the 2017 World Games took place on 28 July 2017 at the GEM Sports Complex in Wrocław, Poland.

== Results ==
=== Gold medal bracket ===
Quarterfinals
(Israel) Evyatar Paperni (ISR)	4
(United Arab Emirates) Talib Al-Kirbi (UAE)	4
(France) Haidar Reza Abbas (FRA)	2
(Lebanon) Daniel Hilal (LBN)	0
(Russia) Zainutdin Zainukov (RUS)	100
(Belgium) Salvatore Liga (BEL)	2

Semifinals
(Poland) Maciej Polok (POL)	100
(United Arab Emirates) Talib Al-Kirbi (UAE)	0
(France) Haidar Reza Abbas (FRA)	4
(Russia) Zainutdin Zainukov (RUS)	2

Final
(Poland) Maciej Polok (POL)	4
(France) Haidar Reza Abbas (FRA)	4

=== Bronze medal bracket ===
Quarterfinals
(Lebanon) Daniel Hilal (LBN)	100
(Belgium) Salvatore Liga (BEL)	2

Semifinals
(Israel) Evyatar Paperni (ISR)	4
(Russia) Zainutdin Zainukov (RUS)	0
(Lebanon) Daniel Hilal (LBN)	0
(United Arab Emirates) Talib Al-Kirbi (UAE)	100

Bronze medal match
(Israel) Evyatar Paperni (ISR)	0
(United Arab Emirates) Talib Al-Kirbi (UAE)	0
