= Sport climbing at the 2017 World Games – Men's boulder =

Sport climbing – Men's Boulder at the 2017 World Games
- Venue: Nowy Targ Square, Wrocław, Poland
- Dates: 21 July 2017
- Competitors: 12 from 9 nations

Medalists
gold medal	(Japan) Yoshiyuki Ogata
silver medal	(Germany) Jan Hojer
bronze medal	(Russia) Alexey Rubtsov

The men's boulder competition in sport climbing at the 2017 World Games took place on 21 July 2017 at the Nowy Targ Square in Wrocław, Poland.

== Competition format ==
A total of 12 athletes entered the competition. In qualification every athlete has to get on the top of 4 boulders. Top 6 climbers qualify to final.

== Results ==
=== Qualifications ===
Rank	Athlete	Nation	Result	Note
1	Tomoa Narasaki	Japan	3t6 4b6	Q
2	Alexey Rubtsov	Russia	2t7 4b9	Q
3	Yoshiyuki Ogata	Japan	2t11 4b9	Q
4	Jan Hojer	Germany	2t14 3b3	Q
5	Mickaël Mawem	France	1t3 4b11	Q
6	Manuel Cornu	France	1t9 4b14	Q
7	Kokoro Fujii	Japan	0t 3b8	
8	Campbell Harrison	Australia	0t 1b2	
9	Borna Cujić	Croatia	0t 1b3	
9	Andrzej Mecherzyński-Wiktor	Poland	0t 1b3	
11	Sean McColl	Canada	0t 1b9	
12	Adam Ludford	South Africa	0t 0b	

=== Final ===
Rank	Athlete	Nation	Result
1st place, gold medalist(s)	Yoshiyuki Ogata	Japan	4t9 4b6
2nd place, silver medalist(s)	Jan Hojer	Germany	3t6 3b4
3rd place, bronze medalist(s)	Alexey Rubtsov	Russia	2t3 4b8
4	Mickaël Mawem	France	2t4 4b7
5	Tomoa Narasaki	Japan	1t4 2b5
6	Manuel Cornu	France	1t5 3b8
