= Sport climbing at the 2017 World Games =

Competition climbing event

Competition climbing at the 2017 World Games
- Venue: Nowy Targ Square
- Location: Wrocław
- Dates: 21–23 July 2017
- Competitors: 63 from 23 nations

The competition climbing events at the World Games 2017 took place from July 21 to July 23, in Wrocław in Poland, at the Nowy Targ Square. 63 sportsmen from 23 nations participated in the competition. It served as a qualifying event for the 2020 Summer Olympics in Tokyo and included the events of competition lead climbing, competition bouldering and competition speed climbing.

== Schedule ==
All times are in Central European Summer Time (UTC+02:00).

Friday, 21 July 2017

- 09:00 Men's Boulder qualification
- 11:30 Women's Boulder qualification
- 16:00 Men's Boulder final
- 18:00 Women's Boulder final

Saturday, 22 July 2017

- 14:00 Men's Speed qualification
- 14:15 Women's Speed qualification
- 17:30-18:00 Men's & Women's Speed final

Sunday, 23 July 2017

- 09:00 Men's & Women's Lead qualification
- 17:00 Men's & Women's Lead final

== Participating nations ==
- Australia (2)
- Austria (2)
- Belgium (1)
- Canada (1)
- China (1)
- Croatia (1)
- Czech Republic (1)
- Ecuador (1)
- France (8)
- Germany (3)
- Indonesia (1)
- Iran (1)
- Italy (3)
- Japan (8)
- Poland (10)
- Russia (7)
- Serbia (1)
- Slovenia (3)
- South Africa (2)
- South Korea (1)
- Spain (1)
- Ukraine (1)
- United States (3)

== Medalists ==
Event	Gold	Silver	Bronze
Men
Boulder	Yoshiyuki Ogata; Japan	Jan Hojer; Germany	Alexey Rubtsov; Russia
Speed	Reza Alipour; Iran	Danylo Boldyrev; Ukraine	Stanislav Kokorin; Russia
Lead	Keiichiro Korenaga; Japan	Yuki Hada; Japan	Sean McColl; Canada
Women
Boulder	Staša Gejo; Serbia	Miho Nonaka; Japan	Fanny Gibert; France
Speed	Iuliia Kaplina; Russia	Anouck Jaubert; France	Anna Tsyganova; Russia
Lead	Anak Verhoeven; Belgium	Janja Garnbret; Slovenia	Julia Chanourdie; France

== Medals table ==
Rank	Nation	Gold	Silver	Bronze	Total
1	Japan (JPN)	2	2	0	4
2	Russia (RUS)	1	0	3	4
3	Belgium (BEL)	1	0	0	1
3	Iran (IRI)	1	0	0	1
3	Serbia (SRB)	1	0	0	1
6	France (FRA)	0	1	2	3
7	Germany (GER)	0	1	0	1
7	Slovenia (SLO)	0	1	0	1
7	Ukraine (UKR)	0	1	0	1
10	Canada (CAN)	0	0	1	1
Totals (10 entries)		6	6	6	18
