= Powerlifting at the 2017 World Games – Women's lightweight =

Powerlifting - Women's Lightweight at the 2017 World Games
- Venue: National Forum of Music, Wrocław, Poland
- Dates: 24 July 2017
- Competitors: 10 from 9 nations

Medalists
gold medal	(Russia) Natalia Salnikova
silver medal	(Japan) Yukako Fukushima
bronze medal	(Chinese Taipei) Chen Wei-ling

The women's lightweight competition in powerlifting at the 2017 World Games took place on 24 July 2017 at the National Forum of Music in Wrocław, Poland.

== Competition format ==
A total of 10 athletes entered the competition. Each athlete had 3 attempts in each of 3 events: squat, bench press and deadlift. The athlete with the biggest score in Wilks points is the winner.

== Results ==
Rank	Athlete	Nation	Weight	Squat	Bench press	Deadlift	Total weight	Total points
1st place, gold medalist(s)	Natalia Salnikova	Russia	50.9	210.0	135.0	180.0	525.0	665.54
2nd place, silver medalist(s)	Yukako Fukushima	Japan	46.4	185.0	135.0	165.0	485.0	657.90
3rd place, bronze medalist(s)	Chen Wei-ling	Chinese Taipei	44.3	185.0	87.5	180.0	452.5	634.54
4	Maria Luisa Vasquez	Puerto Rico	45.4	182.5	110.0	160.0	452.5	623.59
5	Maria Dominguez	Venezuela	52.1	187.5	150.0	162.5	500.0	623.40
6	Frankmary Duno Medina	Venezuela	46.1	170.0	110.0	162.5	442.5	603.04
7	Kateryna Klymenko	Ukraine	51.9	175.0	120.0	172.5	467.5	583.86
8	Stephanie Puddicome	Canada	51.7	170.0	87.5	175.0	432.5	541.84
9	Vanessa Martin	France	51.8	170.0	97.5	165.0	432.5	541.19
	Olimpia Felińska	Poland	51.7	NM	85.0	155.0	DSQ	DSQ
