= Aerobic gymnastics at the 2017 World Games – Open event trio =

Open event trio aerobic gymnastics at the World Games
- Venue: Centennial Hall, Wrocław, Poland
- Date: 22 July 2017
- Competitors: 18 from 6 nations
- Winning total: 22.636 points

Medalists
1st place, gold medalist(s)		Riri Kitazume; Mizuki Saito; Takumi Kanai	Japan
2nd place, silver medalist(s)		Pan Lixi; Li Lingxiao; Ma Dong	China
3rd place, bronze medalist(s)		Tom Jourdan; Florian Bugalho; Maxime Decker-Breitel	France

The open event trio competition at the 2017 World Games in Wrocław was played on 22 July. 18 Aerobic gymnastics competitors, from 6 nations, participated in the tournament. The Aerobic gymnastics competition took place at Centennial Hall in Lower Silesian Voivodeship.

== Competition format ==
The top 4 teams in qualifications, advanced to the final. The scores in qualification do not count in the final.

== Qualification ==
Team	Artistic	Execution	Difficulty	Lift	Total	
Team	Score	Score	Score	Score	Score	Rank
Japan	9.300	8.550	3.611	0.900	22.361	1
China	9.250	8.550	3.300	0.800	21.900	2
Russia	8.950	8.200	3.611	0.800	21.561	3
France	8.950	8.400	3.050	0.500	20.900	4
South Korea	9.100	8.050	2.650	0.800	20.600	5
South Africa	8.150	7.300	2.666	0.400	18.516	6

== Final ==
Rank	Team	Artistic	Execution	Difficulty	Lift	Total
Rank	Team	Score	Score	Score	Score	Score
1st place, gold medalist(s)	Japan	9.375	8.650	3.611	1.000	22.636
2nd place, silver medalist(s)	China	9.175	8.650	3.800	0.800	22.425
3rd place, bronze medalist(s)	France	9.050	8.350	2.950	0.500	20.850
4	Russia	8.600	7.700	2.777	0.800	19.877

== Final standing ==
Rank	Team
1st place, gold medalist(s)	Japan
2nd place, silver medalist(s)	China
3rd place, bronze medalist(s)	France
4	Russia
5	South Korea
6	South Africa

== Medalists ==
Event	Gold	Silver	Bronze
Open event trio	Japan; Riri Kitazume; Mizuki Saito; Takumi Kanai	China; Pan Lixi; Li Lingxiao; Ma Dong	France; Tom Jourdan; Florian Bugalho; Maxime Decker-Breitel
