= Kim Hye-song =

Kim Hye-song may refer to:

- Kim Hye-song (boxer) (born 1984), North Korean female boxer
- Kim Hye-song (gymnast) (born 1997), North Korean female acrobatic gymnast
- Kim Hye-song (runner) (born 1993), North Korean female long-distance runner
- Kim Hye-song (table tennis), North Korean female table tennis player
- Kim Hye-seong (actor) (born 1986), South Korean actor
- Hyeseong Kim (born 1999), South Korean baseball player
