= Acrobatic gymnastics at the 2017 World Games – Men's group all-around =

Men's group all-around at the World Games
- Venue: Centennial Hall, Wrocław, Poland
- Date: 26 July 2017
- Competitors: 24 from 6 nations
- Winning total: 30.450 points

Medalists
1st place, gold medalist(s)		Conor Sawenko; Charlie Tate; Adam Upcott; Lewis Watts	Great Britain
2nd place, silver medalist(s)		Li Zheng; Rui Liuming; Zhang Teng; Zhou Jiahuai	China
3rd place, bronze medalist(s)		Lidar Dana; Yannay Kalfa; Efi Efraim Sach; Daniel Uralevitch	Israel

The men's group all-around competition at the 2017 World Games in Wrocław was played on 26 July. 24 acrobatic gymnastics competitors, from 6 nations, participated in the tournament. The acrobatic gymnastics competition took place at Centennial Hall in Lower Silesian Voivodeship.

== Competition format ==
The top 4 teams in qualifications, based on combined scores of each round, advanced to the final. The scores in qualification do not count in the final.

== Qualification ==
Team	Balance		Dynamic		Total (All-around)	
Team	Score	Rank	Score	Rank	Score	Rank
Great Britain	29.500	2	29.550	1	59.050	1
Israel	29.080	3	29.060	2	58.140	2
China	29.780	1	26.685	5	56.465	3
Russia	24.585	5	28.340	3	52.925	4
Ukraine	24.590	4	27.740	4	52.330	5
Australia	51.630	6	26.100	6	51.630	6

== Final ==
Rank	Team	Difficulty	Artistry	Execution	Penalty	Total (All-around)
Rank	Team	Score	Score	Score	Score	Score
1st place, gold medalist(s)	Great Britain	3.300	9.250	17.900	-0.000	30.450
2nd place, silver medalist(s)	China	3.920	8.900	17.400	-0.000	30.220
3rd place, bronze medalist(s)	Israel	2.950	9.100	16.000	-0.000	28.050
4	Russia	2.970	8.400	15.300	-0.900	25.770

== Final standing ==
Rank	Team
1st place, gold medalist(s)	Great Britain
2nd place, silver medalist(s)	China
3rd place, bronze medalist(s)	Israel
4	Russia
5	Ukraine
6	Australia

== Medalists ==
Event	Gold	Silver	Bronze
Group all-around	Great Britain; Conor Sawenko; Charlie Tate; Adam Upcott; Lewis Watts	China; Li Zheng; Rui Liuming; Zhang Teng; Zhou Jiahuai	Israel; Lidar Dana; Yannay Kalfa; Efi Efraim Sach; Daniel Uralevitch

== See also ==
- Acrobatic gymnastics at the 2017 World Games – Women's group all-around
- Acrobatic gymnastics at the 2017 World Games – Men's pairs all-around
