= Finswimming at the 2017 World Games – Women's 100 m surface =

Finswimming - Women's Surface 100 m at the 2017 World Games
- Venue: Orbita Indoor Swimming Pool, Wrocław, Poland
- Dates: 22 July 2017
- Competitors: 8 from 5 nations

Medalists
gold medal	(Russia) Ekaterina Mikhaylushkina
silver medal	(China) Shu Chengjing
bronze medal	(Russia) Anna Ber

The women's surface 100 m event in finswimming at the 2017 World Games took place on 22 July 2017 at the Orbita Indoor Swimming Pool in Wrocław, Poland.

== Competition format ==
A total of 8 athletes entered the competition. Only final was held.

== Results ==
=== Final ===
Rank	Athlete	Nation	Time
1st place, gold medalist(s)	Ekaterina Mikhaylushkina	Russia	38.40
2nd place, silver medalist(s)	Shu Chengjing	China	38.60
3rd place, bronze medalist(s)	Anna Ber	Russia	38.72
4	Grace Fernandez Castillo	Colombia	39.00
5	Jan Ye-sol	South Korea	39.02
6	Xu Yichuan	China	39.36
7	Kim Ga-in	South Korea	39.65
8	Csilla Karolyi	Hungary	39.87
