= Aerobic gymnastics at the 2017 World Games – Open event dance =

Open event dance aerobic gymnastics at the World Games
- Venue: Centennial Hall, Wrocław, Poland
- Date: 21 July 2017
- Competitors: 48 from 6 nations
- Winning total: 18.825 points

Medalists
| 1st place, gold medalist(s) | | Han Jae Hyun (한재현); Kim Hanjin (김한진); Kim Yu Hwan (김유환); Kwon Tae Yun (권태윤); Lee Jon Gu (이준규); Park Hyunmin (박현민); Ryu Jusun (류주선); Song Sungkyu (송성규) | South Korea |
| 2nd place, silver medalist(s) | | Danil Chaiun; Garsevan Dzhanazian; Kirill Kulikov; Kirill Lobaznyuk; Roman Semenov; Anton Shishigin; Denis Shurupov; Aleksei Zhuravlev | Russia |
| 3rd place, bronze medalist(s) | | Dora Hegyi; Zoltan Lőcsei; Panna Szőllősi; Emese Timea Szaloki; Balazs Albert Farkas; Anna Deak; Fanni Mazacs; Klaudia Bokonyi | Hungary |

The open event dance competition at the 2017 World Games in Wrocław was played on 21 July. 12 Aerobic gymnastics competitors, from 6 nations, participated in the tournament. The Aerobic gymnastics competition took place at Centennial Hall in Lower Silesian Voivodeship.

== Competition format ==
The top 4 teams in qualifications, advanced to the final. The scores in qualification do not count in the final.

== Qualification ==
| Team | Artistic | Execution | Total | |
| Team | Score | Score | Score | Rank |
|---|---|---|---|---|
| South Korea | 9.475 | 9.000 | 18.475 | 1 |
| Russia | 9.200 | 9.150 | 18.350 | 2 |
| Hungary | 9.300 | 8.950 | 18.250 | 3 |
| China | 9.175 | 9.050 | 18.225 | 4 |
| Romania | 9.200 | 8.900 | 18.100 | 5 |
| Brazil | 8.750 | 8.500 | 17.250 | 6 |

== Final ==
| Rank | Team | Artistic | Execution | Total |
| Rank | Team | Score | Score | Score |
|---|---|---|---|---|
| 1st place, gold medalist(s) | South Korea | 9.525 | 9.300 | 18.825 |
| 2nd place, silver medalist(s) | Russia | 9.200 | 9.350 | 18.550 |
| 3rd place, bronze medalist(s) | Hungary | 9.350 | 9.050 | 18.400 |
| 4 | China | 9.250 | 9.100 | 18.350 |

== Final standing ==
| Rank | Team |
|---|---|
| 1st place, gold medalist(s) | South Korea |
| 2nd place, silver medalist(s) | Russia |
| 3rd place, bronze medalist(s) | Hungary |
| 4 | China |
| 5 | Romania |
| 6 | Brazil |

== Medalists ==
| Event | Gold | Silver | Bronze |
|---|---|---|---|
| Open event dance | South Korea; Han Jae Hyun; Kim Hanjin; Kim Yu Hwan; Kwon Tae Yun; Lee Jon Gu; Park Hyunmin; Ryu Jusun; Song Sungkyu | Russia; Danil Chaiun; Garsevan Dzhanazian; Kirill Kulikov; Kirill Lobaznyuk; Roman Semenov; Anton Shishigin; Denis Shurupov; Aleksei Zhuravlev | Hungary; Dora Hegyi; Zoltan Lőcsei; Panna Szőllősi; Emese Timea Szaloki; Balazs Albert Farkas; Anna Deak; Fanni Mazacs; Klaudia Bokonyi |
