= Ju-jitsu at the 2017 World Games – Men's ne-waza 94 kg =

Men's ne-waza 94 kg at the 2017 World Games
- Venue: GEM Sports Complex
- Date: 28 July 2017
- Competitors: 6 from 6 nations

Medalists
1st place, gold medalist(s)		(United Arab Emirates) Faisal Al-Ketbi
2nd place, silver medalist(s)		(Hungary) Kristóf Szűcs
3rd place, bronze medalist(s)		(Belgium) Florent Minguet

The men's ne-waza 94 kg competition in ju-jitsu at the 2017 World Games took place on 28 July 2017 at the GEM Sports Complex in Wrocław, Poland.

== Results ==
=== Elimination round ===
==== Group A ====
Rank	Athlete	B	W	L	Pts	Score
1	Kristóf Szűcs (HUN)	2	2	0	100–0	+100
2	Faisal Al-Ketbi (UAE)	2	1	1	4–0	+4
3	Mohsen Hamid Aghchay (IRI)	2	0	2	0–104	–104

	Score	
Faisal Al-Ketbi (UAE)	0–0	Kristóf Szűcs (HUN)
Faisal Al-Ketbi (UAE)	4–0	Mohsen Hamid Aghchay (IRI)
Kristóf Szűcs (HUN)	100–0	Mohsen Hamid Aghchay (IRI)

==== Group B ====
Rank	Athlete	B	W	L	Pts	Score
1	Max Hederström (SWE)	2	2	0	103–0	+103
2	Florent Minguet (BEL)	2	1	1	5–5	0
3	Malte Meinken (GER)	2	0	2	2–105	–103

	Score	
Florent Minguet (BEL)	5–2	Malte Meinken (GER)
Florent Minguet (BEL)	0–3	Max Hederström (SWE)
Malte Meinken (GER)	0–100	Max Hederström (SWE)

=== Finals ===
Semifinals
Kristóf Szűcs (HUN)	7
Florent Minguet (BEL)	0
Max Hederström (SWE)	2
Faisal Al-Ketbi (UAE)	2

Final
Kristóf Szűcs (HUN)	0
Faisal Al-Ketbi (UAE)	2
Third place
Florent Minguet (BEL)	4
Max Hederström (SWE)	0
