= Angelina Sandovich =

Belarusian acrobatic gymnast

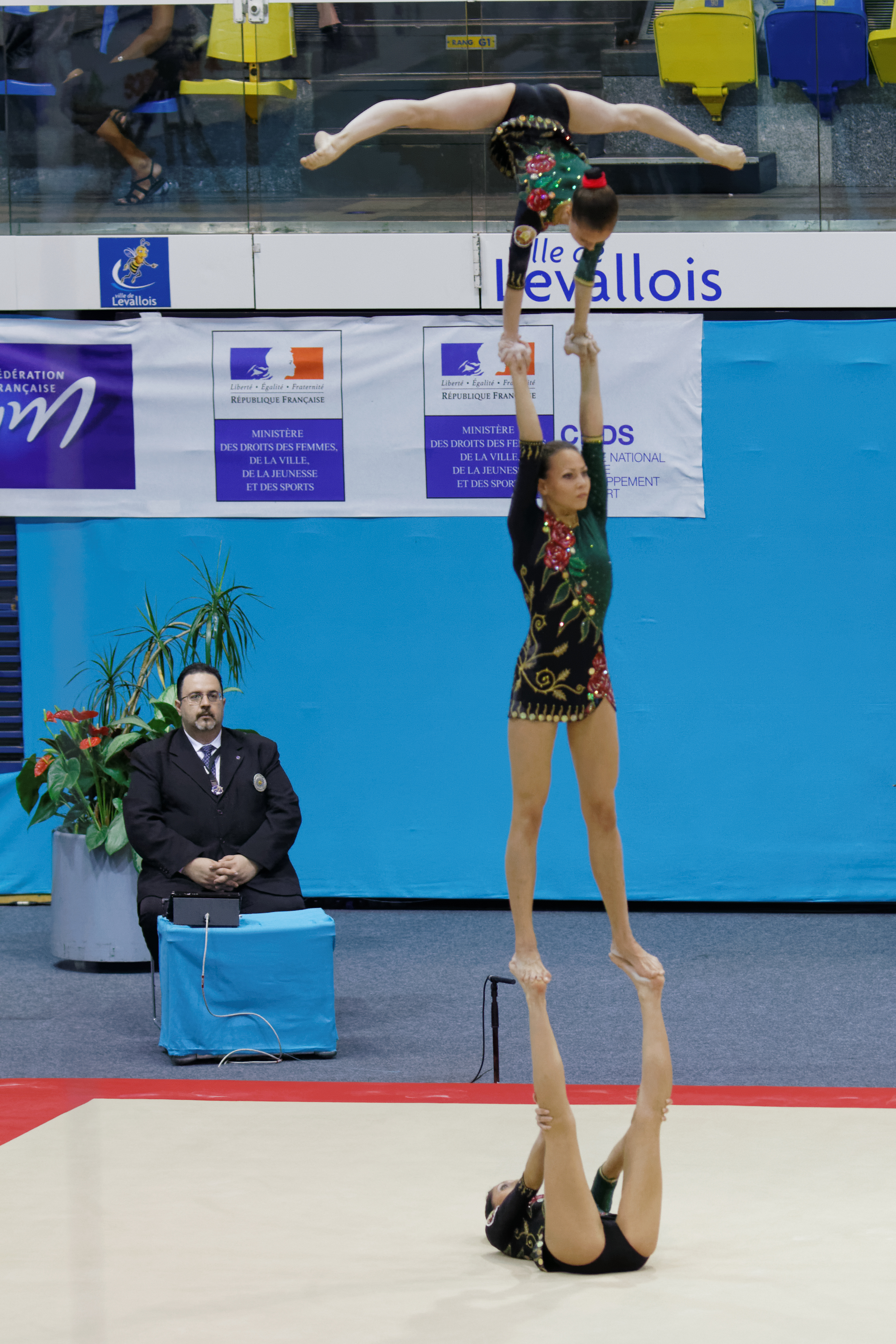

Personal information
- Born: 11 September 1999 (age 26)

Gymnastics career
- Discipline: Acrobatic gymnastics
- Country represented: Belarus

Angelina Sandovich (Belarusian: Ангеліна Сандовіч, born 11 September 1999) is a Belarusian female acrobatic gymnast. With partners Julia Kovalenko and Yuliya Ramanenka, Sandovich achieved 5th in the 2014 Acrobatic Gymnastics World Championships.
