= Yuliya Ramanenka =

Belarusian acrobatic gymnast

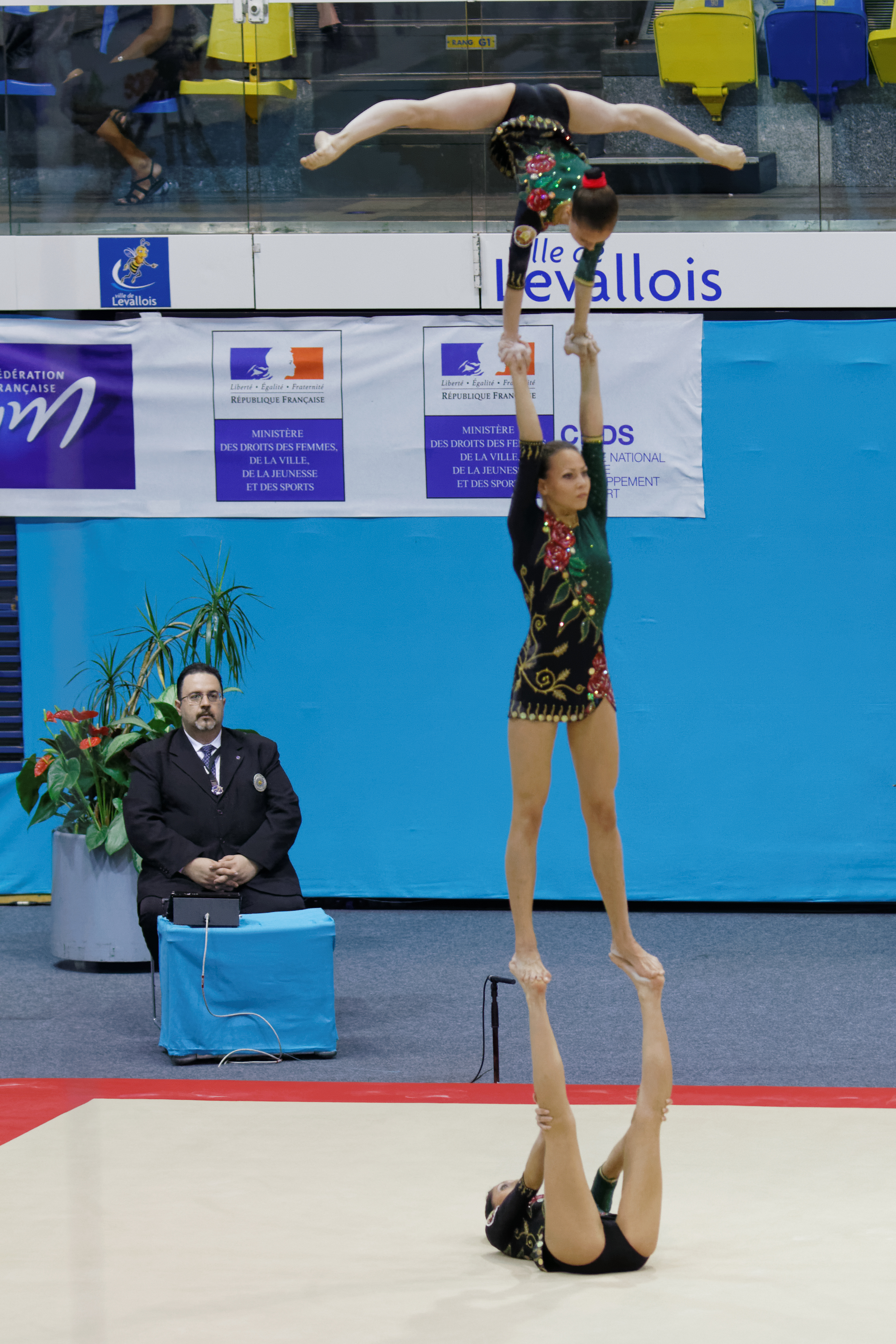

Personal information
- Alternative name: Romanenko
- Born: 12 June 1989 (age 37)

Gymnastics career
- Discipline: Acrobatic gymnastics
- Country represented: Belarus

Yuliya Ramanenka née Khrypach (Belarusian: Юлія Раманенка; born 12 June 1989) is a Belarusian female acrobatic gymnast. With partners Julia Kovalenko and Angelina Sandovich, Ramanenka achieved 5th in the 2014 Acrobatic Gymnastics World Championships.
