= Aerobic gymnastics at the 2017 World Games – Mixed pairs =

Mixed pairs aerobic gymnastics at the World Games
- Venue: Centennial Hall, Wrocław, Poland
- Date: 21 July 2017
- Competitors: 12 from 6 nations
- Winning total: 22.550 points

Medalists
1st place, gold medalist(s)		Vicente Lli; Sara Moreno	Spain
2nd place, silver medalist(s)		Dora Hegyi; Daniel Bali	Hungary
3rd place, bronze medalist(s)		Andreea Bogati; Dacian Barna	Romania

The mixed pairs competition at the 2017 World Games in Wrocław was played on 21 July. 12 Aerobic gymnastics competitors, from 6 nations, participated in the tournament. The Aerobic gymnastics competition took place at Centennial Hall in Lower Silesian Voivodeship.

== Competition format ==
The top 4 teams in qualifications, advanced to the final. The scores in qualification do not count in the final.

== Qualification ==
Team	Artistic	Execution	Difficulty	Lift	Total	
Team	Score	Score	Score	Score	Score	Rank
Spain	9.500	8.650	3.300	1.000	22.450	1
Hungary	9.300	8.500	3.200	1.000	22.000	2
Romania	9.050	8.350	3.250	1.000	21.650	3
Japan	9.000	8.500	3.050	0.900	21.450	4
Russia	9.050	8.300	2.900	0.800	21.050	5
Italy	9.100	8.250	2.600	0.900	20.850	6

== Final ==
Rank	Team	Artistic	Execution	Difficulty	Lift	Total
Rank	Team	Score	Score	Score	Score	Score
1st place, gold medalist(s)	Spain	9.550	8.800	3.300	0.900	22.550
2nd place, silver medalist(s)	Hungary	9.250	8.600	3.300	0.700	21.850
3rd place, bronze medalist(s)	Romania	9.050	8.450	3.200	1.000	21.700
4	Japan	9.000	8.350	2.900	0.800	21.050

== Final standing ==
Rank	Team
1st place, gold medalist(s)	Spain
2nd place, silver medalist(s)	Hungary
3rd place, bronze medalist(s)	Romania
4	Japan
5	Russia
6	Italy

== Medalists ==
Event	Gold	Silver	Bronze
Mixed pairs	Spain; Vicente Lli; Sara Moreno	Hungary; Dora Hegyi; Daniel Bali	Romania; Andreea Bogati; Dacian Barna
