= 2018 Acrobatic Gymnastics World Championships =

26th Acrobatic Gymnastics World Championships
- Venue: Lotto Arena
- Location: Antwerp, Belgium
- Start date: 13 April 2018
- End date: 15 April 2018

The 2018 Acrobatic Gymnastics World Championships was the 26th edition of acrobatic gymnastics competition and took place in Lotto Arena, Antwerp, Belgium from 13-15 April 2018.

== Medal summary ==
=== Medal table ===
Rank	Nation	Gold	Silver	Bronze	Total
1	Russia (RUS)	5	0	1	6
2	Israel (ISR)	1	1	1	3
3	Belarus (BLR)	0	2	1	3
4	North Korea (PRK)	0	2	0	2
5	China (CHN)	0	1	1	2
6	Belgium (BEL)	0	0	1	1
6	United Kingdom	0	0	1	1
Totals (7 entries)		6	6	6	18

=== Results ===
Event	Gold	Silver	Bronze
Team	Russia; Marina Chernova; Georgii Pataraia; Daria Chebulanka; Polina Plastinina; Kseniia Zagoskina; Daria Guryeva; Daria Kalinina	Israel; Lidar Dana; Yannay Kalfa; Efi Efraim Sach; Daniel Uralevitch; Or Armony; Tzlil Hurvitz; Yuval Weingold; Mika Lefkovits; Roni Surzon	Belarus; Artsiom Yashchanka; Aliaksei Zayats; Julia Ivonchyk; Veranika Nabokina; Karina Sandovich; Volha Melnik; Artur Beliakou
Men's Pair	Russia; Igor Mishev; Nikolay Suprunov	North Korea; Ri Hyo-song; Kong Yong-won	United Kingdom; Charlie Tate; Adam Upcott
Women's Pair	Russia; Daria Guryeva; Daria Kalinina	North Korea; Jong Kum-hwa; Pyon Yun-ae	Israel; Mika Lefkovits; Roni Surzon
Mixed Pair	Russia; Marina Chernova; Georgii Pataraia	Belarus; Hanna Kasyan; Konstantin Evstafeev	Belgium; Marte Snoeck; Bram Röttger
Women's Group	Russia; Daria Chebulanka; Polina Plastinina; Kseniia Zagoskina	Belarus; Julia Ivonchyk; Veranika Nabokina; Karina Sandovich	China; Duan Yushan; Ji Qiuqiong; Liu Jieyu
Men's Group	Israel; Lidar Dana; Yannay Kalfa; Efi Efraim Sach; Daniel Uralevitch	China; Fu Zhi; Guo Pei; Jiang Heng; Zhang Junshuo	Russia; German Kudriashov; Alexander Sorokin; Valeriy Tukhashvili; Kirill Zadorin
