= Acrobatic gymnastics at the 2017 World Games – Women's pairs all-around =

Women's pairs all-around at the World Games
- Venue: Centennial Hall, Wrocław, Poland
- Date: 24 July 2017
- Competitors: 12 from 6 nations
- Winning total: 29.870 points

Medalists
1st place, gold medalist(s)		Daria Guryeva; Daria Kalinina	Russia
2nd place, silver medalist(s)		Lore Vanden Berghe; Noémie Lammertyn	Belgium
3rd place, bronze medalist(s)		Veronika Habelok; Irina Nazimova	Ukraine

The women's pairs all-around competition at the 2017 World Games in Wrocław was played on 24 July. 12 acrobatic gymnastics competitors, from 6 nations, participated in the tournaWoment. The acrobatic gymnastics competition took place at Centennial Hall in Lower Silesian Voivodeship.

== Competition format ==
The top 4 teams in qualifications, based on combined scores of each round, advanced to the final. The scores in qualification do not count in the final.

== Qualification ==
Team	Balance		Dynamic		Total (All-around)	
Team	Score	Rank	Score	Rank	Score	Rank
Russia	29.750	1	29.150	1	58.900	1
Belgium	29.550	3	28.080	2	57.630	2
United States	27.590	2	26.760	5	54.350	3
Ukraine	26.110	4	27.250	3	53.360	4
China	25.850	5	26.820	4	52.670	5
Netherlands	24.650	6	25.830	6	50.480	6

== Final ==
Rank	Team	Difficulty	Artistry	Execution	Penalty	Total (All-around)
Rank	Team	Score	Score	Score	Score	Score
1st place, gold medalist(s)	Russia	2.270	9.200	18.400	-0.000	29.870
2nd place, silver medalist(s)	Belgium	2.060	9.150	17.300	-0.000	28.510
3rd place, bronze medalist(s)	Ukraine	1.580	8.650	17.700	-0.000	27.930
4	United States	1.610	8.350	14.800	-0.900	23.860

== Final standing ==
Rank	Team
1st place, gold medalist(s)	Russia
2nd place, silver medalist(s)	Belgium
3rd place, bronze medalist(s)	Ukraine
4	United States
5	China
6	Netherlands

== Medalists ==
Event	Gold	Silver	Bronze
Pairs all-around	Russia; Daria Guryeva; Daria Kalinina	Belgium; Lore Vanden Berghe; Noémie Lammertyn	Ukraine; Veronika Habelok; Irina Nazimova

== See also ==
- Acrobatic gymnastics at the 2017 World Games – Women's group all-around
- Acrobatic gymnastics at the 2017 World Games – Men's pairs all-around
- Acrobatic gymnastics at the 2017 World Games – Mixed pairs all-around
