= Julia Ivonchyk =

Belarusian acrobatic gymnast

Julia Ivonchyk (Kovalenko)
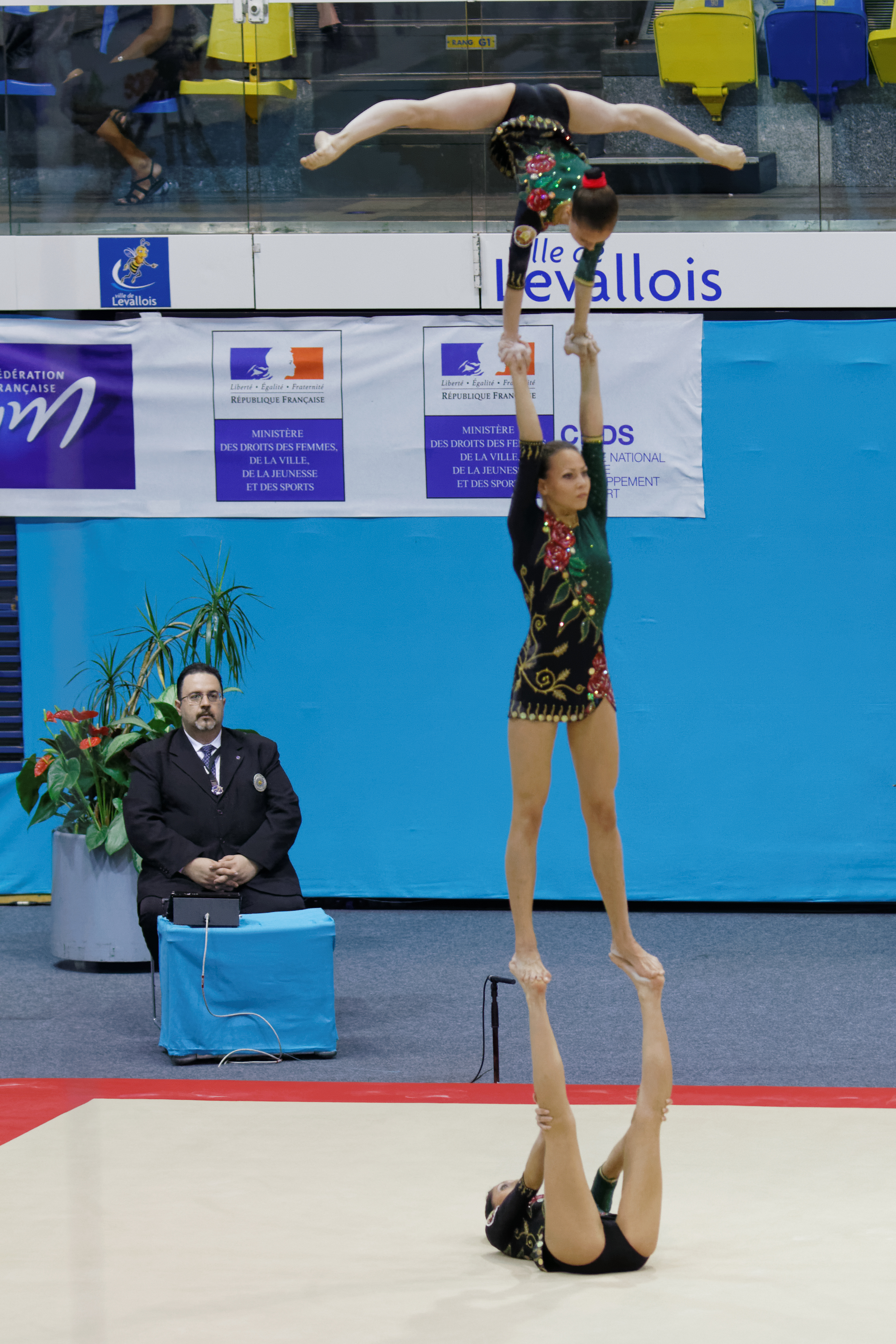

Personal information
- Born: 27 July 1994 (age 32)

Gymnastics career
- Discipline: Acrobatic gymnastics
- Country represented: Belarus
Medal record
Women's acrobatic gymnastics
Representing Belarus
World Games
Silver medal – second place	2017 Wroclaw	Group all-around
Bronze medal – third place	2013 Cali	Group
European Games
Gold medal – first place	2019 Minsk	Group balance
Bronze medal – third place	2019 Minsk	Group dynamic
Bronze medal – third place	2019 Minsk	Group all-around
World Championships
Bronze medal – third place	2018 Antwerp	Team
European Championships
Bronze medal – third place	2017 Rzeszów	Group all-around
Bronze medal – third place	2017 Rzeszów	Group balance
Bronze medal – third place	2017 Rzeszów	Group dynamic

Julia Ivonchyk (née Kovalenko, Belarusian: Юлія Каваленка, born 27 July 1994) is a Belarusian female acrobatic gymnast. With partners Angelina Sandovich and Yuliya Ramanenka, Kovalenko achieved 5th in the 2014 Acrobatic Gymnastics World Championships.

At the 2013 World Games, she won a bronze medal in the group event.

At the 2017 World Games, she won a silver medal in the women's group all-around event.

At the 2017 Acrobatic Gymnastics European Championships, she won bronze medals in three women's group events: all-around, balance, and dynamic.

At the 2018 Acrobatic Gymnastics World Championships, she won a bronze medal in the team event.
