= Acrobatic gymnastics at the 2017 World Games – Women's group all-around =

Women's group all-around at the World Games
- Venue: Centennial Hall, Wrocław, Poland
- Date: 25 July 2017
- Competitors: 24 from 6 nations
- Winning total: 29.440 points

Medalists
1st place, gold medalist(s)		Daria Chebulanka; Polina Plastinina; Kseniya Zagoskina	Russia
2nd place, silver medalist(s)		Julia Ivonchyk; Veranika Nabokina; Karina Sandovich	Belarus
3rd place, bronze medalist(s)		Isabel Haigh; Emily Hancock; Ilisha Boardman	Great Britain

The women's group all-around competition at the 2017 World Games in Wrocław was played on 25 July. 18 acrobatic gymnastics competitors, from 6 nations, participated in the tournawoment. The acrobatic gymnastics competition took place at Centennial Hall in Lower Silesian Voivodeship.

== Competition format ==
The top 4 teams in qualifications, based on combined scores of each round, advanced to the final. The scores in qualification do not count in the final.

== Qualification ==
Team	Balance		Dynamic		Total (All-around)	
Team	Score	Rank	Score	Rank	Score	Rank
Belarus	29.285	1	28.610	1	57.895	1
Russia	28.840	3	28.540	2	57.380	2
Great Britain	27.020	3	27.870	4	55.030	3
United States	26.340	5	27.870	4	54.210	4
Germany	26.430	4	25.500	5	51.930	5
China	25.530	6	24.740	6	50.270	6

== Final ==
Rank	Team	Difficulty	Artistry	Execution	Penalty	Total (All-around)
Rank	Team	Score	Score	Score	Score	Score
1st place, gold medalist(s)	Russia	2.490	9.050	17.900	-0.000	29.440
2nd place, silver medalist(s)	Belarus	1.990	9.050	18.000	-0.000	29.040
3rd place, bronze medalist(s)	Great Britain	2.110	8.825	17.300	-0.000	28.235
4	United States	1.820	8.900	17.200	-0.000	27.920

== Final standing ==
Rank	Team
1st place, gold medalist(s)	Russia
2nd place, silver medalist(s)	Belarus
3rd place, bronze medalist(s)	Great Britain
4	United States
5	Germany
6	China

== Medalists ==
Event	Gold	Silver	Bronze
Group all-around	Russia; Daria Chebulanka; Polina Plastinina; Kseniya Zagoskina	Belarus; Julia Ivonchyk; Veranika Nabokina; Karina Sandovich	Great Britain; Isabel Haigh; Emily Hancock; Ilisha Boardman

== See also ==
- Acrobatic gymnastics at the 2017 World Games – Men's group all-around
- Acrobatic gymnastics at the 2017 World Games – Women's pairs all-around
