= Aerobic gymnastics at the 2017 World Games – Open event group =

Open event group aerobic gymnastics at the World Games
- Venue: Centennial Hall, Wrocław, Poland
- Date: 22 July 2017
- Competitors: 30 from 6 nations
- Winning total: 22.683 points

Medalists
1st place, gold medalist(s)		Li Lingxiao; Li Qi; Ma Dong; Pan Lixi; Wang Ke	China
2nd place, silver medalist(s)		Gabriel Bocser; Andreea Bogati; Lucian Săvulescu; Dacian Barna; Marian Brotei	Romania
3rd place, bronze medalist(s)		Dora Hegyi; Daniel Bali; Panna Szőllősi Balazs; Albert Farkas; Fanni Mazacs	Hungary

The open event group competition at the 2017 World Games in Wrocław was played on 22 July. 30 Aerobic gymnastics competitors, from 6 nations, participated in the tournament. The Aerobic gymnastics competition took place at Centennial Hall in Lower Silesian Voivodeship.

== Competition format ==
The top 4 teams in qualifications, advanced to the final. The scores in qualification do not count in the final.

== Qualification ==
Team	Artistic	Execution	Difficulty	Lift	Total	
Team	Score	Score	Score	Score	Score	Rank
Romania	9.150	8.550	3.500	1.000	22.200	1
China	9.000	8.350	3.333	1.000	21.683	2
Hungary	9.275	8.500	2.888	1.000	21.663	3
Russia	8.950	8.050	2.333	1.000	20.333	4
Italy	8.500	7.700	2.555	0.600	19.355	5
France	8.450	7.600	1.777	0.800	18.627	6

== Final ==
Rank	Team	Artistic	Execution	Difficulty	Lift	Total
Rank	Team	Score	Score	Score	Score	Score
1st place, gold medalist(s)	China	9.250	8.600	3.833	1.000	22.683
2nd place, silver medalist(s)	Romania	9.100	8.650	3.555	1.000	22.305
3rd place, bronze medalist(s)	Hungary	9.300	8.500	3.444	1.000	22.244
4	Russia	9.000	8.100	3.222	1.000	21.322

== Final standing ==
Rank	Team
1st place, gold medalist(s)	China
2nd place, silver medalist(s)	Romania
3rd place, bronze medalist(s)	Hungary
4	Russia
5	Italy
6	France

== Medalists ==
Event	Gold	Silver	Bronze
Open event group	China; Li Lingxiao; Li Qi; Ma Dong; Pan Lixi; Wang Ke	Romania; Gabriel Bocser; Andreea Bogati; Lucian Săvulescu; Dacian Barna; Marian Brotei	Hungary; Dora Hegyi; Daniel Bali; Panna Szőllősi Balazs; Albert Farkas; Fanni Mazacs
