= Aliona Dubinina =

Belarusian gymnast

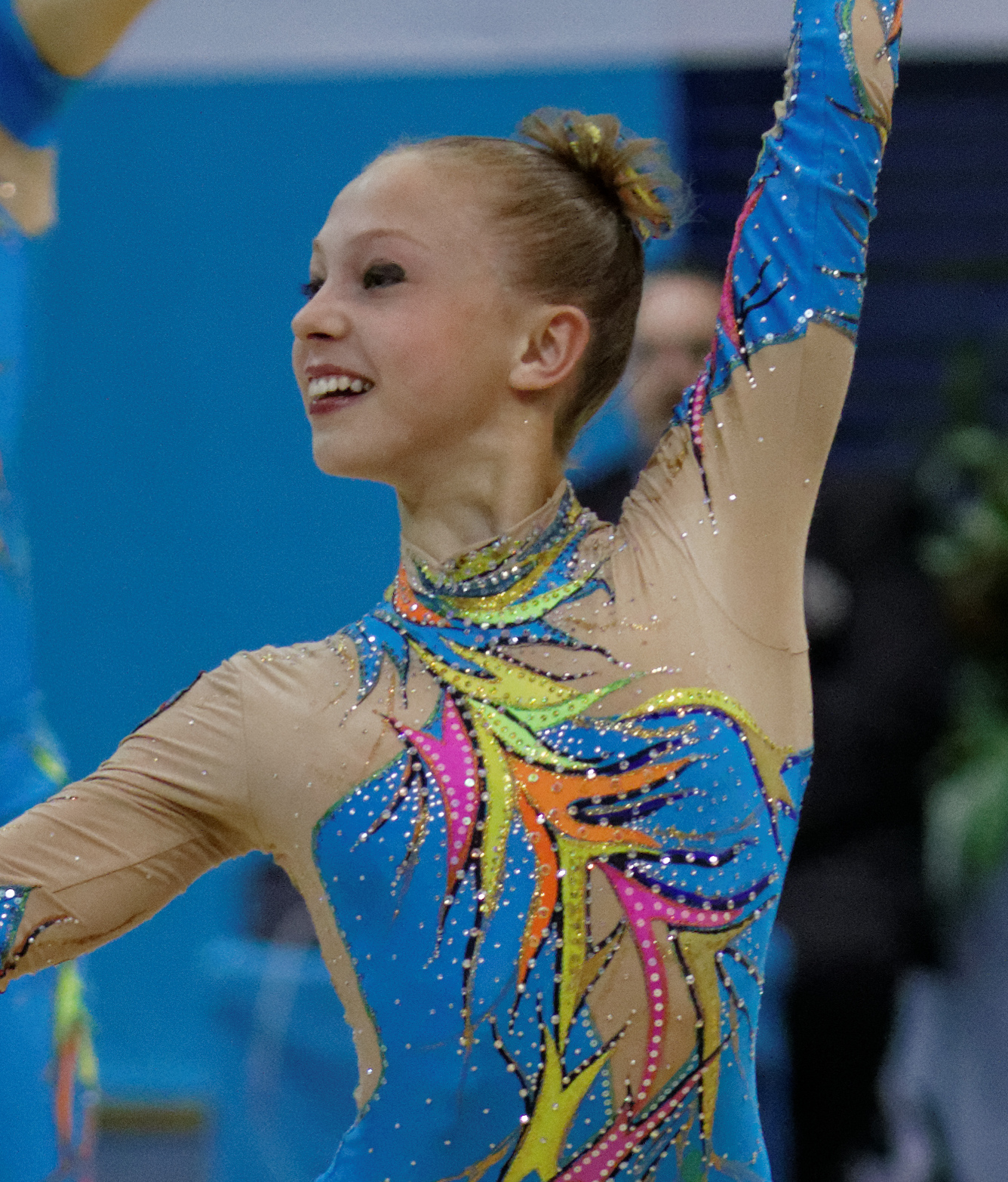
- Aliona Dubinina at the 2014 Acrobatic Gymnastics World Championships.

Personal information
- Born: 22 September 1999 (age 26)

Gymnastics career
- Discipline: Acrobatic gymnastics
- Country represented: Belarus

Aliona Dubinina (Belarusian: Алена Дубініна, born 22 September 1999) is a Belarusian acrobatic gymnast. With Artur Beliakou, she competed in the 2014 Acrobatic Gymnastics World Championships.

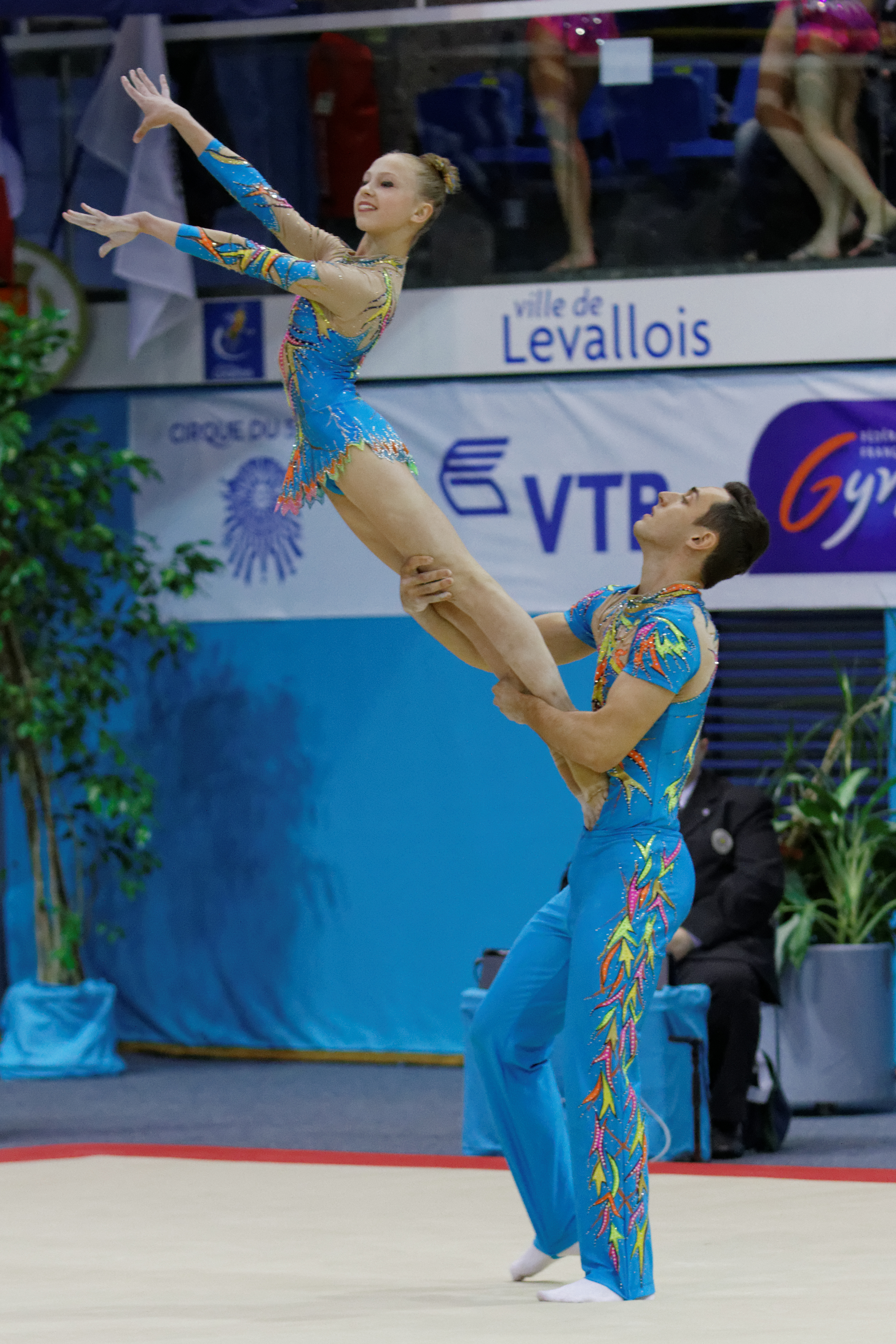
Aliona Dubinina and Artur Beliakou at the 2014 Acrobatic Gymnastics World Championships.
