= Jong Kum-hwa =

North Korean acrobatic gymnast (born 1993)

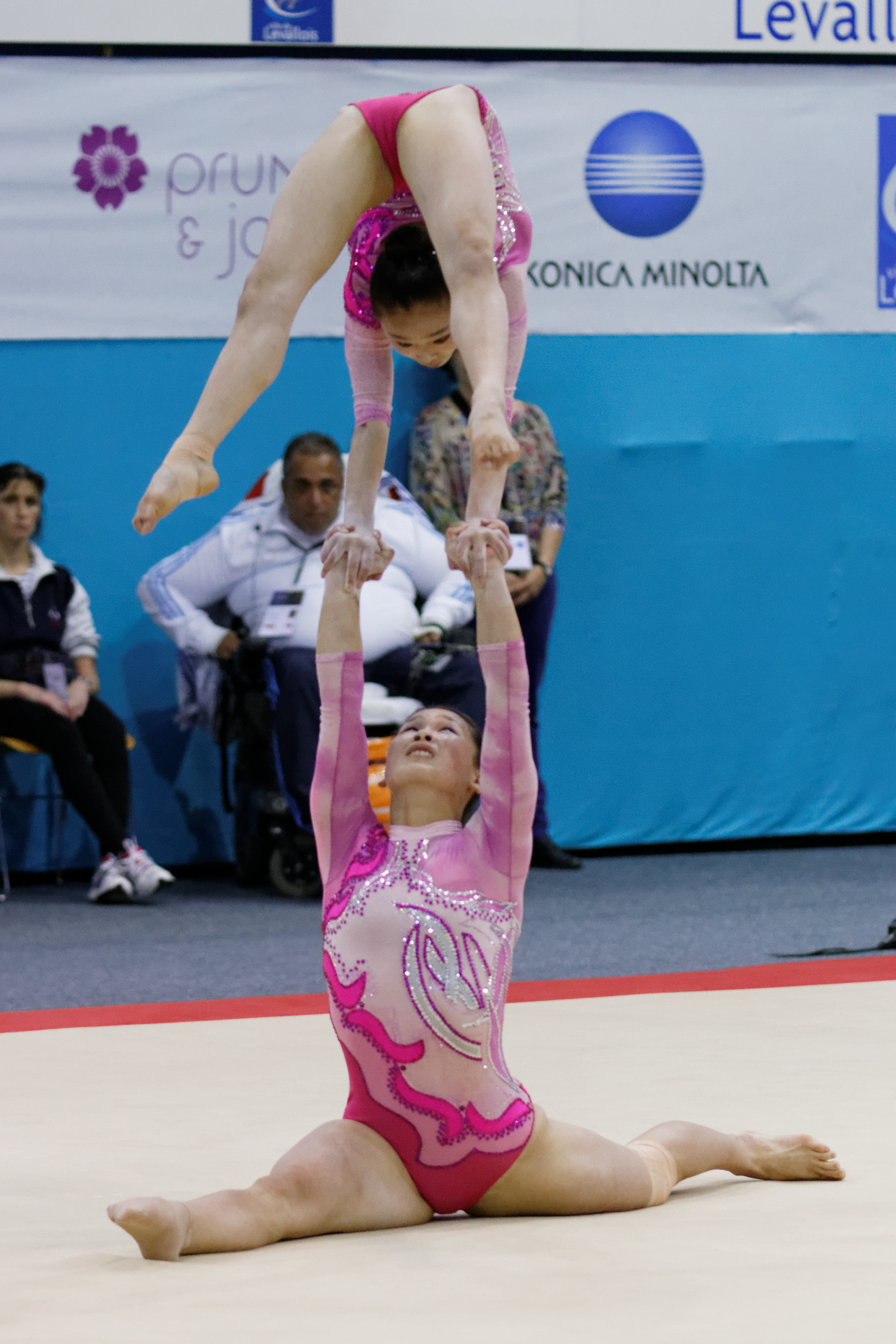
- Kim Hye-song and Jong Kum-hwa (bottom)

Personal information
- Born: February 23, 1993 (age 33)

Gymnastics career
- Discipline: Acrobatic gymnastics
- Country represented: North Korea
Medal record
Women's acrobatic gymnastics
Representing North Korea
World Championships
Silver medal – second place	2018 Antwerp	Women's Pairs

Korean name
- Hangul: 정금화
- RR: Jeong Geumhwa
- MR: Chŏng Kŭmhwa

Jong Kum-hwa (Korean: 정금화; born February 23, 1993) is a North Korean female acrobatic gymnast. With partner Kim Hye-song, Jong achieved 5th in the 2014 Acrobatic Gymnastics World Championships. With partner Pyon Yun-ae, Jong achieved 2nd in the 2018 Acrobatic Gymnastics World Championships. She started gymnastics in 2008.
