= Marina Chernova =

Russian acrobatic gymnast

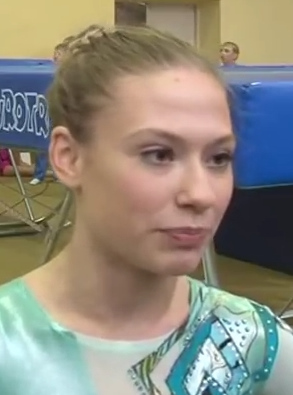
- Chernova in 2012

Personal information
- Born: 7 March 1996 (age 30)

Gymnastics career
- Discipline: Acrobatic gymnastics
- Country represented: Russia
Medal record
Acrobatic gymnastics
Representing Russia
World Championships
Gold medal – first place	2014 Levallois-Perret	Mixed pair
Gold medal – first place	2016 Putian	Mixed pair
Gold medal – first place	2018 Antwerp	Mixed pair
Gold medal – first place	2018 Antwerp	Team
World Games
Gold medal – first place	2017 Wroclaw	Mixed pair all-around
European Games
Gold medal – first place	2015 Baku	Mixed pair all-around
Gold medal – first place	2015 Baku	Mixed pair balance
Gold medal – first place	2015 Baku	Mixed pair dynamic

Marina Olegovna Chernova (Russian: Марина Олеговна Чернова; born 7 March 1996) is a Russian female acrobatic gymnast. With her partner, Revaz Gurgenidze, Chernova came 1st in the 2014 Acrobatic Gymnastics World Championships. With her partner Georgii Pataraia, Chernova came 1st at the 2016 and 2018 Acrobatic Gymnastics World Championships.
