= Alexey Rubtsov =

Russian rock climber

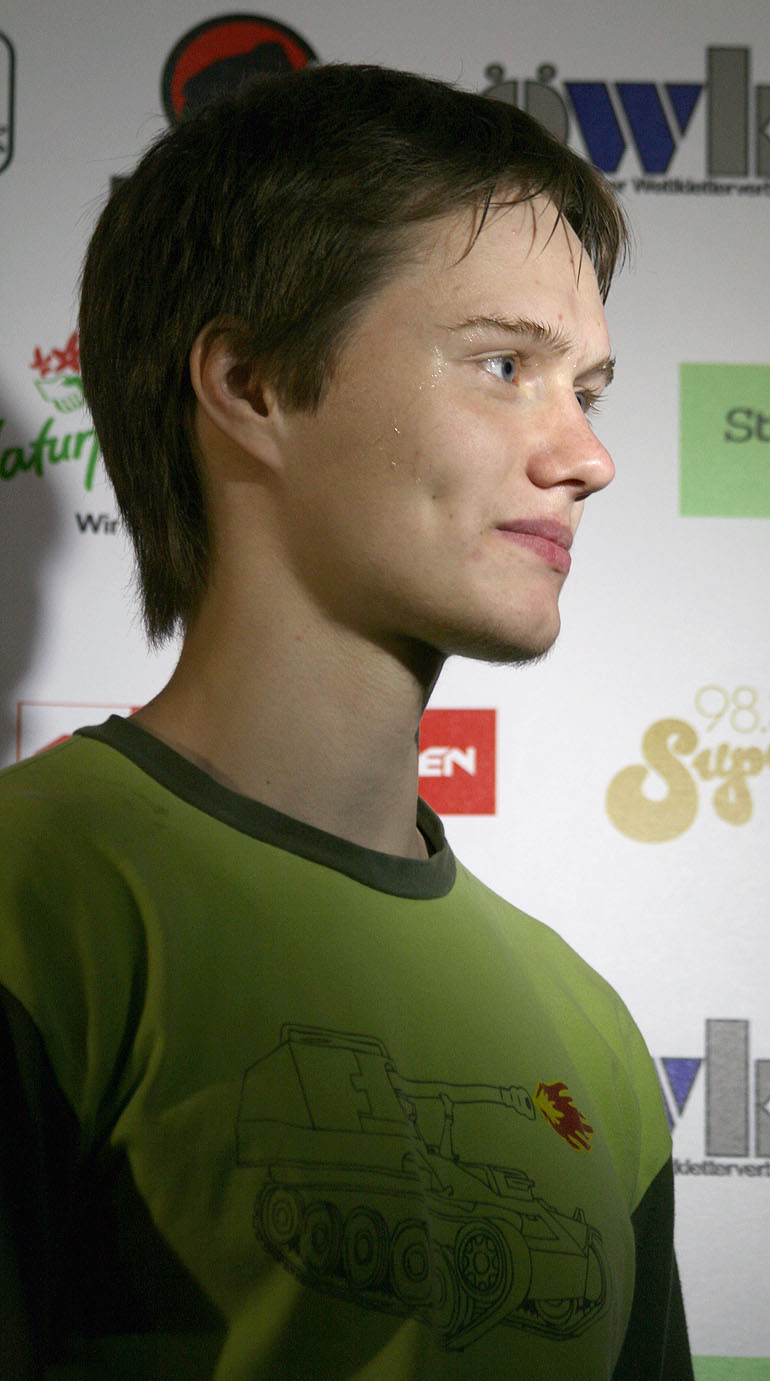
- Rubtsov in the World Cup bouldering competition in Vienna, Austria (2010)

Personal information
- Nationality: Russian
- Born: August 5, 1988 (age 38) Moscow, RSFSR, Soviet Union
- Height: 178 cm (5 ft 10 in)
- Weight: 63 kg (139 lb)

Climbing career
- Type of climber: Competition climbing; Bouldering
Medal record
Men's competition climbing
Representing Russia
Event	1st	2nd	3rd
World Championship	1	–	–
European Championship	1	–	–
Climbing World Cup
Bronze medal – third place	2017	Bouldering
Bronze medal – third place	2016	Bouldering
World Games
Bronze medal – third place	2017 Wrocław	Boulder
IFSC World Championships
Gold medal – first place	2009 Xining	Bouldering
IFSC European Championships
Gold medal – first place	2020 Moscow	Combined
- Updated on 9 April 2013

Alexey Vyacheslavovich Rubtsov (Russian: Алексей Вячеславович Рубцов; born 5 August 1988) is a Russian professional rock climber who specializes in competition bouldering. He has won the IFSC Climbing World Championships in the bouldering discipline in 2009. He won the 9th edition of the Melloblocco competition in 2012. At the 2020 IFSC Climbing European Championships he won the combined event, ensuring him a place at the 2020 Summer Olympics.

He ranked third at the 2017 World Games in Wrocław, Poland in the men's boulder event.

== Biography ==
In 2006 and 2007, Alexey Rubtsov started climbing in the Russian competition climbing championships. In 2008, he entered two stages of the bouldering World Cup. In 2009, he participated in the bouldering World Championships again and won over Rustam Gelmanov and David Barrans. Over the next two years, he participated in several stages of the bouldering World Cup, finishing third in Sheffield and Munich in 2011.

In May 2012, he participated in the 9th edition of Melloblocco, a block outside competition, which takes place in Val Masino in Italy. Against 2200 other participants, he tied for the win with Michele Caminati and Anthony Gullsten. Shauna Coxsey won the women's competition that year.

Alexey Rubtsov opened and manages his own bouldering gym in the North of Moscow, called Tokio.
