= Ethiopia at the 2017 World Games =

Ethiopia at the World Games 2017
- IOC code: ETH
- NOC: Ethiopian Olympic Committee
- Website: www.ethiolympic.org

in Wrocław, Poland 20 July 2017 – 30 July 2017
- Competitors: 1 in 1 sport
- Medals: Gold 0 Silver 0 Bronze 0 Total 0

World Games appearances
- 1981; 1985; 1989; 1993; 1997; 2001; 2005; 2009; 2013; 2017; 2022; 2025

Ethiopia competed at the 2017 World Games in Wrocław, Poland, from 20 July to 30 July 2017. The country did not win any medal in the multi-sport event.

== Competitors ==
Sports	Men	Women	Total	Events
Jujitsu	1	0	1	1
Total	1	0	1	1

== Jujitsu ==
Ethiopia qualified one athlete for the multi-sport event.

Yared Nigussen in the men's 64 kg Ne Waza
