= Empty Netters =

American sports podcast

- Genre: Ice hockey, comedy
- Language: English

Cast and voices
- Hosted by: Dan Powers; Chris Powers; Nate Thompson

Publication
- Original release: 2022
- Provider: Almost Friday Media
- Updates: Tuesdays

Empty Netters is an ice hockey podcast hosted by brothers Dan Powers and Chris Powers. Produced by the Almost Friday Media network, the show features interviews with hockey personalities, analysis of the National Hockey League (NHL), and discussions regarding pop culture. The podcast received media coverage in 2023 following the hosts' involvement in Frank Ocean's cancelled ice skating performance at Coachella, and in 2025 for its commentary on the queer romance television series Heated Rivalry.

== History ==
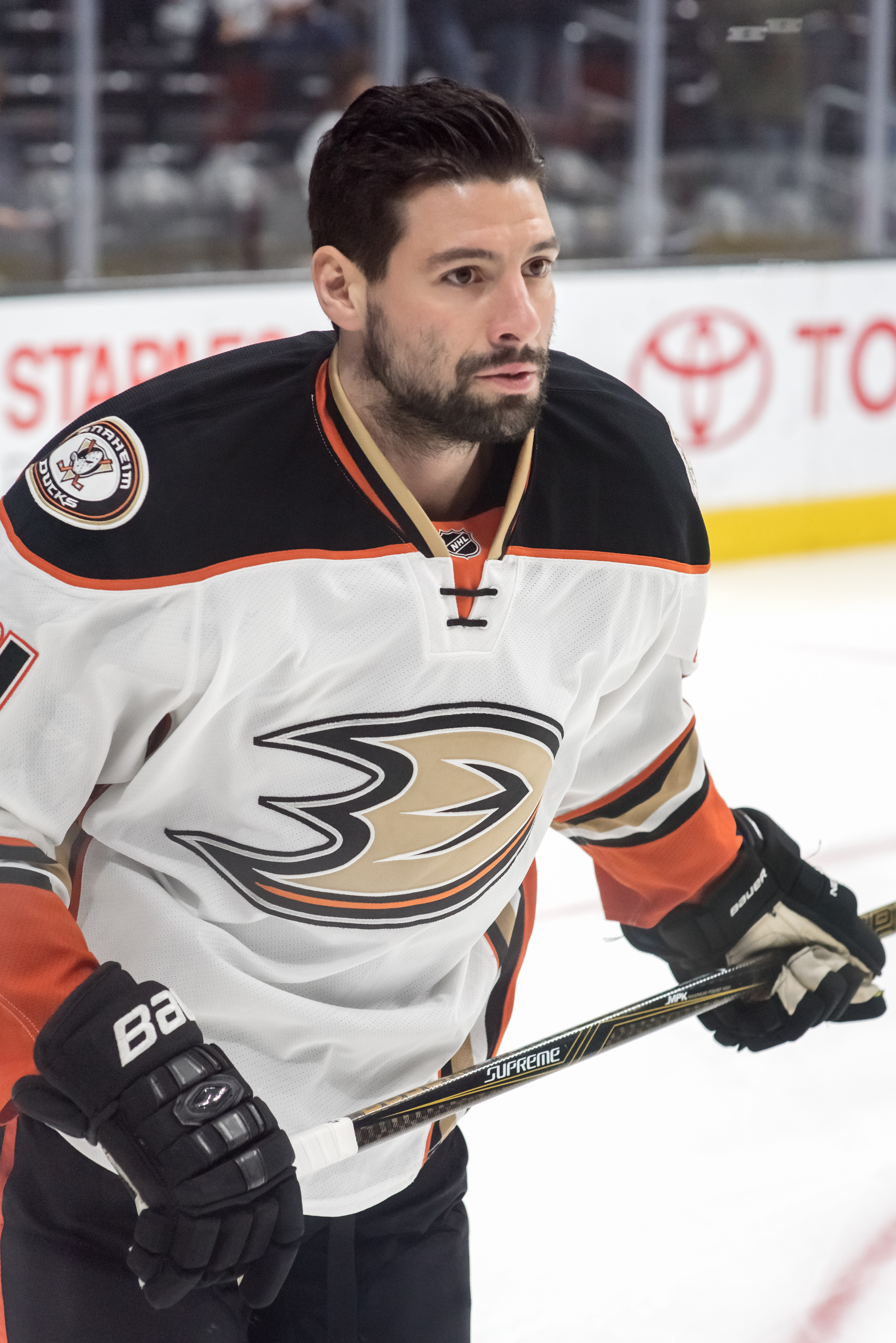
Co-host Nate Thompson

The podcast started in 2022, initially focusing on interviews and ice hockey analysis. It is hosted by Dan and Chris Powers, both former hockey players. Dan Powers played at the junior level before transitioning to recreational "beer league" hockey. Former National Hockey League (NHL) player Nate Thompson also serves as a co-host.

Based in Los Angeles, the show utilizes a comedic style similar to the Almost Friday Media brand. The podcast produces daily content for social media platforms such as Instagram. The hosts interview figures from the hockey world, with past guests including P. K. Subban, Jonny Lazarus, Pete Blackburn, Tyler Toffoli, Bobby Ryan, Charlie McAvoy, and Chris Nelson. By 2025, the podcast expanded its format to include a "traveling team" segment, in which the hosts participate in competitive exhibition games against Senior A teams.

== Frank Ocean Coachella incident ==
In April 2023, the podcast received coverage from music and entertainment outlets after the hosts detailed their involvement in Frank Ocean's headlining set at Coachella. The production was originally designed to feature an elaborate stage setup with a functional ice rink.

Dan and Chris Powers auditioned for the performance at Paramount Studios upon the recommendation of podcast guest Chris "Nelly" Nelson, a former New Jersey Devils prospect who coordinates skating for Hollywood productions. The brothers rehearsed for over a month alongside approximately 120 other skaters, a group that included professional figure skaters and hockey players.

According to the hosts, the skating portion of the performance was removed on the day of the show due to an ankle injury sustained by Ocean. In a podcast episode released the following Tuesday, the hosts stated they were offered the opportunity to walk back and forth on stage in sequined Prada suits in lieu of skating. The brothers declined the offer. They further claimed that shortly before the reconfigured show began, Ocean asked for them by name, unaware they had already declined to participate as "walkers." The hosts also described an improvised fight choreography session during rehearsals where they skated and simulated a fight. Ocean reportedly viewed the sequence and established it as the baseline energy for the other skaters.

== Vail Yeti trip ==
In January 2025, the Empty Netters team traveled to Vail, Colorado, to play a series of exhibition games against the Vail Yeti, a Senior A hockey team. The games were physical, resulting in the Yeti winning both matches. During the trip, Dan Powers sustained a broken rib. The event involved interaction with opposing fans, who displayed signs mocking the podcast hosts with slogans such as "We're better than the empty netter." Co-host Nate Thompson was unable to attend the trip due to the January 2025 Southern California wildfires.

== Heated Rivalry coverage ==
In late 2025, the podcast gained attention for its coverage of Heated Rivalry, a television series adapted from a queer romance novel. Initially viewing the show to critique its realism regarding hockey, the hosts' commentary shifted to enthusiastic support for the plot and characters. Media outlets, including The New York Times and Vogue Adria, praised the coverage as a positive example of non-toxic masculinity in sports culture. The viral success of these segments reportedly led to a 50-fold increase in YouTube viewership.

In January 2026, the podcast became the subject of controversy following an Outsports report revealing private text messages in which host Dan Powers disparaged the series. The leaked messages, in which Powers complained about how the show's aim looked to have been checking inclusivity boxes, contrasted with the podcast's public praise. The report also noted prior criticism regarding the hosts' use of what some perceived as misogynistic language. Powers responded to the backlash by showing the messages, in their entirety, and their timeline, claiming the messages predated his actual viewing of the series, characterizing his remarks as an initial "lame writer's take" rather than a genuine review. OutSports did a follow up article after the response video, sticking by their initial reporting and claiming, without revealing any other texts, that several disparaging texts about the series were sent after the podcast began their coverage of the show.

== Commentary ==
The hosts provide commentary on current NHL events. In October 2025, a segment regarding the Edmonton Oilers gained traction after Dan Powers advised fans to remain calm despite the team's early-season struggles. Powers argued that star player Connor McDavid would ensure a playoff berth, remarking that fans should not worry about the regular season "if not for the fact that there's quite literally nothing to do in the city of Edmonton other than watch Oilers games".
