= Artur Beliakou =

Belarusian acrobatic gymnast (born 1993)

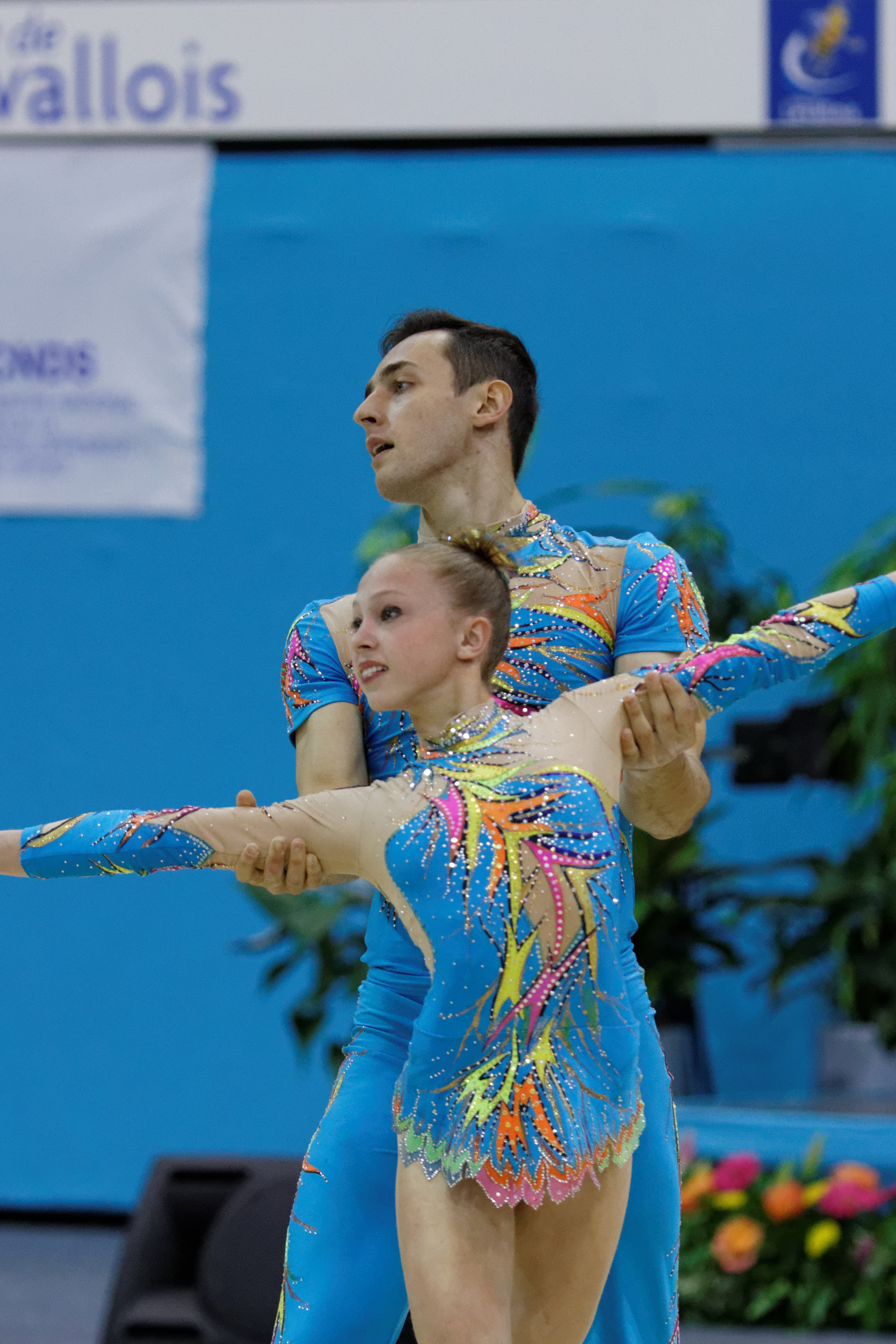
- Artur Beliakou and Aliona Dubinina at the 2014 Acrobatic Gymnastics World Championships.

Personal information
- Born: 20 May 1993 (age 33)

Gymnastics career
- Discipline: Acrobatic gymnastics
- Country represented: Belarus
Medal record
Acrobatic gymnastics
Representing Belarus
World Games
Silver medal – second place	2017 Wroclaw	Mixed pairs all-around
European Games
Gold medal – first place	2019 Minsk	Mixed pairs balance
Bronze medal – third place	2019 Minsk	Mixed pairs dynamic
Bronze medal – third place	2019 Minsk	Mixed pairs all-around
World Championships
Bronze medal – third place	2018 Antwerp	Team
European Championships
Silver medal – second place	2019 Holon	Mixed pairs dynamic

Artur Beliakou (Belarusian: Артур Белякоў, born 20 May 1993) is a Belarusian male acrobatic gymnast. With Aliona Dubinina, he competed in the 2014 Acrobatic Gymnastics World Championships.

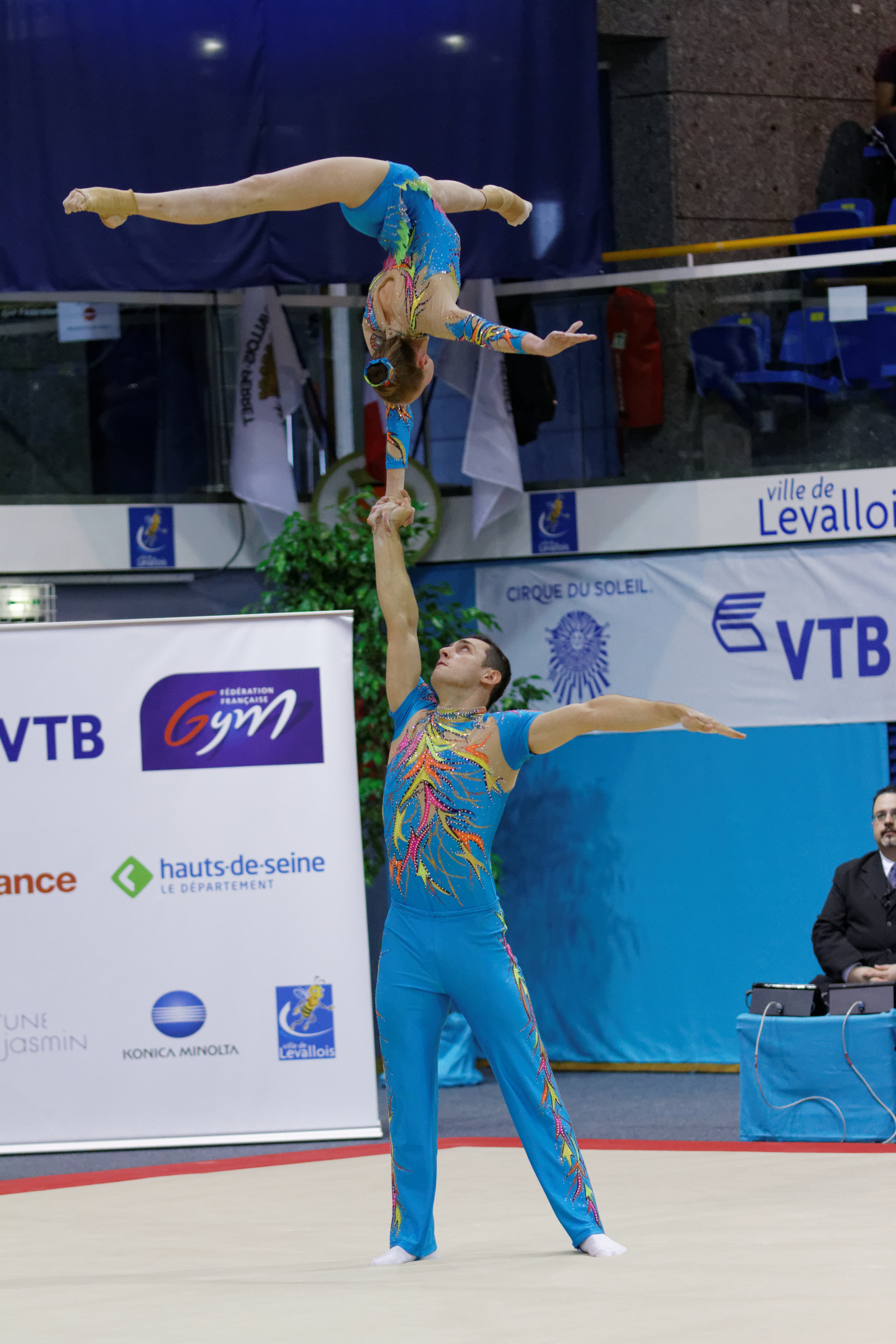
Arthur Beliakou and Aliona Dubinina at the 2014 Acrobatic Gymnastics World Championships.

At the 2017 World Games, he won a silver medal in the mixed pairs all-around event. At the 2018 Acrobatic Gymnastics World Championships, he won a bronze medal in the team event.

Beliakou competed at the 2019 European Games and won a gold medal. For his accomplishment, he was recognized by president Alexander Lukashenko. Later that year at the 2019 Acrobatic Gymnastics European Championships, he won a silver medal in the mixed pairs dynamic event.
