= Acrobatic gymnastics at the 2017 World Games – Mixed pairs all-around =

Sporting event

Mixed pairs all-around at the World Games
- Venue: Centennial Hall, Wrocław, Poland
- Date: 24 July 2017
- Competitors: 12 from 6 nations
- Winning total: 30.865 points

Medalists
1st place, gold medalist(s)		Marina Chernova; Georgii Pataraia	Russia
2nd place, silver medalist(s)		Volha Melnik; Artur Beliakou	Belarus
3rd place, bronze medalist(s)		Kathryn Williams; Lewis Walker	Great Britain

The mixed pairs all-around competition at the 2017 World Games held in Wrocław was played on 24 July. 12 acrobatic gymnastics competitors from 6 nations participated in the tournaWoment. The acrobatic gymnastics competition took place at Centennial Hall in Lower Silesian Voivodeship.

== Competition format ==
The top 4 teams in qualifications, based on combined scores of each round, advanced to the final. The scores in qualification do not count in the final.

== Qualification ==
Team	Balance		Dynamic		Total (All-around)	
Team	Score	Rank	Score	Rank	Score	Rank
Russia	29.690	1	30.640	1	60.330	1
Portugal	28.560	2	28.760	3	56.990	2
Belarus	27.970	3	28.760	2	56.730	3
Great Britain	27.180	4	28.170	4	55.350	4
United States	26.020	6	28.030	5	52.600	5
Poland	24.570	5	22.470	6	48.490	6

== Final ==
Rank	Team	Difficulty	Artistry	Execution	Penalty	Total (All-around)
Rank	Team	Score	Score	Score	Score	Score
1st place, gold medalist(s)	Russia	3.290	9.175	18.400	-0.000	30.865
2nd place, silver medalist(s)	Belarus	3.290	9.175	18.400	-0.000	30.865
3rd place, bronze medalist(s)	Great Britain	2.710	8.950	17.150	-0.000	28.810
4	Portugal	3.050	8.750	16.900	-0.000	28.700

== Final standing ==
Rank	Team
1st place, gold medalist(s)	Russia
2nd place, silver medalist(s)	Belarus
3rd place, bronze medalist(s)	Great Britain
4	Portugal
5	United States
6	Poland

== Medalists ==
Event	Gold	Silver	Bronze
Pairs all-around	Russia; Marina Chernova; Georgii Pataraia	Belarus; Volha Melnik; Artur Beliakou	Great Britain; Kathryn Williams; Lewis Walker

== See also ==
- Acrobatic gymnastics at the 2017 World Games – Men's pairs all-around
- Acrobatic gymnastics at the 2017 World Games – Women's pairs all-around
