= Kim Hye-song (gymnast) =

North Korean gymnast (born 1997)

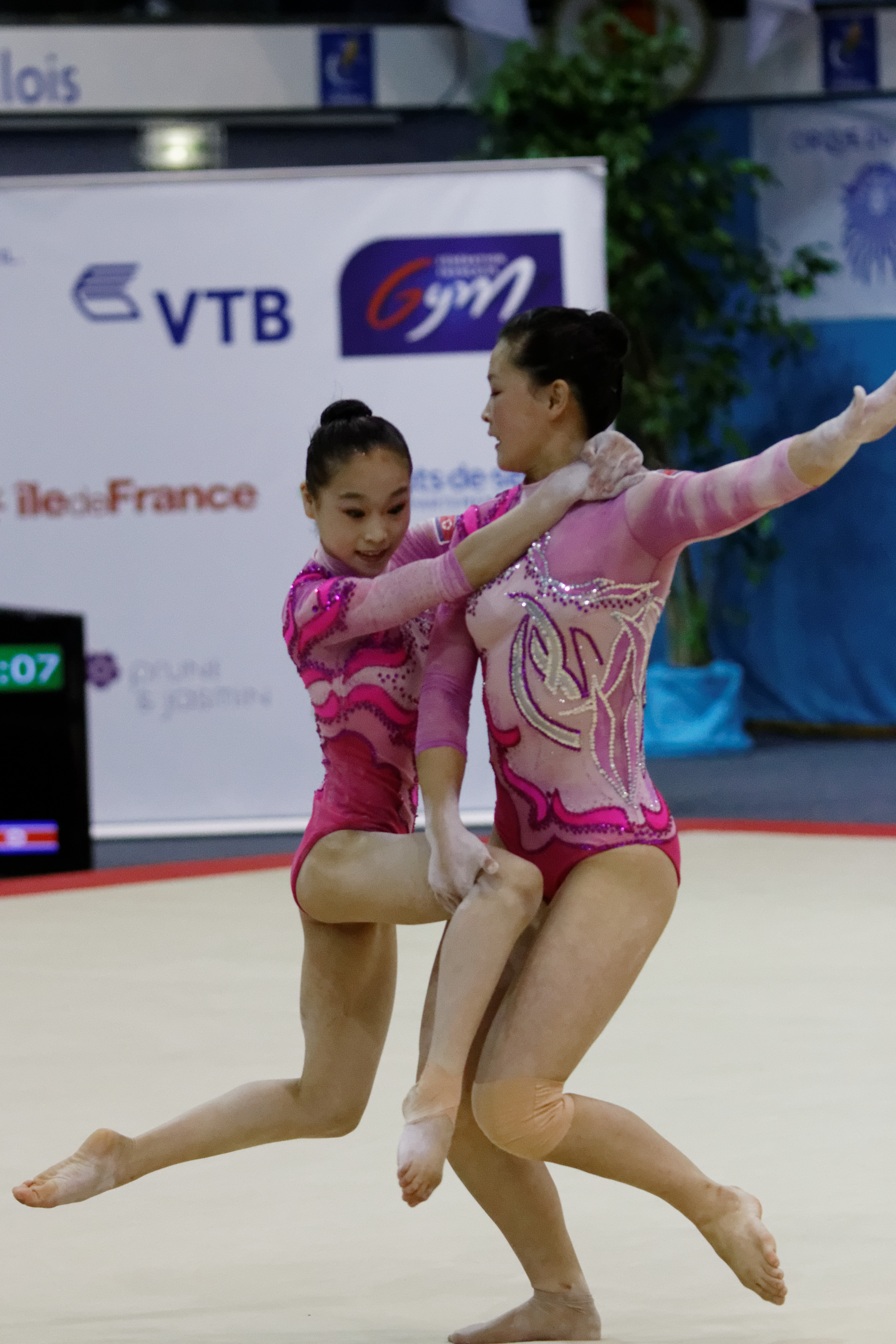
- Kim Hye-song (left) and Jong Kum-hwa

Personal information
- Born: September 8, 1997 (age 28)

Gymnastics career
- Discipline: Acrobatic gymnastics
- Country represented: North Korea

Korean name
- Hangul: 김혜성
- RR: Gim Hyeseong
- MR: Kim Hyesŏng

Kim Hye-song (Korean: 김혜성; born September 8, 1997) is a North Korean female acrobatic gymnast. With partner Jong Kum-hwa, Kim achieved 5th in the 2014 Acrobatic Gymnastics World Championships.
