= Irina Nazimova =

Ukrainian acrobatic gymnast (born 1997)

Iryna Nazimova
- Born: 7 February 1997 (age 29) Bilhorod-Dnistrovskyi, Odesa oblast, Ukraine

Gymnastics career
- Discipline: Acrobatic gymnastics
- Country represented: Ukraine
- Head coaches: Myroslava Kovzun; Mykhaylo Sorochan
Medal record
Women's acrobatic gymnastics
Representing Ukraine
World Games
Bronze medal – third place	2017 Wrocław	Pairs all-around

Iryna Nazimova (Ukrainian: Ірина Назімова, born 7 February 1997 in Bilhorod-Dnistrovskyi) is a Ukrainian female acrobatic gymnast and professional hand-balancer.

== Career ==
Nazimova began doing acrobatic gymnastics in 2004 at age seven.

In 2014, Nazimova with her partner Veronika Habelok firstly competed at the international tournament, dedicated to the 60th anniversary of Bilhorod-Dnistrovskyi Youth Sports School.

The following years, the duo competed at the 2016 Acrobatic Gymnastics World Championships, finishing 7th in the pairs all-around event in final.

At the 2017 Acrobatic Gymnastics European Championships Habelok and Nazimova finished 4th in the pairs all-around event.

Later, the duo won a bronze medal in the pairs all-around event at the 2017 World Games in Wrocław.

During the Russian invasion of Ukraine the duo Habelok/Nazimova left Ukraine through Romanian border and fled to the United States, where they rejoined the Flip Circus.
