= United Arab Emirates at the 2017 World Games =

- IOC code: UAE

in Wrocław, Poland 20 July 2017 – 30 July 2017
- Medals: Gold 1 Silver 1 Bronze 1 Total 3

World Games appearances
- 1981; 1985; 1989; 1993; 1997; 2001; 2005; 2009; 2013; 2017; 2022; 2025

The United Arab Emirates competed at the 2017 World Games held in Wrocław, Poland.

== Medalists ==
Medal	Name	Sport	Event
Gold	Faisal Al-Ketbi	Ju-jitsu	Men's ne-waza 94 kg
Silver	Faisal Al-Ketbi	Ju-jitsu	Men's ne-waza open
Bronze	Cornelia Mihai	Air sports	Parachuting canopy piloting

== Air sports ==
Cornelia Mihai won the bronze medal in the parachuting canopy piloting event.

== Ju-jitsu ==
Faisal Al-Ketbi won the gold medal in the men's ne-waza 94 kg event and the silver medal in the men's ne-waza open event.
