= Japan at the 2017 World Games =

Japan at the World Games 2017
- IOC code: JPN
- NOC: Japanese Olympic Committee

in Wrocław, Poland 20 July 2017 – 30 July 2017
- Competitors: 58 in 6 sports
- Medals Ranked 7th: Gold 9 Silver 6 Bronze 7 Total 22

World Games appearances
- 1981; 1985; 1989; 1993; 1997; 2001; 2005; 2009; 2013; 2017; 2022; 2025

Japan competed at the World Games 2017 in Wrocław, Poland, from 20 July 2017 to 30 July 2017.

== Medalists ==
Medal	Name	Sport	Event	Date
Gold	Yoshiyuki Ogata	Sport climbing	Men's boulder	21 July
Gold	Riri Kitazume; Mizuki Saito; Takumi Kanai	Aerobic gymnastics	Open event trio	22 July
Gold	Naoya Hirano; Keisuke Hatano; Shun Nishiyama; Suguru Ando	Lifesaving	Men's 4 x 50 m obstacle relay	22 July
Gold	Keiichiro Korenaga	Sport climbing	Men's lead	23 July
Gold	Kiyou Shimizu	Karate	Women's kata	25 July
Gold	Ryo Kiyuna	Karate	Men's kata	25 July
Gold	Ayumi Uekusa	Karate	Women's kumite +68 kg	26 July
Gold	Hideyoshi Kagawa	Karate	Men's kumite +84 kg	26 July
Gold	Shota Tezuka	Water skiing	Men's wakeboard	27 July
Silver	Miho Nonaka	Sport climbing	Women's boulder	21 July
Silver	Asano Ota	Sumo	Women's middleweight	22 July
Silver	Yuki Hada	Sport climbing	Men's lead	23 July
Silver	Yukako Fukushima	Powerlifting	Women's lightweight	24 July
Silver	Miho Miyahara	Karate	Women's kumite 50 kg	25 July
Silver	Ryutaro Araga	Karate	Men's kumite 84 kg	26 July
Bronze	Soichiro Kurokawa	Sumo	Men's heavyweight	22 July
Bronze	Hayato Miwa	Sumo	Men's openweight	23 July
Bronze	Takato Nakazono; Yamato Ishikawa	Trampoline gymnastics	Men's synchronized trampoline	24 July
Bronze	Wataru Onuki	Archery	Men's individual recurve	25 July
Bronze	Kayo Someya	Karate	Women's kumite 68 kg	26 July
Bronze	Hiroshi Kuraoka	Ju-jitsu	Men's ne-waza 62 kg	28 July
Bronze	Naoyuki Ōi	Cue sports	Men's 9-ball pool	29 July

== Competitors ==
Sports	Men	Women	Total	Events
American football	22	0	22	1
Lacrosse	0	18	18	1
Karate	3	3	6	6
Rhythmic gymnastics	0	2	2	1
Sumo	3	3	6	6
Trampoline	2	2	4	2
Ultimate	7	7	14	1
Total	37	35	72	18

== American football ==
Japan has qualified at the 2017 World Games in the American football Men Team event.

== Gymnastic ==
=== Rhythmic gymnastics ===
Japan has qualified at the 2017 World Games:

- Women's individual event - 2 quotas

=== Trampoline ===
Japan has qualified at the 2017 World Games:

- Men's Synchronized Trampoline - 1 quota
- Women's Synchronized Trampoline - 1 quota

== Karate ==
Japan has qualified at the 2017 World Games:

- Men's Individual Kumite -84 kg - 1 quota (Ryutaro Araga)
- Men's Individual Kumite +84 kg - 1 quota (Hideyoshi Kagawa)
- Men's Individual Kata - 1 quota (Ryo Kiyuna)
- Women's Individual Kumite -50 kg - 1 quota (Ayaka Tadano)
- Women's Individual Kumite -68 kg - 1 quota (Kayo Someya)
- Women's Individual Kata - 1 quota (Kiyou Shimizu)

== Lacrosse ==
Japan has qualified at the 2017 World Games in the Lacrosse Women Team event.

== Sumo ==
Japan has qualified at the 2017 World Games:

- Men's Lightweight - 1 quota
- Men's Middleweight - 1 quota
- Men's Heavyweight - 1 quota
- Women's Lightweight - 1 quota
- Women's Middleweight - 1 quota
- Women's Heavyweight - 1 quota
