= Great Britain at the 2017 World Games =

Great Britain at the World Games 2017
- IOC code: GBR
- NOC: British Olympic Committee

in Wrocław, Poland 20 July 2017 – 30 July 2017
- Competitors: 36 +1 athlete in invitational sport in 3 + 1 invitational discipline (kickboxing) sports
- Medals: Gold 3 Silver 4 Bronze 4 Total 11

World Games appearances
- 1981; 1985; 1989; 1993; 1997; 2001; 2005; 2009; 2013; 2017; 2022; 2025

Great Britain competed at the World Games 2017 in Wrocław, Poland, from July 20 to July 30, 2017.

== Medalists ==
The following competitors won medals at the Games for Great Britain:

Medal	Name	Sport	Event	Date
Gold	Conor Sawenko; Charlie Tate; Adam Upcott; Lewis Watts	Acrobatic gymnastics	Men's group all-around	26 July
Gold	Kyren Wilson	Cue sports	Snooker	30 July
Gold	David Callcutt; Ian Daniels; Wayne Evans; David Field; David Hammersley; Edward Holland; James Murphy; Edward Shannon; Adrian Webb	Tug of war	Men's outdoor 640 kg	30 July
Silver	Naomi Folkard	Archery	Women's recurve individual	25 July
Silver	Jordan Thomas	Karate	Men's kumite 67 kg	25 July
Silver	Jayson Shaw	Cue sports	Men's 9-ball pool	29 July
Silver	Ali Carter	Cue sports	Snooker	30 July
Bronze	Kathryn Williams; Lewis Walker	Acrobatic gymnastics	Mixed pairs all-around	24 July
Bronze	Isabel Haigh; Emily Hancock; Ilisha Boardman	Acrobatic gymnastics	Women's group all-around	25 July
Bronze	Lucie Colebeck	Trampoline gymnastics	Women's tumbling	25 July
Bronze	David Bowyer; James Dewsberry; Leonard Jarram; William Lee; James Murphy; Ian Robinson; Lee Robinson; Justin Sheppard	Tug of war	Men's outdoor 700 kg	29 July

== Competitors ==
Sports	Men	Women	Total	Events
Korfball	7	7	14	1
Lacrosse	0	18	18	1
Trampoline	2	2	4	4
Kickboxing	0	1	1	1
Total	9	28	36	6

== Gymnastic ==
=== Trampoline ===
Great Britain has qualified at the 2017 World Games:

- Men's Individual Double Mini Trampoline - 1 quota
- Men's Individual Tumbling - 1 quota
- Women's Individual Double Mini Trampoline - 1 quota
- Women's Individual Tumbling - 1 quota

== Korfball ==
Great Britain has qualified at the 2017 World Games in the Korfball Mixed Team event.

== Lacrosse ==
Great Britain has qualified at the 2017 World Games in the Lacrosse Women event.

== Kickboxing ==
Kickboxing - Is on the World Games for the first time as an invitational sport. Only one GB Fighter has qualified during the European Championships in Slovenia 2016. Division = K1, Female -52 kg Monika Markowska from Jersey, UK.

== Tug of war ==
Great Britain won the gold medal in the men's outdoor 640 kg event and the bronze medal in the men's outdoor 700 kg event.
