= Sukui Nage =

Judo technique

- Illustration of judoka performing Sukui-nage throw
- Classification: Nage-waza
- Sub classification: Te-waza
- Targets: Legs
- Kodokan: Yes

Technique name
- Rōmaji: Sukui Nage
- Japanese: 掬投
- English: Scoop throw
- Korean: 다리 들어 메치기

Sukui Nage (掬投) is one of the original 40 throws of Judo as developed by Jigoro Kano. It belongs to the fourth group, Yonkyo, of the traditional throwing list, Gokyo (no waza), of Kodokan Judo. It is also part of the current 67 Throws of Kodokan Judo. It is classified as a hand technique, Te-waza.

As of 2010, the IJF has banned grabs to the legs and as such this technique is no longer allowed in competitions with IJF rules. To grab at the legs in Judo competitions with IJF rules will result in a shido (penalty).
