= Romania at the 2017 World Games =

- IOC code: ROU

in Wrocław, Poland 20 July 2017 – 30 July 2017
- Medals Ranked 50th: Gold 0 Silver 1 Bronze 1 Total 2

World Games appearances
- 1981; 1985; 1989; 1993; 1997; 2001; 2005; 2009; 2013; 2017; 2022; 2025

Romania competed at the 2017 World Games held in Wrocław, Poland.

== Medalists ==
Medal	Name	Sport	Event
Silver	Gabriel Bocser; Andreea Bogati; Lucian Săvulescu; Dacian Barna; Marian Brotei	Aerobic gymnastics	Open event group
Bronze	Andreea Bogati; Dacian Barna	Aerobic gymnastics	Mixed pairs

== Aerobic gymnastics ==
Gabriel Bocser, Andreea Bogati, Lucian Săvulescu, Dacian Barna and Marian Brotei won the silver medal in the open event group event.

Andreea Bogati and Dacian Barna won the bronze medal in the mixed pairs events.

== Dancesport ==
Paul Ionut Rednic and Roxana Lucaciu competed in the Standard competition.
