= Mongolia at the 2017 World Games =

Mongolia at the World Games 2017
- IOC code: MGL
- NOC: Mongolian National Olympic Committee

in Wrocław, Poland 20 July 2017 – 30 July 2017
- Competitors: 4 in 1 sport
- Medals: Gold 1 Silver 1 Bronze 1 Total 3

World Games appearances
- 1981; 1985; 1989; 1993; 1997; 2001; 2005; 2009; 2013; 2017; 2022; 2025

Mongolia competed at the World Games 2017 in Wrocław, Poland, from 20 July 2017 to 30 July 2017.

== Competitors ==
Sports	Men	Women	Total	Events
Sumo	2	2	4	4
Total	2	2	4	4

== Sumo ==
Mongolia has qualified at the 2017 World Games:

- Men's Middleweight - 1 quota
- Men's Heavyweight - 1 quota
- Women's Lightweight - 1 quota
- Women's Middleweight - 1 quota
