= South Africa at the 2017 World Games =

South Africa at the World Games 2017
- IOC code: RSA
- NOC: South African Sports Confederation and Olympic Committee

in Wrocław, Poland 20 July 2017 – 30 July 2017
- Competitors: 4 in 3 sports
- Medals Ranked 57th: Gold 0 Silver 0 Bronze 1 Total 1

World Games appearances
- 1981; 1985; 1989; 1993; 1997; 2001; 2005; 2009; 2013; 2017; 2022; 2025

South Africa competed at the World Games 2017 in Wrocław, Poland, from 20 July 2017 to 30 July 2017.

== Competitors ==
Sports	Men	Women	Total	Events
Archery	0	1	1	1
Rhythmic gymnastics	0	1	1	1
Trampoline	1	1	2	2
Total	1	3	4	4

== Archery ==
South Africa has qualified at the 2017 World Games:

- Men's Individual Compound - 1 quota (Riaan Crowther)

== Gymnastic ==
=== Rhythmic gymnastics ===
South Africa has qualified at the 2017 World Games:

- Women's individual event - 1 quota

=== Trampoline ===
South Africa has qualified at the 2017 World Games:

- Men's Individual Double Mini Trampoline - 1 quota
- Women's Individual Tumbling - 1 quota

== Tug of war ==
South Africa won the bronze medal in the women's indoor 540 kg event.
