= Canada at the 2017 World Games =

- IOC code: CAN
- NOC: Canadian Olympic Committee

in Wrocław, Poland July 20, 2017 – July 30, 2017
- Competitors: 24 in 4 sports

World Games appearances
- 1981; 1985; 1989; 1993; 1997; 2001; 2005; 2009; 2013; 2017; 2022; 2025

Canada competed at the 2017 World Games in Wrocław, Poland, from July 20, 2017 to July 30, 2017.

== Competitors ==
Sports	Men	Women	Total	Events
Boules sports	0	1	1	1
Lacrosse	0	18	18	1
Powerlifting	2	2	4	1
Trampoline	2	2	3	4
Total	2	21	23	6

== Air sports ==
Sven Jseppi finished 19th in the Parachuting - Canopy Piloting event.

== Boules sports ==
Canada has qualified at the 2017 World Games:

- Petanque Women's Singles Precision Shooting - 1 quota

== Bowling ==
François Lavoie and Dan Maclelland won the gold medal in Men's Doubles.

== Gymnastic ==
=== Trampoline ===
Canada has qualified at the 2017 World Games:

- Men's Individual Double Mini Trampoline - 1 quota
- Men's Individual Tumbling - 1 quota
- Women's Individual Double Mini Trampoline - 1 quota
- Women's Individual Tumbling - 1 quota

== Kickboxing ==
Jason Hinds won the silver medal in Men's K1 -67 kg event. Scott Bartlett also represented Canada in Men's -91 kg event.

== Lacrosse ==
Canada won silver in women's lacrosse, losing to U.S. 11-8 in the final. 2017 was the first year that the World Games included any version of lacrosse.

== Muaythai ==
Janice Lyn represented Canada in Women's 57 kg event.

== Powerlifting ==
Ryan Stinn finished 6th in the Men's Super Heavyweight event. Ryan lifted 385.0 kg, 285.0 kg and 295.0 kg respectively in the squat, bench press and deadlift disciplines. His total weight of 965.0 kg was the 5th heaviest, but due to a scoring system factoring the weight of the competitor, he finished 6th in points.

== Sport climbing ==
Sean McColl won the bronze medal in Men's Lead event.
