= Israel at the 2017 World Games =

Israel at the World Games 2017
- IOC code: ISR
- NOC: Olympic Committee of Israel
- Website: www.olympic.one.co.il

in Wrocław, Poland 20 July 2017 – 30 July 2017
- Competitors: 2 in 2 sports

World Games appearances
- 2005; 2009; 2013; 2017; 2022; 2025

Israel competed at the World Games 2017 in Wrocław, Poland, from 20 July 2017 to 30 July 2017.

== Competitors ==
Sports	Men	Women	Total	Events
Muaythai	1	0	1	1
Rhythmic gymnastics	0	1	1	1
Total	1	1	2	2

== Gymnastic ==
Israel has qualified at the 2017 World Games:

- Rhythmic gymnastics – 1 quota

== Muaythai ==
Israel has qualified at the 2017 World Games:

- Men's -63.5 kg - 1 quota (Itay Guyer)
- Women's -60 kg – 1 quota (Nili Block)
