= China at the 2017 World Games =

- IOC code: CHN
- NOC: Chinese Olympic Committee

in Wrocław, Poland 20 July 2017 – 30 July 2017
- Competitors: 23 in 4 sports

World Games appearances
- 1981; 1985; 1989; 1993; 1997; 2001; 2005; 2009; 2013; 2017; 2022; 2025

China competed at the 2017 World Games in Wrocław, Poland, from July 20, 2017, to July 30, 2017.

== Competitors ==
Sports	Men	Women	Total	Events
Boules sports	2	0	2	2
Karate	0	1	1	1
Korfball	7	7	14	1
Trampoline	3	3	6	4
Total	12	11	23	8

== Boules sports ==
China has qualified at the 2017 World Games:

- Lyonnaise Men's Singles Precision Shooting - 1 quota
- Lyonnaise Men's Singles Progressive Shooting - 1 quota

== Gymnastic ==
=== Trampoline ===
China has qualified at the 2017 World Games:

- Men's Individual Tumbling - 1 quota
- Men's Synchronized Trampoline - 1 quota
- Women's Individual Tumbling - 1 quota
- Women's Synchronized Trampoline - 1 quota

== Karate ==
China has qualified at the 2017 World Games:

- Women's Individual Kumite -61 kg - 1 quota

== Korfball ==
China has qualified at the 2017 World Games in the Korfball Mixed Team event.

== Tug of war ==
China won the silver medal in the women's indoor 540 kg event.
