= 2015 Karate1 Premier League =

The Karate 1 – Premier League 2015 is a series of international karate competitions organized by the World Karate Federation (WKF) during the year 2015. The series includes several stages of the Premier League circuit and concludes with the Grand Final event. It features top-level karate athletes from around the world competing in kata and kumite events.

This series is considered one of the most important in international karate, contributing to the global ranking of athletes

== Events ==
Karate 1 – Premier League 2015
Stages	Date	Series	City	Country
1	23–25 January 2015	Premier League – Paris	Paris	France
2	14–15 February 2015	Premier League – Almere	Almere	Netherlands
3	28 February – 1 March 2015	Premier League – Sharm El Sheikh	Sharm El Sheikh	Egypt
4	30–31 May 2015	Premier League – Brazil	São Paulo	Brazil
5	5–6 September 2015	Premier League – Istanbul	Istanbul	Turkey
6	26–27 September 2015	Premier League – Coburg	Coburg	Germany
7	17–18 October 2015	Premier League – Salzburg	Salzburg	Austria
8	28–29 November 2015	Premier League – Okinawa	Okinawa	Japan

== Karate1 Premier League - Paris 2015 ==
The Karate 1 Premier League – Paris 2015 was held on 23–25 January 2015 in Paris, France.

=== Men ===
Event	Gold	Silver	Bronze
Individual kata	Issei Shimbaba; Japan	Damián Quintero; Spain	Vu Duc Minh Dack; France
Individual kata	Issei Shimbaba; Japan	Damián Quintero; Spain	Jorge Caeiros; Portugal
Team kata	France; Lucas Jeannot; Enzo Montarello; Ahmed Zemouri	Kuwait; Abdulhusain Saied Salman; Abdulhusain Sayed Mohammad; Husain Mohammad	Spain; José Manuel Carbonell; Miguel Zamorano; Sergio Zamorano
Team kata	France; Lucas Jeannot; Enzo Montarello; Ahmed Zemouri	Kuwait; Abdulhusain Saied Salman; Abdulhusain Sayed Mohammad; Husain Mohammad	Italy; Mattia Busato; Alessandro Iodice; Alfredo Tocco
Kumite -60 kg	Sergey Spitsin; Russia	Geoffrey Berens; Netherlands	Ali Mohamed; Egypt
Kumite -60 kg	Sergey Spitsin; Russia	Geoffrey Berens; Netherlands	Angelo Crescenzo; Italy
Kumite -67 kg	Magdy Hanafy; Egypt	Redouan Kousseksou; Morocco	Tural Aghalarzade; Azerbaijan
Kumite -67 kg	Magdy Hanafy; Egypt	Redouan Kousseksou; Morocco	Yves Martial Tadissi; Hungary
Kumite -75 kg	Rene Smaal; Netherlands	William Wierdis; Italy	Thomas Scott; United States
Kumite -75 kg	Rene Smaal; Netherlands	William Wierdis; Italy	Stanislav Horuna; Ukraine
Kumite -84 kg	Zabiollah Poorshab; Iran	Gogita Arkania; Georgia	Georgios Tzanos; Greece
Kumite -84 kg	Zabiollah Poorshab; Iran	Gogita Arkania; Georgia	Kenji Grillon; France
Kumite +84 kg	Ossama Mansour; Egypt	Jonathan Horne; Germany	Iman Sanchooli; Iran
Kumite +84 kg	Ossama Mansour; Egypt	Jonathan Horne; Germany	Shahin Atamov; Azerbaijan

=== Women ===
Event	Gold	Silver	Bronze
Individual kata	Emiri Iwamoto; Japan	Sandra Sánchez Jaime; United Arab Emirates	Alexandra Feracci; France
Individual kata	Emiri Iwamoto; Japan	Sandra Sánchez Jaime; United Arab Emirates	Grace Lau Mo-sheung; Hong Kong
Team kata	Italy; Sara Battaglia; Viviana Bottaro; Michela Pezzetti	France; Claire Gandit; Marie Bui; Lila Bui	Germany; Marina Albers; Susanne Beinvogl; Lisa Kirchner
Team kata	Italy; Sara Battaglia; Viviana Bottaro; Michela Pezzetti	France; Claire Gandit; Marie Bui; Lila Bui	Croatia; Vlatka Kiuk; Petra Krivičić; Mihaela Petrović
Kumite -50 kg	Alexandra Recchia; France	Sophia Bouderbane; France	Kateryna Kryva; Ukraine
Kumite -50 kg	Alexandra Recchia; France	Sophia Bouderbane; France	Ku Tsui-ping; Chinese Taipei
Kumite -55 kg	Yassmin Attia; Egypt	Emilie Thouy; France	Zhanna Melnyk; Ukraine
Kumite -55 kg	Yassmin Attia; Egypt	Emilie Thouy; France	Jelena Kovačević; Croatia
Kumite -61 kg	Giana Lotfy; Egypt	Nicole Forcella; Italy	Ana Lenard; Croatia
Kumite -61 kg	Giana Lotfy; Egypt	Nicole Forcella; Italy	Lucie Ignace; France
Kumite -68 kg	Alizée Agier; France	Lamia Matoub; Algeria	Ivona Tubić; Croatia
Kumite -68 kg	Alizée Agier; France	Lamia Matoub; Algeria	Kayo Someya; Japan
Kumite +68 kg	Nadège Ait Ibrahim; France	Ayumi Uekusa; Japan	Clio Ferracuti; Italy
Kumite +68 kg	Nadège Ait Ibrahim; France	Ayumi Uekusa; Japan	Anne-Laure Florentin; France

== Karate1 Premier League - Almere 2015 ==
The Karate 1 Premier League – Almere 2015''' was held on 14–15 February 2015 in Almere, Netherlands.

=== Men ===
Event	Gold	Silver	Bronze
Individual kata	Damián Quintero; Spain	Francisco Salazar Jover; Spain	José Manuel Carbonell López; Spain
Individual kata	Damián Quintero; Spain	Francisco Salazar Jover; Spain	Jorge Caeiros; Portugal
Team kata	Italy; Mattia Busato; Alessandro Iodice; Alfredo Tocco	France; Lucas Jeannot; Enzo Montarello; Ahmed Zemouri	Croatia; Ivan Ermenc; Franjo Maskarin; Damjan Padovan
Team kata	Italy; Mattia Busato; Alessandro Iodice; Alfredo Tocco	France; Lucas Jeannot; Enzo Montarello; Ahmed Zemouri	Turkey; Arslan Caliskan; Orcun Duman; Ali Sofuoglu
Kumite -60 kg	Geoffrey Berens; Netherlands	David Tkebuchava; Georgia	Firdovsi Farzaliyev; Azerbaijan
Kumite -60 kg	Geoffrey Berens; Netherlands	David Tkebuchava; Georgia	Michael Dasoul; Belgium
Kumite -67 kg	Redouan Kousseksou; Morocco	Vinicius Rezende Figueira; Brazil	Steven Da Costa; France
Kumite -67 kg	Redouan Kousseksou; Morocco	Vinicius Rezende Figueira; Brazil	Thomas Kaserer; Austria
Kumite -75 kg	Serkan Yagci; United Arab Emirates	Ludvig Abild; Denmark	Rafael Aghayev; Azerbaijan
Kumite -75 kg	Serkan Yagci; United Arab Emirates	Ludvig Abild; Denmark	Logan Da Costa; France
Kumite -84 kg	Kenji Grillon; France	Ugur Aktas; Turkey	Donovan Wold; Netherlands
Kumite -84 kg	Kenji Grillon; France	Ugur Aktas; Turkey	Simon Antikj; North Macedonia
Kumite +84 kg	Jonathan Horne; Germany	Shahin Atamov; Azerbaijan	Velimir Jeknic; Serbia
Kumite +84 kg	Jonathan Horne; Germany	Shahin Atamov; Azerbaijan	Moreno Sheppard; Netherlands

=== Women ===
Event	Gold	Silver	Bronze
Individual kata	Maria Dimitrova; Dominican Republic	Veronika Miskova; Czech Republic	Sandra Sánchez Jaime; United Arab Emirates
Individual kata	Maria Dimitrova; Dominican Republic	Veronika Miskova; Czech Republic	Maryia Fursava; Belarus
Team kata	Italy; Sara Battaglia; Viviana Bottaro; Michela Pezzetti	Germany; Jasmin Bleul; Christine Heinrich; Sophie Wachter	Belarus; Aliaksandra Fursava; Maryia Fursava; Darya Rahautsova
Team kata	Italy; Sara Battaglia; Viviana Bottaro; Michela Pezzetti	Germany; Jasmin Bleul; Christine Heinrich; Sophie Wachter	Croatia; Vlatka Kiuk; Petra Krivičić; Mihaela Petrović
Kumite -50 kg	Bettina Plank; Austria	Shahrun Yusifova; Azerbaijan	Yamila Benitez; Argentina
Kumite -50 kg	Bettina Plank; Austria	Shahrun Yusifova; Azerbaijan	Alexandra Recchia; France
Kumite -55 kg	Valéria Kumizaki; Brazil	Cristina Ferrer Garcia; Spain	Tuba Yakan; Turkey
Kumite -55 kg	Valéria Kumizaki; Brazil	Cristina Ferrer Garcia; Spain	Zhanna Melnyk; Ukraine
Kumite -61 kg	Lucie Ignace; France	Ingrida Suchankova; Slovakia	Carla Burkitt; England
Kumite -61 kg	Lucie Ignace; France	Ingrida Suchankova; Slovakia	Lucile Breton; France
Kumite -68 kg	Alisa Buchinger; Austria	Vassiliki Panetsidou; Greece	Kamila Warda; Poland
Kumite -68 kg	Alisa Buchinger; Austria	Vassiliki Panetsidou; Greece	Amelia Harvey; England
Kumite +68 kg	Anne-Laure Florentin; France	Helena Kuusisto; Finland	Hana Antunovic; Sweden
Kumite +68 kg	Anne-Laure Florentin; France	Helena Kuusisto; Finland	Anastasiya Stepashko; Ukraine

== Karate1 Premier League - Sharm El Sheikh 2015 ==
The Karate 1 Premier League – Sharm El Sheikh 2015 was held on 28 February – 1 March 2015 in Sharm El Sheikh, Egypt.

=== Men ===
Event	Gold	Silver	Bronze
Individual kata	Mohamed Hamdy Sayed; Egypt	Mehmet Yakan; Turkey	Mohammed El Hanni; Morocco
Individual kata	Mohamed Hamdy Sayed; Egypt	Mehmet Yakan; Turkey	Adnane Elhakimi; Morocco
Team kata	France; Lucas Jeannot; Enzo Montarello; Ahmed Zemouri	Kuwait; Abdulhusain Saied Salman; Abdulhusain Sayed Mohammad; Husain Mohammad	Turkey; Arslan Caliskan; Orcun Duman; Ali Sofuoglu
Team kata	France; Lucas Jeannot; Enzo Montarello; Ahmed Zemouri	Kuwait; Abdulhusain Saied Salman; Abdulhusain Sayed Mohammad; Husain Mohammad	Egypt; Nour Tarek Abdelbaset; Moustafa Elbaz; Aly Elkomy
Kumite -60 kg	Aykut Kaya; Turkey	Malek Salama; Egypt	Mohamed Aly Gamal; Egypt
Kumite -60 kg	Aykut Kaya; Turkey	Malek Salama; Egypt	Emad Al Malki; Saudi Arabia
Kumite -67 kg	Ahmed Abdelrahman; Egypt	Abdelilah Boujdi; Morocco	Fahad Alkhathami; Saudi Arabia
Kumite -67 kg	Ahmed Abdelrahman; Egypt	Abdelilah Boujdi; Morocco	Magdy Hanafy; Egypt
Kumite -75 kg	Luigi Busa; Italy	Serkan Yagci; United Arab Emirates	Mohamed Gaafar; Egypt
Kumite -75 kg	Luigi Busa; Italy	Serkan Yagci; United Arab Emirates	Ahmed Solyman; Egypt
Kumite -84 kg	Mahmoud Adham; Egypt	Ziya Yasar; Turkey	Ugur Aktas; Turkey
Kumite -84 kg	Mahmoud Adham; Egypt	Ziya Yasar; Turkey	Hany Keshta; Egypt
Kumite +84 kg	Ossama Mansour; Egypt	Asiman Gurbanli; Azerbaijan	Ridvan Kaptan; Turkey
Kumite +84 kg	Ossama Mansour; Egypt	Asiman Gurbanli; Azerbaijan	Enes Erkan; Turkey

=== Women ===
Event	Gold	Silver	Bronze
Individual kata	Sandra Sánchez Jaime; United Arab Emirates	Anna Kreshchenko; Ukraine	Sviatlana Yermakova; Belarus
Individual kata	Sandra Sánchez Jaime; United Arab Emirates	Anna Kreshchenko; Ukraine	Terryana D'Onofrio; Italy
Team kata	Egypt; Randa Abdelaziz; Shaimaa Roshdy; Mai Salama	Egypt; Asmaa Abdelmegeed; Shorok Eissa; Menatollah Abd_Alsabor	Egypt; Bothina Abdelfattah; Toka Ezzat; Lina Hassan
Team kata	Egypt; Randa Abdelaziz; Shaimaa Roshdy; Mai Salama	Egypt; Asmaa Abdelmegeed; Shorok Eissa; Menatollah Abd_Alsabor	Egypt; Nabila Mohammed; Merna Abdelhameed; Aya Ebrahim
Kumite -50 kg	Serap Ozcelik; Turkey	Areeg Rashed; Egypt	Eman Aboeriba; Egypt
Kumite -50 kg	Serap Ozcelik; Turkey	Areeg Rashed; Egypt	Khawla Ouhammad; Morocco
Kumite -55 kg	Tuba Yakan; Turkey	Yassmin Attia; Egypt	Wen Tzu-yun; Chinese Taipei
Kumite -55 kg	Tuba Yakan; Turkey	Yassmin Attia; Egypt	Sara Cardin; Italy
Kumite -61 kg	Giana Lotfy; Egypt	Merve Coban; Turkey	Randa Roshdy; Egypt
Kumite -61 kg	Giana Lotfy; Egypt	Merve Coban; Turkey	Nada Khamis Elsayed; Egypt
Kumite -68 kg	Hafsa Seyda Burucu; Turkey	Iryna Zaretska; United Arab Emirates	Rawan Rezika; Egypt
Kumite -68 kg	Hafsa Seyda Burucu; Turkey	Iryna Zaretska; United Arab Emirates	Marrah Magdi; Egypt
Kumite +68 kg	Meltem Hocaoglu; Turkey	Vera Kovaleva; Russia	Faten Aissa; Tunisia
Kumite +68 kg	Meltem Hocaoglu; Turkey	Vera Kovaleva; Russia	Avgoustina Stylianou; Cyprus

== Karate1 Premier League - Brazil 2015 ==
The Karate 1 Premier League – Brazil 2015 was held on 30–31 May 2015 at Avenida Kennedy, 1155 - Anchieta, São Paulo, Brazil.

=== Men ===
Event	Gold	Silver	Bronze
Individual kata	Leong Tze Wai; Malaysia	Marcos Sa; Brazil	Armin Roushanioskouei; Iran
Individual kata	Leong Tze Wai; Malaysia	Marcos Sa; Brazil	Williames Souza Santos; Brazil
Team kata	Brazil; Frederico da Silva Rocha; Eric Nascimento; Williames Souza Santos	Brazil; Willian Junior Barbosa; Fabrice Chiron; Luiz Inacio de Lima Junior	Brazil; Arthur Casadei; Lucas Tadeu Rodriguez; Daniel Yamaoka
Team kata	Brazil; Frederico da Silva Rocha; Eric Nascimento; Williames Souza Santos	Brazil; Willian Junior Barbosa; Fabrice Chiron; Luiz Inacio de Lima Junior	Brazil; Lucas Inocencio; Estevao Silva; Christian Tavares
Kumite -60 kg	Douglas Brose; Brazil	Andres Rendon Llanos; Colombia	Edemilson dos Santos; Brazil
Kumite -60 kg	Douglas Brose; Brazil	Andres Rendon Llanos; Colombia	Alerrandro de Sousa; Brazil
Kumite -67 kg	Luiz Victor da Rocha Barros; Brazil	Deivis Ferreras; Dominican Republic	Vinicius Figueira; Brazil
Kumite -67 kg	Luiz Victor da Rocha Barros; Brazil	Deivis Ferreras; Dominican Republic	Breno Teixeira; Brazil
Kumite -75 kg	Thomas Scott; United States	Juan Felipe Landazury Avenia; Colombia	Franco Icasati; Argentina
Kumite -75 kg	Thomas Scott; United States	Juan Felipe Landazury Avenia; Colombia	Patrice Boily-Martineau; Canada
Kumite -84 kg	Jorge Merino; El Salvador	Julio Cezar da Silva; Brazil	Alberto Azevedo; Brazil
Kumite -84 kg	Jorge Merino; El Salvador	Julio Cezar da Silva; Brazil	Jorge Perez; Dominican Republic
Kumite +84 kg	Franco Recouso; Argentina	Anel Castillo; Dominican Republic	Wellington Barbosa; Brazil
Kumite +84 kg	Franco Recouso; Argentina	Anel Castillo; Dominican Republic	Alejandro Mellado; Chile

=== Women ===
Event	Gold	Silver	Bronze
Individual kata	Sandra Sánchez Jaime; United Arab Emirates	Maria Dimitrova; Dominican Republic	Suany Guadalupe; Ecuador
Individual kata	Sandra Sánchez Jaime; United Arab Emirates	Maria Dimitrova; Dominican Republic	Thainan Schopchaki; Brazil
Team kata	Brazil; Noelle Felipe; Nicole Mota; Bruna Peterossi Martins	Brazil; Jessica Cristina Luebke; Julia Kruger; Gabriela Elias da Silva	
Kumite -50 kg	Ana Josefa Villanueva; Dominican Republic	Gabriela Bruna; Chile	Vanessa Araujo Campos; Brazil
Kumite -50 kg	Ana Josefa Villanueva; Dominican Republic	Gabriela Bruna; Chile	Yamaika Kuijper; Netherlands
Kumite -55 kg	Valéria Kumizaki; Brazil	Jacqueline Factos; Ecuador	Constanza Paredes; Chile
Kumite -55 kg	Valéria Kumizaki; Brazil	Jacqueline Factos; Ecuador	Julia Piccinini Hort; Brazil
Kumite -61 kg	Kamille Desjardins; Canada	Javiera Gonzalez; Chile	Alexandra Grande; Peru
Kumite -61 kg	Kamille Desjardins; Canada	Javiera Gonzalez; Chile	Stephani de Lima; Brazil
Kumite -68 kg	Carmen Harrigan; Dominican Republic	Susana Li; Chile	Valeria Echever; Ecuador
Kumite -68 kg	Carmen Harrigan; Dominican Republic	Susana Li; Chile	Ana Luiza da Silva; Brazil
Kumite +68 kg	Fernanda Pacheco; Brazil	Faten Aissa; Tunisia	Marina Oliva; Brazil
Kumite +68 kg	Fernanda Pacheco; Brazil	Faten Aissa; Tunisia	Camelie Boisvenue; Canada

== Karate1 Premier League - Istanbul 2015 ==
The Karate 1 Premier League – Istanbul 2015 was held on 5–6 September 2015 in Istanbul, Turkey.

=== Men ===
Event	Gold	Silver	Bronze
Individual kata	Ali Sofuoglu; Turkey	William Geoffray; France	Cengizhan Koca; Turkey
Individual kata	Ali Sofuoglu; Turkey	William Geoffray; France	Emre Vefa Goktas; Turkey
Team kata	Egypt; Ali Elkoumy; Youssef Hammad; Kamal Kassem	Iran; Faraz Tayefeh Najjaran; Mahdi Haghnazari; Sahand Eslami	Turkey; Yusuf Yagiz Ucebakan; Cengizhan Koca; Emre Vefa Goktas
Team kata	Egypt; Ali Elkoumy; Youssef Hammad; Kamal Kassem	Iran; Faraz Tayefeh Najjaran; Mahdi Haghnazari; Sahand Eslami	Algeria; Islam Djaafar; Hichem Nemla; Mohamed Ouchene
Kumite -60 kg	Angelo Crescenzo; Italy	Eyup Guler; Turkey	Vitalii Sementsov; Ukraine
Kumite -60 kg	Angelo Crescenzo; Italy	Eyup Guler; Turkey	Evgeny Plakhutin; Russia
Kumite -67 kg	Burak Uygur; Turkey	Omar Hegazy; Egypt	Muhammet Aly Yilmaz; Turkey
Kumite -67 kg	Burak Uygur; Turkey	Omar Hegazy; Egypt	Omer Kemaloglu; Turkey
Kumite -75 kg	Henri Vekua; Georgia	Sabir Ahmet Uygur; Turkey	Matus Lieskovsky; Slovakia
Kumite -75 kg	Henri Vekua; Georgia	Sabir Ahmet Uygur; Turkey	Ivo Cvetkovski; North Macedonia
Kumite -84 kg	Aykut Usda; Turkey	Berat Jakupi; North Macedonia	Gogita Arkania; Georgia
Kumite -84 kg	Aykut Usda; Turkey	Berat Jakupi; North Macedonia	Ugur Aktas; Turkey
Kumite +84 kg	Ridvan Kaptan; Turkey	Valentino Fioravante; Italy	Vasilii Antokhii; Russia
Kumite +84 kg	Ridvan Kaptan; Turkey	Valentino Fioravante; Italy	Andrei Grinevich; Belarus

=== Women ===
Event	Gold	Silver	Bronze
Individual kata	Sandra Sánchez; Spain	Sandy Scordo; France	Alexandra Feracci; France
Individual kata	Sandra Sánchez; Spain	Sandy Scordo; France	Dilara Bozan; Turkey
Team kata	North Macedonia; Marijana Dimoska; Misela Dimoska; Puleksenija Jovanoska	Turkey; Dilara Bozan; Rabia Kusmus; Gizem Sahin	Iran; Mahnaz Akhoundzadehkouhi; Parvaneh Ghasemi; Soudabeh Ghasemi
Team kata	North Macedonia; Marijana Dimoska; Misela Dimoska; Puleksenija Jovanoska	Turkey; Dilara Bozan; Rabia Kusmus; Gizem Sahin	Iran; Roya Akrami; Leila Khani Ebrahim Abadi; Hadiseh Lashgari
Kumite -50 kg	Serap Ozcelik; Turkey	Bahar Erseker; Turkey	Mai Elattar; Egypt
Kumite -50 kg	Serap Ozcelik; Turkey	Bahar Erseker; Turkey	Bettina Plank; Austria
Kumite -55 kg	Busra Tosun; Turkey	Cristina Ferrer Garcia; Spain	Zohreh Barzegarvaskasi; Iran
Kumite -55 kg	Busra Tosun; Turkey	Cristina Ferrer Garcia; Spain	Valéria Kumizaki; Brazil
Kumite -61 kg	Merve Coban; Turkey	Ingrida Suchankova; Slovakia	Aleyna Sezer; Turkey
Kumite -61 kg	Merve Coban; Turkey	Ingrida Suchankova; Slovakia	Emma Aronen; Finland
Kumite -68 kg	Iryna Zaretska; Azerbaijan	Viktorija Rezajeva; Latvia	Titta Keinanen; Finland
Kumite -68 kg	Iryna Zaretska; Azerbaijan	Viktorija Rezajeva; Latvia	Hafsa Seyda Burucu; Turkey
Kumite +68 kg	Meltem Hocaoglu; Turkey	Nathalie Reiter; Austria	Ivanna Zaytseva; Russia
Kumite +68 kg	Meltem Hocaoglu; Turkey	Nathalie Reiter; Austria	Fanny Clavien; Switzerland

== Karate1 Premier League - Coburg 2015 ==
The Karate 1 Premier League – Coburg 2015 was held on 26–27 September 2015 at Oudenaarder Strasse 1, 96450 Coburg, Germany.

=== Men ===
Event	Gold	Silver	Bronze
Individual kata	Ilja Smorguner; Germany	Damian Hugo; United Arab Emirates	Paul Baum; Germany
Individual kata	Ilja Smorguner; Germany	Damian Hugo; United Arab Emirates	David Felipe Contreras; Colombia
Team kata	Hong Kong; Hau Chun; Cheng Tsz Man Chris; Hung Ho Wai Howard	Germany; Marcel Schmitt; Philip Jüttner; Paul Baum	Austria; Benjamin Rath; Jan Luca Struger; Patrick Valet
Team kata	Hong Kong; Hau Chun; Cheng Tsz Man Chris; Hung Ho Wai Howard	Germany; Marcel Schmitt; Philip Jüttner; Paul Baum	Germany; Jonas Glaser; Joshua Spannaus; Jan Urke
Kumite -60 kg	Dome Szegedi; Hungary	Sofiane Agoudjil; France	David Tkebuchava; Georgia
Kumite -60 kg	Dome Szegedi; Hungary	Sofiane Agoudjil; France	Evgeny Plakhutin; Russia
Kumite -67 kg	Steven Da Costa; France	Kujtim Bajrami; Switzerland	Yves Martial Tadissi; Hungary
Kumite -67 kg	Steven Da Costa; France	Kujtim Bajrami; Switzerland	Tome Todorovski; North Macedonia
Kumite -75 kg	Gabor Harspataki; Hungary	Corentin Seguy; France	Matus Lieskovsky; Slovakia
Kumite -75 kg	Gabor Harspataki; Hungary	Corentin Seguy; France	Julien Caffaro; France
Kumite -84 kg	Noah Bitsch; Germany	Abdou Lahad Cisse; France	Meris Muhovic; Bosnia and Herzegovina
Kumite -84 kg	Noah Bitsch; Germany	Abdou Lahad Cisse; France	Nuno Moreira; France
Kumite +84 kg	Lonni Boulesnane; France	Tyron-Darnell Lardy; Netherlands	Calum Robb; England
Kumite +84 kg	Lonni Boulesnane; France	Tyron-Darnell Lardy; Netherlands	Salim Bendiab; France

=== Women ===
Event	Gold	Silver	Bronze
Individual kata	Grace Lau Mo Sheung; Hong Kong	Maria Dimitrova; Dominican Republic	Alexandra Feracci; France
Individual kata	Grace Lau Mo Sheung; Hong Kong	Maria Dimitrova; Dominican Republic	Sandra Sánchez Jaime; United Arab Emirates
Team kata	Germany; Jasmin Bleul; Christine Heinrich; Sophie Wachter	Slovakia; Ludmila Bacikova; Ema Brazdova; Nikoleta Merasicka	Sweden; Joanna Hogstrom; Alexandra Lowenadler; Lina Waglund
Team kata	Germany; Jasmin Bleul; Christine Heinrich; Sophie Wachter	Slovakia; Ludmila Bacikova; Ema Brazdova; Nikoleta Merasicka	Germany; Susanne Beinvogl; Fabienne Dyroff; Lisa Kirchner
Kumite -50 kg	Mariya Koulinkovitch; Belarus	Eva Rossner; Germany	Alexandra Recchia; France
Kumite -50 kg	Mariya Koulinkovitch; Belarus	Eva Rossner; Germany	Kateryna Kryva; Ukraine
Kumite -55 kg	Anzhelika Terliuga; Ukraine	Ma Man Sum; Hong Kong	Viktoria Semanikova; Slovakia
Kumite -55 kg	Anzhelika Terliuga; Ukraine	Ma Man Sum; Hong Kong	Valéria Kumizaki; Brazil
Kumite -61 kg	Lucie Ignace; France	Anita Serogina; Ukraine	Ingrida Suchankova; Slovakia
Kumite -61 kg	Lucie Ignace; France	Anita Serogina; Ukraine	Sanja Cvrkota; Serbia
Kumite -68 kg	Lucile Breton; France	Elena Quirici; Switzerland	Lamya Matoub; France
Kumite -68 kg	Lucile Breton; France	Elena Quirici; Switzerland	Riana Loffel; Australia
Kumite +68 kg	Vera Kovaleva; Russia	Vanesca Nortan; Netherlands	Anne-Laure Florentin; France
Kumite +68 kg	Vera Kovaleva; Russia	Vanesca Nortan; Netherlands	Nadege Ait Ibrahim; France

== Karate1 Premier League - Salzburg 2015 ==
The Karate 1 Premier League – Salzburg 2015 was held on 17–18 October 2015 in Salzburg, Austria.

=== Men ===
Event	Gold	Silver	Bronze
Individual kata	Damian Quintero; United Arab Emirates	Vu Duc Minh Dack; France	Gabriele Petroni; Italy
Individual kata	Damian Quintero; United Arab Emirates	Vu Duc Minh Dack; France	Peter Fabian; Slovakia
Team kata	Kuwait; Saied Salman Abdulhusain; Sayed Mohammad Abdulhusain; Mohammad Husain	Hong Kong; Cheng Tsz Man Chris; Hau Chun; Hung Ho Wai Howard	Peru; Roberto Atunca; Klaus Hurtado; Carlos Lam
Team kata	Kuwait; Saied Salman Abdulhusain; Sayed Mohammad Abdulhusain; Mohammad Husain	Hong Kong; Cheng Tsz Man Chris; Hau Chun; Hung Ho Wai Howard	Austria; Christoph Buchinger; Lukas Buchinger; Vincent Forster
Kumite -60 kg	Johan Lopes; France	Shohei Toyama; Japan	David Tkebuchava; Georgia
Kumite -60 kg	Johan Lopes; France	Shohei Toyama; Japan	Angelo Crescenzo; Italy
Kumite -67 kg	Luca Rettenbacher; Austria	Steven Da Costa; France	Stefan Joksic; Serbia
Kumite -67 kg	Luca Rettenbacher; Austria	Steven Da Costa; France	Hiroto Shinohara; Japan
Kumite -75 kg	Serkan Yagci; United Arab Emirates	Thomas Scott; United States	Gabor Harspataki; Hungary
Kumite -75 kg	Serkan Yagci; United Arab Emirates	Thomas Scott; United States	Michele Martina; Italy
Kumite -84 kg	Ivan Kvesic; Croatia	Alvin Karaqi; Kosovo	Ryutaro Araga; Japan
Kumite -84 kg	Ivan Kvesic; Croatia	Alvin Karaqi; Kosovo	Nuno Moreira; France
Kumite +84 kg	Ivan Zoricic; Croatia	Haris Sujkovic; Bosnia and Herzegovina	Andrei Grinevich; Belarus
Kumite +84 kg	Ivan Zoricic; Croatia	Haris Sujkovic; Bosnia and Herzegovina	Filipe Reis; France

=== Women ===
Event	Gold	Silver	Bronze
Individual kata	Sandra Sánchez Jaime; United Arab Emirates	Viviana Bottaro; Italy	Sandy Scordo; France
Individual kata	Sandra Sánchez Jaime; United Arab Emirates	Viviana Bottaro; Italy	Emiko Kawasaki; Japan
Team kata	Italy; Sara Battaglia; Viviana Bottaro; Michela Pezzetti	France; Alexandra Feracci; Laetitia Feracci; Emeline Joujou	Serbia; Jelena Lekovic; Vanja Savevski; Bojana Mladezic
Team kata	Italy; Sara Battaglia; Viviana Bottaro; Michela Pezzetti	France; Alexandra Feracci; Laetitia Feracci; Emeline Joujou	France; Lila Bui; Marie Bui; Sandy Scordo
Kumite -50 kg	Alexandra Recchia; France	Tsang Yee Ting; Hong Kong	Sophia Bouderbane; France
Kumite -50 kg	Alexandra Recchia; France	Tsang Yee Ting; Hong Kong	Kateryna Kryva; Ukraine
Kumite -55 kg	Syakilla Salni Jefry Krishnan; Malaysia	Ma Man Sum; Hong Kong	Andrea Brito; France
Kumite -55 kg	Syakilla Salni Jefry Krishnan; Malaysia	Ma Man Sum; Hong Kong	Valéria Kumizaki; Brazil
Kumite -61 kg	Laura Pasqua; Italy	Lucie Ignace; France	Miroslava Kopunova; Slovakia
Kumite -61 kg	Laura Pasqua; Italy	Lucie Ignace; France	Natasha Stefanovska; North Macedonia
Kumite -68 kg	Alizée Agier; France	Gitte Brunstad; Norway	Elena Quirici; Switzerland
Kumite -68 kg	Alizée Agier; France	Gitte Brunstad; Norway	Imane Hassouni; France
Kumite +68 kg	Anne-Laure Florentin; France	Vera Kovaleva; Russia	Masa Martinovic; Croatia
Kumite +68 kg	Anne-Laure Florentin; France	Vera Kovaleva; Russia	Nadege Ait Ibrahim; France

== Karate1 Premier League - Okinawa ==
The Karate 1 Premier League – Okinawa 2015 was held on 28–29 November 2015 in Okinawa, Japan.

=== Men ===
Event	Gold	Silver	Bronze
Individual kata	Ryo Kiyuna; Japan	Issei Shimbaba; Japan	Damian Quintero; United Arab Emirates
Individual kata	Ryo Kiyuna; Japan	Issei Shimbaba; Japan	Arata Kinjo; Japan
Team kata	Japan; Arata Kinjo; Ryo Kiyuna; Takuya Uemura	Japan; Chikashi Hayashida; Kazumasa Moto; Keita Nishihara	United States; Diego DiGiovanni; Andrew Watson; Charles Watson
Team kata	Japan; Arata Kinjo; Ryo Kiyuna; Takuya Uemura	Japan; Chikashi Hayashida; Kazumasa Moto; Keita Nishihara	Peru; Oliver del Castillo; Jimmy Moreno; Jhon Trebejo
Kumite -60 kg	Eiki Onishi; Japan	Shohei Toyama; Japan	Taihei Hanaguruma; Japan
Kumite -60 kg	Eiki Onishi; Japan	Shohei Toyama; Japan	Imam Tauhid Ragananda; Indonesia
Kumite -67 kg	Vinicius Figueira; Brazil	Tang Wei-Chieh; Chinese Taipei	Hiroto Shinohara; Japan
Kumite -67 kg	Vinicius Figueira; Brazil	Tang Wei-Chieh; Chinese Taipei	Yves Martial Tadissi; Hungary
Kumite -75 kg	Daisuke Watanabe; Japan	Ken Nishimura; Japan	Thomas Scott; United States
Kumite -75 kg	Daisuke Watanabe; Japan	Ken Nishimura; Japan	Hiroki Higa; Japan
Kumite -84 kg	Ryutaro Araga; Japan	Zabiollah Pourshab; Iran	Koki Kamaguchi; Japan
Kumite -84 kg	Ryutaro Araga; Japan	Zabiollah Pourshab; Iran	Noah Bitsch; Germany
Kumite +84 kg	Sajad Ganjzadeh; Iran	Shahin Atamov; Azerbaijan	Shintaro Kuniyoshi; Japan
Kumite +84 kg	Sajad Ganjzadeh; Iran	Shahin Atamov; Azerbaijan	Troy Futter; South Africa

=== Women ===
Event	Gold	Silver	Bronze
Individual kata	Kiyou Shimizu; Japan	Sandra Sánchez Jaime; United Arab Emirates	Mako Teruya; Japan
Individual kata	Kiyou Shimizu; Japan	Sandra Sánchez Jaime; United Arab Emirates	Emiri Iwamoto; Japan
Kumite -50 kg	Ayaka Tadano; Japan	Bettina Plank; Austria	Li Ranran; China
Kumite -50 kg	Ayaka Tadano; Japan	Bettina Plank; Austria	Miho Miyahara; Japan
Kumite -55 kg	Valéria Kumizaki; Brazil	Wen Tzu-yun; Chinese Taipei	Sara Yamada; Japan
Kumite -55 kg	Valéria Kumizaki; Brazil	Wen Tzu-yun; Chinese Taipei	Viktoria Semanikova; Slovakia
Kumite -61 kg	Mayumi Someya; Japan	Yin Xiaoyan; China	Maike Machado de Oliveira; Brazil
Kumite -61 kg	Mayumi Someya; Japan	Yin Xiaoyan; China	Ayami Moriguchi; Japan
Kumite -68 kg	Alisa Buchinger; Austria	Kayo Someya; Japan	Inga Sherozia; Russia
Kumite -68 kg	Alisa Buchinger; Austria	Kayo Someya; Japan	Tang Lingling; China
Kumite +68 kg	Natsumi Kawamura; Japan	Ayumi Uekusa; Japan	Gao Mengmeng; China
Kumite +68 kg	Natsumi Kawamura; Japan	Ayumi Uekusa; Japan	Vera Kovaleva; Russia
