= 2014 Karate1 Premier League =

The Karate 1 – Premier League 2014 is a series of international karate competitions organized by the World Karate Federation (WKF) during the year 2014. The series includes several stages of the Premier League circuit and concludes with the Grand Final event. It features top-level karate athletes from around the world competing in kata and kumite events.

This series is considered one of the most important in international karate, contributing to the global ranking of athletes.

== Events ==
Karate 1 – Premier League 2014
| Stages | Date | Series | City | Country |
|---|---|---|---|---|
| 1 | 11–12 January 2014 | Premier League – Paris | Paris | France |
| 2 | 8–9 March 2014 | Premier League – Almere (Dutch Open) | Almere | Netherlands |
| 3 | 15–16 March 2014 | World Cup – Laško | Laško | Slovenia |
| 4 | 20–21 June 2014 | Premier League – Jakarta | Jakarta | Indonesia |
| 5 | 30 –31 August 2014 | Premier League – Okinawa | Okinawa | Japan |
| 6 | 6–7 September 2014 | Premier League – Istanbul | Istanbul | Turkey |
| 7 | 27–28 September 2014 | Premier League – Hanau | Hanau | Germany |
| 8 | 11–12 October 2014 | Premier League – Grand Final | Salzburg | Austria |

== Karate1 Premier League - Paris 2014 ==
The Karate 1 Premier League – Paris 2014 was held on 10–12 January 2014 in Paris, France.

=== Men ===
| Event | Gold | Silver | Bronze |
|---|---|---|---|
| Individual kata | Issei Shimbaba; Japan | Damián Quintero; Spain | Itaru Oki; Japan |
| Individual kata | Issei Shimbaba; Japan | Damián Quintero; Spain | Vu Duc Minh Dack; France |
| Team kata | France; Lucas Jeannot; Geoffroy Monin; Ahmed Zemouri | Venezuela; Luis Contreras; Jorge Martinez; Jean Carlos Vasquez | Spain; Daniel Otero-Maydeu; Óscar Otero-Maydeu; Oscar Ramirez |
| Team kata | France; Lucas Jeannot; Geoffroy Monin; Ahmed Zemouri | Venezuela; Luis Contreras; Jorge Martinez; Jean Carlos Vasquez | Austria; Simon Klausberger; Thomas Kaserer; Christoph Erlenwein |
| Kumite -60 kg | Sofiane Agoudjil; France | El Mehdi Benrouida; Morocco | Kevin Azouz; France |
| Kumite -60 kg | Sofiane Agoudjil; France | El Mehdi Benrouida; Morocco | Luca Maresca; Italy |
| Kumite -67 kg | Döme Szegedi; Hungary | Andres Madera; Venezuela | Niyazi Aliyev; Azerbaijan |
| Kumite -67 kg | Döme Szegedi; Hungary | Andres Madera; Venezuela | Ali Elsawy; Egypt |
| Kumite -75 kg | Stanislav Horuna; Ukraine | Ahmed Mohamed; Egypt | Ruslans Sadikovs; Latvia |
| Kumite -75 kg | Stanislav Horuna; Ukraine | Ahmed Mohamed; Egypt | Yassine Elouarga; Morocco |
| Kumite -84 kg | Georgios Tzanos; Greece | Timothy Petersen; Netherlands | Milos Jovanovic; Serbia |
| Kumite -84 kg | Georgios Tzanos; Greece | Timothy Petersen; Netherlands | Aykhan Mamayev; Azerbaijan |
| Kumite +84 kg | Zharko Arsovski; North Macedonia | Franklin Mina; Ecuador | Nadir Benaissa; France |
| Kumite +84 kg | Zharko Arsovski; North Macedonia | Franklin Mina; Ecuador | Asiman Gurbanli; Azerbaijan |

=== Women ===
| Event | Gold | Silver | Bronze |
|---|---|---|---|
| Individual kata | Sandy Scordo; France | Emiri Iwamoto; Japan | Sandra Sánchez; Spain |
| Individual kata | Sandy Scordo; France | Emiri Iwamoto; Japan | Sarah Sayed; Egypt |
| Team kata | Belarus; Anastasiya Chuprys; Nadzeya Herashchanka; Sviatlana Yermakova | France; Marie Chaboisseau; Claire Delhumeau; Aurelie Pelatan | Venezuela; Laura Jorgensen; Glorianny Rondon; Geris Vizcaya |
| Kumite -50 kg | Alexandra Recchia; France | Lucia Kovacikova; Slovakia | Gulsah Akdag; Sweden |
| Kumite -50 kg | Alexandra Recchia; France | Lucia Kovacikova; Slovakia | Aurimar Campos; Venezuela |
| Kumite -55 kg | Miki Kobayashi; Japan | Sara Cardin; Italy | Tuba Yakan; Turkey |
| Kumite -55 kg | Miki Kobayashi; Japan | Sara Cardin; Italy | Valeria Kumizaki; Brazil |
| Kumite -61 kg | Magatte Seck; France | Randa Rousfelt; Egypt | Daniela Suarez; Venezuela |
| Kumite -61 kg | Magatte Seck; France | Randa Rousfelt; Egypt | Lolita Dona; France |
| Kumite -68 kg | Sonia Fromager; France | Alizée Agier; France | Kayo Someya; Japan |
| Kumite -68 kg | Sonia Fromager; France | Alizée Agier; France | Natalia Brozulatto; Brazil |
| Kumite +68 kg | Nadège Ait Ibrahim; France | Ayumi Uekusa; Japan | Anne-Laure Florentin; France |
| Kumite +68 kg | Nadège Ait Ibrahim; France | Ayumi Uekusa; Japan | Meltem Hocaoglu; Turkey |

== Karate1 Premier League - Almere 2014 ==
The Karate 1 Premier League – Dutch Open Almere 2014 was held on 8–9 March 2014 in Almere, Netherlands.

=== Men ===
| Event | Gold | Silver | Bronze |
|---|---|---|---|
| Individual kata | Vu Duc Minh Dack; France | Jorge Martinez; Venezuela | Damián Quintero; Spain |
| Individual kata | Vu Duc Minh Dack; France | Jorge Martinez; Venezuela | Jonathan Mottram; England |
| Team kata | Spain; José Manuel Carbonell López; Damián Quintero; Francisco José Salazar Jover | Italy; Mattia Busato; Alessandro Iodice; Alfredo Tocco | Germany; Jan Urke; Philip Juettner; Florian Genau |
| Team kata | Spain; José Manuel Carbonell López; Damián Quintero; Francisco José Salazar Jover | Italy; Mattia Busato; Alessandro Iodice; Alfredo Tocco | Croatia; Ivan Ermenc; Franjo Maskarin; Damjan Padovan |
| Kumite -60 kg | Amir Mehdizadeh; Iran | Luca Maresca; Italy | Oleg Filipovych; Ukraine |
| Kumite -60 kg | Amir Mehdizadeh; Iran | Luca Maresca; Italy | Amir Munzuk; Russia |
| Kumite -67 kg | Redouan Kousseksou; Morocco | Stefan Pokorny; Austria | Gianluca De Vivo; Italy |
| Kumite -67 kg | Redouan Kousseksou; Morocco | Stefan Pokorny; Austria | Yves Martial Tadissi; Hungary |
| Kumite -75 kg | Serkan Yağcı; Turkey | Stanislav Horuna; Ukraine | Luigi Busà; Italy |
| Kumite -75 kg | Serkan Yağcı; Turkey | Stanislav Horuna; Ukraine | René Smaal; Netherlands |
| Kumite -84 kg | Gogita Arkania; Georgia | Berat Jakupi; North Macedonia | Nello Maestri; Italy |
| Kumite -84 kg | Gogita Arkania; Georgia | Berat Jakupi; North Macedonia | Aleksandar Šestakov; Serbia |
| Kumite +84 kg | Enes Erkan; Turkey | Rıdvan Kaptan; Turkey | Stefano Maniscalco; Italy |
| Kumite +84 kg | Enes Erkan; Turkey | Rıdvan Kaptan; Turkey | Mario Vučić; Croatia |

=== Women ===
| Event | Gold | Silver | Bronze |
|---|---|---|---|
| Individual kata | Maria Dimitrova; Dominican Republic | Sandra Sánchez; Spain | Michela Pezzetti; Italy |
| Individual kata | Maria Dimitrova; Dominican Republic | Sandra Sánchez; Spain | Marija Madžarević; Serbia |
| Team kata | Belarus; Darya Rogovtsova; Maryia Fursava; Aliaksandra Fursava | Croatia; Marijana Kiuk; Vlatka Kiuk; Petra Krivičić | Germany; Jasmin Bleul; Christine Heinrich; Sophie Wachter |
| Team kata | Belarus; Darya Rogovtsova; Maryia Fursava; Aliaksandra Fursava | Croatia; Marijana Kiuk; Vlatka Kiuk; Petra Krivičić | France; Mélanie Fagot; Kelly Lopes; Asha Shokat |
| Kumite -50 kg | Alexandra Recchia; France | Serap Özçelik; Turkey | Kateryna Kryva; Ukraine |
| Kumite -50 kg | Alexandra Recchia; France | Serap Özçelik; Turkey | Bettina Plank; Austria |
| Kumite -55 kg | Émilie Thouy; France | Tuba Yakan; Turkey | Jana Bitsch; Germany |
| Kumite -55 kg | Émilie Thouy; France | Tuba Yakan; Turkey | Jana Vojtikevičová; Slovakia |
| Kumite -61 kg | Lucie Ignace; France | Lucile Breton; France | Anita Serogina; Ukraine |
| Kumite -61 kg | Lucie Ignace; France | Lucile Breton; France | Natalie Williams; England |
| Kumite -68 kg | Iryna Zaretska; United Arab Emirates | Chiara Zuanon; Italy | Merve Çoban; Turkey |
| Kumite -68 kg | Iryna Zaretska; United Arab Emirates | Chiara Zuanon; Italy | Maria Weiß; Germany |
| Kumite +68 kg | Fanny Clavien; Switzerland | Ciska van der Voort; Netherlands | Meltem Hocaoglu; Turkey |
| Kumite +68 kg | Fanny Clavien; Switzerland | Ciska van der Voort; Netherlands | Laura Pradelli; Belgium |

== Karate1 World Cup -Lasko 2014 ==
The Karate 1 World Cup – Laško 2014 was held on 15–16 March 2014 in Laško, Slovenia.

=== Men ===
| Event | Gold | Silver | Bronze |
|---|---|---|---|
| Individual kata | Lau Chi Ming; Hong Kong | Cheng Tsz Man Chris; Hong Kong | Mijat Vojvodić; Montenegro |
| Individual kata | Lau Chi Ming; Hong Kong | Cheng Tsz Man Chris; Hong Kong | Michal Toure; Slovakia |
| Kumite -60 kg | András Hübner; Hungary | Govinash Rajakumar; Malaysia | Emil Pavlov; North Macedonia |
| Kumite -60 kg | András Hübner; Hungary | Govinash Rajakumar; Malaysia | Marko Antić; Serbia |
| Kumite -67 kg | Sharmendran Raghonathan; Malaysia | Oleksandr Khakhula; Ukraine | Yves Martial Tadissi; Hungary |
| Kumite -67 kg | Sharmendran Raghonathan; Malaysia | Oleksandr Khakhula; Ukraine | Döme Szegedi; Hungary |
| Kumite -75 kg | Stanislav Horuna; Ukraine | Nikola Jovanović; Serbia | Goran Lucin; Croatia |
| Kumite -75 kg | Stanislav Horuna; Ukraine | Nikola Jovanović; Serbia | Valerii Chobotar; Ukraine |
| Kumite -84 kg | Illya Nikulin; Ukraine | Sadik Sadik; Bulgaria | Admir Dautović; Bosnia and Herzegovina |
| Kumite -84 kg | Illya Nikulin; Ukraine | Sadik Sadik; Bulgaria | Haris Škrijelj; Bosnia and Herzegovina |
| Kumite +84 kg | Almir Cecunjanin; Montenegro | Haris Jahič; Slovenia | Martin Nestorovski; North Macedonia |
| Kumite +84 kg | Almir Cecunjanin; Montenegro | Haris Jahič; Slovenia | Vasiliy Antokhii; Russia |
| Kumite Team | Ukraine; Sergii Bigun; Valerii Chobotar; Oleksandr Dozhuk; Stanislav Horuna; Yaroslav Horuna; Yevhen Motovylyn; Illya Nikulin | Croatia; Dejan Aleksic; Ivan Blazicevic; Marijan Logarusic; Ante Mrvicic; Domagoj Rukavec; Vinko Ursic-Glavanovic; Zvonimir Zivkovic | Bosnia and Herzegovina; Aldin Kiselica; Zulfo Kukuljac; Meris Muhović; Haris Škrijelj; Haris Sujković; Suad Tabaković |
| Kumite Team | Ukraine; Sergii Bigun; Valerii Chobotar; Oleksandr Dozhuk; Stanislav Horuna; Yaroslav Horuna; Yevhen Motovylyn; Illya Nikulin | Croatia; Dejan Aleksic; Ivan Blazicevic; Marijan Logarusic; Ante Mrvicic; Domagoj Rukavec; Vinko Ursic-Glavanovic; Zvonimir Zivkovic | Serbia; Nikola Jovanović; Miloš Jovanović; Slobodan Bitević; Uroš Mijalković; Aleksandar Šestakov; Ivan Stijović |

=== Women ===
| Event | Gold | Silver | Bronze |
|---|---|---|---|
| Individual kata | Terryana D'Onofrio; Italy | Marija Madžarević; Serbia | Francesca Reale; Italy |
| Individual kata | Terryana D'Onofrio; Italy | Marija Madžarević; Serbia | Puliksenija Jovanoska; North Macedonia |
| Kumite -50 kg | Bettina Plank; Austria | Nur Eleena Ab Malik; Malaysia | Isra Ou Aissa; Netherlands |
| Kumite -50 kg | Bettina Plank; Austria | Nur Eleena Ab Malik; Malaysia | Viktoria Semanikova; Slovakia |
| Kumite -55 kg | Sara Cardin; Italy | Jennifer Warling; Luxembourg | Alessandra Hasani; Italy |
| Kumite -55 kg | Sara Cardin; Italy | Jennifer Warling; Luxembourg | Nisha Alagasan; Malaysia |
| Kumite -61 kg | Anita Serogina; Ukraine | Shakila Salni Jefry Krishnan; Malaysia | Sanja Cvrkota; Serbia |
| Kumite -61 kg | Anita Serogina; Ukraine | Shakila Salni Jefry Krishnan; Malaysia | Maja Lenard; Croatia |
| Kumite -68 kg | Azra Sales; Croatia | Inga Sheroziya; Russia | Ivona Ćavar; Bosnia and Herzegovina |
| Kumite -68 kg | Azra Sales; Croatia | Inga Sheroziya; Russia | Marina Rakovic; Montenegro |
| Kumite +68 kg | Masa Martinovic; Croatia | Alessia Coppola-Neri; Italy | Dragana Konjevic; Montenegro |
| Kumite +68 kg | Masa Martinovic; Croatia | Alessia Coppola-Neri; Italy | Giulia Bernardi; Italy |
| Kumite Team | Ukraine; Kateryna Kryva; Zhanna Melnyk; Anita Serogina; Iryna Zaretska | Greece; Nicole Forcella; Vanesca Nortan; Vasiliki Panetsidou | Serbia; Danijela Milenkovic; Sanja Cvrkota; Ivana Comagic |
| Kumite Team | Ukraine; Kateryna Kryva; Zhanna Melnyk; Anita Serogina; Iryna Zaretska | Greece; Nicole Forcella; Vanesca Nortan; Vasiliki Panetsidou | Croatia; Ana-Marija Celan; Ana Lenard; Azra Sales; Ivona Tubic |

== Karate1 Premier League - Jakarta 2014 ==
The Karate 1 Premier League – Jakarta 2014 was held on 20–21 June 2014 in Jakarta, Indonesia.

=== Men ===
| Event | Gold | Silver | Bronze |
|---|---|---|---|
| Individual kata | Itaru Oki; Japan | Issei Shimbaba; Japan | Park Hee-jun; South Korea |
| Individual kata | Itaru Oki; Japan | Issei Shimbaba; Japan | Fidelys Lolobua; Indonesia |
| Team kata | Iran; Farzad Mohamad Khanloo; Armin Roushanioskouei; Ahad Shaahin | Indonesia; Fidelys Lolobua; Faizal Zainuddin; Aswar Aswar | Kuwait; Mohammad Alqattan; Sayed Mohammad Abdulhusain; Saied Salman Abdulhusain |
| Team kata | Iran; Farzad Mohamad Khanloo; Armin Roushanioskouei; Ahad Shaahin | Indonesia; Fidelys Lolobua; Faizal Zainuddin; Aswar Aswar | Indonesia; Andi Dasril Dwi Dharmawan; Andi Tomy Aditya Mardana; Aspar Sesasria |
| Kumite -60 kg | Hamoon Derafshipour; Iran | Vahid Hassanipour; Iran | Gu Ju-yeong; South Korea |
| Kumite -60 kg | Hamoon Derafshipour; Iran | Vahid Hassanipour; Iran | Lee Ji-hwan; South Korea |
| Kumite -67 kg | Hossein Samandarzavieh; Iran | Kim Do-won; South Korea | Tsuneari Yahiro; Australia |
| Kumite -67 kg | Hossein Samandarzavieh; Iran | Kim Do-won; South Korea | Ali Abdulaziz; Kuwait |
| Kumite -75 kg | Bahman Asgari Ghoncheh; Iran | Saeid Hassanipour; Iran | Park Jin-hyeok; South Korea |
| Kumite -75 kg | Bahman Asgari Ghoncheh; Iran | Saeid Hassanipour; Iran | Milton de Souza Menezes; Brazil |
| Kumite -84 kg | Mahdi Soltani Kalvanagh; Iran | Nguyen Minh Phung; Vietnam | Ryutaro Araga; Japan |
| Kumite -84 kg | Mahdi Soltani Kalvanagh; Iran | Nguyen Minh Phung; Vietnam | Jang Min-soo; South Korea |
| Kumite +84 kg | Iman Sanchouli; Iran | Angel Georgieff; Australia | Hadi Arab; Iran |
| Kumite +84 kg | Iman Sanchouli; Iran | Angel Georgieff; Australia | Peiman Soltanian; Iran |

=== Women ===
| Event | Gold | Silver | Bronze |
|---|---|---|---|
| Individual kata | Rimi Kajikawa; Japan | Nguyen Hoang Ngan; Vietnam | Sisilia Agustiani Ora; Indonesia |
| Individual kata | Rimi Kajikawa; Japan | Nguyen Hoang Ngan; Vietnam | Emiri Iwamoto; Japan |
| Kumite -50 kg | Jang So-young; South Korea | Alaleh Sooudi; Iran | Srunita Sari Sukatendel; Indonesia |
| Kumite -50 kg | Jang So-young; South Korea | Alaleh Sooudi; Iran | Tran Thi Khanh Vy; Vietnam |
| Kumite -55 kg | Miki Kobayashi; Japan | Tiara Puja Kusuma; Indonesia | Alexandra Gallo; Australia |
| Kumite -55 kg | Miki Kobayashi; Japan | Tiara Puja Kusuma; Indonesia | Shima Alesaadi; Iran |
| Kumite -61 kg | Valéria Kumizaki; Brazil | Mahtab Esmaeili; Iran | Bui Thi Ngoc Han; Vietnam |
| Kumite -61 kg | Valéria Kumizaki; Brazil | Mahtab Esmaeili; Iran | Taravat Khaksar; Iran |
| Kumite -68 kg | Pegah Zangeneh Karkooti; Iran | Vanesca Nortan; Netherlands | Behnoosh Najafi Ghaghelestani; Iran |
| Kumite -68 kg | Pegah Zangeneh Karkooti; Iran | Vanesca Nortan; Netherlands | Serlitha Palalangan; Indonesia |
| Kumite +68 kg | Ruth Soufflet; France | Michelle Wilson; Australia | Evgeniya Podborodnikova; Australia |
| Kumite +68 kg | Ruth Soufflet; France | Michelle Wilson; Australia | Cheon Han-na; South Korea |

== Karate1 Premier League - Okinawa 2014 ==
The Karate 1 Premier League – Okinawa 2014 was held on 30 August 2014 in Okinawa, Japan.

=== Men ===
| Event | Gold | Silver | Bronze |
|---|---|---|---|
| Individual kata | Ryo Kiyuna; Japan | Itaru Oki; Japan | Chikashi Hayashida; Japan |
| Individual kata | Ryo Kiyuna; Japan | Itaru Oki; Japan | Issei Shimbaba; Japan |
| Team kata | Japan; Arata Kinjo; Ryo Kiyuna; Takuya Uemura | Japan; Koji Arimoto; Takato Soma; Takumi Sugino | Mexico; Enrique Arturo Estrada Jimenez; Waldo Ramirez; Daniel Vargas |
| Team kata | Japan; Arata Kinjo; Ryo Kiyuna; Takuya Uemura | Japan; Koji Arimoto; Takato Soma; Takumi Sugino | Malaysia; Emmanuel Leong Theng Kuang; Leong Tze Wai; Thomson Hoe |
| Kumite -60 kg | Amir Mehdizadeh; Iran | Douglas Brose; Brazil | Suryadi Suryadi; Indonesia |
| Kumite -60 kg | Amir Mehdizadeh; Iran | Douglas Brose; Brazil | Shintaro Araga; Japan |
| Kumite -67 kg | Hiroto Shinohara; Japan | Hossein Samandarzavieh; Iran | Ömer Kemaloğlu; Turkey |
| Kumite -67 kg | Hiroto Shinohara; Japan | Hossein Samandarzavieh; Iran | Nguyen Van Nhat; Vietnam |
| Kumite -75 kg | Ryuichi Tani; Japan | Rikiya Iimura; Japan | Serkan Yağcı; Turkey |
| Kumite -75 kg | Ryuichi Tani; Japan | Rikiya Iimura; Japan | Ken Nishimura; Japan |
| Kumite -84 kg | Ryutaro Araga; Japan | Georgios Tzanos; Greece | Zabiollah Poorshab; Iran |
| Kumite -84 kg | Ryutaro Araga; Japan | Georgios Tzanos; Greece | Ali Fadakar; Iran |
| Kumite +84 kg | Iman Sanchouli; Iran | Enes Erkan; Turkey | Hideyoshi Kagawa; Japan |
| Kumite +84 kg | Iman Sanchouli; Iran | Enes Erkan; Turkey | Franco Recouso; Argentina |

=== Women ===
| Event | Gold | Silver | Bronze |
|---|---|---|---|
| Individual kata | Kiyou Shimizu; Japan | Rimi Kajikawa; Japan | Nguyen Hoang Ngan; Vietnam |
| Individual kata | Kiyou Shimizu; Japan | Rimi Kajikawa; Japan | Yoko Kimura; Japan |
| Team kata | Japan; Suzuka Kashioka; Yoko Kimura; Miku Morioka | Vietnam; Do Ha Mi; Do Thi Thu Ha; Nguyen Thi Hang | France; Ruveyda Akbolat; Sabah Brihmat; Claire Gandit |
| Team kata | Japan; Suzuka Kashioka; Yoko Kimura; Miku Morioka | Vietnam; Do Ha Mi; Do Thi Thu Ha; Nguyen Thi Hang | Mexico; Xhunashi Caballero; Cecilia Yaretzi Cuellar; Xatzi Y. Trujillo |
| Kumite -50 kg | Chinatsu Endo; Japan | Serap Özçelik; Turkey | Cecilia Yaretzi Cuellar; Mexico |
| Kumite -50 kg | Chinatsu Endo; Japan | Serap Özçelik; Turkey | Ku Tsui-Ping; Chinese Taipei |
| Kumite -55 kg | Miki Kobayashi; Japan | Tuba Yakan; Turkey | Jelena Kovačević; Croatia |
| Kumite -55 kg | Miki Kobayashi; Japan | Tuba Yakan; Turkey | Yuri Kaneko; Japan |
| Kumite -61 kg | Mayumi Someya; Japan | Fatemeh Chalaki; Iran | Natsuki Arakaki; Japan |
| Kumite -61 kg | Mayumi Someya; Japan | Fatemeh Chalaki; Iran | Merillela Arreola; Mexico |
| Kumite -68 kg | Pegah Zangeneh Karkooti; Iran | Merve Çoban; Turkey | Mai Shiina; Japan |
| Kumite -68 kg | Pegah Zangeneh Karkooti; Iran | Merve Çoban; Turkey | Tang Lingling; China |
| Kumite +68 kg | Nadège Ait Ibrahim; France | Ayumi Uekusa; Japan | Hamideh Abbasali; Iran |
| Kumite +68 kg | Nadège Ait Ibrahim; France | Ayumi Uekusa; Japan | Sena Higashi; Japan |

== Karate1 Premier League - Istanbul 2014 ==
The Karate 1 Premier League – Istanbul 2014 was held on 6–7 September 2014 in Istanbul, Turkey.

=== Men ===
| Event | Gold | Silver | Bronze |
|---|---|---|---|
| Individual kata | Ali Sofuoğlu; Turkey | Vu Duc Minh Dack; France | Ahmed Ashraf Shawky; Egypt |
| Individual kata | Ali Sofuoğlu; Turkey | Vu Duc Minh Dack; France | Lucas Jeannot; France |
| Team kata | Turkey; Orcun Duman; Arslan Çalışkan; Ali Sofuoğlu | Iran; Shaahin Ahad; Armin Roushanioskouei; Farzad Mohamad Khanloo | France; Vu Duc Minh Dack; William Geoffray; Remi Martorana |
| Team kata | Turkey; Orcun Duman; Arslan Çalışkan; Ali Sofuoğlu | Iran; Shaahin Ahad; Armin Roushanioskouei; Farzad Mohamad Khanloo | Egypt; Ahmed Ashraf Shawky; Mohamed Hamdy Sayed; Zeyad Mohamed |
| Kumite -60 kg | Luca Maresca; Italy | David Tkebuchava; Georgia | Mohamed Aly; Egypt |
| Kumite -60 kg | Luca Maresca; Italy | David Tkebuchava; Georgia | Vitali Sementsov; Ukraine |
| Kumite -67 kg | Saeid Ahmadi Karyani; Iran | Gianluca De Vivo; Italy | Rafiz Hasanov; Azerbaijan |
| Kumite -67 kg | Saeid Ahmadi Karyani; Iran | Gianluca De Vivo; Italy | Niyazi Aliyev; Azerbaijan |
| Kumite -75 kg | Serkan Yağcı; Turkey | Ahmed Solyman; Egypt | Bahman Asgari Ghoncheh; Iran |
| Kumite -75 kg | Serkan Yağcı; Turkey | Ahmed Solyman; Egypt | Daisuke Watanabe; Japan |
| Kumite -84 kg | Aykhan Mamayev; Azerbaijan | Abdalla Ibrahim; Egypt | Mohamed Elkotby; Egypt |
| Kumite -84 kg | Aykhan Mamayev; Azerbaijan | Abdalla Ibrahim; Egypt | Nello Maestri; Italy |
| Kumite +84 kg | Sajad Ganjzadeh; Iran | Enes Erkan; Turkey | Ahmed Elasfar; Egypt |
| Kumite +84 kg | Sajad Ganjzadeh; Iran | Enes Erkan; Turkey | Osama Mansour; Egypt |

=== Women ===
| Event | Gold | Silver | Bronze |
|---|---|---|---|
| Individual kata | Nguyen Hoang Ngan; Vietnam | Terryana D'Onofrio; Italy | Alexandra Feracci; France |
| Individual kata | Nguyen Hoang Ngan; Vietnam | Terryana D'Onofrio; Italy | Grace Lau Mo Sheung; Hong Kong |
| Team kata | Germany; Jasmin Bleul; Sophie Wachter; Christine Heinrich | Iran; Soudabeh Ghasemi; Parvaneh Ghasemi; Mahnaz Akhoundzadehkouhi | North Macedonia; Puliksenija Jovanoska; Misela Dimoska; Marijana Dimoska |
| Team kata | Germany; Jasmin Bleul; Sophie Wachter; Christine Heinrich | Iran; Soudabeh Ghasemi; Parvaneh Ghasemi; Mahnaz Akhoundzadehkouhi | Egypt; Shaimaa Mohamed Solyman; Mai Gamaleldin Salama; Randa Atef Abdelaziz |
| Kumite -50 kg | Serap Özçelik; Turkey | Areeg Said Rashed; Egypt | Roxanne Cote; Canada |
| Kumite -50 kg | Serap Özçelik; Turkey | Areeg Said Rashed; Egypt | Tsang Yee Ting; Hong Kong |
| Kumite -55 kg | Miki Kobayashi; Japan | Yassmin Attia; Egypt | Jennifer Warling; Luxembourg |
| Kumite -55 kg | Miki Kobayashi; Japan | Yassmin Attia; Egypt | Fatma Ehab Ahmed; Egypt |
| Kumite -61 kg | Nicole Forcella; Italy | Giana Mohamed Lotfy; Egypt | Anita Serogina; Ukraine |
| Kumite -61 kg | Nicole Forcella; Italy | Giana Mohamed Lotfy; Egypt | Nada Khamis Dagher; Egypt |
| Kumite -68 kg | Fatma Alzahraa Reda; Egypt | Alisa Buchinger; Austria | Kayo Someya; Japan |
| Kumite -68 kg | Fatma Alzahraa Reda; Egypt | Alisa Buchinger; Austria | Yasmine Gharib; Egypt |
| Kumite +68 kg | Aia Nabil Ibrahim; Egypt | Shaymaa Mohamed Alsayed; Egypt | Valeria Echever; Ecuador |
| Kumite +68 kg | Aia Nabil Ibrahim; Egypt | Shaymaa Mohamed Alsayed; Egypt | Hamideh Abbasali; Iran |

== Karate1 Premier League - Hanau 2014 ==
The Karate 1 Premier League – Hanau 2014 was held on 27 September 2014 in Hanau, Germany.

=== Men ===
| Event | Gold | Silver | Bronze |
|---|---|---|---|
| Individual kata | Antonio Díaz; Venezuela | Mattia Busato; Italy | Damián Quintero; Spain |
| Individual kata | Antonio Díaz; Venezuela | Mattia Busato; Italy | Vu Duc Minh Dack; France |
| Team kata | Spain; Francisco José Salazar Jover; Damián Quintero; José Manuel Carbonell López | France; Vu Duc Minh Dack; William Geoffray; Rémi Martorana | Germany; Florian Genau; Philip Juettner; Jan Urke |
| Team kata | Spain; Francisco José Salazar Jover; Damián Quintero; José Manuel Carbonell López | France; Vu Duc Minh Dack; William Geoffray; Rémi Martorana | Turkey; Arslan Çalışkan; Orçun Duman; Ali Sofuoğlu |
| Kumite -60 kg | Aykut Kaya; Turkey | Douglas Brose; Brazil | Kalvis Kalniņš; Latvia |
| Kumite -60 kg | Aykut Kaya; Turkey | Douglas Brose; Brazil | Evgeny Plakhutin; Russia |
| Kumite -67 kg | Guillermo Ramírez; Colombia | Vinicius Figueira; Brazil | Redouan Kousseksou; Morocco |
| Kumite -67 kg | Guillermo Ramírez; Colombia | Vinicius Figueira; Brazil | Thomas Kaserer; Austria |
| Kumite -75 kg | Rene Smaal; Netherlands | Luigi Busa; Italy | Noah Bitsch; Germany |
| Kumite -75 kg | Rene Smaal; Netherlands | Luigi Busa; Italy | Serkan Yağcı; Turkey |
| Kumite -84 kg | Berat Jakupi; North Macedonia | Alexander Aliev; Russia | Nello Maestri; Italy |
| Kumite -84 kg | Berat Jakupi; North Macedonia | Alexander Aliev; Russia | Miloš Jovanović; Serbia |
| Kumite +84 kg | Jonathan Horne; Germany | Salim Bendiab; France | Moreno Sheppard; Netherlands |
| Kumite +84 kg | Jonathan Horne; Germany | Salim Bendiab; France | Valentino Fioravanti; Italy |

=== Women ===
| Event | Gold | Silver | Bronze |
|---|---|---|---|
| Individual kata | Sandy Scordo; France | Terryana D'Onofrio; Italy | Yaiza Martín Abello; Spain |
| Individual kata | Sandy Scordo; France | Terryana D'Onofrio; Italy | Maria Dimitrova; Dominican Republic |
| Team kata | Italy; Sara Battaglia; Viviana Bottaro; Michela Pezzetti | Germany; Jasmin Bleul; Christine Heinrich; Sophie Wachter | France; Clotilde Boulanger; Lila Bui; Marie Bui |
| Team kata | Italy; Sara Battaglia; Viviana Bottaro; Michela Pezzetti | Germany; Jasmin Bleul; Christine Heinrich; Sophie Wachter | Belarus; Aliaksandra Fursava; Maryia Fursava; Darya Rogovtsova |
| Kumite -50 kg | Alexandra Recchia; France | Sophia Bouderbane; France | Linda Hagen; Germany |
| Kumite -50 kg | Alexandra Recchia; France | Sophia Bouderbane; France | Bettina Plank; Austria |
| Kumite -55 kg | Sara Cardin; Italy | Jana Bitsch; Germany | Valéria Kumizaki; Brazil |
| Kumite -55 kg | Sara Cardin; Italy | Jana Bitsch; Germany | Émilie Thouy; France |
| Kumite -61 kg | Lucie Ignace; France | Kristina Mah; Australia | Lucile Breton; France |
| Kumite -61 kg | Lucie Ignace; France | Kristina Mah; Australia | Lolita Dona; France |
| Kumite -68 kg | Inga Sherozia; Russia | Elena Quirici; Switzerland | Ivana Bebek; Croatia |
| Kumite -68 kg | Inga Sherozia; Russia | Elena Quirici; Switzerland | Cristina Vizcaíno González; Spain |
| Kumite +68 kg | Fanny Clavien; Switzerland | Laura Palacio González; Spain | Vera Kovaleva; Russia |
| Kumite +68 kg | Fanny Clavien; Switzerland | Laura Palacio González; Spain | Laura Pradelli; Belgium |

== Karate1 Premier League – Grand Final - Salzburg 2014 ==
The Karate 1 Premier League – Grand Final Salzburg 2014 was held on 11 October 2014 in Salzburg, Austria.

=== Men ===
| Event | Gold | Silver | Bronze |
|---|---|---|---|
| Individual kata | Mattia Busato; Italy | Damián Quintero; Spain | Vu Duc Minh Dack; France |
| Individual kata | Mattia Busato; Italy | Damián Quintero; Spain | Gabriele Petroni; Italy |
| Team kata | Morocco; Bilal Benkacem; Adnan El Hakimi; Mohammed El Hanni | Iran; Farzad Mohamad Khanloo; Armin Roushanioskouei; Shaahin Ahad | Spain; José Manuel Carbonell López; Damián Quintero; Francisco José Salazar Jover |
| Team kata | Morocco; Bilal Benkacem; Adnan El Hakimi; Mohammed El Hanni | Iran; Farzad Mohamad Khanloo; Armin Roushanioskouei; Shaahin Ahad | Croatia; Ivan Ermenc; Franjo Maskarin; Damjan Padovan |
| Kumite -60 kg | Kalvis Kalniņš; Latvia | Luca Maresca; Italy | Michele Giuliani; Italy |
| Kumite -60 kg | Kalvis Kalniņš; Latvia | Luca Maresca; Italy | Michael Dasoul; Belgium |
| Kumite -67 kg | Stefan Pokorny; Austria | Thomas Kaserer; Austria | Stefan Jokšić; Serbia |
| Kumite -67 kg | Stefan Pokorny; Austria | Thomas Kaserer; Austria | Artsiom Krautsou; Belarus |
| Kumite -75 kg | Ruslans Sadikovs; Latvia | Gabor Hárspataki; Hungary | Lee Ka Wai; Hong Kong |
| Kumite -75 kg | Ruslans Sadikovs; Latvia | Gabor Hárspataki; Hungary | Logan Da Costa; France |
| Kumite -84 kg | Timothy Petersen; Netherlands | Illya Nikulin; Ukraine | Juš Markač; Slovenia |
| Kumite -84 kg | Timothy Petersen; Netherlands | Illya Nikulin; Ukraine | Mickael Serfati; France |
| Kumite +84 kg | Jonathan Horne; Germany | Slobodan Bitevic; Serbia | Alex Creemers; Netherlands |
| Kumite +84 kg | Jonathan Horne; Germany | Slobodan Bitevic; Serbia | Sebastjan Budihna; Slovenia |

=== Women ===
| Event | Gold | Silver | Bronze |
|---|---|---|---|
| Individual kata | Yaiza Martín Abello; Spain | Marija Madžarević; Serbia | Maria Dimitrova; Dominican Republic |
| Individual kata | Yaiza Martín Abello; Spain | Marija Madžarević; Serbia | Saida Salcedo; Peru |
| Team kata | Serbia; Milana Jaksic; Ivana Stepanovic; Dunja Zeravic | Croatia; Vlatka Kiuk; Petra Krivičić; Mihaela Petrovic | Germany; Marina Albers; Marie-Susanne Beinvog; Lisa-Maria Kirchner |
| Team kata | Serbia; Milana Jaksic; Ivana Stepanovic; Dunja Zeravic | Croatia; Vlatka Kiuk; Petra Krivičić; Mihaela Petrovic | Peru; Ingrid Aranda; Sol Maria Romani; Saida Salcedo |
| Kumite -50 kg | Duygu Bugur; Germany | Nurane Aliyeva; Azerbaijan | Yee Ting Tsang; Hong Kong |
| Kumite -50 kg | Duygu Bugur; Germany | Nurane Aliyeva; Azerbaijan | Lucia Kovacikova; Slovakia |
| Kumite -55 kg | Sara Cardin; Italy | Jelena Kovačević; Croatia | Jana Bitsch; Germany |
| Kumite -55 kg | Sara Cardin; Italy | Jelena Kovačević; Croatia | Jennifer Warling; Luxembourg |
| Kumite -61 kg | Lucie Ignace; France | Lucile Breton; France | Sanja Cvrkota; Serbia |
| Kumite -61 kg | Lucie Ignace; France | Lucile Breton; France | Alexandra Grande; Peru |
| Kumite -68 kg | Alisa Buchinger; Austria | Elena Quirici; Switzerland | Cristina Vizcaíno González; Spain |
| Kumite -68 kg | Alisa Buchinger; Austria | Elena Quirici; Switzerland | Inga Sherozia; Russia |
| Kumite +68 kg | Vera Kovaleva; Russia | Masaa Martinovic; Croatia | Clio Ferracuti; Italy |
| Kumite +68 kg | Vera Kovaleva; Russia | Masaa Martinovic; Croatia | Helena Kuusisto; Finland |
