= Turkey at the 2017 World Games =

- IOC code: TUR

in Wrocław, Poland 20 July 2017 – 30 July 2017
- Competitors: 13
- Medals: Gold 2 Silver 1 Bronze 3 Total 6

World Games appearances
- 1981; 1985; 1989; 1993; 1997; 2001; 2005; 2009; 2013; 2017; 2022; 2025

Turkey competed at the 2017 World Games held in Wroclaw, Poland.

== Medalists ==
Medal	Name	Sport	Event	Day
Gold	Hamdi Saygılı	Kickboxing	Men's +91 kg	27 July
Gold	Ali Doğan	Muay Thai	Men's 81 kg	30 July
Silver	Seda Duygu Aygün	Kickboxing	Women's 56 kg	27 July
Bronze	Serap Özçelik	Karate	Women's kumite 50 kg	25 July
Bronze	Uğur Aktaş	Karate	Men's kumite 84 kg	26 July
Bronze	Meltem Baş	Muaythai	Women's 54 kg	30 July

== Cue sports ==
Athlete	Event	Round of 16	Quarterfinal	Semifinal	Final / BM	
Athlete	Event	Opposition Result	Opposition Result	Opposition Result	Opposition Result	Rank
Can Çapak	Men's 3-cushion carom	Leppens (BEL); L 28–40	Did not advance			

== Karate ==
Athlete	Event	Group stage				Semifinals	Final/Bronze medal bout	
Athlete	Event	Opposition Result	Opposition Result	Opposition Result	Rank	Opposition Result	Opposition Result	Rank
Uğur Aktaş	Men's kumite 84 kg	Pognon (FRA); W 5–2	Arkania (GEO); W 1–0	Pourshab (IRI); L 0–1	2 Q	Araga (JPN); L 1–6	Warda (POL); W 6–1	3rd place, bronze medalist(s)
Serap Özçelik	Women's kumite 50 kg	Plank (AUT); W 2–0	Recchia (FRA); D 0–0	Kryva (UKR); D 0–0	2 Q	Miyahara (JPN); L 0–4	Nowakowska (POL); W 2–0	3rd place, bronze medalist(s)

== Kickboxing ==
Athlete	Event	Quarterfinal	Semifinal	Final / BM	
Athlete	Event	Opposition Result	Opposition Result	Opposition Result	Rank
Burak Eymur	Men's 67 kg	Kazieczko (POL); L 0–3	Did not advance		5
Hamdi Saygılı	Men's +91 kg	Darkaoui (MAR); W WO	Turyński (POL); W WO	Inocente (BRA); W DQ	1st place, gold medalist(s)
Seda Duygu Aygün	Women's 56 kg	Alizadehsharafshadeh (IRI); W 3–0	Fiedler (AUT); W 2–1	Mašková (CZE); L 0–3	2nd place, silver medalist(s)

== Muaythai ==
Athlete	Event	Quarterfinal	Semifinal	Final / BM	
Athlete	Event	Opposition Result	Opposition Result	Opposition Result	Rank
Ali Doğan	Men's 81 kg	Salama (JOR); W 30–27	Korczak (POL); W 30–27	Nanga (SWE); W 29–28	1st place, gold medalist(s)
Serdar Yiğit Eroğlu	Men's 91 kg	Klauda (CZE); L 27–30	Did not advance		5
Meltem Baş	Women's 54 kg	Lyn (CAN); W 30–27	Drozdova (RUS); L 27–30	Tola (PER); W 30–27	3rd place, bronze medalist(s)
