= Karate at the 2017 World Games =

Karate competition

- Venue: GEM Sports Complex
- Location: Wrocław
- Dates: 25–26 July
- Competitors: 96 from 39 nations

The karate competition at the World Games 2017 took place from 25 to 26 July, in Wrocław in Poland, in the GEM Sports Complex. 96 sportsmen from 39 nations participated in the event.

It served as a qualifying event for the 2020 Summer Olympics in Tokyo.

== Schedule ==
All times are in Central European Summer Time (UTC+02:00).

Tuesday, 25 July 2017

- 10:00–15:00 Men's Kata, Kumite 60 kg, Kumite 67 kg, Women's Kata, Kumite 50 kg, Kumite 55 kg preliminaries and semifinals
- 17:00–19:00 Men's Kata, Kumite 60 kg, Kumite 67 kg, Women's Kata, Kumite 50 kg, Kumite 55 kg medal competitions

Wednesday, 26 July 2017

- 10:00–15:00 Men's Kumite 75 kg, Kumite 84 kg, Kumite +84 kg, Women's Kumite 61 kg, Kumite 68 kg, Kumite +68 kg preliminaries and semifinals
- 17:00–19:00 Men's Kumite 75 kg, Kumite 84 kg, Kumite +84 kg, Women's Kumite 61 kg, Kumite 68 kg, Kumite +68 kg medal competitions

== Participating nations ==
- Algeria (4)
- Argentina (1)
- Australia (4)
- Austria (2)
- Azerbaijan (2)
- Brazil (4)
- Chile (1)
- China (1)
- Chinese Taipei (1)
- Croatia (1)
- Denmark (1)
- Dominican Republic (2)
- Egypt (5)
- Fiji (1)
- France (10)
- (Georgia (country)) Georgia (1)
- Germany (2)
- (United Kingdom) Great Britain (1)
- Greece (1)
- Hungary (1)
- Iran (5)
- Italy (2)
- Japan (7)
- Kazakhstan (2)
- Montenegro (1)
- Morocco (1)
- Netherlands (1)
- New Zealand (2)
- Peru (2)
- Poland (11)
- Saudi Arabia (1)
- Senegal (1)
- Slovakia (2)
- Spain (3)
- Switzerland (1)
- Turkey (2)
- Ukraine (3)
- United States (3)
- Venezuela (2)

== Medalists ==
=== Kata ===
Event	Gold	Silver	Bronze
Men	Ryo Kiyuna; Japan	Damián Quintero; Spain	Antonio Díaz; Venezuela
Women	Kiyou Shimizu; Japan	Sandra Sánchez; Spain	Sandy Scordo; France

=== Men's kumite ===
Event	Gold	Silver	Bronze
60 kg	Firdovsi Farzaliyev; Azerbaijan	Amir Mehdizadeh; Iran	Matías Gómez; Spain
67 kg	Steven Da Costa; France	Jordan Thomas; Great Britain	Deivis Ferreras; Dominican Republic
75 kg	Stanislav Horuna; Ukraine	Ali Asghar Asiabari; Iran	Hernâni Veríssimo; Brazil
84 kg	Zabihollah Pourshab; Iran	Ryutaro Araga; Japan	Uğur Aktaş; Turkey
+84 kg	Hideyoshi Kagawa; Japan	Sajjad Ganjzadeh; Iran	Michał Bąbos; Poland

=== Women's kumite ===
Event	Gold	Silver	Bronze
50 kg	Alexandra Recchia; France	Miho Miyahara; Japan	Serap Özçelik; Turkey
55 kg	Valéria Kumizaki; Brazil	Wen Tzu-yun; Chinese Taipei	Sara Cardin; Italy
61 kg	Alexandra Grande; Peru	Anita Serogina; Ukraine	Ingrida Suchánková; Slovakia
68 kg	Lamya Matoub; Algeria	Alisa Buchinger; Austria	Kayo Someya; Japan
+68 kg	Ayumi Uekusa; Japan	Hamideh Abbasali; Iran	Anne-Laure Florentin; France

== Medals table ==
* Host nation (Poland)

Rank	Nation	Gold	Silver	Bronze	Total
1	Japan	4	2	1	7
2	France	2	0	2	4
3	Iran	1	4	0	5
4	Ukraine	1	1	0	2
5	Brazil	1	0	1	2
6	Algeria	1	0	0	1
6	Azerbaijan	1	0	0	1
6	Peru	1	0	0	1
9	Spain	0	2	1	3
10	Austria	0	1	0	1
10	Chinese Taipei	0	1	0	1
10	Great Britain	0	1	0	1
13	Turkey	0	0	2	2
14	Dominican Republic	0	0	1	1
14	Italy	0	0	1	1
14	Poland*	0	0	1	1
14	Slovakia	0	0	1	1
14	Venezuela	0	0	1	1
Totals (18 entries)		12	12	12	36
