= Karate at the 2017 World Games – Men's kumite 84 kg =

Men's Kumite 84kg at the 2017 World Games
- Venue: GEM Sports Complex
- Date: 26 July 2017
- Competitors: 8 from 8 nations

Medalists
| 1st place, gold medalist(s) | | (Iran) Zabihollah Pourshab |
| 2nd place, silver medalist(s) | | (Japan) Ryutaro Araga |
| 3rd place, bronze medalist(s) | | (Turkey) Uğur Aktaş |

The men's kumite 84 kg competition in karate at the 2017 World Games took place on 26 July 2017 at the GEM Sports Complex in Wrocław, Poland.

== Results ==
=== Elimination round ===
==== Group A ====
| Rank | Athlete | B | W | D | L | Pts | Score |
|---|---|---|---|---|---|---|---|
| 1 | Zabihollah Pourshab (IRI) | 3 | 3 | 0 | 0 | 6 | 6–0 |
| 2 | Uğur Aktaş (TUR) | 3 | 2 | 0 | 1 | 4 | 6–3 |
| 3 | Gogita Arkania (GEO) | 3 | 1 | 0 | 2 | 2 | 6–4 |
| 4 | Kevyn Pognon (FRA) | 3 | 0 | 0 | 3 | 0 | 2–13 |

| | Score | |
|---|---|---|
| Gogita Arkania (GEO) | 0–3 | Zabihollah Pourshab (IRI) |
| Kevyn Pognon (FRA) | 2–5 | Uğur Aktaş (TUR) |
| Gogita Arkania (GEO) | 6–0 | Kevyn Pognon (FRA) |
| Zabihollah Pourshab (IRI) | 1–0 | Uğur Aktaş (TUR) |
| Gogita Arkania (GEO) | 0–1 | Uğur Aktaş (TUR) |
| Zabihollah Pourshab (IRI) | 2–0 | Kevyn Pognon (FRA) |

==== Group B ====
| Rank | Athlete | B | W | D | L | Pts | Score |
|---|---|---|---|---|---|---|---|
| 1 | Ryutaro Araga (JPN) | 3 | 2 | 1 | 0 | 5 | 8–0 |
| 2 | Kamil Warda (POL) | 3 | 1 | 1 | 1 | 3 | 2–5 |
| 3 | Aykhan Mamayev (AZE) | 3 | 1 | 1 | 1 | 3 | 6–4 |
| 4 | Jorge Perez (DOM) | 3 | 0 | 1 | 2 | 1 | 4–11 |

| | Score | |
|---|---|---|
| Jorge Perez (DOM) | 0–0 | Kamil Warda (POL) |
| Ryutaro Araga (JPN) | 0–0 | Aykhan Mamayev (AZE) |
| Jorge Perez (DOM) | 0–4 | Ryutaro Araga (JPN) |
| Kamil Warda (POL) | 1–0 | Aykhan Mamayev (AZE) |
| Jorge Perez (DOM) | 3–6 | Aykhan Mamayev (AZE) |
| Kamil Warda (POL) | 0–4 | Ryutaro Araga (JPN) |

=== Finals ===
Semifinals
Zabihollah Pourshab (IRI) | 7
Kamil Warda (POL) | 0
Ryutaro Araga (JPN) | 6
Uğur Aktaş (TUR) | 1

Final
Zabihollah Pourshab (IRI) | 2
Ryutaro Araga (JPN) | 1
Third place
Kamil Warda (POL) | 1
Uğur Aktaş (TUR) | 6
