= Karate at the 2019 European Games – Women's kumite 50 kg =

Sporting event

Women's kumite 50 kg at the 2019 European Games
- Venue: Čyžoŭka-Arena
- Date: 30 June
- Competitors: 8 from 8 nations

Medalists
gold medal	Bettina Plank	Austria
silver medal	Serap Özçelik	Turkey
bronze medal	Mariya Koulinkovitch	Belarus
bronze medal	Sophia Bouderbane	France

The women's kumite 50 kg competition at the 2019 European Games in Minsk was held on 30 June 2019 at the Čyžoŭka-Arena.

== Schedule ==
All times are local (UTC+3).

Date	Time	Event
Sunday, 30 June 2019	09:00	Elimination round
Sunday, 30 June 2019	15:30	Semifinals
Sunday, 30 June 2019	16:36	Final

== Results ==
=== Elimination round ===
==== Group A ====
Rank	Athlete	B	W	D	L	Pts	Score
1	Bettina Plank (AUT)	3	2	1	0	5	3–1
2	Sophia Bouderbane (FRA)	3	2	0	1	4	10–6
3	Kateryna Kryva (UKR)	3	1	1	1	3	3–7
4	Jelena Milivojčević (SRB)	3	0	0	3	0	2–4

	Score	
Sophia Bouderbane (FRA)	2–2	Jelena Milivojčević (SRB)
Kateryna Kryva (UKR)	0–0	Bettina Plank (AUT)
Kateryna Kryva (UKR)	1–0	Jelena Milivojčević (SRB)
Sophia Bouderbane (FRA)	1–2	Bettina Plank (AUT)
Bettina Plank (AUT)	1–0	Jelena Milivojčević (SRB)
Sophia Bouderbane (FRA)	7–2	Kateryna Kryva (UKR)

==== Group B ====
Rank	Athlete	B	W	D	L	Pts	Score
1	Serap Özçelik (TUR)	3	2	0	1	4	10–1
2	Mariya Koulinkovitch (BLR)	3	2	0	1	4	6–7
3	Shara Hubrich (GER)	3	2	0	1	4	3–4
4	Nurana Aliyeva (AZE)	3	0	0	3	0	2–9

	Score	
Serap Özçelik (TUR)	4–0	Nurana Aliyeva (AZE)
Shara Hubrich (GER)	0–3	Mariya Koulinkovitch (BLR)
Shara Hubrich (GER)	2–1	Nurana Aliyeva (AZE)
Serap Özçelik (TUR)	6–0	Mariya Koulinkovitch (BLR)
Mariya Koulinkovitch (BLR)	3–1	Nurana Aliyeva (AZE)
Serap Özçelik (TUR)	0–1	Shara Hubrich (GER)

=== Finals ===
Semifinals
Bettina Plank (AUT)	0
Mariya Koulinkovitch (BLR)	0
Serap Özçelik (TUR)	2
Sophia Bouderbane (FRA)	0

Final
Bettina Plank (AUT)	5
Serap Özçelik (TUR)	1
