= Karate at the 2015 European Games – Women's kumite 50 kg =

Karate competition

Women's kumite 50 kg at the 2015 European Games
- Venue: Baku Crystal Hall
- Date: 13 June
- Competitors: 8 from 8 nations

Medalists
gold medal	Serap Özçelik	Turkey
silver medal	Bettina Plank	Austria
bronze medal	Alexandra Recchia	France

The Women's kumite 50 kg competition at the 2015 European Games in Baku, Azerbaijan was held on 13 June 2015 at the Crystal Hall.

== Schedule ==
All times are Azerbaijan Summer Time (UTC+5).

Date	Time	Event
Saturday, 13 June 2015	10:00	Elimination Round
Saturday, 13 June 2015	15:30	Semifinals
Saturday, 13 June 2015	17:00	Finals

== Results ==
Legend

- KK — Forfeit (Kiken)

=== Elimination round ===
==== Group A ====
Athlete	Pld	W	D	L	Points		
Athlete	Pld	W	D	L	GF	GA	Diff
Serap Özçelik (TUR)	3	3	0	0	12	0	+12
Bettina Plank (AUT)	3	2	0	1	2	3	-1
Monika Beruleč (CRO)	3	1	0	2	3	4	-1
Nurana Aliyeva (AZE)	3	0	0	3	0	10	-10

	Score	
Bettina Plank (AUT)	1-0	Nurana Aliyeva (AZE)
Serap Özçelik (TUR)	3–0	Monika Beruleč (CRO)
Bettina Plank (AUT)	1-0	Monika Beruleč (CRO)
Serap Özçelik (TUR)	6–0	Nurana Aliyeva (AZE)
Nurana Aliyeva (AZE)	0–3	Monika Beruleč (CRO)
Bettina Plank (AUT)	0-3	Serap Özçelik (TUR)

==== Group B ====
Athlete	Pld	W	D	L	Points		
Athlete	Pld	W	D	L	GF	GA	Diff
Alexandra Recchia (FRA)	3	2	1	0	3	0	+3
Kateryna Kryva (UKR)	3	1	2	0	1	0	+1
Mariya Koulinkvich (BLR)	3	1	1	1	3	2	+1
Duygu Bugur (GER)	3	0	0	3	0	5	-5

	Score	
Alexandra Recchia (FRA)	0–0	Kateryna Kryva (UKR)
Duygu Bugur (GER)	0–3	Mariya Koulinkvich (BLR)
Alexandra Recchia (FRA)	2-0	Mariya Koulinkvich (BLR)
Duygu Bugur (GER)	0-1	Kateryna Kryva (UKR)
Kateryna Kryva (UKR)	0-0	Mariya Koulinkvich (BLR)
Alexandra Recchia (FRA)	1-0	Duygu Bugur (GER)

== Finals ==
Semifinals
(Turkey) Serap Özçelik (TUR)	0
(Ukraine) Kateryna Kryva (UKR)	0
(Austria) Bettina Plank (AUT)	2
(France) Alexandra Recchia (FRA)	0

Gold medal match
(Turkey) Serap Özçelik (TUR)	1
(Austria) Bettina Plank (AUT)	0
Bronze medal match
(Ukraine) Kateryna Kryva (UKR)	0
(France) Alexandra Recchia (FRA)	0
