= Muaythai at the 2017 World Games – Men's 81 kg =

World Games muaythai event

Men's 81 kg at the 2017 World Games
- Muaythai pictogram
- Venue: Orbita Hall
- Dates: 28–30 July 2017
- Competitors: 8 from 8 nations

Medalists
1st place, gold medalist(s)		Ali Dogan	Turkey
2nd place, silver medalist(s)		Constantino Nanga	Sweden
3rd place, bronze medalist(s)		Mikita Shostak	Belarus

The men's 81 kg muaythai (Note: Muaythai is the official name of Muay Thai, recognized by International World Games Association and International Olympic Committee.) event at the 2017 World Games was held from 28 to 30 July 2017 at the Orbita Hall. 8 Muay Thai practitioners from 8 nations competed.

== Competition schedule ==
All times are in local time (UTC+2), according to the official schedule.

Legend
QF	Quarterfinals	SF	Semifinals	F	Finals

M = Morning session, A = Afternoon session, E = Evening session

Date →	Jul 28			Jul 29			Jul 30		
Event ↓	M	A	E	M	A	E	M	A	E
Men's 81 kg			QF		SF			F	

== Results ==
=== Legend ===
- WO — Won by walkover

=== Gold medal match ===
Gold medal match
Constantino Nanga (SWE)	28
Ali Doğan (TUR)	29

=== Main bracket ===
Quarterfinals
Mikita Shostak (BLR)	30
Ayoob Saki (IRI)	27
Manuel Magi (ITA)
Constantino Nanga (SWE)	WO
Mohammad Salama (JOR)	27
Ali Doğan (TUR)	30
Ivan Valenzuela (MEX)	28
Rafał Korczak (POL)	29

Semifinals
Mikita Shostak (BLR)	27
Constantino Nanga (SWE)	30
Ali Doğan (TUR)	30
Rafał Korczak (POL)	27

Gold medal match
Constantino Nanga (SWE)	28
Ali Doğan (TUR)	29

=== Bronze medal match ===
Bronze medal match
Mikita Shostak (BLR)	WO
Rafał Korczak (POL)
