= Karate at the 2017 World Games – Women's kumite 50 kg =

Women's Kumite 50kg at the 2017 World Games
- Venue: GEM Sports Complex
- Date: 25 July 2017
- Competitors: 8 from 8 nations

Medalists
1st place, gold medalist(s)		(France) Alexandra Recchia
2nd place, silver medalist(s)		(Japan) Miho Miyahara
3rd place, bronze medalist(s)		(Turkey) Serap Özçelik

The women's kumite 50 kg competition in karate at the 2017 World Games took place on 25 July 2017 at the GEM Sports Complex in Wrocław, Poland.

== Results ==
=== Elimination round ===
==== Group A ====
Rank	Athlete	B	W	D	L	Pts	Score
1	Miho Miyahara (JPN)	3	3	0	0	6	16–3
2	Magdalena Nowakowska (POL)	3	2	0	1	4	7–6
3	Lydia Besbes (ALG)	3	1	0	2	2	1–4
4	Maria Alexiadis (AUS)	3	0	0	3	0	0–11

	Score	
Miho Miyahara (JPN)	6–3	Magdalena Nowakowska (POL)
Lydia Besbes (ALG)	1–0	Maria Alexiadis (AUS)
Miho Miyahara (JPN)	2–0	Lydia Besbes (ALG)
Magdalena Nowakowska (POL)	2–0	Maria Alexiadis (AUS)
Miho Miyahara (JPN)	8–0	Maria Alexiadis (AUS)
Magdalena Nowakowska (POL)	2–0	Lydia Besbes (ALG)

==== Group B ====
Rank	Athlete	B	W	D	L	Pts	Score
1	Alexandra Recchia (FRA)	3	2	1	0	5	2–0
2	Serap Özçelik (TUR)	3	1	2	0	4	2–0
3	Bettina Plank (AUT)	3	1	0	2	2	1–3
4	Kateryna Kryva (UKR)	3	0	1	2	1	0–2

	Score	
Kateryna Kryva (UKR)	0–0	Serap Özçelik (TUR)
Bettina Plank (AUT)	0–1	Alexandra Recchia (FRA)
Kateryna Kryva (UKR)	0–1	Bettina Plank (AUT)
Serap Özçelik (TUR)	0–0	Alexandra Recchia (FRA)
Kateryna Kryva (UKR)	0–1	Alexandra Recchia (FRA)
Serap Özçelik (TUR)	2–0	Bettina Plank (AUT)

=== Finals ===
Semifinals
Miho Miyahara (JPN)	4
Serap Özçelik (TUR)	0
Alexandra Recchia (FRA)	4
Magdalena Nowakowska (POL)	1

Final
Miho Miyahara (JPN)	4
Alexandra Recchia (FRA)	6
Third place
Serap Özçelik (TUR)	2
Magdalena Nowakowska (POL)	0
