= Tkebuchava =

Tkebuchava is a surname. Notable people with the surname include:

- David Tkebuchava (born 1991), Russian footballer
- Gocha Tkebuchava (born 1963), Georgian footballer
