= Karate at the 2017 World Games – Women's kumite +68 kg =

Women's Kumite +68kg at the 2017 World Games
- Venue: GEM Sports Complex
- Date: 26 July 2017
- Competitors: 6 from 6 nations

Medalists
1st place, gold medalist(s)		(Japan) Ayumi Uekusa
2nd place, silver medalist(s)		(Iran) Hamideh Abbasali
3rd place, bronze medalist(s)		(France) Anne-Laure Florentin

The women's kumite +68 kg competition in karate at the 2017 World Games took place on 26 July 2017 at the GEM Sports Complex in Wrocław, Poland.

== Results ==
=== Elimination round ===
==== Group A ====
Rank	Athlete	B	W	D	L	Pts	Score
1	Hamideh Abbasali (IRI)	2	2	0	1	4	6–1
2	Isabela Rodrigues (BRA)	2	1	0	1	2	4–4
3	Dominika Tatarova (SVK)	2	0	0	2	0	1–6

	Score	
Dominika Tatarova (SVK)	0–4	Isabela Rodrigues (BRA)
Dominika Tatarova (SVK)	1–2	Hamideh Abbasali (IRI)
Isabela Rodrigues (BRA)	0–4	Hamideh Abbasali (IRI)

==== Group B ====
Rank	Athlete	B	W	D	L	Pts	Score
1	Ayumi Uekusa (JPN)	2	2	0	0	4	4–0
2	Anne-Laure Florentin (FRA)	2	1	0	1	2	3–4
3	Berenika Prządka (POL)	2	0	0	2	0	1–4

	Score	
Berenika Prządka (POL)	0–1	Ayumi Uekusa (JPN)
Berenika Prządka (POL)	1–3	Anne-Laure Florentin (FRA)
Ayumi Uekusa (JPN)	3–0	Anne-Laure Florentin (FRA)

=== Finals ===
Semifinals
Hamideh Abbasali (IRI)	5
Anne-Laure Florentin (FRA)	1
Ayumi Uekusa (JPN)	0
Isabela Rodrigues (BRA)	0

Final
Hamideh Abbasali (IRI)	0
Ayumi Uekusa (JPN)	0
Third place
Anne-Laure Florentin (FRA)	2
Isabela Rodrigues (BRA)	0
