= Karate at the 2017 World Games – Men's kumite 60 kg =

Men's Kumite 60kg at the 2017 World Games
- Venue: GEM Sports Complex
- Date: 25 July 2017
- Competitors: 8 from 8 nations

Medalists
1st place, gold medalist(s)		(Azerbaijan) Firdovsi Farzaliyev
2nd place, silver medalist(s)		(Iran) Amir Mehdizadeh
3rd place, bronze medalist(s)		(Spain) Matías Gómez

The men's kumite 60 kg competition in karate at the 2017 World Games took place on 25 July 2017 at the GEM Sports Complex in Wrocław, Poland.

== Results ==
=== Elimination round ===
==== Group A ====
Rank	Athlete	B	W	D	L	Pts	Score
1	Douglas Brose (BRA)	3	3	0	0	6	6–1
2	Amir Mehdizadeh (IRI)	3	2	0	1	4	9–2
3	Sofiane Agoudjil (FRA)	3	1	0	2	2	6–3
4	Maciej Drążewski (POL)	3	0	0	3	0	0–15

	Score	
Amir Mehdizadeh (IRI)	1–1	Douglas Brose (BRA)
Sofiane Agoudjil (FRA)	5–0	Maciej Drążewski (POL)
Amir Mehdizadeh (IRI)	3–1	Sofiane Agoudjil (FRA)
Douglas Brose (BRA)	5–0	Maciej Drążewski (POL)
Amir Mehdizadeh (IRI)	5–0	Maciej Drążewski (POL)
Douglas Brose (BRA)	0–0	Sofiane Agoudjil (FRA)

==== Group B ====
Rank	Athlete	B	W	D	L	Pts	Score
1	Matías Gómez (ESP)	3	2	1	0	5	7–0
2	Firdovsi Farzaliyev (AZE)	3	1	2	0	4	2–0
3	Geoffrey Berens (NED)	3	1	1	1	3	1–5
4	Emad Al-Malki (KSA)	3	0	0	3	0	1–6

	Score	
Firdovsi Farzaliyev (AZE)	2–0	Emad Al-Malki (KSA)
Geoffrey Berens (NED)	0–4	Matías Gómez (ESP)
Firdovsi Farzaliyev (AZE)	0–0	Geoffrey Berens (NED)
Emad Al-Malki (KSA)	0–3	Matías Gómez (ESP)
Firdovsi Farzaliyev (AZE)	0–0	Matías Gómez (ESP)
Emad Al-Malki (KSA)	1–1	Geoffrey Berens (NED)

=== Finals ===
Semifinals
Douglas Brose (BRA)	0
Firdovsi Farzaliyev (AZE)	5
Matías Gómez (ESP)	0
Amir Mehdizadeh (IRI)	7

Final
Firdovsi Farzaliyev (AZE)	4
Amir Mehdizadeh (IRI)	2
Third place
Douglas Brose (BRA)	1
Matías Gómez (ESP)	1
