= Muaythai at the 2017 World Games – Women's 54 kg =

World Games muaythai event

Women's 54 kg at the 2017 World Games
- Muaythai pictogram
- Venue: Orbita Hall
- Dates: 28–30 July 2017
- Competitors: 8 from 8 nations

Medalists
1st place, gold medalist(s)		Sofia Olofsson	Sweden
2nd place, silver medalist(s)		Valeriya Drozdova	Russia
3rd place, bronze medalist(s)		Meltem Baş	Turkey

The women's 54 kg muaythai (Note: Muaythai is the official name of Muay Thai, recognized by International World Games Association and International Olympic Committee.) event at the 2017 World Games was held from 28 to 30 July 2017 at the Orbita Hall. 8 Muay Thai practitioners from 8 nations are expected to compete.

== Competition schedule ==
All times are in local time (UTC+2), according to the official schedule.

Legend
QF	Quarterfinals	SF	Semifinals	F	Finals

M = Morning session, A = Afternoon session, E = Evening session

Date →	Jul 28			Jul 29			Jul 30		
Event ↓	M	A	E	M	A	E	M	A	E
Women's 54 kg		QF			SF		F		

== Results ==
=== Legend ===
- RSC-OC — Won by Referee Stopping Contest - Out Class in Round 3
- WO — Won by walkover

=== Gold medal match ===
Gold medal match
Sofia Olofsson (SWE)	30
Valeriya Drozdova (RUS)	27

=== Main bracket ===
Quarterfinals
Sofia Olofsson (SWE)	30
Maria Lobo (POR)	27
Tristana Tola (PER)	30
Natalia Leciejewska (POL)	27
Janice Lyn (CAN)	27
Meltem Baş (TUR)	30
Valeriya Drozdova (RUS)	30
Juliette Lacroix (FRA)	27

Semifinals
Sofia Olofsson (SWE)	RSC-OC
Tristana Tola (PER)
Meltem Baş (TUR)	27
Valeriya Drozdova (RUS)	30

Gold medal match
Sofia Olofsson (SWE)	30
Valeriya Drozdova (RUS)	27

=== Bronze medal match ===
Bronze medal match
Tristana Tola (PER)	27
Meltem Baş (TUR)	30
