= Karate at the 2020 Summer Olympics – Men's +75 kg =

Karate competition

Men's kumite +75 kg at the Games of the XXXII Olympiad
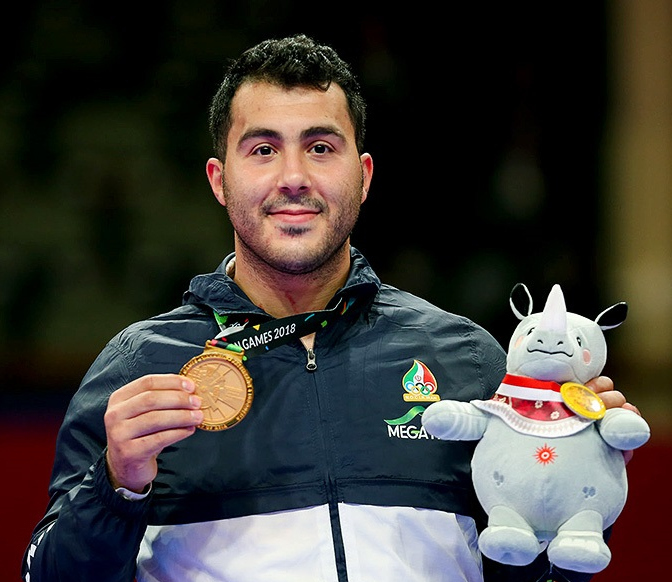
- The Gold medalist Sajjad Ganjzadeh
- Venue: Nippon Budokan
- Date: 7 August 2021
- Competitors: 10 from 10 nations

Medalists
1st place, gold medalist(s)		Sajjad Ganjzadeh	Iran
2nd place, silver medalist(s)		Tareg Hamedi	Saudi Arabia
3rd place, bronze medalist(s)		Ryutaro Araga	Japan
3rd place, bronze medalist(s)		Uğur Aktaş	Turkey

The men's kumite +75 kg competition in Karate at the 2020 Summer Olympics was held on 7 August 2021 at the Nippon Budokan.

== Competition format ==
The competition began with a two-pool round-robin stage followed by a single elimination stage. Each pool consisted of five athletes, with those positioned 1st and 4th seeded to Pool A, and those positioned 2nd and 3rd to Pool B. The athlete that finished first in Pool A faced the athlete that finished second in Pool B in the semifinals, and vice versa. There were no bronze medal matches in the kumite events. Losers of the semifinals each received a bronze medal.

== Schedule ==
All times are in local time (UTC+9).

Date	Time	Round
Saturday, 7 August 2021	16:50; 19:37; 20:05; 20:15	Pool stage Semifinals; Gold medal match Victory ceremony

== Results ==
=== Pool stage ===
Pool A

Athlete	Pld	W	D	L	Pts	Qualification
Ryutaro Araga (JPN)	3	3	0	0	6	Semifinals
Uğur Aktaş (TUR)	3	2	0	1	4	Semifinals
Gogita Arkania (GEO)	3	1	0	2	2	
Daniyar Yuldashev (KAZ)	3	0	0	3	0	
Jonathan Horne (GER) (Note: Jonathan Horne withdrew due to injury.)	0	0	0	0	0	

Pool B

Athlete	Pld	W	D	L	Pts	Qualification
Sajjad Ganjzadeh (IRI)	4	3	1	0	7	Semifinals
Tareg Hamedi (KSA)	4	2	1	1	5	Semifinals
Ivan Kvesić (CRO)	4	2	0	2	4	
Daniel Gaysinsky (CAN)	4	1	1	2	3	
Brian Irr (USA)	4	0	1	3	1	

=== Finals ===
Semifinals
A1 Ryutaro Araga (JPN) (bronze)	0
B2 Tareg Hamedi (KSA)	2
B1 Sajjad Ganjzadeh (IRI)	2
A2 Uğur Aktaş (TUR) (bronze)	2

Gold medal
Tareg Hamedi (KSA) (silver) (Note: Hamedi was leading the match when he made an ippon kick to the head of Ganjzadeh called a hansoku, which knocked him unconscious. The judges ruled the kick was extreme and illegal, and Ganjzadeh was awarded gold by disqualification.)	0
Sajjad Ganjzadeh (IRI) (gold)	4

== Reaction ==
The final bout of the men's over-75 kilogram kumite ended after Iranian Sajjad Ganjzadeh was knocked out by his opponent, Saudi Tareg Hamedi.

The judges' decision to disqualify Hamedi and crown Iranian Sajjad Ganjzadeh as champion as he was being removed from the arena on a stretcher sparked strong reactions around the karate world.
