= Geoffrey Berens =

Dutch karateka

Personal information
- Born: 6 April 1983 (age 43)

Sport
- Country: Netherlands
- Sport: Karate
- Weight class: 60 kg
Medal record
Men's karate
Representing Netherlands
World Championships
Silver medal – second place	2014 Bremen	Kumite 60 kg
Silver medal – second place	2016 Linz	Kumite 60 kg
European Championships
Bronze medal – third place	2014 Tampere	Kumite 60 kg
Bronze medal – third place	2015 Istanbul	Team kumite

Geoffrey Berens (born 6 April 1983) is a Dutch karateka. He is a two-time silver medalist in the men's kumite 60 kg event at the World Karate Championships, both in 2014 and 2016. In 2017, he represented the Netherlands at the World Games in the men's kumite 60 kg event without winning a medal. This also marked the end of his sports career.

== Achievements ==
Year	Competition	Venue	Rank	Event
2014	European Championships	Tampere, Finland	3rd	Kumite 60 kg
2014	World Championships	Bremen, Germany	2nd	Kumite 60 kg
2015	European Championships	Istanbul, Turkey	3rd	Team kumite
2016	World Championships	Linz, Austria	2nd	Kumite 60 kg
