= Azerbaijan at the 2017 World Games =

Azerbaijan at the World Games 2017
- IOC code: AZE
- NOC: National Olympic Committee of the Azerbaijani Republic

in Wrocław, Poland 20 July 2017 – 30 July 2017
- Competitors: 6 in 4 sports
- Medals: Gold 1 Silver Bronze Total

World Games appearances
- 1981; 1985; 1989; 1993; 1997; 2001; 2005; 2009; 2013; 2017; 2022; 2025

Azerbaijan competed at the World Games 2017 in Wrocław, Poland, from 20 July 2017 to 30 July 2017, fielding a team of 6 athletes; 5 men and 1 woman.

== Competitors ==
Sports	Men	Women	Total	Events
Karate	3	0	3	3
Rhythmic gymnastics	0	1	1	4
Trampoline	1	0	1	1
Tumbling	1	0	1	1
Total	5	1	6	9

== Gymnastic ==
=== Rhythmic gymnastics ===
Azerbaijan has qualified at the 2017 World Games:

- Women's individual event - 1 quota

=== Trampoline ===
Azerbaijan has qualified at the 2017 World Games:

- Men's Individual Double Mini Trampoline - 1 quota

== Karate ==
Firdovsi Farzaliyev won the gold medal in the men's kumite 60 kg event.
