= Alexandra Recchia =

French karateka (born 1988)

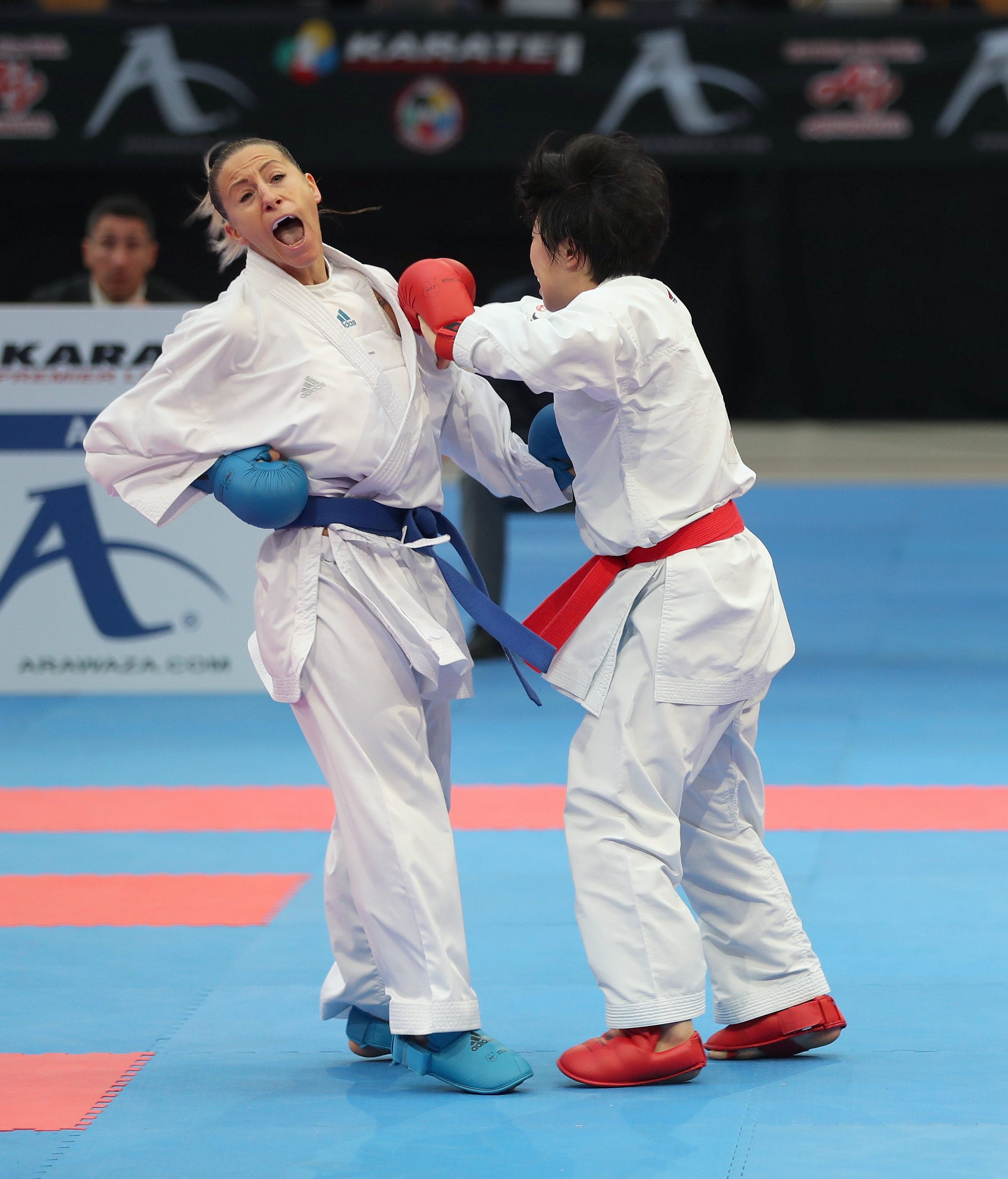
- Recchia in 2018

Personal information
- Born: 25 October 1988 (age 37) Lyon, France

Sport
- Country: France
- Sport: Karate
- Weight class: 50 kg
- Events: Kumite; Team kumite
Medal record
Women's karate
Representing France
World Championships
| Gold medal – first place | 2010 Belgrade | Team kumite |
| Gold medal – first place | 2012 Paris | Kumite 50 kg |
| Gold medal – first place | 2012 Paris | Team kumite |
| Gold medal – first place | 2016 Linz | Kumite 50 kg |
| Gold medal – first place | 2016 Linz | Team kumite |
| Silver medal – second place | 2014 Bremen | Team kumite |
| Bronze medal – third place | 2008 Tokyo | Team kumite |
| Bronze medal – third place | 2014 Bremen | Kumite 50 kg |
European Games
| Bronze medal – third place | 2015 Baku | Kumite 50 kg |
European Championships
| Gold medal – first place | 2013 Budapest | Kumite 50 kg |
| Gold medal – first place | 2016 Montpellier | Kumite 50 kg |
| Silver medal – second place | 2011 Zürich | Team kumite |
| Silver medal – second place | 2013 Budapest | Team kumite |
| Silver medal – second place | 2015 Istanbul | Kumite 50 kg |
| Bronze medal – third place | 2016 Montpellier | Team kumite |
| Bronze medal – third place | 2017 İzmit | Team kumite |
| Bronze medal – third place | 2018 Novi Sad | Kumite 50 kg |
| Bronze medal – third place | 2021 Poreč | Kumite 50 kg |
World Games
| Gold medal – first place | 2017 Wrocław | Kumite 50 kg |
| Silver medal – second place | 2013 Cali | Kumite 50 kg |
Mediterranean Games
| Bronze medal – third place | 2013 Mersin | Kumite 50 kg |
World Combat Games
| Bronze medal – third place | 2013 Saint Petersburg | Kumite 50 kg |

Alexandra Recchia (born 25 October 1988) is a French karateka. She is a two-time gold medalist in the women's kumite 50 kg event at the World Karate Championships and a two-time gold medalist in this event at the European Karate Championships.

== Career ==
Recchia won one of the bronze medals in the women's team kumite event at the 2008 World Karate Championships held in Tokyo, Japan. In 2010, she won the gold medal in this event at the World Karate Championships held in Belgrade, Serbia. In 2012, Recchia won the gold medal in the women's team kumite and the women's kumite 50 kg events at the World Karate Championships held in Paris, France.

At the 2013 World Games held in Cali, Colombia, Recchia won the silver medal in the women's kumite 50 kg event. In the final, she lost against Serap Özçelik of Turkey. In that same year, Recchia also won the bronze medal in the women's kumite 50 kg event at the 2013 World Combat Games held in Saint Petersburg, Russia.

In 2017, Recchia won the gold medal in the women's kumite 50 kg event at the World Games in Wrocław, Poland. In the final, she defeated Miho Miyahara of Japan. In 2018, she won one of the bronze medals in the women's kumite 50 kg event at the European Karate Championships held in Novi Sad, Serbia.

In 2021, Recchia competed at the World Olympic Qualification Tournament held in Paris, France hoping to qualify for the 2020 Summer Olympics in Tokyo, Japan. She won her first three matches and she was then eliminated in the quarterfinals by Jennifer Warling of Luxembourg.

== Personal life ==
She earned a master's degree in law in 2012. In 2016, she earned her practising certificate.

== Achievements ==
| Year | Competition | Venue | Rank | Event |
|---|---|---|---|---|
| 2008 | World Championships | Tokyo, Japan | 3rd | Team kumite |
| 2010 | World Championships | Belgrade, Serbia | 1st | Team kumite |
| 2012 | World Championships | Paris, France | 1st | Team kumite |
| 2012 | World Championships | Paris, France | 1st | Kumite 50 kg |
| 2013 | European Championships | Budapest, Hungary | 1st | Kumite 50 kg |
| 2013 | European Championships | Budapest, Hungary | 2nd | Team kumite |
| 2013 | Mediterranean Games | Mersin, Turkey | 3rd | Kumite 50 kg |
| 2013 | World Games | Cali, Colombia | 2nd | Kumite 50 kg |
| 2013 | World Combat Games | Saint Petersburg, Russia | 3rd | Kumite 50 kg |
| 2014 | World Championships | Bremen, Germany | 2nd | Team kumite |
| 2014 | World Championships | Bremen, Germany | 3rd | Kumite 50 kg |
| 2015 | European Championships | Istanbul, Turkey | 2nd | Kumite 50 kg |
| 2015 | European Games | Baku, Azerbaijan | 3rd | Kumite 50 kg |
| 2016 | European Championships | Montpellier, France | 3rd | Team kumite |
| 2016 | European Championships | Montpellier, France | 1st | Kumite 50 kg |
| 2016 | World Championships | Linz, Austria | 1st | Team kumite |
| 2016 | World Championships | Linz, Austria | 1st | Kumite 50 kg |
| 2017 | European Championships | İzmit, Turkey | 3rd | Team kumite |
| 2017 | World Games | Wrocław, Poland | 1st | Kumite 50 kg |
| 2018 | European Championships | Novi Sad, Serbia | 3rd | Kumite 50 kg |
| 2021 | European Championships | Poreč, Croatia | 3rd | Kumite 50 kg |
