= Anne-Laure Florentin =

French karateka (born 1991)

Personal information
- Born: 9 November 1991 (age 34) Aubagne, France

Sport
- Country: France
- Sport: Karate
- Weight class: +68 kg
- Event: Kumite
Medal record
Women's karate
Representing France
European Championships
Gold medal – first place	2016 Montpellier	Kumite +68 kg
Gold medal – first place	2017 Kocaeli	Kumite +68 kg
Gold medal – first place	2018 Novi Sad	Kumite +68 kg
World Games
Bronze medal – third place	2017 Wrocław	Kumite +68 kg

Anne-Laure Florentin (born 9 November 1991) is a French karateka. She is a three-time European champion in the women's kumite +68 kg event. She won the bronze medal in the women's kumite +68 kg event at the World Games in Wrocław, Poland.

== Career ==
In 2017, Florentin won the bronze medal in the women's kumite +68 kg event at the World Games in Wrocław, Poland. She defeated Isabela Rodrigues of Brazil in her bronze medal match.

In 2016 and 2017, Florentin won the gold medal in the women's kumite +68 kg event at the European Karate Championships. At the 2018 European Karate Championships held in Novi Sad, Serbia, she won her third gold medal in her event.

== Achievements ==
Year	Competition	Venue	Rank	Event
2016	European Championships	Montpellier, France	1st	Kumite +68 kg
2017	European Championships	Kocaeli, Turkey	1st	Kumite +68 kg
2017	World Games	Wrocław, Poland	3rd	Kumite +68 kg
2018	European Championships	Novi Sad, Serbia	1st	Kumite +68 kg
