= Firdovsi Farzaliyev =

Azerbaijani karateka (born 1993)

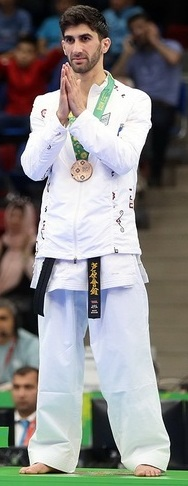
- Firdovsi Farzaliyev in 2017

Personal information
- Born: 10 July 1993 (age 32)

Sport
- Country: Azerbaijan
- Sport: Karate
- Weight class: 60 kg
- Event: Kumite
Medal record
Men's karate
Representing Azerbaijan
World Championships
Bronze medal – third place	2016 Linz	Kumite 60 kg
European Games
Gold medal – first place	2015 Baku	Kumite 60 kg
Silver medal – second place	2019 Minsk	Kumite 60 kg
Islamic Solidarity Games
Bronze medal – third place	2017 Baku	Kumite 60 kg
World Games
Gold medal – first place	2017 Wrocław	Kumite 60 kg

Firdovsi Farzaliyev (born 10 July 1993) is an Azerbaijani karateka. He won the gold medal in the men's kumite 60 kg event at the 2015 European Games held in Baku, Azerbaijan and at the 2017 World Games held in Wrocław, Poland. He also won one of the bronze medals in this event at the 2016 World Karate Championships held in Linz, Austria.

Farzaliyev represented Azerbaijan at the 2020 Summer Olympics in Tokyo, Japan. He competed in the men's 67 kg event where he did not advance to compete in the semifinals.

== Career ==
Farzaliyev won the gold medal in the men's kumite 60 kg event at the 2017 World Games held in Wrocław, Poland. In the final, he defeated Amir Mehdizadeh of Iran.

In 2019, Farzaliyev won the silver medal in the men's kumite 60 kg event at the European Games held in Minsk, Belarus.

Farzaliyev qualified at the World Olympic Qualification Tournament in Paris, France to represent Azerbaijan at the 2020 Summer Olympics in Tokyo, Japan.

== Achievements ==
Year	Competition	Venue	Rank	Event
2015	European Games	Baku, Azerbaijan	1st	Kumite 60 kg
2016	World Championships	Linz, Austria	3rd	Kumite 60 kg
2017	Islamic Solidarity Games	Baku, Azerbaijan	3rd	Kumite 60 kg
2017	World Games	Wrocław, Poland	1st	Kumite 60 kg
2019	European Games	Minsk, Belarus	2nd	Kumite 60 kg
