= David Tkebuchava =

Russian footballer

Personal information
- Full name: David Muradovich Tkebuchava
- Date of birth: 17 January 1991 (age 35)
- Height: 1.68 m (5 ft 6 in)
- Position: Midfielder

Senior career*
| Years | Team | Apps | (Gls) |
| 2010 | FC Rostov | 0 | (0) |
| 2012–2013 | FC Baltika Kaliningrad | 3 | (0) |
- * Club domestic league appearances and goals

David Muradovich Tkebuchava (Russian: Давид Мурадович Ткебучава; born 17 January 1991) is a former Russian football midfielder of Georgian descent.

== Club career ==
He made his debut in the Russian Football National League for FC Baltika Kaliningrad on 13 August 2012 in a game against FC Sibir Novosibirsk.
