= Ryutaro Araga =

Japanese karateka (born 1990)

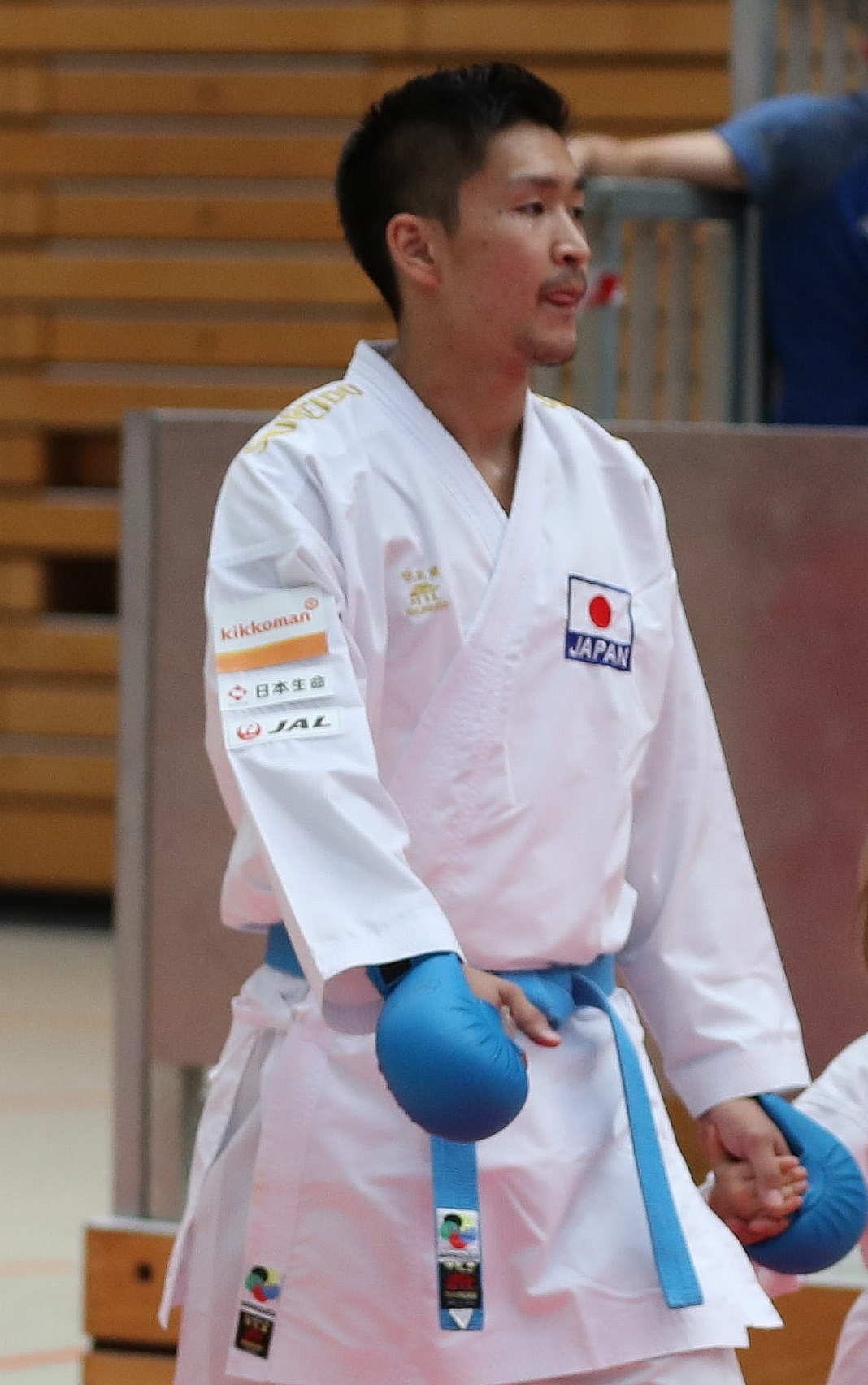
- Araga in 2018

Personal information
- Born: 16 October 1990 (age 35) Kameoka, Japan

Sport
- Country: Japan
- Sport: Karate
- Weight class: 84 kg; 75+ kg (Olympic Games)
- Events: Kumite; Team kumite
Medal record
Men's karate
Representing Japan
Summer Olympics
Bronze medal – third place	2020 Tokyo	Kumite +75 kg
World Championships
Gold medal – first place	2016 Linz	Kumite 84 kg
Silver medal – second place	2012 Paris	Kumite 84 kg
Silver medal – second place	2014 Bremen	Kumite 84 kg
Silver medal – second place	2016 Linz	Team kumite
Bronze medal – third place	2014 Bremen	Team kumite
Bronze medal – third place	2018 Madrid	Team kumite
Asian Championships
Gold medal – first place	2013 Dubai	Kumite 84 kg
Gold medal – first place	2015 Yokohama	Kumite 84 kg
Gold medal – first place	2018 Amman	Kumite 84 kg
Bronze medal – third place	2019 Tashkent	Kumite 84 kg
Asian Games
Gold medal – first place	2014 Incheon	Kumite 84 kg
Gold medal – first place	2018 Jakarta	Kumite 84 kg
Silver medal – second place	2010 Guangzhou	Kumite 84 kg
World Games
Gold medal – first place	2013 Cali	Kumite 84 kg
Silver medal – second place	2017 Wrocław	Kumite 84 kg
World Combat Games
Silver medal – second place	2013 Saint Petersburg	Kumite 84 kg

Ryutaro Araga (荒賀 龍太郎, Araga Ryūtarō, born 16 October 1990) is a Japanese karateka. He won one of the bronze medals in the men's +75 kg event at the 2020 Summer Olympics held in Tokyo, Japan. He won the gold medal in the kumite 84 kg event at the 2016 World Karate Championships in Linz, Austria. At the Asian Games, he won the gold medal in this event both in 2014 and in 2018. He is also a three-time gold medalist in his event at the Asian Karate Championships.

== Career ==
At the Asian Karate Championships, he won the gold medal in 2013, 2015 and 2018. In 2019, he won one of the bronze medals at this event. At the 2016 World Karate Championships held in Linz, Austria, he won the silver medal in the men's team kumite event.

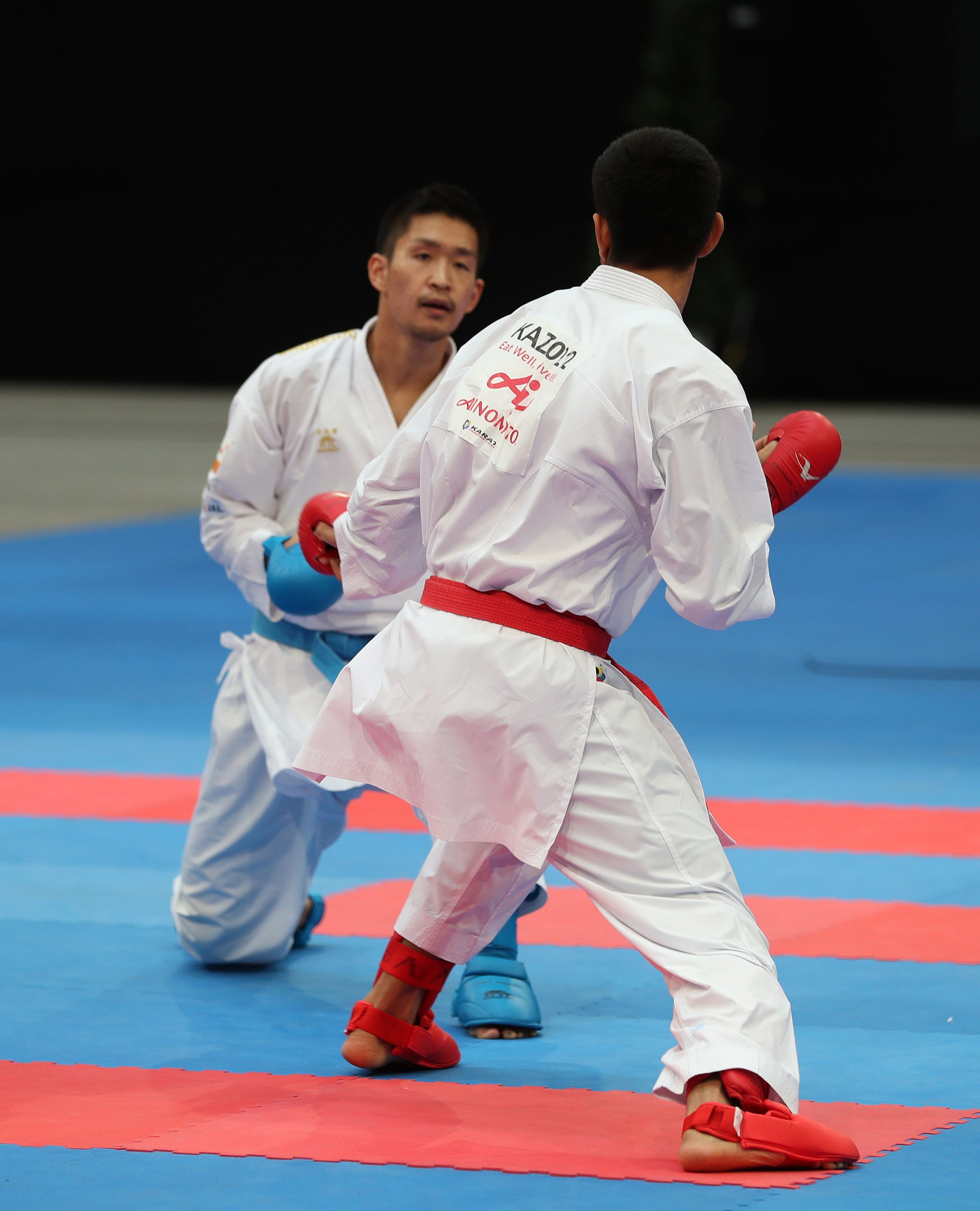
Araga at the Karate 1 Premier League 2018 in Berlin

At the 2013 World Games held in Cali, Colombia, he won the gold medal in the men's kumite 84 kg event. In 2017, he won the silver medal in the men's kumite 84 kg event at the World Games in Wrocław, Poland.

He represented Japan at the 2020 Summer Olympics in Tokyo, Japan.

== Achievements ==
Year	Competition	Venue	Rank	Event
2010	Asian Games	Guangzhou, China	2nd	Kumite 84 kg
2012	World Championships	Paris, France	2nd	Kumite 84 kg
2013	World Games	Cali, Colombia	1st	Kumite 84 kg
2014	World Championships	Bremen, Germany	2nd	Kumite 84 kg
2014	World Championships	Bremen, Germany	3rd	Team kumite
2015	Asian Championships	Yokohama, Japan	1st	Kumite 84 kg
2016	World Championships	Linz, Austria	1st	Kumite 84 kg
2016	World Championships	Linz, Austria	2nd	Team kumite
2017	World Games	Wrocław, Poland	2nd	Kumite 84 kg
2018	World Championships	Madrid, Spain	3rd	Team kumite
2021	Olympic Games	Tokyo, Japan	3rd	Kumite +75 kg
