= Uğur Aktaş (karateka) =

Turkish karateka (born 1995)

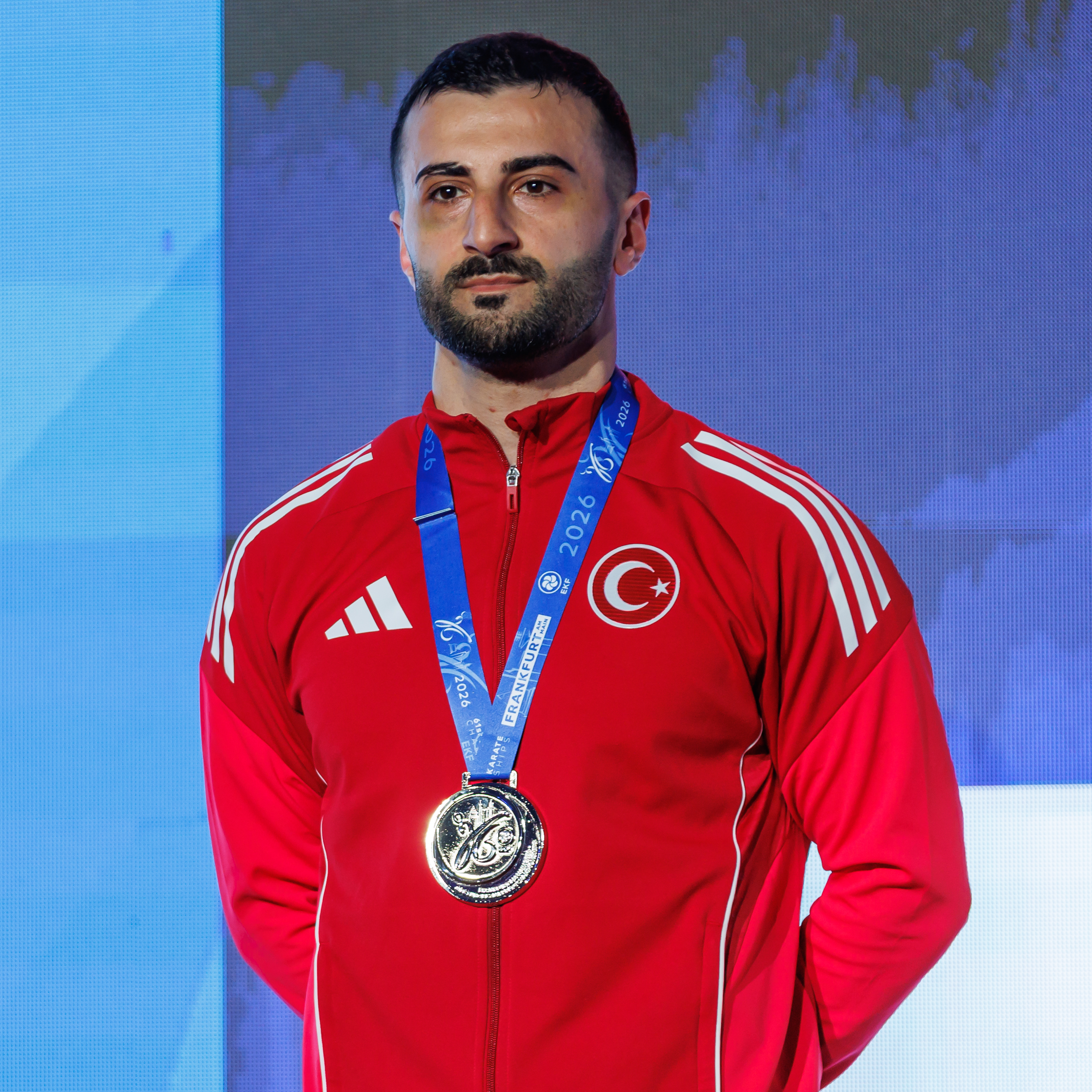
- Aktaş in 2018
- Born: 10 October 1995 (age 31)
- Nationality: Turkish
- Division: 84 kg
- Style: Karate Kumite
- Team: Istanbul BB SK

Other information
- Occupation: Electrical/Electronic engineering
- University: Istanbul Aydın University
- Website: Official Instagram Profile

Uğur Aktaş (born 10 October 1995) is a European champion Turkish karateka competing in the kumite 84 kg division. He won one of the bronze medals in the men's +75 kg event at the 2020 Summer Olympics held in Tokyo, Japan. He is a member of İstanbul Büyükşehir Belediyesi S.K.

He won one of the bronze medals in the men's 84 kg event at the 2022 Mediterranean Games held in Oran, Algeria.

Aktaş graduated from Istanbul Aydın University with a degree in Electrical/Electronic engineering.

== Achievements ==
2015

- Bronze 1st European Games – 13 June, Baku, AZE – kumite 67 kg,

2017

- Gold European Championships – 6 May, İzmit, TUR – kumite 67 kg,

2020

- Bronze 2020 Olympic Games
