= Kateryna Kryva =

Ukrainian karateka (born 1992)

Personal information
- Born: 6 February 1992 (age 34) Nova Ushytsia, Ukraine

Sport
- Country: Ukraine
- Sport: Karate
- Weight class: 50 kg
- Events: Kumite; Team kumite
Medal record
Women's karate
Representing Ukraine
World Championships
Bronze medal – third place	2021 Dubai	Kumite 50 kg
European Championships
Gold medal – first place	2017 İzmit	Kumite 50 kg
Gold medal – first place	2017 İzmit	Team kumite
Bronze medal – third place	2021 Poreč	Kumite 50 kg

Kateryna Kryva (Ukrainian: Катерина Крива; born 6 February 1992) is a Ukrainian karateka. She won the gold medal in the women's 50 kg and women's team kumite events at the 2017 European Karate Championships held in İzmit, Turkey. She also won one of the bronze medals in the women's 50 kg event at the 2021 World Karate Championships held in Dubai, United Arab Emirates.

In 2017, she competed in the women's kumite 50 kg event at the World Games in Wrocław, Poland.

In May 2021, she won one of the bronze medals in the women's 50 kg event at the European Karate Championships held in Poreč, Croatia.

She competed in the women's 50 kg at the 2022 World Games held in Birmingham, United States.

In 2023, she competed in the women's 50 kg event at the European Games held in Poland.
