= Iran at the 2017 World Games =

Iran at the World Games 2017
- IOC code: IRI
- NOC: National Olympic Committee of the Islamic Republic of Iran

in Wrocław, Poland 20 July 2017 – 30 July 2017
- Competitors: 19 in 7 sports

World Games appearances (overview)
- 1981; 1985; 1989; 1993; 1997; 2001; 2005; 2009; 2013; 2017; 2022; 2025

Iran competed at the World Games 2017 in Wrocław, Poland, from 20 July 2017 to 30 July 2017.

== Competitors ==
Sports	Men	Women	Total
Archery	1	1	2
Billiard sports	1	0	1
Ju-jitsu	1	0	1
Karate	4	1	5
Kickboxing	5	1	6
Muaythai	3	0	3
Sport climbing	1	0	1
Total	16	3	19

Source :

== Karate ==
Iran has qualified at the 2017 World Games:

- Men's Individual Kumite -60 kg – 1 quota (Amir Mehdizadeh)
- Men's Individual Kumite -75 kg – 1 quota (Asiabari Aliasghar)
- Women's Individual Kumite +68 kg – 1 quota (Hamideh Abbasali)

== Kickboxing ==
Iran has qualified at the 2017 World Games:

- Men's -63.5 kg
- Men's -67 kg
- Men's -75 kg
- Men's -86 kg
- Women's -56 kg
