= Serap Özçelik =

Turkish karateka (born 1988)

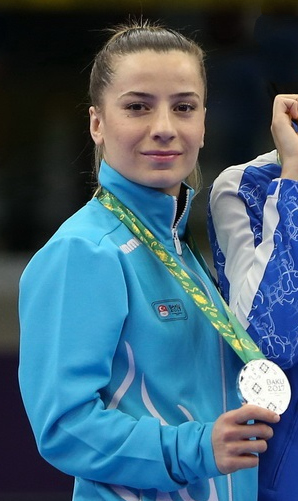
- Özçelik at the 2017 Islamic Solidarity Games
- Born: 18 February 1988 (age 38); Istanbul, Turkey
- Other names: Serap Özçelik Arapoğlu
- Nationality: Turkish
- Division: 50 kg
- Style: Karate, kumite
- Team: EGO SK

Serap Özçelik Arapoğlu (born 18 February 1988) is a Turkish karateka, who competes in the kumite 50–53 kg divisions. She won a world title in 2014 and a European title in 2011, 2012 and 2014.

== Career ==
Özçelik won two bronze medals at the 2012 World Karate Championships in Paris, placing third in women’s kumite 50 kg and taking another bronze with Turkey in the team kumite event after progressing through the repechage bracket.

At the 2014 World Karate Championships in Bremen, Germany, she defeated Duygu Bugur 6–1 in the women’s kumite 50 kg final to win her first senior world title; Turkey also earned bronze in the women’s team kumite.

She won the inaugural European Games gold in women’s kumite 50 kg at Baku 2015, beating Bettina Plank 1–0 in the final after topping Group A and advancing past Kateryna Kryva by judges’ decision in the semifinal; it was Turkey’s first gold medal of the Games.

At the 2017 European Karate Championships in İzmit, she earned bronze in kumite 50 kg, defeating Sara Radichevska 6–0 in the medal bout after a quarterfinal loss to Kateryna Kryva.

She added a European title at Novi Sad 2018, defeating Bettina Plank by judges’ decision after a 1–1 final, and later that year took silver at the 2018 World Karate Championships in Madrid after a 3–1 loss to Miho Miyahara in the world final.

In 2019, she won European bronze in Guadalajara by beating Shara Hubrich 5–0 in the third-place bout.

She represented Turkey at the Tokyo 2020 Olympics in women’s kumite 55 kg, where she was eliminated in the group stage.

At Poreč 2021, she reclaimed the European title in women’s 50 kg, defeating Shara Hubrich in the final.

In 2022, she won the European title again in Gaziantep, beating Erminia Perfetto 9–5 after earlier victories over Lejla Ahmetović (3–0), Inji Azizova (10–2) and Jelena Pehar (5–1). Later that summer she earned bronze at the Konya 2021 Islamic Solidarity Games by defeating Shahmalarani Chandran in the third-place match.
