= 2023 World Karate Championships – Men's 67 kg =

Men's kumite 67 kg at the 2023 World Karate Championships
- Venue: László Papp Budapest Sports Arena
- Location: Budapest, Hungary
- Dates: 25, 28 October
- Competitors: 71 from 71 nations

Medalists
gold medal	Steven Da Costa	France
silver medal	Nenad Dulović	Montenegro
bronze medal	Didar Amirali	Kazakhstan
bronze medal	Fahad Al-Khathami	Saudi Arabia

The men's kumite 67 kg competition at the 2023 World Karate Championships was held on 25 and 28 October 2023.

== Results ==
=== Finals ===
Semifinals
(Kazakhstan) Didar Amirali	0
(France) Steven Da Costa	1
(Germany) Muhammed Özdemir	0
(Montenegro) Nenad Dulović	3

Final
(France) Steven Da Costa	5
(Montenegro) Nenad Dulović	3

=== Repechage ===
Repechage 1
(Tunisia) Laith Haddaji	6
(Uruguay) Juan Macedo	2

Repechage 2
(Tunisia) Laith Haddaji	1
(Jordan) Afeef Ghaith	5

Repechage 3
(Jordan) Afeef Ghaith	5
(Chinese Taipei) Shih Cheng-chung	5

Bronze medal
(Jordan) Afeef Ghaith	1
(Kazakhstan) Didar Amirali	5

Repechage 1
(Switzerland) Noah Pisino	0
(Portugal) Joaquim Mendes	0

Repechage 2
(Portugal) Joaquim Mendes	2
(Saudi Arabia) Fahad Al-Khathami	3

Repechage 3
(Saudi Arabia) Fahad Al-Khathami	5
(Italy) Gianluca De Vivo	3

Bronze medal
(Saudi Arabia) Fahad Al-Khathami	3
(Germany) Muhammed Özdemir	0

=== Top half ===
==== Section 1 ====
First round
(Republic of Ireland) Conor O'Sullivan	0
(Hong Kong) Cheng Hui Pan	1
(Kuwait) Mohammad Al-Otaibi	4
(Philippines) John Matthew Manantan	0

Second round
(Hong Kong) Cheng Hui Pan	2
(Bosnia and Herzegovina) Bakir Grabus	0
(China) Wang Weicheng	1
(Venezuela) Andrés Madera	9
(Turkey) Ömer Abdurrahim Özer	0
(Iceland) Samuel Josh Ramos	0
(Turkmenistan) Dayanch Keletliyev	3
(Azerbaijan) Tural Aghalarzade	9
(Kuwait) Mohammad Al-Otaibi	4
(Croatia) Boran Berak	4
(Morocco) Said Oubaya	4
(Senegal) Cherif Konate	1
(Estonia) Tan Markus Ojala	0
(Armenia) Suren Harutyunyan	8
(Hungary) Yves Martial Tadissi	2
(Kazakhstan) Didar Amirali	4

Third round
(Hong Kong) Cheng Hui Pan	3
(Venezuela) Andrés Madera	1
(Turkey) Ömer Abdurrahim Özer	0
(Azerbaijan) Tural Aghalarzade	1
(Kuwait) Mohammad Al-Otaibi	1
(Morocco) Said Oubaya	1
(Armenia) Suren Harutyunyan	3
(Kazakhstan) Didar Amirali	6

Fourth round
(Hong Kong) Cheng Hui Pan	1
(Azerbaijan) Tural Aghalarzade	8
(Morocco) Said Oubaya	2
(Kazakhstan) Didar Amirali	3

Quarterfinals
(Azerbaijan) Tural Aghalarzade	1
(Kazakhstan) Didar Amirali	2

==== Section 2 ====
First round
(Costa Rica) Keylor Alfaro	1
(Romania) Ștefan Comănescu	3
(Macau) Filipe Ferreira	1
(Czech Republic) Kryštof Ruža	3

Second round
(Romania) Ștefan Comănescu	4
(Cyprus) Marcos Tsangaras	0
(Australia) Rory Attridge	4
(Denmark) Jimmy Jodelli	2
(England) Jed Thompson	7
(Spain) Fernando Delestal	6
(Kenya) James Okinyi	0
(Chinese Taipei) Shih Cheng-chung	8
(Czech Republic) Kryštof Ruža	0
(Canada) Daniel Sanchez Griborio	0
(Jordan) Afeef Ghaith	5
(Curaçao) Jordy Timmermans	0
(Uruguay) Juan Macedo	5
(Slovenia) Erik Košmrlj	2
(Tunisia) Laith Haddaji	4
(France) Steven Da Costa	6

Third round
(Romania) Ștefan Comănescu	6
(Denmark) Jimmy Jodelli	4
(England) Jed Thompson	6
(Chinese Taipei) Shih Cheng-chung	10
(Czech Republic) Kryštof Ruža	4
(Jordan) Afeef Ghaith	7
(Uruguay) Juan Macedo	0
(France) Steven Da Costa	5

Fourth round
(Romania) Ștefan Comănescu	0
(Chinese Taipei) Shih Cheng-chung	3
(Jordan) Afeef Ghaith	0
(France) Steven Da Costa	9

Quarterfinals
(Chinese Taipei) Shih Cheng-chung	1
(France) Steven Da Costa	5

=== Bottom half ===
==== Section 3 ====
First round
(Scotland) Dylan Rush	5
(South Korea) Kim Mu-il	10
(Algeria) Ayoub Anis Helassa	4
(Uzbekistan) Sadriddin Saymatov	0

Second round
(South Korea) Kim Mu-il	0
Akmed Akmedov	8
(Peru) Klaus Hurtado	0
(United States) Brian Ramrup	2
(Brazil) Vinícius Figueira	2
(North Macedonia) Emil Pavlov	2
(Chile) Claudio Ceballo	1
(Egypt) Ali El-Sawy	3
(Algeria) Ayoub Anis Helassa	5
(Iran) Amirreza Borzooei	4
(Qatar) Yaman Al-Natsheh	2
(Mexico) Bernardo Solorzano	3
(Slovakia) Matěj Homola	1
(Germany) Muhammed Özdemir	5
(Oman) Said Al-Shabibi	1
(Japan) Soichiro Nakano	4

Third round
Akmed Akmedov	9
(United States) Brian Ramrup	1
(North Macedonia) Emil Pavlov	0
(Egypt) Ali El-Sawy	2
(Algeria) Ayoub Anis Helassa	1
(Mexico) Bernardo Solorzano	0
(Germany) Muhammed Özdemir	0
(Japan) Soichiro Nakano	0

Fourth round
Akmed Akmedov	3
(Egypt) Ali El-Sawy	1
(Algeria) Ayoub Anis Helassa	0
(Germany) Muhammed Özdemir	1

Quarterfinals
Akmed Akmedov	0
(Germany) Muhammed Özdemir	2

==== Section 4 ====
First round
(Argentina) Gonzalo Navarro	0
(Poland) Miłosz Sabiecki	3

Second round
(Poland) Miłosz Sabiecki	0
(Latvia) Arthur Stepanov	2
(Ukraine) Denys Kopytko	1
(Georgia (country)) Ika Sulamanidze	0
(Serbia) Stefan Joksić	11
(El Salvador) Steven Olivares	2
(Lithuania) Titas Stankūnas	0
(Italy) Gianluca De Vivo	8
(Montenegro) Nenad Dulović	1
(Switzerland) Noah Pisino	0
(Portugal) Joaquim Mendes	7
(Kosovo) Shpresim Shabani	0
(Malaysia) Pillai Sivanesan Geerijaieswaran	2
(Saudi Arabia) Fahad Al-Khathami	8
(Albania) Xhino Toli	1
(Greece) Dionysios Xenos	6

Third round
(Latvia) Arthur Stepanov	1
(Ukraine) Denys Kopytko	2
(Serbia) Stefan Joksić	2
(Italy) Gianluca De Vivo	4
(Montenegro) Nenad Dulović	6
(Portugal) Joaquim Mendes	4
(Saudi Arabia) Fahad Al-Khathami	5
(Greece) Dionysios Xenos	3

Fourth round
(Ukraine) Denys Kopytko	1
(Italy) Gianluca De Vivo	2
(Montenegro) Nenad Dulović	8
(Saudi Arabia) Fahad Al-Khathami	0

Quarterfinals
(Italy) Gianluca De Vivo	0
(Montenegro) Nenad Dulović	5
