= Algeria at the 2017 World Games =

- IOC code: ALG
- NOC: Algerian Olympic Committee

in Wrocław, Poland 20 – 30 July 2017
- Competitors: 6 in 3 sports
- Medals Ranked 39th: Gold 1 Silver 0 Bronze 0 Total 1

World Games appearances
- 1981; 1985; 1989; 1993; 1997; 2001; 2005; 2009; 2013; 2017; 2022; 2025

Algeria competed at the 2017 World Games in Wrocław, Poland from 20 to 30 July 2017.

== Medalists ==
Medal	Name	Sport	Event	Date
Gold	Lamya Matoub	Karate	Women's kumite 68 kg	26 July

== Competitors ==
Sports	Men	Women	Total	Events
Boules Sports	0	1	1	1
Karate	1	3	4	4
Powerlifting	1	0	1	1
Total	2	4	6	6

== Boules sports ==
One athletes qualified for the Algeria to the games.

Athlete	Event	Qualification		Final	
Athlete	Event	Points	Rank	Points	Rank
Samia Touloum	Women's lyonnaise precision	16	5	Did not advance	

== Karate ==
Algeria qualified four athletes in karate.

=== Kata ===
Athlete	Event	Elimination	Standing	Semifinals	Final / BM	
Athlete	Event	Opposition Score	Standing	Opposition Score	Opposition Score	Rank
Manel Kamilia Hadj Said	Women's kata	Pool B (Spain) Sandra Sánchez; L 0–5 HI (Egypt) Sarah Sayed; L 1–4 HI (Japan) Kiyou Shimizu; L 0–5 HI	4	Did not advance		

=== Kumite ===
Athlete	Event	Elimination	Standing	Semifinals	Final / BM	
Athlete	Event	Opposition Score	Standing	Opposition Score	Opposition Score	Rank
Abdelatif Benkhaled	Men's kumite 67 kg	Pool B (Australia) Tsuneari Yahiro; W 1 – 0 PO (Hungary) Yves Martial Tadissi; W 4 – 4 PO (United Kingdom) Jordan Thomas; L 0 – 6 PO	2	(France) Steven Da Costa; L 2 – 5 PO	(Dominican Republic) Deivis Ferreras; L 0 – 8 HU	4
Lydia Besbes	Women's kumite 50 kg	Pool A (Australia) Maria Alexiadis; W 1 – 0 PO (Japan) Miho Miyahara; L 0 – 2 PO (Poland) Magdalena Nowakowska; L 0 – 2 PO	3	did not advance		
Lamya Matoub	Women's kumite 68 kg	Pool B (New Zealand) Amy Thomason; W 3 – 0 PO (Poland) Kamila Warda; W 3 – 0 PO (Austria) Alisa Buchinger; D 0 – 0	2	(Japan) Kayo Someya; W 2 – 1 PO	(Austria) Alisa Buchinger; W 0 – 0 HI	1st place, gold medalist(s)

== Powerlifting ==
Algeria qualified one athlete in powerlifting.

Athlete	Event	Squat		Bench press		Deadlift		Total weight	Total points	Rank
Athlete	Event	Result	Rank	Result	Rank	Result	Rank	Total weight	Total points	Rank
Rabah El Fekair	Men's middleweight	320.0	8	145.0	10	285.0	8	750.0	532,27	10
