= 2022 European Karate Championships – Men's 67 kg =

European Karate Championship

Men's 67 kg at the 2022 European Karate Championships
- Venue: Karataş Şahinbey Sport Hall
- Location: Gaziantep, Turkey
- Dates: 26–28 May
- Competitors: 37 from 37 nations

Medalists
gold medal	Burak Uygur	Turkey
silver medal	Dionysios Xenos	Greece
bronze medal	Joaquim Mendes	Portugal
bronze medal	Steven Da Costa	France

The Men's 67 kg competition at the 2022 European Karate Championships was held from 26 to 28 May 2022.

== Results ==
=== Finals ===
Semifinals
(Portugal) Joaquim Mendes	0
(Turkey) Burak Uygur	1
(France) Steven Da Costa	0
(Greece) Dionysios Xenos	1

Final
(Turkey) Burak Uygur	4
(Greece) Dionysios Xenos	0

=== Repechage ===
Repechage 1
(Serbia) Stefan Joksić	1
Amir Khan	1

Repechage 2
(Serbia) Stefan Joksić	5
(Romania) Ștefan Comanescu	0

Bronze medal
(Serbia) Stefan Joksić	4
(Portugal) Joaquim Mendes	6

Repechage 1
(Estonia) Tan Markus Ojala	2
(Croatia) Boran Berak	5

Repechage 2
(Croatia) Boran Berak	4
(Ukraine) Hnat Pak	1

Bronze medal
(Croatia) Boran Berak	2
(France) Steven Da Costa	6

=== Top half ===
==== Section 1 ====
Round of 64
(Bosnia and Herzegovina) Haris Poljo	0
(Portugal) Joaquim Mendes	5
(Slovenia) Jaka Taler	0
(Azerbaijan) Tural Aghalarzade	2

Round of 32
(Portugal) Joaquim Mendes	2
(Slovakia) Matěj Homola	0
(Belgium) Youness Oualad	2
(Kosovo) Shpresim Shabani	0
(Azerbaijan) Tural Aghalarzade	10
(Iceland) Samuel Josh Ramos	2
(England) Jed Thompson	6
(Sweden) Mohammed Alnmer	1

Round of 16
(Portugal) Joaquim Mendes	3
(Belgium) Youness Oualad	1
(Azerbaijan) Tural Aghalarzade	4
(England) Jed Thompson	1

Quarterfinals
(Portugal) Joaquim Mendes	1
(Azerbaijan) Tural Aghalarzade	0

==== Section 2 ====
Round of 64
(Armenia) Suren Harutyunyan	0
(Serbia) Stefan Joksić	1

Round of 32
(Serbia) Stefan Joksić	1
(Turkey) Burak Uygur	2
(Montenegro) Ognjen Otašević	2
Amir Khan	4
(Germany) Tim Steiner	0
(Latvia) Radijs Kostiļevs	0
(Romania) Ștefan Comanescu	4
(Cyprus) Marcos Tsangaras	1

Round of 16
(Turkey) Burak Uygur	8
Amir Khan	0
(Latvia) Radijs Kostiļevs	0
(Romania) Ștefan Comanescu	2

Quarterfinals
(Turkey) Burak Uygur	2
(Romania) Ștefan Comanescu	1

=== Bottom half ===
==== Section 3 ====
Round of 64
(Italy) Luca Maresca	0
(Denmark) Lucas Busk-Matthiasen	5

Round of 32
(Denmark) Lucas Busk-Matthiasen	2
(Israel) Rom Gaigy	3
(Luxembourg) Yanis Tamim	0
(Spain) Samy Ennkhaili	2
(Switzerland) Matthias Brunner	1
(Poland) Miłosz Sabiecki	0
(Georgia (country)) Luka Khvedeliani	1
(France) Steven Da Costa	10

Round of 16
(Israel) Rom Gaigy	0
(Spain) Samy Ennkhaili	0
(Switzerland) Matthias Brunner	0
(France) Steven Da Costa	8

Quarterfinals
(Israel) Rom Gaigy	0
(France) Steven Da Costa	8

==== Section 4 ====
Round of 64
(Republic of Ireland) Rory Kavanagh	0
(Bulgaria) Vasil Rivov	1

Round of 32
(Bulgaria) Vasil Rivov	1
(North Macedonia) David Petkov	0
(Ukraine) Hnat Pak	2
(Scotland) Dylan Rush	0
(Croatia) Boran Berak	3
(Hungary) Yves Martial Tadissi	0
(Estonia) Tan Markus Ojala	0
(Greece) Dionysios Xenos	5

Round of 16
(Bulgaria) Vasil Rivov	0
(Ukraine) Hnat Pak	10
(Croatia) Boran Berak	1
(Greece) Dionysios Xenos	4

Quarterfinals
(Ukraine) Hnat Pak	2
(Greece) Dionysios Xenos	3
