= 2021 World Karate Championships – Men's 67 kg =

World Karate Championship

Men's kumite 67 kg at the 2021 World Karate Championships
- Venue: Hamdan Sports Complex
- Location: Dubai, United Arab Emirates
- Dates: 17–20 November
- Competitors: 73 from 73 nations

Medalists
gold medal	Steven Da Costa	France
silver medal	Emil Pavlov	North Macedonia
bronze medal	Ali El-Sawy	Egypt
bronze medal	Soichiro Nakano	Japan

The Men's 67 kg competition at the 2021 World Karate Championships was held from 17 to 20 November 2021.

== Results ==
=== Finals ===
Semifinals
(Hungary) Yves Martial Tadissi	3
(North Macedonia) Emil Pavlov	3
(Japan) Soichiro Nakano	2
(France) Steven Da Costa	3

Final
(North Macedonia) Emil Pavlov	0
(France) Steven Da Costa	8

=== Repechage ===
Repechage 1
(Slovakia) Matej Homola	9
(Uzbekistan) Sadriddin Saymatov	7

Repechage 2
(Slovakia) Matej Homola
(Jordan) Abdallah Hammad	3

Repechage 3
(Jordan) Abdallah Hammad	1
(Egypt) Ali El-Sawy	3

Bronze medal
(Egypt) Ali El-Sawy	2
(Hungary) Yves Martial Tadissi	1

Repechage 1
(Curaçao) Jordy Timmermans	3
(Kosovo) Ylli Cenaj	3

Repechage 2
(Curaçao) Jordy Timmermans	0
(Bulgaria) Vasil Rivov	1

Repechage 3
(Bulgaria) Vasil Rivov	1
(Greece) Dionysios Xenos	1

Bronze medal
(Greece) Dionysios Xenos	4
(Japan) Soichiro Nakano	5

=== Top half ===
==== Section 1 ====
First round
Evgeny Plakhutin	1
(Kenya) Fredrick Abubakar	0
(South Korea) Kim Mu-il	0
(Mexico) Daniel Esparza	4
(Morocco) Anass Alami	1
(Israel) Rom Gaigi	0

Second round
Evgeny Plakhutin	6
(Mauritania) EL Yassine Mohamed Aly	0
(Turkmenistan) Baýry Baýryýew	2
(Armenia) Hrachya Yeritsyan	2
(Mexico) Daniel Esparza	0
(Hungary) Yves Martial Tadissi	2
(Serbia) Stefan Joksić	3
(Belgium) Jess Rosiello	1
(Morocco) Anass Alami	7
(United Arab Emirates) Ahmed Al-Hadharim	0
(Bahrain) Ahmed Ali	0
(Kyrgyzstan) Kalysbek Nurlanbek Uulu	6
(Saudi Arabia) Omar Al-Azmi	2
(Kazakhstan) Didar Amirali	2
(Argentina) Gonzalo Navarro	6
Hamoon Derafshipour	3

Third round
Evgeny Plakhutin	4
(Armenia) Hrachya Yeritsyan	0
(Hungary) Yves Martial Tadissi	4
(Serbia) Stefan Joksić	2
(Morocco) Anass Alami	3
(Kyrgyzstan) Kalysbek Nurlanbek Uulu	0
(Saudi Arabia) Omar Al-Azmi	1
(Argentina) Gonzalo Navarro	0

Fourth round
Evgeny Plakhutin	0
(Hungary) Yves Martial Tadissi	1
(Morocco) Anass Alami	4
(Saudi Arabia) Omar Al-Azmi	2

Quarterfinals
(Hungary) Yves Martial Tadissi	2
(Morocco) Anass Alami	1

==== Section 2 ====
First round
(Jordan) Abdallah Hammad	1
(Denmark) Lucas Busk-Matthiasen	1
Worakan Soda	1
(Azerbaijan) Tural Aghalarzade	1

Second round
(Jordan) Abdallah Hammad	5
(Italy) Luca Maresca	3
(Syria) Khalil Salman	9
(Albania) Abdullah Backa	1
(Uzbekistan) Sadriddin Saymatov	3
(Malaysia) Muhammad Arif Afifuddin	0
(Slovakia) Matej Homola	3
(North Macedonia) Emil Pavlov	4
(Azerbaijan) Tural Aghalarzade	4
(Montenegro) Nenad Dulović	4
(Egypt) Ali El-Sawy	2
(Cyprus) Marcos Tsangaras	0
(Georgia (country)) Luka Khvedeliani	8
(Cameroon) Franck Biwono Mbassi	0
(Colombia) José Ramírez	0
(Brazil) Vinícius Figueira	0

Third round
(Jordan) Abdallah Hammad	8
(Syria) Khalil Salman	2
(Uzbekistan) Sadriddin Saymatov	0
(North Macedonia) Emil Pavlov	3
(Azerbaijan) Tural Aghalarzade	1
(Egypt) Ali El-Sawy	6
(Georgia (country)) Luka Khvedeliani	4
(Brazil) Vinícius Figueira	4

Fourth round
(Jordan) Abdallah Hammad	1
(North Macedonia) Emil Pavlov	3
(Egypt) Ali El-Sawy	8
(Georgia (country)) Luka Khvedeliani	3

Quarterfinals
(North Macedonia) Emil Pavlov	4
(Egypt) Ali El-Sawy	1

=== Bottom half ===
==== Section 3 ====
First round
(Croatia) Boran Berak	2
(Latvia) Leon Gaiduk	0
(Bolivia) Leandro Subirana	5
(Jamaica) Khalil Gordon	0

Second round
(Croatia) Boran Berak
(Turkey) Burak Uygur
(Australia) Declan Squire	0
(Austria) Stefan Pokorny	3
(Chinese Taipei) Shih Cheng-chung	6
(England) Jed Thompson	1
(United States) Brian Ramrup	0
(Romania) Ștefan Comănescu	1
(Bolivia) Leandro Subirana	0
(Venezuela) Andrés Madera	5
(Poland) Miłosz Sabiecki	1
(Republic of Ireland) Rory Kavanagh	0
(Japan) Soichiro Nakano	1
(Democratic Republic of the Congo) Samuangala Sesanga	0
(Germany) Tim Steiner	0
(Chile) Camilo Velozo	4

Third round
(Turkey) Burak Uygur	1
(Austria) Stefan Pokorny	0
(Chinese Taipei) Shih Cheng-chung	4
(Romania) Ștefan Comănescu	4
(Venezuela) Andrés Madera	1
(Poland) Miłosz Sabiecki	3
(Japan) Soichiro Nakano	0
(Chile) Camilo Velozo	0

Fourth round
(Turkey) Burak Uygur	3
(Romania) Ștefan Comănescu	0
(Poland) Miłosz Sabiecki	0
(Japan) Soichiro Nakano	3

Quarterfinals
(Turkey) Burak Uygur	1
(Japan) Soichiro Nakano	3

==== Section 4 ====
First round
(Greece) Dionysios Xenos	1
(Lithuania) Tomas Balčius	0
(Kuwait) Ali Abdulaziz	0
(India) Pranay Sharma	5

Second round
(Greece) Dionysios Xenos	1
(Hong Kong) Chung Yeung Chuen	0
(Switzerland) Matthias Brunner	7
(Belarus) Artsiom Krautsou	3
(Spain) Samy Ennkahili	0
(Algeria) Ayoub Anis Helassa	0
(Ecuador) Anthony Intriago	1
(Ukraine) Hnat Pak	6
(India) Pranay Sharma	4
(Iraq) Mohammed Omar	2
(Bosnia and Herzegovina) Eldin Hajdarpašić	0
(Bulgaria) Vasil Rivov	1
(Kosovo) Ylli Cenaj	3
(South Africa) William Ash	2
(Curaçao) Jordy Timmermans	0
(France) Steven Da Costa	4

Third round
(Greece) Dionysios Xenos	1
(Switzerland) Matthias Brunner	0
(Spain) Samy Ennkahili	5
(Ukraine) Hnat Pak	7
(India) Pranay Sharma	0
(Bulgaria) Vasil Rivov	1
(Kosovo) Ylli Cenaj	0
(France) Steven Da Costa	2

Fourth round
(Greece) Dionysios Xenos	1
(Ukraine) Hnat Pak	0
(Bulgaria) Vasil Rivov	0
(France) Steven Da Costa	3

Quarterfinals
(Greece) Dionysios Xenos	2
(France) Steven Da Costa	4
