= 2023 European Karate Championships – Men's 67 kg =

European Karate Championship

Men's 67 kg at the 2023 European Karate Championships
- Venue: Palacio Multiusos de Guadalajara
- Location: Guadalajara, Spain
- Dates: 23, 25 March
- Competitors: 31 from 31 nations

Medalists
gold medal	Steven Da Costa	France
silver medal	Dionysios Xenos	Greece
bronze medal	Burak Uygur	Turkey
bronze medal	Tural Aghalarzade	Azerbaijan

The Men's 67 kg competition at the 2023 European Karate Championships was held on 23 and 25 March 2023.

== Results ==
=== Finals ===
Semifinals
(Turkey) Burak Uygur	0
(Greece) Dionysios Xenos	1
(Azerbaijan) Tural Aghalarzade	0
(France) Steven Da Costa	2

Final
(Greece) Dionysios Xenos	2
(France) Steven Da Costa	4

=== Repechage ===
Repechage 1
(Belgium) Nasreddine Ajaray	4
(Spain) Fernando Delestal	7

Repechage 2
(Spain) Fernando Delestal	11
(England) Jed Thompson	3

Bronze medal
(Spain) Fernando Delestal	0
(Turkey) Burak Uygur	5

Repechage
(Italy) Luca Maresca	4
(Switzerland) Noah Pisino	0

Bronze medal
(Italy) Luca Maresca	1
(Azerbaijan) Tural Aghalarzade	2

=== Top half ===
==== Section 1 ====
Round of 32
(Bosnia and Herzegovina) Amin Klino	0
(Albania) Xhino Toli	10
(Armenia) Suren Harutyunyan	6
(Portugal) Joaquim Mendes	5
(Denmark) Jimmy Jodelli	1
(Republic of Ireland) Conor O'Sullivan	0
(Sweden) Mohammed Alnmer	1
(Turkey) Burak Uygur	2

Round of 16
(Albania) Xhino Toli	3
(Armenia) Suren Harutyunyan	1
(Denmark) Jimmy Jodelli	0
(Turkey) Burak Uygur	5

Quarterfinals
(Albania) Xhino Toli	4
(Turkey) Burak Uygur	5

==== Section 2 ====
Round of 32
(Germany) Tim Steiner	0
(England) Jed Thompson	1
(Serbia) Stefan Joksić	0
(Croatia) Boran Berak	2
(Spain) Fernando Delestal	8
(Estonia) Markus Ojala Tan	2
(Belgium) Nasreddine Ajaray	0
(Greece) Dionysios Xenos	2

Round of 16
(England) Jed Thompson	6
(Croatia) Boran Berak	3
(Spain) Fernando Delestal	1
(Greece) Dionysios Xenos	3

Quarterfinals
(England) Jed Thompson	0
(Greece) Dionysios Xenos	1

=== Bottom half ===
==== Section 3 ====
Round of 32
(North Macedonia) Emil Pavlov	4
(Ukraine) Denys Kopytko	2
(Romania) Ștefan Comănescu	0
(Azerbaijan) Tural Aghalarzade	0
(Poland) Miłosz Sabiecki	2
(Slovenia) Niklas Tamše	4
(Latvia) Artur Stepanov	3
(Hungary) Yves Martial Tadissi	4

Round of 16
(North Macedonia) Emil Pavlov	0
(Azerbaijan) Tural Aghalarzade	6
(Slovenia) Niklas Tamše	2
(Hungary) Yves Martial Tadissi	1

Quarterfinals
(Azerbaijan) Tural Aghalarzade	2
(Hungary) Yves Martial Tadissi	2

==== Section 4 ====
Round of 32
(Cyprus) Marcos Tsangaras	4
(Slovakia) Matěj Homola	1
(Georgia (country)) Ika Sulamanidze	2
(Switzerland) Noah Pisino	3
(Italy) Luca Maresca	8
(Scotland) Dylan Rush	0

Round of 16
(Cyprus) Marcos Tsangaras	1
(Switzerland) Noah Pisino	4
(Italy) Luca Maresca	1
(France) Steven Da Costa	3

Quarterfinals
(Switzerland) Noah Pisino	0
(France) Steven Da Costa	4
