= Karate at the 2025 World Games – Men's kumite 67 kg =

Men's kumite 67 kg at the 2025 World Games
- Venue: Jianyang Cultural and Sports Centre Gymnasium
- Location: Chengdu, China
- Dates: 8 August
- Competitors: 8 from 8 nations

Medalists
gold medal	Said Oubaya	Morocco
silver medal	Yugo Kozaki	Japan
bronze medal	Abdelrahman Al-Masatfa	Jordan

The men's kumite 67 kg competition in karate at the 2025 World Games took place on 8 August 2025 at the Jianyang Cultural and Sports Centre Gymnasium in Chengdu, China.

== Results ==
=== Pool round ===
==== Pool A ====
Pos	Athlete	B	W	D	D^{0}	L	Pts	Score	(Saudi Arabia)	(Morocco)	(Brazil)	(Kazakhstan)
1	Fahad Al-Khathami (KSA)	3	2	0	0	1	6 (Note: Al-Khathami (KSA) 4–3 Oubaya (MAR))	9–5	—	4–3	5–0	0–2
2	Said Oubaya (MAR)	3	2	0	0	1	6	22–14	3–4	—	11–10	8–0
3	Vinícius Figueira (BRA)	3	1	0	0	2	3 (Note: Figueira (BRA) 3–1 Amirali (KAZ))	13–17	0–5	10–11	—	3–1
4	Didar Amirali (KAZ)	3	1	0	0	2	3	3–11	2–0	0–8	1–3	—

Source: Chengdu 2025

==== Pool B ====
Pos	Athlete	B	W	D	D^{0}	L	Pts	Score	(Jordan)	(Japan)	(Montenegro)	(Turkey)
1	Abdelrahman Al-Masatfa (JOR)	3	3	0	0	0	9	14–4	—	2–1	3–3	9–0
2	Yugo Kozaki (JPN)	3	1	0	1	1	3	6–6	1–2	—	5–4	0–0
3	Nenad Dulović (MNE)	3	0	0	1	2	0 (Note: Dulović (MNE) 0–0 Özer (TUR). Scores obtained: Dulović 7, Özer 0.)	7–8	3–3	4–5	—	0–0
4	Ömer Abdurrahim Özer (TUR)	3	0	0	2	1	0	0–9	0–9	0–0	0–0	—

Source: Chengdu 2025

=== Finals ===
Semi-finals
Yugo Kozaki (JPN)	3
Fahad Al-Khathami (KSA)	1
Said Oubaya (MAR)	8
Abdelrahman Al-Masatfa (JOR)	2

Gold medal bout
Yugo Kozaki (JPN)	3
Said Oubaya (MAR)	4
Bronze medal bout
Fahad Al-Khathami (KSA)	0
Abdelrahman Al-Masatfa (JOR)	10
