= 2025 World Karate Championships – Men's 67 kg =

Men's kumite 67 kg at the 2025 World Karate Championships
- Venue: Cairo Stadium Indoor Halls Complex
- Location: Cairo, Egypt
- Dates: 27–30 November
- Competitors: 31

Medalists
gold medal	Afeef Ghaith	Jordan
silver medal	Said Oubaya	Morocco
bronze medal	Abdul Vakhkhob Rashidov	Uzbekistan
bronze medal	Didar Amirali	Kazakhstan

The men's kumite 67 kg competition at the 2025 World Karate Championships was held from 27 to 30 November 2025.

== Results ==
=== Group phase ===
==== Group A ====
Pos	Athlete	B	W	D	D^{0}	L	Pts	Score	(Jordan)	(France)	(Guatemala)	(Rwanda)
1	Afeef Ghaith (JOR)	3	3	0	0	0	9	14–5	—	2–1	5–4	7–0
2	Younesse Salmi (FRA)	3	2	0	0	1	6	8–4	1–2	—	5–2	2–0
3	Carlos Chacón (GUA)	3	1	0	0	2	3	12–13	4–5	2–5	—	6–3
4	Fiston Ntwari (RWA)	3	0	0	0	3	0	3–15	0–7	0–2	3–6	—

==== Group B ====
Pos	Athlete	B	W	D	D^{0}	L	Pts	Score	(Germany)	(Kazakhstan)	(Turkey)	(South Africa)
1	Muhammed Özdemir (GER)	3	2	0	0	1	6 (Note: Özdemir (GER) 1–1, Amirali (KAZ) 1–1, Özer (TUR) 1–1. Scores obtained: Özdemir 12, Özer 11, Amirali 10. Amirali 2–2 Özer.)	12–8	—	2–1	5–5	5–2
2	Didar Amirali (KAZ)	3	2	0	0	1	6	10–4	1–2	—	2–2	7–0
3	Ömer Abdurrahim Özer (TUR) [3]	3	2	0	0	1	6	11–10	5–5	2–2	—	4–3
4	Jody Williams (RSA)	3	0	0	0	3	0	5–16	2–5	0–7	3–4	—

==== Group C ====
Pos	Athlete	B	W	D	D^{0}	L	Pts	Score	(Uzbekistan)	(Portugal)	(Montenegro)	(New Zealand)
1	Abdul Vakhkhob Rashidov (UZB)	3	3	0	0	0	9	20–4	—	8–0	5–1	7–3
2	Joaquim Mendes (POR)	3	2	0	0	1	6	5–11	0–8	—	2–2	3–1
3	Nenad Dulović (MNE)	3	1	0	0	2	3	10–10	1–5	2–2	—	7–3
4	Reo Takeuchi (NZL)	3	0	0	0	3	0	7–17	3–7	1–3	3–7	—

==== Group D ====
Pos	Athlete	B	W	D	D^{0}	L	Pts	Score		(Japan)	(Poland)	(Canada)
1	Iurik Ogannisian (WKF-1)	3	3	0	0	0	9	9–7	—	4–4	1–0	4–3
2	Yugo Kozaki (JPN) [2]	3	2	0	0	1	6	13–8	4–4	—	4–0	5–4
3	Dominik Dziuda (POL)	3	1	0	0	2	3	4–7	0–1	0–4	—	4–2
4	Karim Ebraheem (CAN)	3	0	0	0	3	0	9–13	3–4	4–5	2–4	—

==== Group E ====
Pos	Athlete	B	W	D	D^{0}	L	Pts	Score	(Chile)	(Saudi Arabia)	(Australia)	(Azerbaijan)
1	Tomás Freire (CHI)	3	2	0	0	1	6 (Note: Freire (CHI) 4–1 Al-Assiri (KSA))	8–7	—	4–1	3–1	1–5
2	Mohammed Al-Assiri (KSA)	3	2	0	0	1	6	9–5	1–4	—	6–0	2–1
3	Rory Attridge (AUS)	3	1	0	0	2	3 (Note: Attridge (AUS) 8–6 Rzazade (AZE))	9–15	1–3	0–6	—	8–6
4	Nuran Rzazade (AZE)	3	1	0	0	2	3	12–11	5–1	1–2	6–8	—

==== Group F ====
Pos	Athlete	B	W	D	D^{0}	L	Pts	Score	(Algeria)	(Italy)	(Chinese Taipei)	(Brazil)
1	Ayoub Anis Helassa (ALG)	3	2	0	0	1	6 (Note: Helassa (ALG) 3–3 Maresca (ITA))	11–8	—	3–3	6–2	2–3
2	Luca Maresca (ITA)	3	2	0	0	1	6	10–5	3–3	—	2–2	5–0
3	Shih Cheng-chung (TPE)	3	1	0	0	2	3 (Note: Shih (TPE) 6–6 Figueira (BRA))	10–14	2–6	2–2	—	6–6
4	Vinícius Figueira (BRA) [4]	3	1	0	0	2	3	9–13	3–2	0–5	6–6	—

==== Group G ====
Pos	Athlete	B	W	D	D^{0}	L	Pts	Score	(Egypt)	(Greece)	(Hong Kong)	(United States)
1	Ali El-Sawy (EGY)	2	2	0	0	0	6	6–1	—	2–0	4–1	–
2	Georgios Baliotis (GRE)	2	1	0	0	1	3	9–5	0–2	—	9–3	–
3	Cheng Hui Pan (HKG)	2	0	0	0	2	0	4–13	1–4	3–9	—	–
—	~~Evangelos Akde (USA)~~	0	0	0	0	0	0	–	–	–	–	—

==== Group H ====
Pos	Athlete	B	W	D	D^{0}	L	Pts	Score	(Morocco)	(Serbia)	(Iran)	(Moldova)
1	Said Oubaya (MAR) [1]	3	3	0	0	0	9	16–1	—	3–0	9–1	4–0
2	Stefan Joksić (SRB)	3	2	0	0	1	6	5–6	0–3	—	2–1	3–2
3	Amirreza Borzooei (IRI)	3	1	0	0	2	3	9–11	1–9	1–2	—	7–0
4	Alexandr Capmoale (MDA)	3	0	0	0	3	0	2–14	0–4	2–3	0–7	—

=== Elimination phase ===
Round of 16; 27 November
Stefan Joksić (SRB)	0
Afeef Ghaith (JOR)	3
Georgios Baliotis (GRE)	2
Muhammed Özdemir (GER)	0
Luca Maresca (ITA)	0
Abdul Vakhkhob Rashidov (UZB)	0
Mohammed Al-Assiri (KSA)	0
Iurik Ogannisian (WKF-1)	1
Yugo Kozaki (JPN)	0
Tomás Freire (CHI)	4
Joaquim Mendes (POR)	3
Ayoub Anis Helassa (ALG)	8
Didar Amirali (KAZ)	5
Ali El-Sawy (EGY)	4
Younesse Salmi (FRA)	0
Said Oubaya (MAR)	4

Quarterfinals; 29 November
Afeef Ghaith (JOR)	5
Georgios Baliotis (GRE)	3
Abdul Vakhkhob Rashidov (UZB)	3
Iurik Ogannisian (WKF-1)	1
Tomás Freire (CHI)	3
Ayoub Anis Helassa (ALG)	2
Didar Amirali (KAZ)	5
Said Oubaya (MAR)	5

Semifinals; 29 November
Afeef Ghaith (JOR)	6
Abdul Vakhkhob Rashidov (UZB)	0
Tomás Freire (CHI)	3
Said Oubaya (MAR)	7

Final; 30 November
Afeef Ghaith (JOR)	6
Said Oubaya (MAR)	0

Bronze medals 30 November
Georgios Baliotis (GRE)	4
Abdul Vakhkhob Rashidov (UZB)	9
Didar Amirali (KAZ)	0
Tomás Freire (CHI)	0
