= Karate at the 2015 European Games – Men's kumite 67 kg =

Karate competition

Men's kumite 67 kg at the 2015 European Games
- Venue: Baku Crystal Hall
- Date: 13 June
- Competitors: 8 from 8 nations

Medalists
gold medal	Burak Uygur	Turkey
silver medal	Steven Da Costa	France
bronze medal	Niyazi Aliyev	Azerbaijan

The men's kumite 67 kg competition at the 2015 European Games in Baku, Azerbaijan was held on 13 June 2015 at the Crystal Hall.

== Schedule ==
All times are Azerbaijan Summer Time (UTC+5).

Date	Time	Event
Saturday, 13 June 2015	11:00	Elimination Round
Saturday, 13 June 2015	16:00	Semifinals
Saturday, 13 June 2015	18:00	Finals

== Results ==
Legend

- KK — Forfeit (Kiken)

=== Elimination round ===
==== Group A ====
Athlete	Pld	W	D	L	Points		
Athlete	Pld	W	D	L	GF	GA	Diff
Niyazi Aliyev (AZE)	3	3	0	0	7	1	+6
Steven Da Costa (FRA)	3	2	0	1	12	5	+7
Manuel Rasero (ESP)	3	1	0	2	7	13	-6
Irakli Tkebuchava (GEO)	3	0	0	3	1	8	-7

	Score	
Niyazi Aliyev (AZE)	2–0	Irakli Tkebuchava (GEO)
Manuel Rasero (ESP)	2–10	Steven Da Costa (FRA)
Niyazi Aliyev (AZE)	3–1	Steven Da Costa (FRA)
Manuel Rasero (ESP)	5–1	Irakli Tkebuchava (GEO)
Irakli Tkebuchava (GEO)	0–1	Steven Da Costa (FRA)
Niyazi Aliyev (AZE)	2–0	Manuel Rasero (ESP)

==== Group B ====
Athlete	Pld	D	W	L	Points		
Athlete	Pld	D	W	L	GF	GA	Diff
Ricardo Giegler (GER)	3	2	1	0	3	1	+2
Burak Uygur (TUR)	3	1	1	1	2	1	+1
Yves Martial Tadissi (HUN)	3	1	0	2	2	4	-2
Danil Domdjoni (CRO)	3	0	2	1	0	1	-1

	Score	
Burak Uygur (TUR)	2–0	Yves Martial Tadissi (HUN)
Danil Domdjoni (CRO)	0–0	Ricardo Giegler (GER)
Burak Uygur (TUR)	0–1	Ricardo Giegler (GER)
Danil Domdjoni (CRO)	0–1	Yves Martial Tadissi (HUN)
Yves Martial Tadissi (HUN)	1–2	Ricardo Giegler (GER)
Burak Uygur (TUR)	0–0	Danil Domdjoni (CRO)

=== Finals ===
Semifinals
Niyazi Aliyev (AZE)	1
Burak Uygur (TUR)	4
Steven Da Costa (FRA)	4
Ricardo Giegler (GER)	2

Gold medal match
Burak Uygur (TUR)	3
Steven Da Costa (FRA)	3
Bronze medal match
Niyazi Aliyev (AZE)	3
Ricardo Giegler (GER)	1
