= 2024 European Karate Championships – Men's 67 kg =

European Karate Championship

Men's 67 kg at the 2024 European Karate Championships
- Venue: Krešimir Ćosić Hall
- Location: Zadar, Croatia
- Dates: 9, 11 May
- Competitors: 33 from 33 nations

Medalists
gold medal	Yves Martial Tadissi	Hungary
silver medal	Nenad Dulović	Montenegro
bronze medal	Huseyn Mammadli	Azerbaijan
bronze medal	Georgios Baliotis	Greece

The Men's 67 kg competition at the 2024 European Karate Championships was held on 9 and 11 May 2024.

== Results ==
=== Finals ===
Semifinals
(Portugal) Joaquim Mendes	4
(Hungary) Yves Martial Tadissi	8
(Montenegro) Nenad Dulović	6
(Croatia) Boban Berak	3

Final
(Hungary) Yves Martial Tadissi	1
(Montenegro) Nenad Dulović	1

=== Repechage ===
Repechage 1
(Slovakia) Matěj Homola	4
(Cyprus) Marcos Tsangaras	6

Repechage 2
(Cyprus) Marcos Tsangaras	0
(Azerbaijan) Huseyn Mammadli	8

Bronze medal
(Azerbaijan) Huseyn Mammadli	3
(Portugal) Joaquim Mendes	1

Repechage 1
(Germany) Muhammed Özdemir	2
(Poland) Miłosz Sabiecki	0

Repechage 2
(Germany) Muhammed Özdemir	3
(Greece) Georgios Baliotis	4

Bronze medal
(Greece) Georgios Baliotis	5
(Croatia) Boran Berak	2

=== Top half ===
==== Section 1 ====
Round of 64
Farzad Rostami	1
(Georgia (country)) Anzor Donadze	6

Round of 32
(Georgia (country)) Anzor Donadze	2
(Spain) Xavier Santos	1
(France) Younesse Salmi	10
(England) Joby Wilson	0
(Scotland) Dylan Rush	5
(Serbia) Stefan Joksić	5
(Armenia) Suren Harutyunyan	4
(Portugal) Joaquim Mendes	4

Round of 16
(Georgia (country)) Anzor Donadze	5
(France) Younesse Salmi	5
(Scotland) Dylan Rush	0
(Portugal) Joaquim Mendes	5

Quarterfinals
(France) Younesse Salmi	5
(Portugal) Joaquim Mendes	5

==== Section 2 ====
Round of 64

Round of 32
(Slovakia) Matěj Homola	4
(Hungary) Yves Martial Tadissi	6
(Albania) Abdullah Backa	6
(Cyprus) Marcos Tsangaras	6
(North Macedonia) Emil Pavlov	3
Artsiom Krautsou	1
(Azerbaijan) Huseyn Mammadli	5
(Turkey) Ömer Abdurrahim Özer	3

Round of 16
(Hungary) Yves Martial Tadissi	5
(Cyprus) Marcos Tsangaras	5
(North Macedonia) Emil Pavlov	1
(Azerbaijan) Huseyn Mammadli	7

Quarterfinals
(Hungary) Yves Martial Tadissi	3
(Azerbaijan) Huseyn Mammadli	2

=== Bottom half ===
==== Section 3 ====
Round of 64

Round of 32
(Greece) Georgios Baliotis	3
(Latvia) Artur Stepanov	1
(Romania) Ştefan Comănescu	1
(Luxembourg) Yanis Tamim	4
(Kosovo) Shpresim Shabani	1
(Poland) Miłosz Sabiecki	3
(Montenegro) Nenad Dulović	3
(Germany) Muhammed Özdemir	3

Round of 16
(Greece) Georgios Baliotis	3
(Luxembourg) Yanis Tamim	1
(Poland) Miłosz Sabiecki	0
(Montenegro) Nenad Dulović	3

Quarterfinals
(Greece) Georgios Baliotis	3
(Montenegro) Nenad Dulović	1

==== Section 4 ====
Round of 64

Round of 32
(Estonia) Tan Markus Ojala	0
(Bosnia and Herzegovina) Bekir Grabus	1
(Austria) Andrej Tvrdon	5
(Republic of Ireland) Conor O'Sullivan	0
(Croatia) Boban Berak	8
(Ukraine) Hnat Pak	3
(Denmark) Marcus Kjærbøl	5
(Italy) Luca Maresca	4

Round of 16
(Bosnia and Herzegovina) Bekir Grabus	3
(Austria) Andrej Tvrdon	2
(Croatia) Boban Berak	3
(Denmark) Marcus Kjærbøl	1

Quarterfinals
(Bosnia and Herzegovina) Bekir Grabus	0
(Croatia) Boban Berak	9
