= Karate at the 2017 World Games – Men's kumite 67 kg =

Men's Kumite 67kg at the 2017 World Games
- Venue: GEM Sports Complex
- Date: 25 July 2017
- Competitors: 8 from 8 nations

Medalists
1st place, gold medalist(s)		(France) Steven Da Costa
2nd place, silver medalist(s)		(United Kingdom) Jordan Thomas
3rd place, bronze medalist(s)		(Dominican Republic) Deivis Ferreras

The men's kumite 67 kg competition in karate at the 2017 World Games took place on 25 July 2017 at the GEM Sports Complex in Wrocław, Poland.

== Results ==
=== Elimination round ===
==== Group A ====
Rank	Athlete	B	W	D	L	Pts	Score
1	Steven Da Costa (FRA)	2	2	0	0	4	10–1
2	Deivis Ferreras (DOM)	2	1	0	1	2	3–4
3	Andres Madera (VEN)	2	0	0	2	0	1–9

	Score	
Steven Da Costa (FRA)	3–1	Deivis Ferreras (DOM)
Steven Da Costa (FRA)	7–0	Andres Madera (VEN)
Deivis Ferreras (DOM)	2–1	Andres Madera (VEN)

==== Group B ====
Rank	Athlete	B	W	D	L	Pts	Score
1	Jordan Thomas (GBR)	3	2	1	0	5	9–2
2	Abdelatif Benkhaled (ALG)	3	2	0	1	4	10–4
3	Yves Martial Tadissi (HUN)	3	1	0	2	2	7–2
4	Tsuneari Yahiro (AUS)	3	0	1	2	1	2–1

	Score	
Tsuneari Yahiro (AUS)	0–1	Abdelatif Benkhaled (ALG)
Jordan Thomas (GBR)	3–2	Yves Martial Tadissi (HUN)
Tsuneari Yahiro (AUS)	0–0	Jordan Thomas (GBR)
Abdelatif Benkhaled (ALG)	4–4	Yves Martial Tadissi (HUN)
Tsuneari Yahiro (AUS)	0–1	Yves Martial Tadissi (HUN)
Abdelatif Benkhaled (ALG)	0–6	Jordan Thomas (GBR)

=== Finals ===
Semifinals
Steven Da Costa (FRA)	5
Abdelatif Benkhaled (ALG)	2
Jordan Thomas (GBR)	8
Deivis Ferreras (DOM)	0

Final
Steven Da Costa (FRA)	0
Jordan Thomas (GBR)	0
Third place
Abdelatif Benkhaled (ALG)	0
Deivis Ferreras (DOM)	8
