= Steven Da Costa =

French karateka (born 1997)

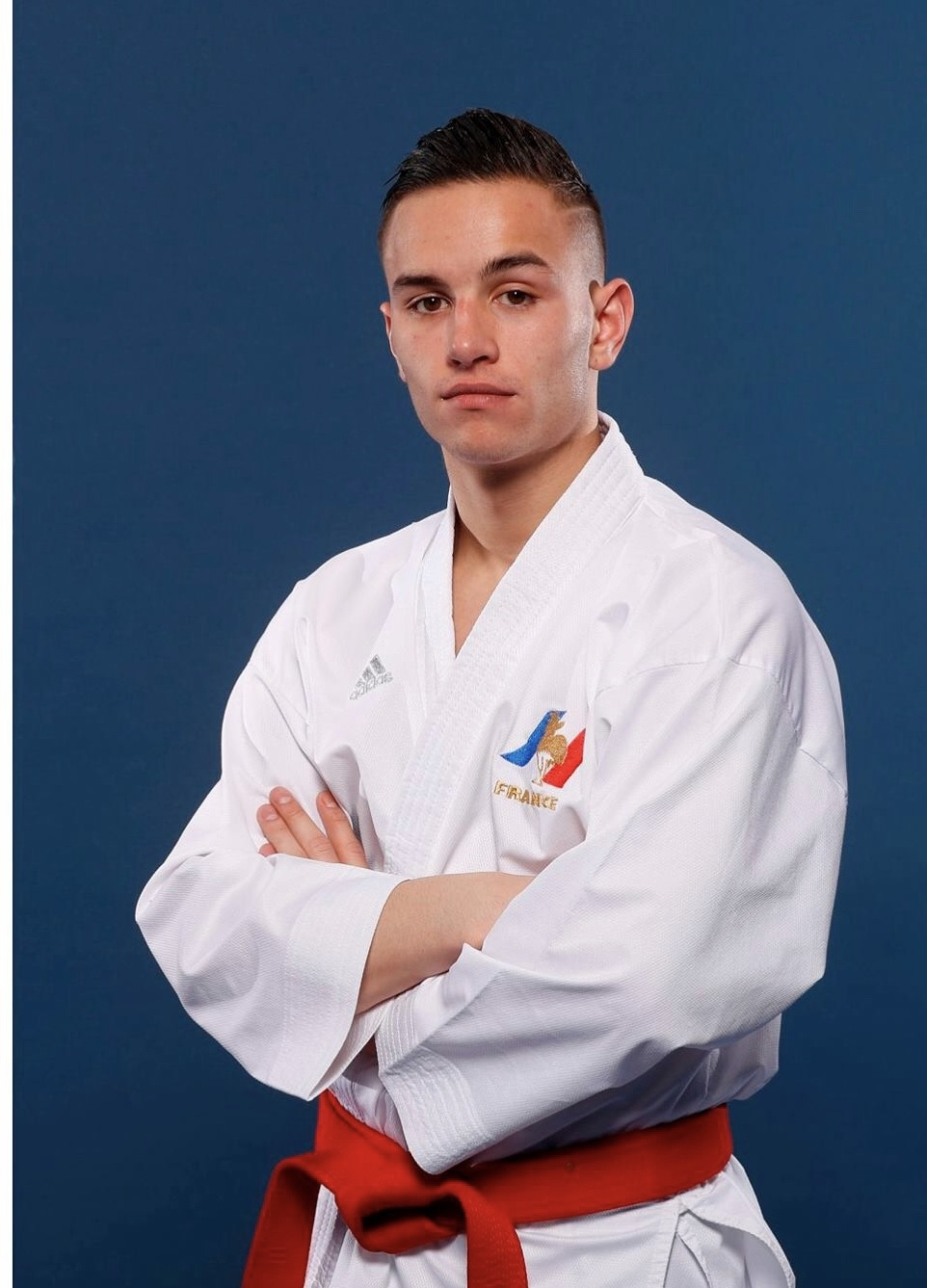
- Da Costa in 2018

Personal information
- Born: 23 January 1997 (age 29) Mont-Saint-Martin, France

Sport
- Country: France
- Sport: Karate
- Weight class: 67 kg
- Events: Kumite; Team kumite
Medal record
Men's karate
Representing France
Olympic Games
Gold medal – first place	2020 Tokyo	67 kg
World Championships
Gold medal – first place	2018 Madrid	67 kg
Gold medal – first place	2021 Dubai	67 kg
Gold medal – first place	2023 Budapest	67 kg
Bronze medal – third place	2016 Linz	67 kg
Bronze medal – third place	2016 Linz	Team kumite
Bronze medal – third place	2023 Budapest	Team kumite
European Championships
Gold medal – first place	2016 Montpellier	67 kg
Gold medal – first place	2016 Montpellier	Team kumite
Gold medal – first place	2019 Guadalajara	67 kg
Gold medal – first place	2022 Gaziantep	Team kumite
Gold medal – first place	2023 Guadalajara	67 kg
Silver medal – second place	2017 İzmit	Team kumite
Silver medal – second place	2023 Guadalajara	Team kumite
Bronze medal – third place	2021 Poreč	67 kg
Bronze medal – third place	2022 Gaziantep	67 kg
European Games
Silver medal – second place	2015 Baku	67 kg
World Games
Gold medal – first place	2017 Wrocław	67 kg

Steven Da Costa, sometimes written as Steven Dacosta (born 23 January 1997) is a French karateka. He won the gold medal in the men's 67 kg event at the 2020 Summer Olympics held in Tokyo, Japan. He is a three-time gold medalist in the men's 67 kg event at the World Karate Championships (2018, 2021, and 2023). He is also a three-time gold medalist in this event at the European Karate Championships (2016, 2019, and 2023).

== Career ==
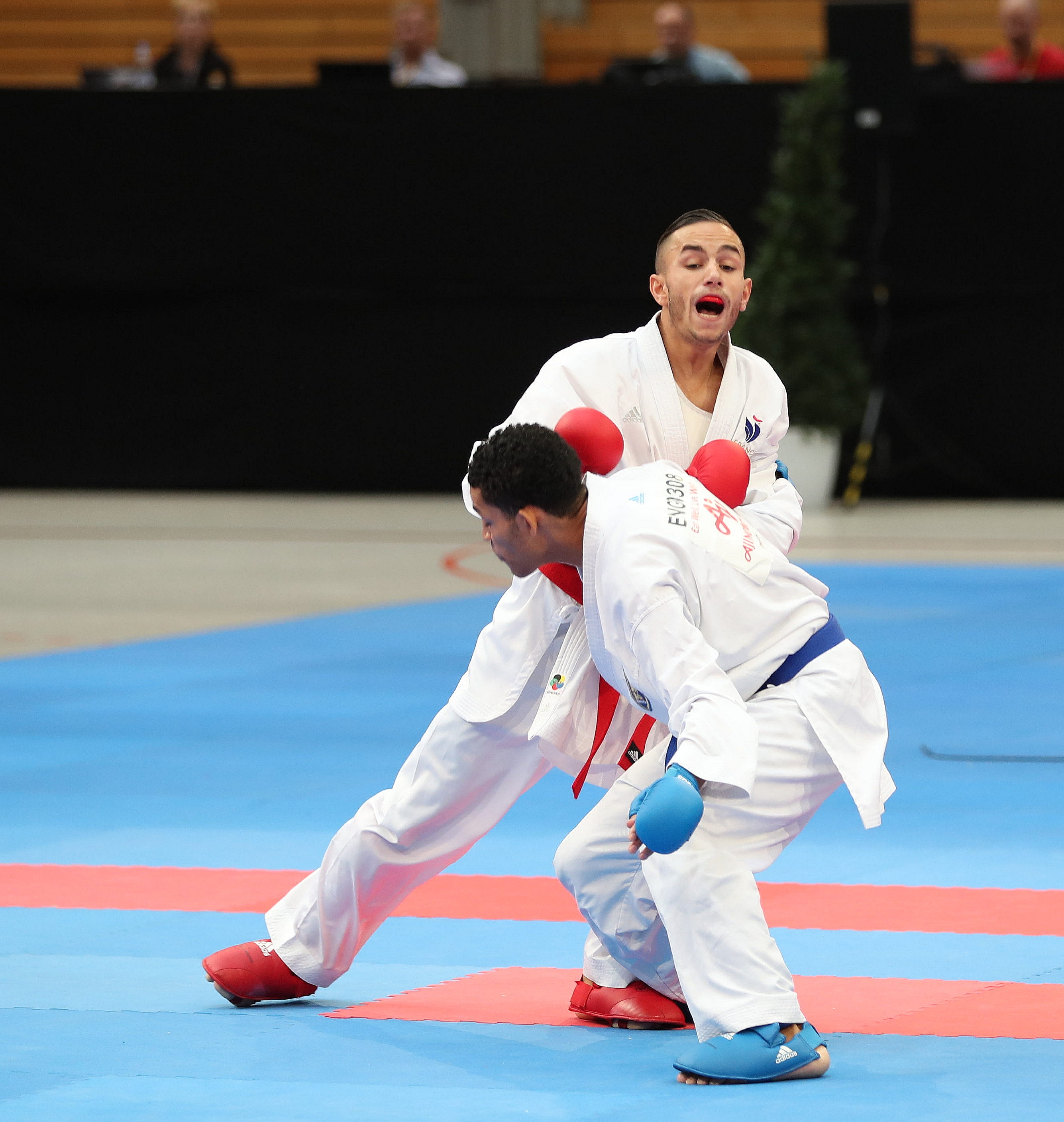
Da Costa at the Karate 1 Premier League 2018 in Berlin

At the 2015 European Games held in Baku, Azerbaijan, he won the silver medal in the men's kumite 67 kg event. In the final, he lost against Burak Uygur of Turkey.

In 2016, Da Costa won the silver medal in the under-21 men's 67 kg event at the EKF Cadet, Junior and under-21 Championships held in Limassol, Cyprus. A few months later, he won the gold medal in the men's kumite 67 kg event at the European Karate Championships held in Montpelier, France. He also won the gold medal in the men's team kumite event. At the World University Karate Championships held in Braga, Portugal, he won the gold medal in the men's kumite 67 kg event. A few months later, at the World Karate Championships held in Linz, Austria, he won one of the bronze medals in both the men's kumite 67 kg and men's team kumite events.

In 2017, Da Costa won the silver medal in the men's team kumite event at the European Karate Championships held in İzmit, Turkey. In the same year, at the World Games held in Wrocław, Poland, he won the gold medal in the men's kumite 67 kg event. In the final, he defeated Jordan Thomas of Great Britain. At the 2018 World Karate Championships held in Madrid, Spain, he won the gold medal in the men's 67 kg event. In the final, he defeated Vinícius Figueira of Brazil. The following year, Da Costa also won the gold medal in the men's kumite 67 kg event at the 2019 European Karate Championships held in Guadalajara, Spain.

In May 2021, Da Costa won one of the bronze medals in the men's kumite 67 kg event at the European Karate Championships held in Poreč, Croatia. In August 2021, he represented France at the 2020 Summer Olympics in Tokyo, Japan. He won the gold medal by defeating Eray Şamdan of Turkey in the final of the men's 67 kg event. Da Costa was also the flag bearer for France during the closing ceremony. In November 2021, he won the gold medal in the men's 67 kg event at the World Karate Championships held in Dubai, United Arab Emirates.

He won one of the bronze medals in the men's 67 kg event at the 2022 European Karate Championships held in Gaziantep, Turkey. He also won the gold medal in the men's team kumite event.

Da Costa won the gold medal in the men's 67 kg event at the 2023 European Karate Championships held in Guadalajara, Spain. He also won the silver medal in the men's team kumite event. He won the gold medal in the men's 67 kg event at the 2023 World Karate Championships held in Budapest, Hungary.

== Personal life ==
His brothers Logan Da Costa and Jessie Da Costa also compete in karate. He is of Portuguese descent.

Da Costa now coaches in Karate Club Strassen, Luxembourg.

== Achievements ==
Year	Competition	Venue	Rank	Event
2015	European Games	Baku, Azerbaijan	2nd	Kumite 67 kg
2016	European Championships	Montpellier, France	1st	Kumite 67 kg
2016	European Championships	Montpellier, France	1st	Team kumite
2016	World Championships	Linz, Austria	3rd	Kumite 67 kg
2016	World Championships	Linz, Austria	3rd	Team kumite
2017	European Championships	İzmit, Turkey	2nd	Team kumite
2017	World Games	Wrocław, Poland	1st	Kumite 67 kg
2018	World Championships	Madrid, Spain	1st	Kumite 67 kg
2019	European Championships	Guadalajara, Spain	1st	Kumite 67 kg
2021	European Championships	Poreč, Croatia	3rd	Kumite 67 kg
2021	Summer Olympics	Tokyo, Japan	1st	Kumite 67 kg
2021	World Championships	Dubai, United Arab Emirates	1st	Kumite 67 kg
2022	European Championships	Gaziantep, Turkey	3rd	Kumite 67 kg
2022	European Championships	Gaziantep, Turkey	1st	Team kumite
2023	European Championships	Guadalajara, Spain	1st	Kumite 67 kg
2023	European Championships	Guadalajara, Spain	2nd	Team kumite
2023	World Championships	Budapest, Hungary	1st	Kumite 67 kg
2023	World Championships	Budapest, Hungary	3rd	Team kumite
