= Karate at the 2022 Mediterranean Games – Men's 67 kg =

Men's kumite 67 kg at the 2022 Mediterranean Games
- Venue: Mohammed ben Ahmed CCO Hall 03 and 06
- Date: 26 June
- Competitors: 11 from 11 nations

Medalists
gold medal	Dionysios Xenos	Greece
silver medal	Luca Maresca	Italy
bronze medal	Ahmed Lotfy	Egypt
bronze medal	Marcos Tsangaras	Cyprus

The men's 67 kg competition in karate at the 2022 Mediterranean Games was held on 26 June at the Mohammed ben Ahmed CCO Hall 03 and 06 in Oran.

== Results ==
=== Bracket ===
Round of 16
Ahmed Lotfy (EGY)	3
Samy Ennkhaili (ESP)	0
Boran Berak (CRO)	5
Said Oubaya (MAR)	6
Stefan Joksić (SRB)	3
Fouad Benbara (ALG)	2

Quarterfinals
Ahmed Lotfy (EGY)	0
Dionysios Xenos (GRE)	2
Said Oubaya (MAR)	1
Burak Uygur (TUR)	0
Stefan Joksić (SRB)	1
Marcos Tsangaras (CYP)	8
Luca Maresca (ITA)	5
Younesse Salmi (FRA)	1

Semifinals
Dionysios Xenos (GRE)	2
Said Oubaya (MAR)	0
Marcos Tsangaras (CYP)	0
Luca Maresca (ITA)	4

Final
Dionysios Xenos (GRE)	3
Luca Maresca (ITA)	2

=== Repechage ===
Bronze medal
Ahmed Lotfy (EGY)	0
Said Oubaya (MAR)	0

Bronze medal
Younesse Salmi (FRA)	4
Marcos Tsangaras (CYP)	5
