= Karate at the 2026 Asian Games – Men's kumite 67 kg =

Men's kumite 67 kg at the 2026 Asian Games
- Venue: Toyohashi City General Gymnasium
- Date: 21 September 2026
- Competitors: 18 from 18 nations

Medalists
gold medal	Abdul Vakhkhob Rashidov	Uzbekistan
silver medal	Yugo Kozaki	Japan
bronze medal	Shih Cheng-chung	Chinese Taipei
bronze medal	Abdelrahman Al-Masatfa	Jordan

The men's kumite 67 kilograms competition at the 2026 Asian Games took place on 21 September 2026 at Toyohashi City General Gymnasium, Toyohashi. Uzbekistan's Abdul Vakhkhob Rashidov won the tournament after defeating Japan's Yugo Kozaki (7–5) in the final, winning Uzbekistan's first gold medal in the Games.

== Schedule ==
All times are Japan Standard Time (UTC+09:00)

Date	Time	Event
Monday, 21 September 2026	12:20	Round of 32
Monday, 21 September 2026	12:20	Round of 16
Monday, 21 September 2026	12:20	Quarterfinals
Monday, 21 September 2026	12:20	Semifinals
Monday, 21 September 2026	12:20	Repechage
Monday, 21 September 2026	12:20	Bronze medal bouts
Monday, 21 September 2026	17:15	Final

== Results ==
=== Main bracket ===
==== Final ====
Final
Yugo Kozaki (JPN)	5
Abdul Vakhkhob Rashidov (UZB)	7

==== Top half ====
Round of 32
Alisher Sultonov (TJK)	3
Shih Cheng-chung (TPE)	4

Round of 16
Shih Cheng-chung (TPE)	5
Mohammad Darwish (SYR)	1
Monirul Islam (BAN)	3
Yaman Al-Natsheh (QAT)	8
Mohammed Al-Assiri (KSA)	8
Sainbayaryn Davaajargal (MGL)	0
Yugo Kozaki (JPN)	3
Khuất Hải Nam (VIE)	2

Quarterfinals
Shih Cheng-chung (TPE)	6
Yaman Al-Natsheh (QAT)	5
Mohammed Al-Assiri (KSA)	0
Yugo Kozaki (JPN)	0

Semifinals
Shih Cheng-chung (TPE)	2
Yugo Kozaki (JPN)	5

==== Bottom half ====
Round of 32
Cheng Hui Pan (HKG)	2
Daýanç Keletliýew (TKM)	2

Round of 16
Cheng Hui Pan (HKG)	0
Abdul Vakhkhob Rashidov (UZB)	8
Mahmoud Daifallah (PLE)	0
Erlan Akylbek Uulu (KGZ)	0
Somphone Bounna (LAO)	1
Abdelrahman Al-Masatfa (JOR)	9
Olzhas Altynbek (KAZ)	3
Chrun Virakbouth (CAM)	2

Quarterfinals
Abdul Vakhkhob Rashidov (UZB)	5
Mahmoud Daifallah (PLE)	1
Abdelrahman Al-Masatfa (JOR)	8
Olzhas Altynbek (KAZ)	7

Semifinals
Abdul Vakhkhob Rashidov (UZB)	8
Abdelrahman Al-Masatfa (JOR)	0

=== Repechage ===
Repechage round 2
Khuất Hải Nam (VIE)	7
Mohammed Al-Assiri (KSA)	3
Cheng Hui Pan (HKG)	3
Mahmoud Daifallah (PLE)	5

Bronze medal bouts
Khuất Hải Nam (VIE)	3
Shih Cheng-chung (TPE)	9
Mahmoud Daifallah (PLE)	0
Abdelrahman Al-Masatfa (JOR)	4
