= Abdelrahman Al-Masatfa =

Jordanian karateka (born 1996)

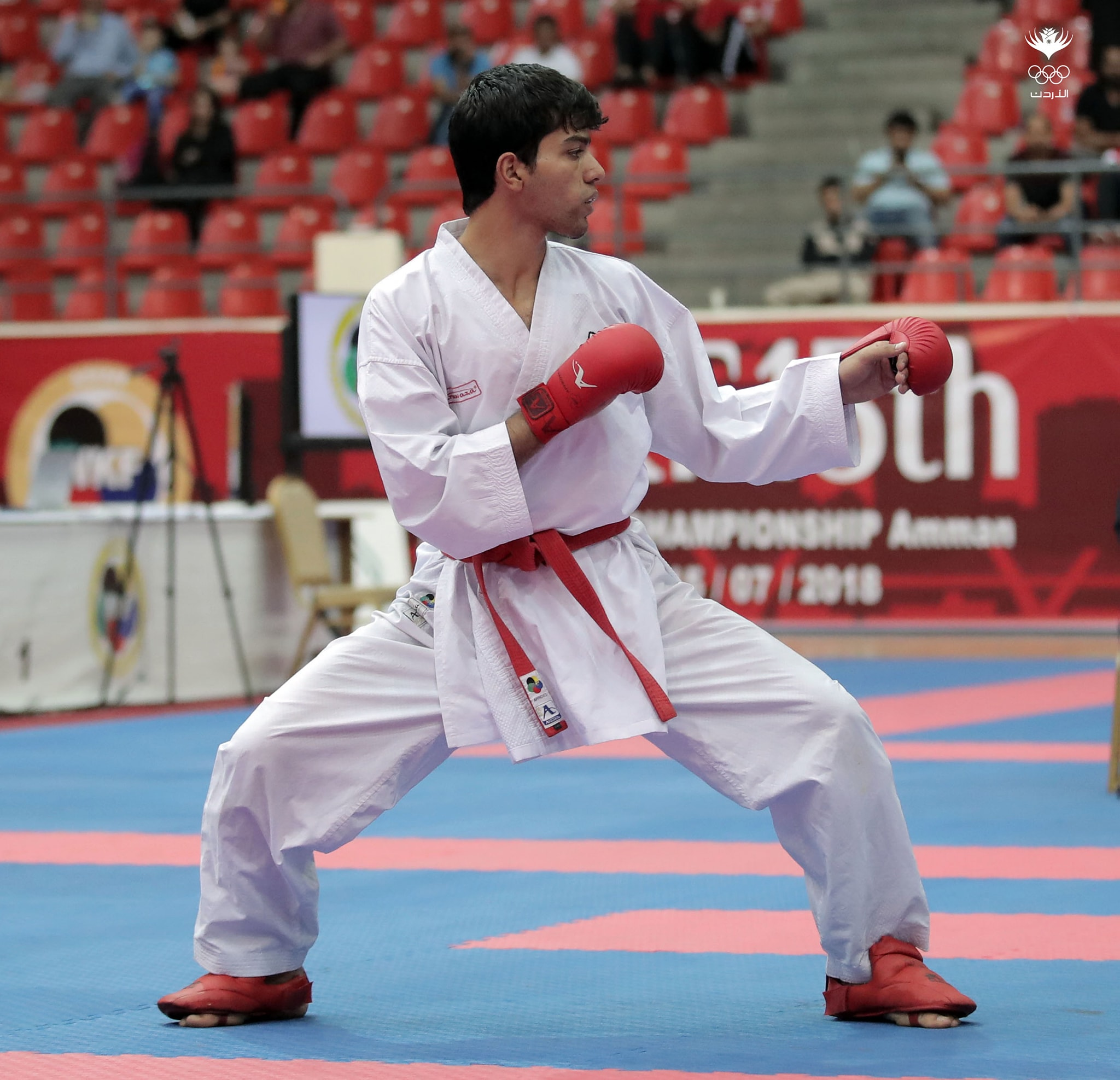
- Al-Masatfa in 2019

Personal information
- Born: 26 May 1996 (age 30)

Sport
- Country: Jordan
- Sport: Karate
- Weight class: 67 kg
- Events: Kumite; Team kumite
Medal record
Men's karate
Representing Jordan
Olympic Games
Bronze medal – third place	2020 Tokyo	Kumite 67 kg
World Games
Bronze medal – third place	2025 Chengdu	Kumite 67 kg
Asian Games
Silver medal – second place	2014 Incheon	Kumite 60 kg
Silver medal – second place	2022 Hangzhou	Kumite 67 kg
Bronze medal – third place	2018 Jakarta	Kumite 67 kg
Bronze medal – third place	2026 Aichi-Nagoya	Kumite 67 kg
Asian Karate Championships
Gold medal – first place	2018 Amman	Kumite 67 kg
Gold medal – first place	2022 Tashkent	Kumite 67 kg
Gold medal – first place	2023 Malacca	Kumite 67 kg
Gold medal – first place	2025 Tashkent	Team kumite
Gold medal – first place	2026 Bali	Team kumite
Silver medal – second place	2026 Bali	Kumite 67 kg
Bronze medal – third place	2019 Tashkent	Kumite 67 kg
Bronze medal – third place	2021 Almaty	Kumite 67 kg
Bronze medal – third place	2021 Almaty	Team kumite
Bronze medal – third place	2022 Tashkent	Team kumite
Bronze medal – third place	2023 Malacca	Team kumite
Islamic Solidarity Games
Silver medal – second place	2025 Riyadh	Kumite 67 kg
Bronze medal – third place	2021 Konya	Kumite 67 kg

Abdelrahman Al-Masatfa (Arabic: عبد الرحمن المصاطفة; born 26 May 1996) is a Jordanian karateka. He won one of the bronze medals in the men's 67 kg event at the 2020 Summer Olympics held in Tokyo, Japan. He is also a four-time medalist at the Asian Games and an eleven-time medalist, including five gold medals, at the Asian Karate Championships.

== Career ==
Al-Masatfa won the silver medal in the men's kumite 60 kg event at the 2014 Asian Games in Incheon, South Korea. He won one of the bronze medals in the men's kumite 67 kg at the 2018 Asian Games held in Jakarta, Indonesia.

Al-Masatfa won the gold medal in his event at the 2018 Asian Karate Championships held in Amman, Jordan. He defeated Fahad Al-Khathami of Saudi Arabia in his gold medal match. In 2019, he won one of the bronze medals in his event at the Asian Karate Championships held in Tashkent, Uzbekistan.

He qualified at the World Olympic Qualification Tournament in Paris, France to represent Jordan at the 2020 Summer Olympics in Tokyo, Japan. At the Olympics, Al-Masatfa won one of the bronze medals in the men's 67 kg event. He was also the flag bearer for Jordan during the closing ceremony.

In December 2021, Al-Masatfa won one of the bronze medals in his event at the Asian Karate Championships held in Almaty, Kazakhstan. He also won one of the bronze medals in the men's team kumite event.

Al-Masatfa won one of the bronze medals in the men's 67 kg event at the 2021 Islamic Solidarity Games held in Konya, Turkey.

In 2023, Al-Masatfa won the gold medal in his event at the Asian Karate Championships held in Malacca, Malaysia. He defeated Didar Amirali of Kazakhstan in his gold medal match. He also won one of the bronze medals in the men's team kumite event. In the same year, Al-Masatfa won the silver medal in the men's kumite 67 kg event at the 2022 Asian Games held in Hangzhou, China.

Al-Masatfa won the bronze medal in the men's kumite 67 kg event at the 2025 World Games held in Chengdu, China. He defeated Fahad Al-Khathami of Saudi Arabia in the bronze medal match.

In the 2026, he won another bronze medal in the men's kumite 67 kg event at the 2026 Asian Games held in Aichi Prefecture in Japan, winning Jordan's first medal in the tournament. He defeated Mahmoud Deifallah of Palestine (4–0) in the third place match.

== Achievements ==
Year	Competition	Venue	Rank	Event
2014	Asian Games	Incheon, South Korea	2nd	Kumite 60 kg
2018	Asian Championships	Amman, Jordan	1st	Kumite 67 kg
2018	Asian Games	Jakarta, Indonesia	3rd	Kumite 67 kg
2019	Asian Championships	Tashkent, Uzbekistan	3rd	Kumite 67 kg
2021	Summer Olympics	Tokyo, Japan	3rd	Kumite 67 kg
2021	Asian Championships	Almaty, Kazakhstan	3rd	Kumite 67 kg
2021	Asian Championships	Almaty, Kazakhstan	3rd	Team kumite
2022	Islamic Solidarity Games	Konya, Turkey	3rd	Kumite 67 kg
2022	Asian Championships	Tashkent, Uzbekistan	1st	Kumite 67 kg
2022	Asian Championships	Tashkent, Uzbekistan	3rd	Team kumite
2023	Asian Championships	Malacca, Malaysia	1st	Kumite 67 kg
2023	Asian Championships	Malacca, Malaysia	3rd	Team kumite
2023	Asian Games	Hangzhou, China	2nd	Kumite 67 kg
2025	Asian Championships	Tashkent, Uzbekistan	1st	Team kumite
2025	World Games	Chengdu, China	3rd	Kumite 67 kg
2026	Asian Championships	Bali, Indonesia	2nd	Kumite 67 kg
2026	Asian Championships	Bali, Indonesia	1st	Team kumite
2026	Asian Games	Aichi and Nagoya, Japan	3rd	Kumite 67 kg
