= Karate at the 2023 European Games – Men's kumite 67 kg =

Men's kumite 67 kg at the 2023 European Games
- Venue: Bielsko-Biała Arena
- Date: 22 June
- Competitors: 8 from 8 nations

Medalists
gold medal	Tural Aghalarzade	Azerbaijan
silver medal	Dionysios Xenos	Greece
bronze medal	Ştefan Comănescu	Romania
bronze medal	Miłosz Sabiecki	Poland

The men's kumite 67 kg competition at the 2023 European Games was held on 22 June 2023 at the Bielsko-Biała Arena.

== Results ==
=== Elimination round ===
Pool A

Pos	Athlete	B	W	D	D^{0}	L	Pts	Score	(Romania)	(Poland)	(North Macedonia)	(Turkey)
1	Ştefan Comănescu (ROU)	3	3	0	0	0	9	14–7	—	6–2	6–4	2–1
2	Miłosz Sabiecki (POL)	3	2	0	0	1	6	13–12	2–6	—	8–4	3–2
3	Emil Pavlov (MKD)	3	1	0	0	2	3	14–14	4–6	4–8	—	6–0
4	Burak Uygur (TUR)	3	0	0	0	3	0	3–11	1–2	2–3	0–6	—

Source: EG2023

Pool B

Pos	Athlete	B	W	D	D^{0}	L	Pts	Score	(Azerbaijan)	(Greece)	(Hungary)	(Switzerland)
1	Tural Aghalarzade (AZE)	3	3	0	0	0	9	11–3	—	2–0	4–0	5–3
2	Dionysios Xenos (GRE)	3	2	0	0	1	6	10–6	0–2	—	5–3	5–1
3	Yves Martial Tadissi (HUN)	3	1	0	0	2	3	11–9	0–4	3–5	—	8–0
4	Noah Pisino (SUI)	3	0	0	0	3	0	4–18	3–5	1–5	0–8	—

Source: EG2023

=== Finals ===
Semifinals
Dionysios Xenos (GRE)	6
Ştefan Comănescu (ROU)	1
Miłosz Sabiecki (POL)	3
Tural Aghalarzade (AZE)	4

Gold medal bout
Dionysios Xenos (GRE)	0
Tural Aghalarzade (AZE)	0
