= Soichiro Nakano =

Japanese karateka (born 1998)

Personal information
- Born: 2 March 1998 (age 28)

Sport
- Country: (Japan) Suita， Osaka
- Sport: Karate
- Weight class: 67 kg
- Event: Kumite
Medal record
Men's karate
Representing Japan
World Championships
Bronze medal – third place	2021 Dubai	Kumite 67 kg
Asian Karate Championships
Gold medal – first place	2021 Almaty	Kumite 67 kg

Soichiro Nakano (born 2 March 1998) is a Japanese karateka. He won one of the bronze medals in the men's 67 kg event at the 2021 World Karate Championships held in Dubai, United Arab Emirates.

Nakano won the silver medal in the men's 67 kg event at the 2018 World University Karate Championships held in Kobe, Japan. He also won the gold medal in the men's team kumite event. In December 2021, he won the gold medal in his event at the Asian Karate Championships held in Almaty, Kazakhstan.

Nakano competed in the men's kumite 67 kg event at the 2022 World Games held in Birmingham, United States. In 2023, he competed in the men's kumite 67 kg event at the 2022 Asian Games held in Hangzhou, China. He also competed in the men's kumite 67 kg event at the 2023 World Karate Championships held in Budapest, Hungary where he was eliminated in his second match.

== Achievements ==
Year	Competition	Venue	Rank	Event
2021	World Championships	Dubai, United Arab Emirates	3rd	Kumite 67 kg
2021	Asian Championships	Almaty, Kazakhstan	1st	Kumite 67 kg
