= Karate at the 2022 Asian Games – Men's kumite 67 kg =

Men's kumite 67 kg at the 2022 Asian Games
- Venue: Linping Sports Centre Gymnasium
- Date: 7 October 2023
- Competitors: 22 from 22 nations

Medalists
gold medal	Fahed Al-Ajmi	Kuwait
silver medal	Abdelrahman Al-Masatfa	Jordan
bronze medal	Baýry Baýryýew	Turkmenistan
bronze medal	Didar Amirali	Kazakhstan

The men's kumite 67 kg competition at the 2022 Asian Games took place on 7 October 2023 at Linping Sports Centre Gymnasium, Hangzhou.

== Schedule ==
All times are China Standard Time (UTC+08:00)

Date	Time	Event
Saturday, 7 October 2023	14:00	Round of 32
Saturday, 7 October 2023	14:00	Round of 16
Saturday, 7 October 2023	14:00	Quarterfinals
Saturday, 7 October 2023	14:00	Semifinals
Saturday, 7 October 2023	14:00	Repechages
Saturday, 7 October 2023	14:00	Finals

== Results ==
Legend

- H — Won by hansoku (8–0)

=== Main bracket ===
==== Final ====
Gold medal contest
Fahed Al-Ajmi (KUW)	9
Abdelrahman Al-Masatfa (JOR)	6

==== Top half ====
Round of 32
Dionísio Fernandes (TLS)	1
Shih Cheng-chung (TPE)	10
Fahed Al-Ajmi (KUW)	8
Rinchen Jamtsho (BHU)	0
Sadriddin Saymatov (UZB)	4
Kalys Nurlanbek Uulu (KGZ)	5

Round of 16
Matthew Manantan (PHI)	2
Shih Cheng-chung (TPE)	4
Soichiro Nakano (JPN)	4
Yaman Al-Natsheh (QAT)	1
Baýry Baýryýew (TKM)	1
Fahed Al-Ajmi (KUW)	4
Kalys Nurlanbek Uulu (KGZ)	11
Vong Man Tek (MAC)	5

Quarterfinals
Shih Cheng-chung (TPE)	6
Soichiro Nakano (JPN)	0
Fahed Al-Ajmi (KUW)	11
Kalys Nurlanbek Uulu (KGZ)	3

Semifinals
Shih Cheng-chung (TPE)	4
Fahed Al-Ajmi (KUW)	7^{H}

==== Bottom half ====
Round of 32
Abdelrahman Al-Masatfa (JOR)	7
Amir Mehdizadeh (IRI)	0
Didar Amirali (KAZ)	8
Chrun Virakbouth (CAM)	0
Song Yun-hak (PRK)	2
Prem Kumar Selvam (MAS)	6

Round of 16
Abduvahob Sharapov (TJK)	1
Abdelrahman Al-Masatfa (JOR)	9
Chaiwat Phiandee (THA)	3
Santosh Shrestha (NEP)	2
Cheng Hui Pan (HKG)	3
Didar Amirali (KAZ)	10
Prem Kumar Selvam (MAS)	2
Denetha Avihinsa Fernando (SRI)	0

Quarterfinals
Abdelrahman Al-Masatfa (JOR)	8
Chaiwat Phiandee (THA)	0
Didar Amirali (KAZ)	8
Prem Kumar Selvam (MAS)	0

Semifinals
Abdelrahman Al-Masatfa (JOR)	10
Didar Amirali (KAZ)	2

=== Repechage ===
Repechage round 1
Rinchen Jamtsho (BHU)	0
Baýry Baýryýew (TKM)	8
Amir Mehdizadeh (IRI)	1
Abduvahob Sharapov (TJK)	0

Repechage round 2
Baýry Baýryýew (TKM)	8
Kalys Nurlanbek Uulu (KGZ)	4
Amir Mehdizadeh (IRI)	6
Chaiwat Phiandee (THA)	5

Bronze medal bouts
Baýry Baýryýew (TKM)	9
Shih Cheng-chung (TPE)	1
Amir Mehdizadeh (IRI)	2
Didar Amirali (KAZ)	7
