= Water skiing at the 2017 World Games – Men's slalom =

2017 men's slalom competition

Water skiing - Men's Slalom at the 2017 World Games
- Venue: Old Odra River, Wrocław, Poland
- Dates: 25–26 July 2017
- Competitors: 11 from 11 nations

Medalists
gold medal	(Czech Republic) Adam Sedlmajer
silver medal	(Canada) Steve Neveu
bronze medal	(Italy) Thomas Degasperi

The men's slalom competition in water skiing at the 2017 World Games took place from 25 to 26 July 2017 at the Old Odra River in Wrocław, Poland.

== Competition format ==
A total of 11 athletes entered the competition. From qualifications the best 9 skiers qualify to final. Skiers have to pass 6 buoys. Every time length of the rope is shorter, respectively: 18.25m, 13.00m, 12.00m, 11.25m, 10.75m and 10.25m. The score include number of good passes of buoys, speed (58 km/h for every athlete) and length of the rope.

== Results ==
=== Qualifications ===
Rank	Athlete	Nation	Result	Note
1	Steve Neveu	Canada	2.0b/12.00m	Q
2	Adam Sedlmajer	Czech Republic	1.0b/12.00m	Q
3	Nick Adams	Australia	3.5b/13.00m	Q
4	Santiago Correa	Colombia	3.0b/13.00m	Q
5	Sandro Ambrosi	Mexico	5.0b/18.25m	Q
6	Thomas Degasperi	Italy	3.0b/18.25m	Q
6	Benjamin Stadlbaur	Switzerland	3.0b/18.25m	Q
8	Martin Bartalsky	Slovakia	2.5b/18.25m	Q
9	Robert Pigozzi	Dominican Republic	1.0b/18.25m	Q
	Bojan Schipner	Germany	DNS	
	Jack Critchley	(United Kingdom) Great Britain	DNS	

=== Final ===
Rank	Athlete	Nation	Result
1st place, gold medalist(s)	Adam Sedlmajer	Czech Republic	3.0b/10.75m
2nd place, silver medalist(s)	Steve Neveu	Canada	3.0b/10.75m
3rd place, bronze medalist(s)	Thomas Degasperi	Italy	1.0b/10.75m
4	Sandro Ambrosi	Mexico	5.5b/11.25m
5	Martin Bartalsky	Slovakia	4.5b/11.25m
6	Benjamin Stadlbaur	Switzerland	4.0b/11.25m
7	Robert Pigozzi	Dominican Republic	4.0b/11.25m
8	Nick Adams	Australia	3.0b/11.25m
9	Santiago Correa	Colombia	0.5b/11.25m
