= Dionysios Xenos =

Greek karateka (born 1995)

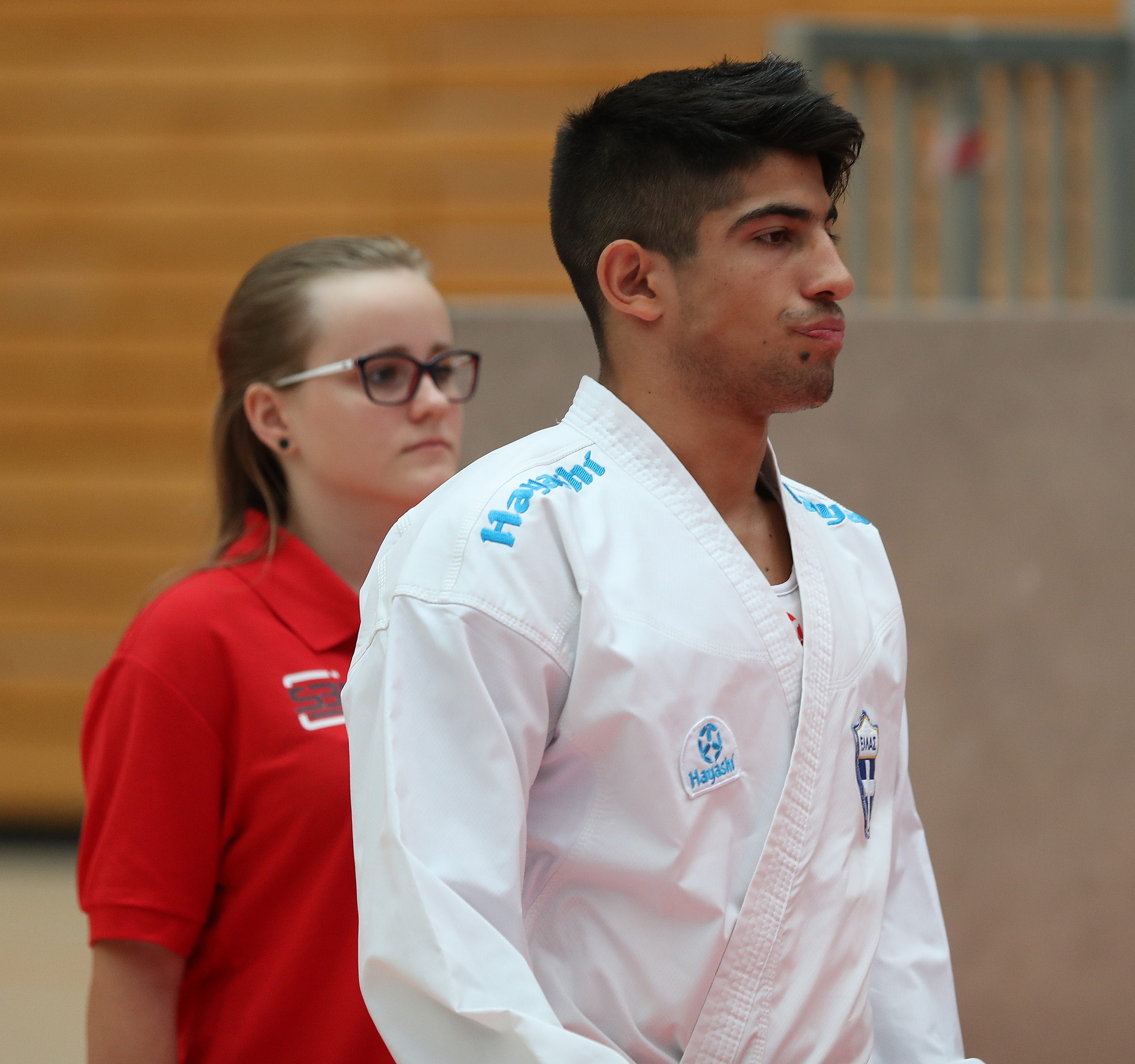
- Xenos in 2018

Personal information
- Born: 5 July 1995 (age 30)

Sport
- Country: Greece
- Sport: Karate
- Position: Coach
- Weight class: 67 kg
- Events: Kumite; Team kumite
- Retired: since 2024
- Now coaching: since 2024
Medal record
Men's karate
Representing Greece
World Games
Bronze medal – third place	2022 Birmingham	Kumite 67 kg
European Games
Silver medal – second place	2023 Kraków-Małopolska	Kumite 67 kg
European Championships
Gold medal – first place	2021 Poreč	Kumite 67 kg
Silver medal – second place	2022 Gaziantep	Kumite 67 kg
Silver medal – second place	2023 Guadalajara	Kumite 67 kg
Bronze medal – third place	2022 Gaziantep	Team kumite
Mediterranean Games
Gold medal – first place	2022 Oran	Kumite 67 kg

Dionysios Xenos (born 5 July 1995) is a Greek karateka. He won the gold medal in the men's 67 kg event at the 2021 European Karate Championships held in Poreč, Croatia. He also won the gold medal in his event at the 2022 Mediterranean Games held in Oran, Algeria.

== Career ==
Xenos won one of the bronze medals in the under-21 men's 67 kg event at the 2016 EKF Cadet, Junior and under-21 Championships held in Limassol, Cyprus.

In June 2021, Xenos competed at the World Olympic Qualification Tournament held in Paris, France hoping to qualify for the 2020 Summer Olympics in Tokyo, Japan. In October 2021, he won the gold medal in his event at the 2021 Mediterranean Karate Championships held in Limassol, Cyprus. A month later, Xenos lost his bronze medal match in the men's 67 kg event at the World Karate Championships held in Dubai, United Arab Emirates.

Xenos won the gold medal in the men's 67 kg event at the 2022 Mediterranean Games held in Oran, Algeria. In the final, he defeated Luca Maresca of Italy. He won the bronze medal in the men's kumite 67 kg event at the 2022 World Games held in Birmingham, United States.

Xenos won the silver medal in the men's 67 kg event at the 2023 European Karate Championships held in Guadalajara, Spain. He also won the silver medal in the men's 67 kg event at the 2023 European Games held in Poland. Xenos competed in the men's 67 kg event at the 2023 World Karate Championships held in Budapest, Hungary.

== Personal life ==
His brother Christos-Stefanos Xenos also competes in karate.

== Achievements ==
Year	Competition	Venue	Rank	Event
2021	European Championships	Poreč, Croatia	1st	Kumite 67 kg
2022	European Championships	Gaziantep, Turkey	2nd	Kumite 67 kg
2022	European Championships	Gaziantep, Turkey	3rd	Team kumite
2022	Mediterranean Games	Oran, Algeria	1st	Kumite 67 kg
2022	World Games	Birmingham, United States	3rd	Kumite 67 kg
2023	European Championships	Guadalajara, Spain	2nd	Kumite 67 kg
2023	European Games	Kraków and Małopolska, Poland	2nd	Kumite 67 kg
