= Karate at the 2014 Asian Games – Men's kumite 60 kg =

Karate competition

Men's kumite 60 kg at the 2014 Asian Games
- Venue: Gyeyang Gymnasium
- Date: 3 October 2014
- Competitors: 19 from 19 nations

Medalists
gold medal	Amir Mehdizadeh	Iran
silver medal	Abdelrahman Al-Masatfa	Jordan
bronze medal	Nguyễn Thanh Duy	Vietnam
bronze medal	Lee Ji-hwan	South Korea

The men's kumite 60 kilograms competition at the 2014 Asian Games in Incheon, South Korea was held on 2 October 2014 at the Gyeyang Gymnasium.

== Schedule ==
All times are Korea Standard Time (UTC+09:00)

Date	Time	Event
Friday, 3 October 2014	13:30	1/16 finals
Friday, 3 October 2014	13:30	1/8 finals
Friday, 3 October 2014	13:30	Quarterfinals
Friday, 3 October 2014	13:30	Semifinals
Friday, 3 October 2014	13:30	Final of repechage
Friday, 3 October 2014	13:30	Finals

== Results ==
Legend

- H — Won by hansoku (8–0)
- K — Won by kiken (8–0)

=== Main bracket ===
==== Final ====
Final
Abdelrahman Al-Masatfa (JOR)	3
Amir Mehdizadeh (IRI)	6

==== Top half ====
1/16 finals
Imad Al-Malki (KSA)	0
Darkhan Assadilov (KAZ)	3
Parnuchit Jankaew (THA)	4
Nguyễn Thanh Duy (VIE)	6

1/8 finals
Darkhan Assadilov (KAZ)	H
Ryang Ki-chol (PRK)
Chong Wai Lon (MAC)	K
Jaime Godinho Soares (TLS)
Nguyễn Thanh Duy (VIE)	5
Mairul Mohammad (BRU)	2
Abdelrahman Al-Masatfa (JOR)	11
Lee Chun Ho (HKG)	3

Quarterfinals
Darkhan Assadilov (KAZ)	8
Chong Wai Lon (MAC)	0
Nguyễn Thanh Duy (VIE)	2
Abdelrahman Al-Masatfa (JOR)	6

Semifinals
Darkhan Assadilov (KAZ)	6
Abdelrahman Al-Masatfa (JOR)	7

==== Bottom half ====
1/16 finals
Urmatbek Abdilaev (KGZ)	1
Sardor Fayzullaev (UZB)	4

1/8 finals
Sardor Fayzullaev (UZB)	7
Lee Ji-hwan (KOR)	8
Liu Chung-chiang (TPE)	8
Amangeldi Bäşimow (TKM)	0
Md Samim Osman (BAN)
Wang Zhiwei (CHN)	K
Amir Mehdizadeh (IRI)	8
Safarali Davlatov (TJK)	0

Quarterfinals
Lee Ji-hwan (KOR)	6
Liu Chung-chiang (TPE)	0
Wang Zhiwei (CHN)	4
Amir Mehdizadeh (IRI)	11

Semifinals
Lee Ji-hwan (KOR)	2
Amir Mehdizadeh (IRI)	3

=== Repechage ===
Final of repechage
Lee Chun Ho (HKG)	2
Nguyễn Thanh Duy (VIE)	2
Safarali Davlatov (TJK)	2
Wang Zhiwei (CHN)	7

Bronze medal contest
Nguyễn Thanh Duy (VIE)	7
Darkhan Assadilov (KAZ)	1
Wang Zhiwei (CHN)	3
Lee Ji-hwan (KOR)	11
