= Dominican Republic at the 2017 World Games =

- IOC code: DOM

in Wrocław, Poland 20 July 2017 – 30 July 2017
- Medals Ranked 57th: Gold 0 Silver 0 Bronze 1 Total 1

World Games appearances
- 1981; 1985; 1989; 1993; 1997; 2001; 2005; 2009; 2013; 2017; 2022; 2025

Dominican Republic competed at the 2017 World Games held in Wrocław, Poland.

== Medalists ==
| Medal | Name | Sport | Event |
|---|---|---|---|
| Bronze | Deivis Ferreras | Karate | Men's kumite 67 kg |

== Karate ==
Deivis Ferreras won the bronze medal in the men's kumite 67 kg event.

== Water skiing ==
Robert Pigozzi competed in the men's slalom event.
