= Boules sports at the 2017 World Games – Women's lyonnaise precision =

Boules sports - Women's Lyonnaise Precision at the 2017 World Games
- Venue: Centennial Hall, Wrocław, Poland
- Date: 24 July 2017
- Competitors: 8 from 8 nations

Medalists
gold medal	(China) Guo Xiaomin
silver medal	(France) Suzy Marie
bronze medal	(Slovenia) Laura Skoberne

The women's lyonnaise precision competition in boules sports at the 2017 World Games took place on 24 July 2017 at the Centennial Hall in Wrocław, Poland.

== Competition format ==
A total of 8 athletes entered the competition. Top 4 athletes from qualification advances to the final.

== Results ==
=== Qualification ===
Rank	Athlete	Nation	Round 1	Round 2	Result	Note
1	Guo Xiaomin	China	22	34	56	Q
2	Sabrina Polito Molina	Chile	17	16	33	Q
3	Suzy Marie	France	17	14	31	Q
4	Laura Skoberne	Slovenia	10	7	17	Q
5	Samia Touloum	Algeria	7	9	16	
6	Fatiha Targahoui	Morocco	8	7	15	
7	Melike Boz	Turkey	9	4	13	
8	Caterina Venturini	Italy	8	3	11	

=== Final ===
Rank	Athlete	Nation	Result
1st place, gold medalist(s)	Guo Xiaomin	China	16
2nd place, silver medalist(s)	Suzy Marie	France	15
3rd place, bronze medalist(s)	Laura Skoberne	Slovenia	10
4	Sabrina Polito Molina	Chile	7
