= Said Oubaya =

Moroccan karateka (born 2003)

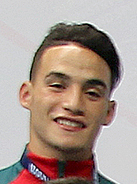
- Oubaya in 2021

Personal information
- Born: 28 May 2003 (age 23)

Sport
- Country: Morocco
- Sport: Karate
- Event: Kumite
Medal record
Men's karate
Representing Morocco
World Games
Gold medal – first place	2025 Chengdu	Kumite 67 kg
World Championships
Silver medal – second place	2025 Cairo	Kumite 67 kg
African Games
Silver medal – second place	2023 Accra	Kumite 67 kg
Mediterranean Games
Bronze medal – third place	2026 Taranto	Kumite 67 kg
Islamic Solidarity Games
Silver medal – second place	2021 Konya	Kumite 67 kg

Said Oubaya (Arabic: سعيد أبايا; born 28 May 2003) is a Moroccan karateka. He won the gold medal in the men's kumite 67 kg event at the 2025 World Games held in Chengdu, China.

He lost his bronze medal match in the men's 67 kg event at the 2022 Mediterranean Games held in Oran, Algeria. He won the gold medal in the men's 67 kg event at the 2023 African Karate Championships held in Casablanca, Morocco.

== Achievements ==
Year	Competition	Venue	Rank	Event
2022	Islamic Solidarity Games	Konya, Turkey	2nd	Kumite 67 kg
2024	African Games	Accra, Ghana	2nd	Kumite 67 kg
2025	World Games	Chengdu, China	1st	Kumite 67 kg
