= Tsuneari Yahiro =

Australian karateka (born 1987)

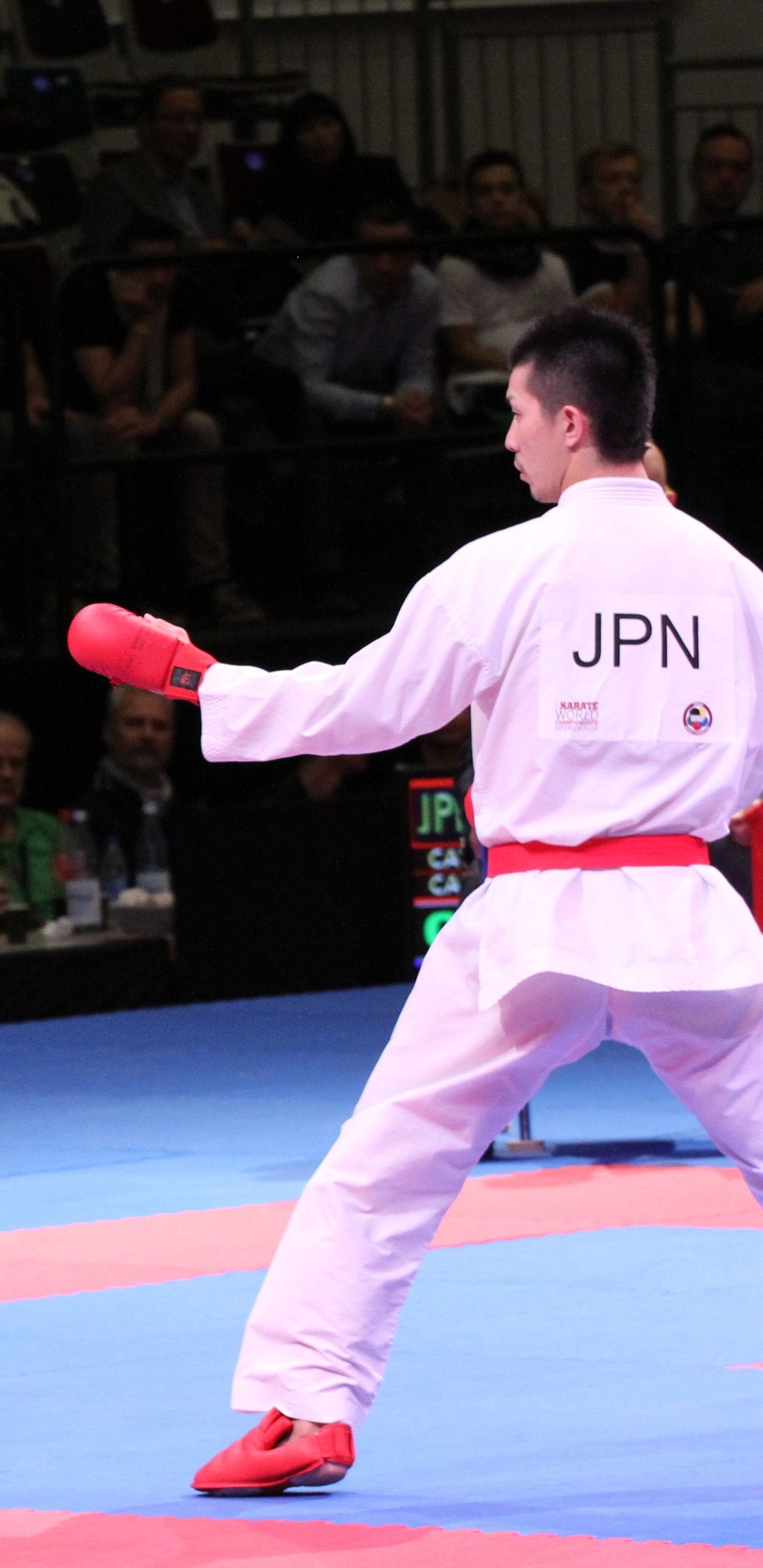
- World championship 2014

Personal information
- Born: 12 September 1987 (age 38)

Sport
- Country: Australia
- Sport: Karate
- Event: Kumite
Medal record
Men's karate
Representing Australia
World Games
Bronze medal – third place	2013 Cali	Kumite 67 kg

Tsuneari Yahiro (born 12 September 1987) is an Australian karateka. He was Australia's first Karate Olympian, competing in the 2020 Summer Olympics in Tokyo, Japan.

== Career ==
He is a four time Oceania karate champion, winning over 3 categories of 60 kg, 67 kg and 75 kg.

At the 2010 World combat games held in Beijing, China, he won the bronze medal in the men’s kumite 60 kg event.

At the 2013 World Games held in Cali, Colombia, he won the bronze medal in the men's kumite 67 kg event. In 2017, he competed in the men's 67 kg event at the 2017 World Games held in Wrocław, Poland. He drew one match and lost two matches in the elimination round and he did not advance to compete in the semi-finals.

He represented Australia at the 2020 Summer Olympics in Tokyo, Japan. He competed in the men's 75 kg event. He was beaten by all four of his opponents in the group stage and therefore did not compete for a medal.

In 2021, he competed at the World Olympic Qualification Tournament held in Paris, France hoping to qualify for the 2020 Summer Olympics in Tokyo, Japan. He did not qualify at this tournament due to dislocating his shoulder but he was able to qualify via continental representation soon after. He competed in the men's 75 kg event where he did not advance to compete in the semifinals.

== Achievements ==
Year	Competition	Venue	Rank	Event
2013	World Games	Cali, Colombia	3rd	Kumite 67 kg
