= Ali El-Sawy =

Egyptian karateka (born 1995)

Personal information
- Full name: Ali Mohamed Mohamed El-Sawy
- Born: February 16, 1995 (age 31) Cairo, Egypt

Sport
- Country: Egypt
- Sport: Karate
- Events: Kumite; Team kumite
Medal record
Men's karate
Representing Egypt
World Championships
Silver medal – second place	2023 Budapest	Team kumite
Bronze medal – third place	2021 Dubai	Kumite 67 kg
African Games
Gold medal – first place	2015 Brazzaville	Team kumite
Bronze medal – third place	2015 Brazzaville	Kumite 67 kg
Bronze medal – third place	2019 Rabat	Team kumite

Ali Mohamed Mohamed El-Sawy (born February 16, 1995) is an Egyptian karateka. He is the current World Number 1 Rank in the Men's Individual -67 kg Kumite and he won a bronze medal in Karate at the 2017 Islamic Solidarity Games, The 4th Islamic Solidarity Games held at Baku Sports Hall, Baku, Azerbaijan from 13 to 14 May 2017. he got bronze medal at world championship Dubai 2021

== Career ==
He won the gold medal in Male Kumite -67 kg, his first title of Karate's most important competition in nearly two years in WKF Karate 1 Premier League 2020-=2021 and previously he won medals in the World Karate Championships.

He also won several medals, including gold, silver and bronze medals in the African & Mediterranean Championships as well as the World Karate Federation Karate 1 Premier League and Series A Championships.

== Achievements ==
He qualified for the 2020 Summer Olympics in Tokyo, Japan as WKF Olympic Standings Ranking qualifying spots, where karate will be featured for the first time and now he will represent Egyptian Team at the 2020 Summer Olympics at the Karate competition of the 2020 Summer Olympics in Tokyo, Japan.

Competition Results
YEAR	COMPETITION	VENUE	RANK/POSITION	EVENT
2021	Karate 1 Premier League	Lisbon Portugal	Bronze	Individual -67 kg Kumite
2021	Karate 1 Premier League	Istanbul Turkey	Gold	Individual -67 kg Kumite
2020	Karate 1 Premier League	Salzburg Austria	Bronze	Individual -67 kg Kumite
2020	UFAK JUNIOR & SENIOR CHAMPIONSHIPS	Tangier Morocco	Silver	Individual -67 kg Kumite
2020	2020 KARATE1 SERIES A	Santiago Chile	Silver	Individual -67 kg Kumite
2019	Karate 1 Premier League	Madrid Spain	5th	Individual -67 kg Kumite
2019	Karate 1 Premier League	Moscow ROC	Silver	Individual -67 kg Kumite
2019	UFAK JUNIOR & SENIOR CHAMPIONSHIPS	Gaborone Botswana	Gold	Individual -67 kg Kumite
2019	2019 KARATE1 SERIES A	Montreal Canada	7th	Individual -67 kg Kumite
2019	Karate 1 Premier League	Shanghai China	Bronze	Individual -67 kg Kumite
2019	2019 KARATE1 SERIES A	Istanbul Turkey	5th	Individual -67 kg Kumite
2019	Karate 1 Premier League	Rabat Morocco	Gold	Individual -67 kg Kumite
2019	2019 KARATE1 SERIES A	Salzburg Austria	Silver	Individual -67 kg Kumite
2018	Senior World Karate Championship	Madrid Spain	7th	Individual -67 kg Kumite
2018	UFAK JUNIOR & SENIOR CHAMPIONSHIPS	RWA Rwanda	Gold	Individual -67 kg Kumite
2018	Karate 1 Premier League	Rabat Morocco	Gold	Individual -67 kg Kumite
2018	Karate 1 Premier League	Dubai United Arab Emirates	5th	Individual -67 kg Kumite
2017	Karate 1 Premier League	Rabat Morocco	Gold	Individual -67 kg Kumite
2016	Karate 1 Premier League	Dubai United Arab Emirates	Gold	Individual -67 kg Kumite
2016	Karate 1 Premier League - Sharm El Sheikh	Egy Egypt	5th	Individual -67 kg Kumite
2015	Junior, Cadet and U21 World Karate Championship	Jakarta Indonesia	Bronze	U21 Individual -67 kg Kumite
2014	MediterraneanSenior Championships	MNE Montenegro	Silver	U21 Individual -67 kg Kumite
2014	Karate 1 Premier League	Paris France	Bronze	Individual -67 kg Kumite
2012	Karate 1 Youth Cup	Corfu Greece	Gold	Junior Individual -68 kg Kumite
