= Didar Amirali =

Kazakhstani karateka (born 1996)

Personal information
- Born: 22 February 1996 (age 30)

Sport
- Country: Kazakhstan
- Sport: Karate
- Weight class: 67 kg
- Events: Kumite; Team kumite
Medal record
Men's karate
Representing Kazakhstan
World Championships
Bronze medal – third place	2023 Budapest	Kumite 67 kg
Bronze medal – third place	2025 Cairo	Kumite 67 kg
Asian Games
Silver medal – second place	2018 Jakarta	Kumite 67 kg
Bronze medal – third place	2022 Hangzhou	Kumite 67 kg
Asian Championships
Silver medal – second place	2019 Tashkent	Kumite 67 kg
Silver medal – second place	2023 Malacca	Kumite 67 kg
Bronze medal – third place	2017 Astana	Team kumite
Bronze medal – third place	2021 Almaty	Kumite 67 kg
Bronze medal – third place	2022 Tashkent	Kumite 67 kg
Bronze medal – third place	2025 Tashkent	Team kumite

Didar Amirali (Дидар Маратұлы Амирали, born 22 February 1996) is a Kazakhstani karateka. He won the silver medal in the men's kumite 67 kg event at the 2018 Asian Games held in Jakarta, Indonesia. He also won one of the bronze medals in his event at the 2022 Asian Games in Hangzhou, China.

== Career ==
At the 2017 Asian Karate Championships held in Astana, Kazakhstan, Amirali won one of the bronze medals in the men's team kumite event. He won the silver medal in the men's kumite 67 kg event at the 2018 Asian Games held in Jakarta, Indonesia. In 2019, he won the silver medal in the men's kumite 67 kg event.

Amirali won one of the bronze medals in his event at the 2021 Asian Karate Championships held in Almaty, Kazakhstan.

In 2022, Amirali competed at the 2021 Islamic Solidarity Games held in Konya, Turkey. He won one of the bronze medals in the men's kumite 67 kg event at the 2022 Asian Karate Championships held in Tashkent, Uzbekistan.

In July 2023, Amirali won the silver medal in his event at the Asian Karate Championships held in Malacca, Malaysia. A few months later, in October 2023, he won one of the bronze medals in his event at the 2022 Asian Games in Hangzhou, China. In the same month, Amirali also won one of the bronze medals in the men's 67 kg event at the 2023 World Karate Championships held in Budapest, Hungary.

== Achievements ==
Year	Competition	Venue	Rank	Event
2017	Asian Championships	Astana, Kazakhstan	3rd	Team kumite
2018	Asian Games	Jakarta, Indonesia	2nd	Kumite 67 kg
2019	Asian Championships	Tashkent, Uzbekistan	2nd	Kumite 67 kg
2021	Asian Championships	Almaty, Kazakhstan	3rd	Kumite 67 kg
2022	Asian Championships	Tashkent, Uzbekistan	3rd	Kumite 67 kg
2023	Asian Championships	Malacca, Malaysia	2nd	Kumite 67 kg
2023	Asian Games	Hangzhou, China	3rd	Kumite 67 kg
2023	World Championships	Budapest, Hungary	3rd	Kumite 67 kg
2025	Asian Championships	Tashkent, Uzbekistan	3rd	Team kumite
