= Emil Pavlov =

Macedonian karateka (born 1992)

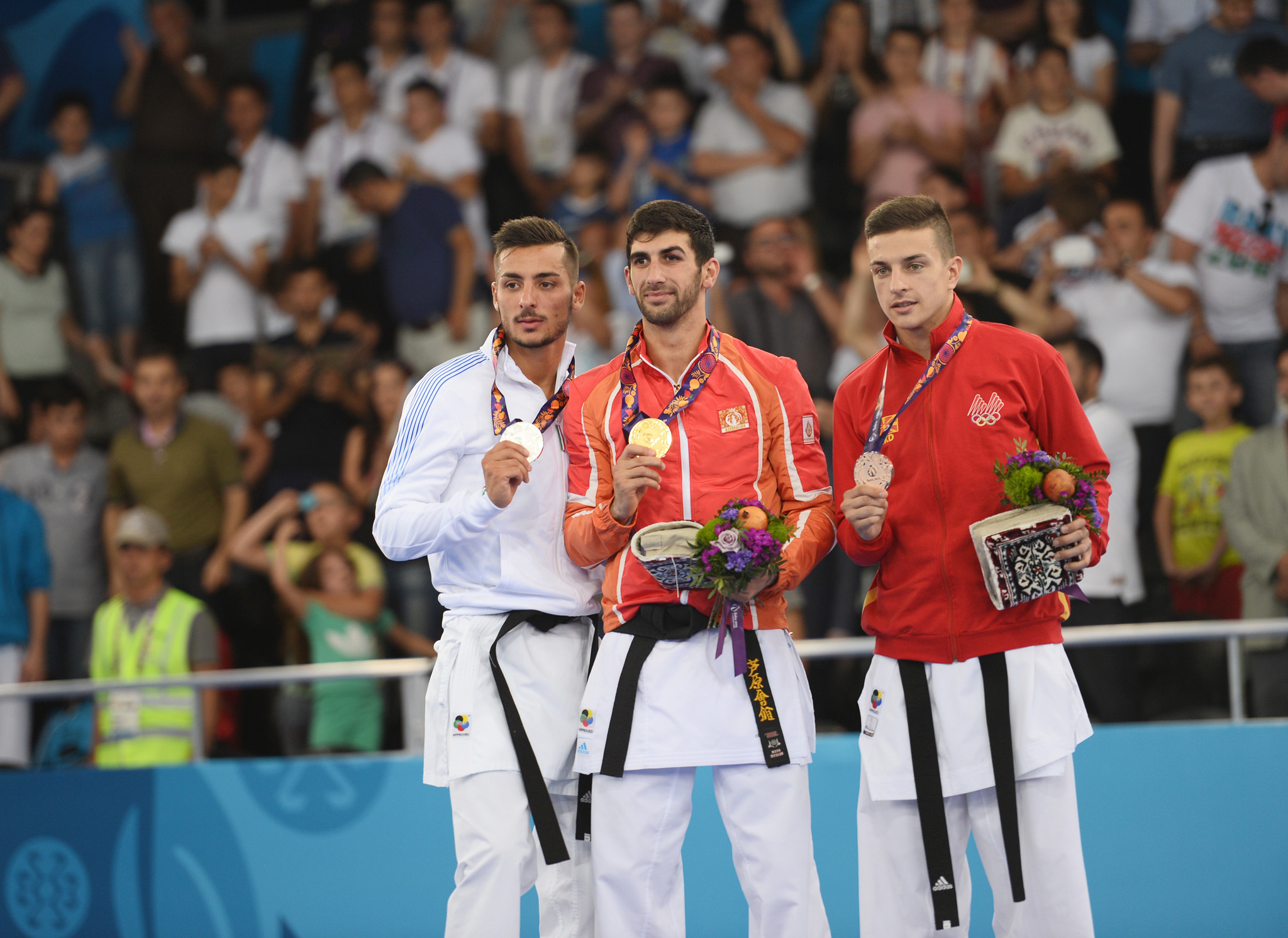
- Pavlov at the 2015 European Games (right)

Personal information
- Born: 1992 (age 33–34)

Sport
- Country: North Macedonia
- Sport: Karate
- Weight class: 60 kg; 67 kg
- Event: Kumite
Medal record
World Championships
Silver medal – second place	2021 Dubai	Kumite 67 kg
European Games
Bronze medal – third place	2015 Baku	Kumite 60 kg
European Championships
Gold medal – first place	2014 Tampere	Kumite 60 kg
Gold medal – first place	2018 Novi Sad	Kumite 60 kg
Bronze medal – third place	2016 Montpellier	Kumite 60 kg
Bronze medal – third place	2019 Guadalajara	Kumite 60 kg

Emil Pavlov (born 1992) is a Macedonian karateka. He won the silver medal in the men's 67 kg event at the 2021 World Karate Championships held in Dubai, United Arab Emirates. He is a two-time gold medalist in the men's 60 kg event at the European Karate Championships. He also won the bronze medal in the men's kumite 60 kg event at the 2015 European Games held in Baku, Azerbaijan.

At the 2018 Mediterranean Games held in Tarragona, Spain, Pavlov lost his bronze medal match in the men's kumite 60 kg event. In June 2021, he competed at the World Olympic Qualification Tournament held in Paris, France hoping to qualify for the 2020 Summer Olympics in Tokyo, Japan. He was eliminated in his second match by Sultan Al-Zahrani of Saudi Arabia.

Pavlov competed in the men's kumite 67 kg event at the 2022 World Games held in Birmingham, United States. He also competed in the men's kumite 67 kg event at the 2023 European Games held in Poland.
