= Yugo Kozaki =

Japanese karateka (born 1999)

Personal information
- Native name: 小崎友碁
- Nationality: Japanese
- Born: September 21, 1999 (age 27) Osaka Prefecture, Japan
- Education: Kindai University
- Employer: Saga Prefecture Sports Association

Sport
- Sport: Karate
- Events: Kumite, −67 kg
Medal record
Men's karate
Representing Japan
Asian Games
Silver medal – second place	2026 Aichi–Nagoya	Men's kumite −67 kg
World Games
Silver medal – second place	2025 Chengdu	Men's kumite −67 kg
Asian Karate Championships
Gold medal – first place	2025 Tashkent	Men's kumite −67 kg
Silver medal – second place	2024 Hangzhou	Men's kumite −67 kg
Silver medal – second place	2022 Tashkent	Men's kumite −67 kg

Yugo Kozaki (Japanese: 小崎友碁, born 21 September 1999) is a Japanese karateka who competes in men's kumite in the under-67 kg weight category. He represents the Saga Prefecture Sports Association and has won medals at the Asian Karate Championships, the World Games and the Asian Games. He won silver in the men's under-67 kg kumite event at the 2026 Asian Games in Aichi–Nagoya.

== Career ==
Kozaki began practising karate during childhood, influenced by his older brother. He attended Kindai University and later became affiliated with the Saga Prefecture Sports Association.

In 2022, Kozaki won the silver medal in the men's kumite under-67 kg category at the Asian Karate Championships in Tashkent, Uzbekistan. He repeated the result at the 2024 Asian Karate Championships in Hangzhou, China, and also won gold in the men's team kumite competition at the same championships.

In 2024, Kozaki won the men's adult middleweight kumite event at the 78th National Sports Festival of Japan, held as part of Saga 2024. In 2025, he won the men's under-67 kg kumite title at the Karate1 Premier League event in Paris and the Asian Karate Championships in Tashkent. He also won silver in the same weight category at the 2025 World Games in Chengdu, China.

Kozaki represented Japan in the men's kumite under-67 kg event at the 2026 Asian Games in Aichi–Nagoya. He advanced to the final, where he faced Uzbekistan's Abdul Vakhkhob Rashidov on 21 September 2026. Kozaki scored with an upper-level kick and briefly took the lead, but Rashidov regained the advantage and won the bout, leaving Kozaki with the silver medal. The result made Kozaki an Asian Games silver medallist in his first appearance at the competition.
