= Tural Aghalarzade =

Azerbaijani karateka

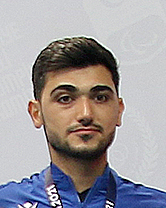

Sport
- Country: Azerbaijan
- Sport: Karate
- Weight class: 67 kg
- Events: Kumite; Team kumite
Medal record
Men's karate
Representing Azerbaijan
World Championships
Bronze medal – third place	2021 Dubai	Team kumite
European Championships
Gold medal – first place	2014 Tampere	Team kumite
Silver medal – second place	2022 Gaziantep	Team kumite
Bronze medal – third place	2015 Istanbul	Team kumite
Bronze medal – third place	2021 Poreč	Team kumite
Bronze medal – third place	2023 Guadalajara	Kumite 67 kg
European Games
Gold medal – first place	2023 Kraków-Małopolska	Kumite 67 kg
Islamic Solidarity Games
Bronze medal – third place	2021 Konya	Kumite 67 kg

Tural Aghalarzade is an Azerbaijani karateka. He won the gold medal in the men's 67 kg event at the 2023 European Games held in Poland. He won one of the bronze medals in the men's 67 kg event at the 2021 Islamic Solidarity Games held in Konya, Turkey.

In 2021, he won one of the bronze medals in the men's team kumite event at the World Karate Championships held in Dubai, United Arab Emirates.

== Achievements ==
Year	Competition	Venue	Rank	Event
2014	European Championships	Tampere, Finland	1st	Team kumite
2015	European Championships	Istanbul, Turkey	3rd	Team kumite
2021	European Championships	Poreč, Croatia	3rd	Team kumite
2021	World Championships	Dubai, United Arab Emirates	3rd	Team kumite
2022	European Championships	Gaziantep, Turkey	2nd	Team kumite
2022	Islamic Solidarity Games	Konya, Turkey	3rd	Kumite 67 kg
2023	European Championships	Guadalajara, Spain	3rd	Kumite 67 kg
2023	European Games	Kraków and Małopolska, Poland	1st	Kumite 67 kg
