= Jordan Thomas (karateka) =

British karateka (born 1992)

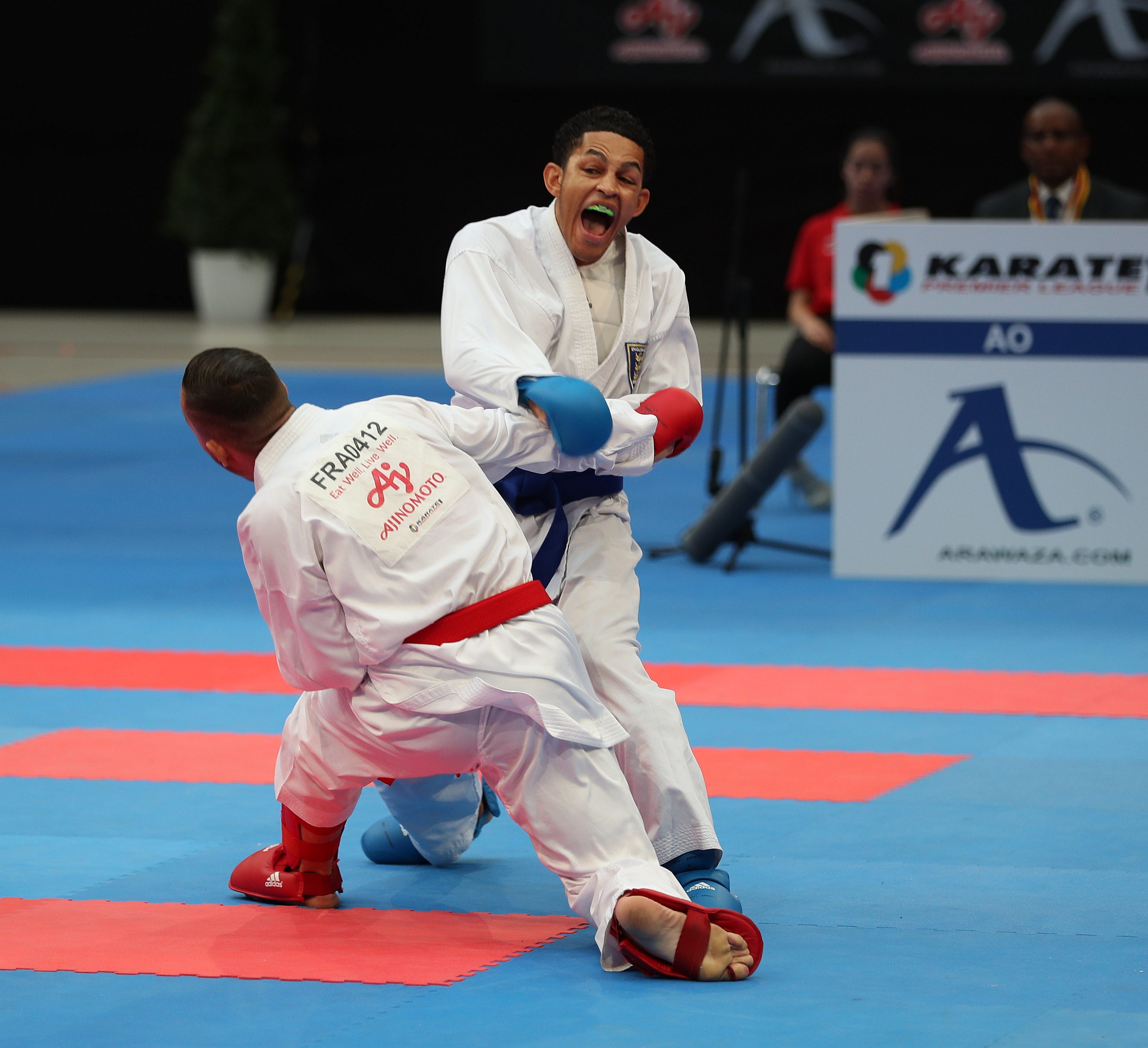
- Jordan Thomas in 2018
- Born: Jordan Nathaniel Jean Thomas; 10 March 1992 (age 34); Luton, England
- Style: Kumite
- Rank: World Champion (−67 kg)

Jordan Thomas (born 10 March 1992) is a British karateka. In 2016, he became the first British Karate World Champion in 12 years, since Paul Newby's gold medal in 2004. Thomas was also the first British World Games Finalist in 16 Years, the last being Jason Ledgister in 2001. His first major title, in 2014, made him the first British European Karate Champion in 8 years. He is the son of William Thomas who won the 1992 World Karate Championships.

== Career ==
Training with the Kaizen Central Karate Federation, Thomas became the 2014 −67 kg Senior European Karate Champion after defeating Aliyev Niyazi from Azerbaijan in the final in Tampere, Finland.

At the 2016 World Karate Championships in Linz, Austria, Thomas took gold in the Kumite −67 kg weight.

In June 2021, he competed at the World Olympic Qualification Tournament held in Paris, France hoping to qualify for the 2020 Summer Olympics in Tokyo, Japan.

On 24 January 2022, GB Taekwondo announced that in a new bid to become an Olympian, Thomas had been selected for and joined the GB Taekwondo World Class Performance program, and is now "looking to make his mark in taekwondo" as part of the Paris 2024 cycle. He is expected to compete in the −68 kg category.
