= Yves Martial Tadissi =

Hungarian karateka (born 1991)

Personal information
- Born: 26 August 1991 (age 34)

Sport
- Country: Hungary
- Sport: Karate
- Weight class: 67 kg
- Event: Kumite
Medal record
Men's karate
Representing Hungary
World Championships
Silver medal – second place	2016 Linz	Kumite 67 kg
World Games
Silver medal – second place	2022 Birmingham	Kumite 67 kg
European Games
Bronze medal – third place	2019 Minsk	Kumite 67 kg
European Championships
Gold medal – first place	2024 Zadar	Kumite 67 kg
Bronze medal – third place	2014 Tampere	Kumite 67 kg
Bronze medal – third place	2016 Montpellier	Kumite 67 kg
Bronze medal – third place	2018 Novi Sad	Kumite 67 kg
Bronze medal – third place	2019 Guadalajara	Kumite 67 kg

Yves Martial Tadissi (born 26 August 1991) is a Hungarian karateka. He won the silver medal in the men's 67 kg kumite event at the 2016 World Karate Championships held in Linz, Austria. He is also a four-time bronze medalist in this event at the European Karate Championships.

== Career ==
He competed in the men's 67 kg event at the 2017 World Games held in Wrocław, Poland. He won one match and lost two matches in the elimination round and he did not advance to compete in the semi-finals.

In 2018, he competed in the men's 67 kg event at the World Karate Championships held in Madrid, Spain. In 2019, he won one of the bronze medals in the men's kumite 67 kg event at the European Games held in Minsk, Belarus.

In June 2021, he reached the round-robin stage in his weight class at the World Olympic Qualification Tournament in Paris, France where he failed to qualify to compete at the 2020 Summer Olympics in Tokyo, Japan. In November 2021, he lost his bronze medal match in the men's 67 kg event at the 2021 World Karate Championships held in Dubai, United Arab Emirates.

He won the silver medal in the men's kumite 67 kg event at the 2022 World Games held in Birmingham, United States. He competed in the men's kumite 67 kg event at the 2023 European Games held in Poland.

He won the gold medal in the men's 67 kg event at the 2024 European Karate Championships held in Zadar, Croatia.

== Achievements ==
Year	Competition	Venue	Rank	Event
2014	European Championships	Tampere, Finland	3rd	Kumite 67 kg
2016	European Championships	Montpellier, France	3rd	Kumite 67 kg
2016	World Championships	Linz, Austria	2nd	Kumite 67 kg
2018	European Championships	Novi Sad, Serbia	3rd	Kumite 67 kg
2019	European Championships	Guadalajara, Spain	3rd	Kumite 67 kg
2019	European Games	Minsk, Belarus	3rd	Kumite 67 kg
2022	World Games	Birmingham, United States	2nd	Kumite 67 kg
2024	European Championships	Zadar, Croatia	1st	Kumite 67 kg
