= Burak Uygur =

Turkish karateka (born 1995)

- Born: April 14, 1995 (age 31)
- Nationality: Turkish
- Division: 67 kg
- Style: Karate Kumite
- Team: Istanbul BB SK

Burak Uygur (born April 14, 1995) is a European and European Games champion Turkish karateka competing in the kumite 67 kg division. He is a member of İstanbul Büyükşehir Belediyesi S.K.

== Achievements ==
2015

- Gold 1st European Games – 13 June, Baku, AZE – kumite 67 kg
- Silver European Championships – 19 March, Istanbul, TUR – kumite 67 kg

2017

- Gold European Championships – 6 May, İzmit, TUR – kumite 67 kg
