= Wrocław Exhibition Grounds =

Wrocław Exhibition Grounds Polish: Tereny Wystawowe we Wrocławiu
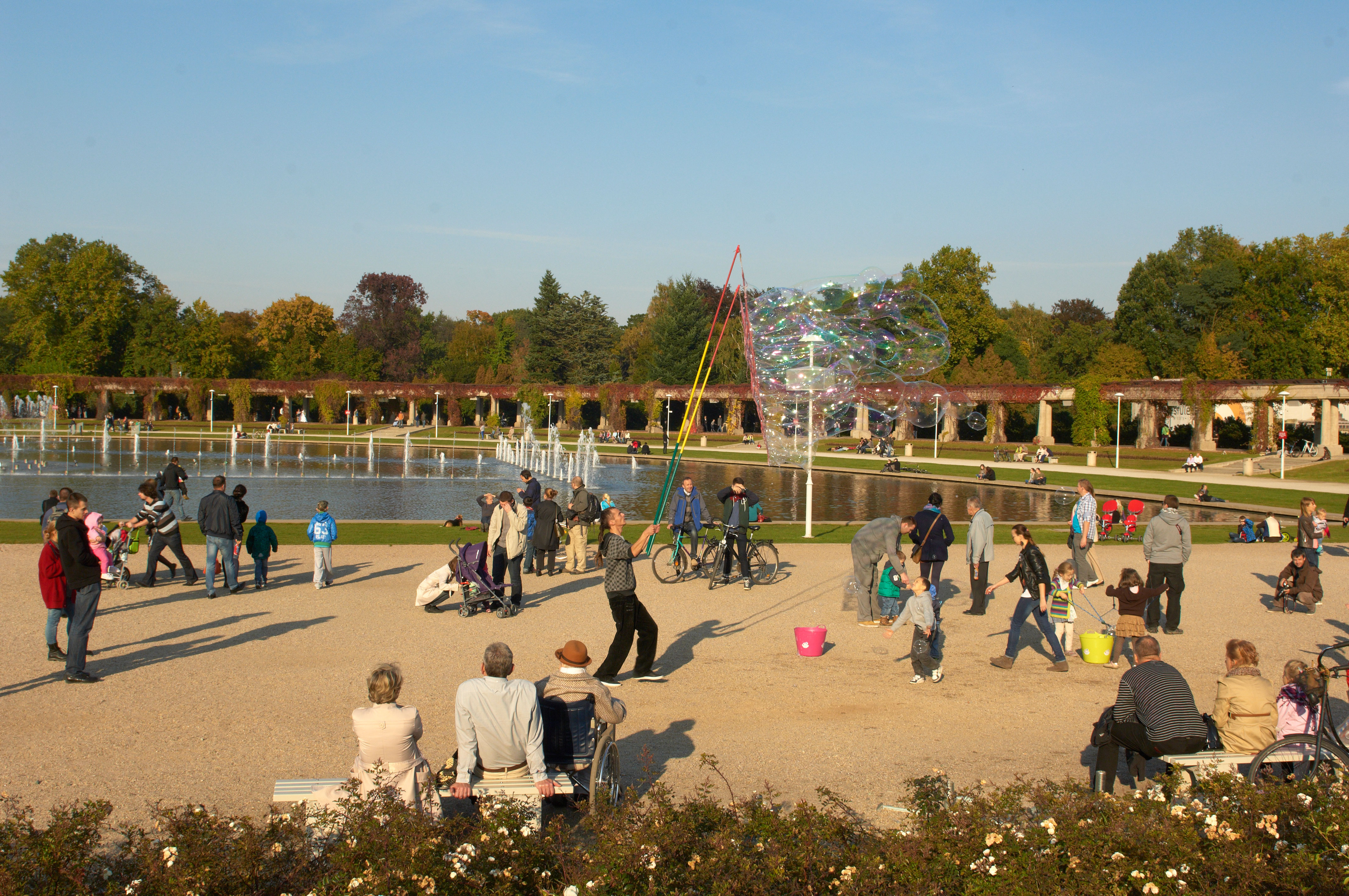
- Pergola in Wrocław

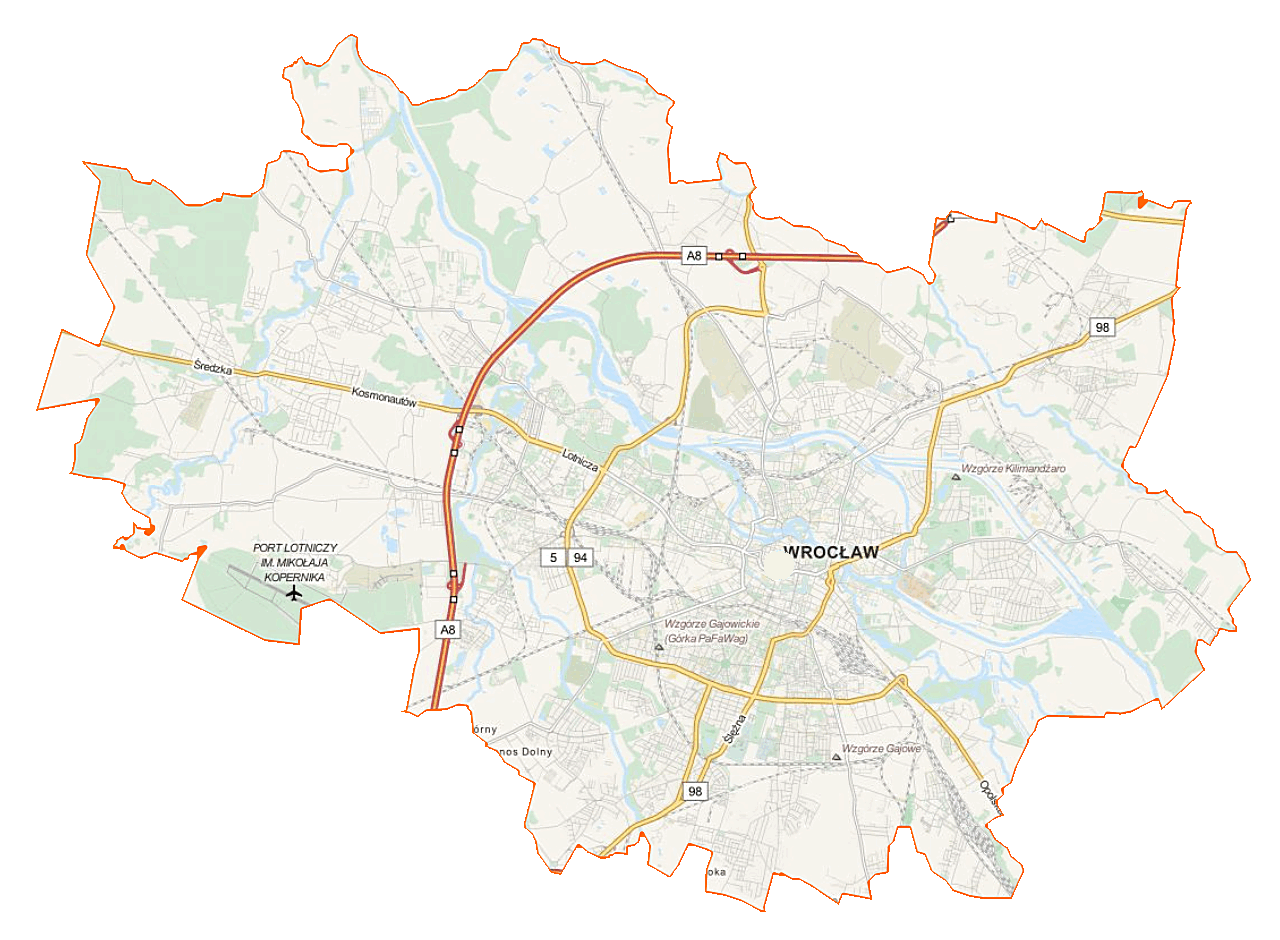
- Location within Wrocław
- 51°06′28″N 17°04′41″E
- Location: Wrocław, Poland

History
- Design period: 1911
- Built: 1913
- Built for: Centennial Exhibition

Site notes
- Architect(s): Max Berg and Hans Poelzig
- Architectural style: Expressionist architecture

The Wrocław Exhibition Grounds (Polish: Tereny Wystawowe we Wrocławiu) are located in the eastern part of Wrocław, Poland, close to the city's zoological garden. Its construction works took place in 1911–1913, following the project of Max Berg and Hans Poelzig.

== History ==
The Exhibition Grounds were designed to honor the centennial anniversary of king Frederick Wilhelm III's 1813 proclamation to the German nation (An Mein Volk) and the anniversary of the Battle of Leipzig. In 1913, the Centennial Exhibition was held here.

The site survived the World War II without any significant damage. In 1948, the Recovered Territories Exhibition was held at this venue.

== Description ==
Currently the Exhibition Grounds include:

- The Centennial Hall, one of the main tourist attractions in Wrocław (listed as a UNESCO World Heritage Site in 2006;
- Pergola, build around a pond where the Wrocław Multimedia Fountain, one of the largest in Europe, was constructed in 2009;
- The Japanese Garden, established as a part of the Exhibition Complex;
- The Four Domes Pavilion, located northwest of the Centennial Hall. It was designed by Hans Poelzig and constructed from August 1912 to February 1913. The fountain of the goddess Athena, which was destroyed during World War II, used to be located in the courtyard of the building. At present it houses a division of the National Museum.

== See also ==
- Cupid on the Pegasus
