= Wrocław Multimedia Fountain =

Dancing fountain in Wrocław, Poland

- Wrocławska Fontanna Multimedialna
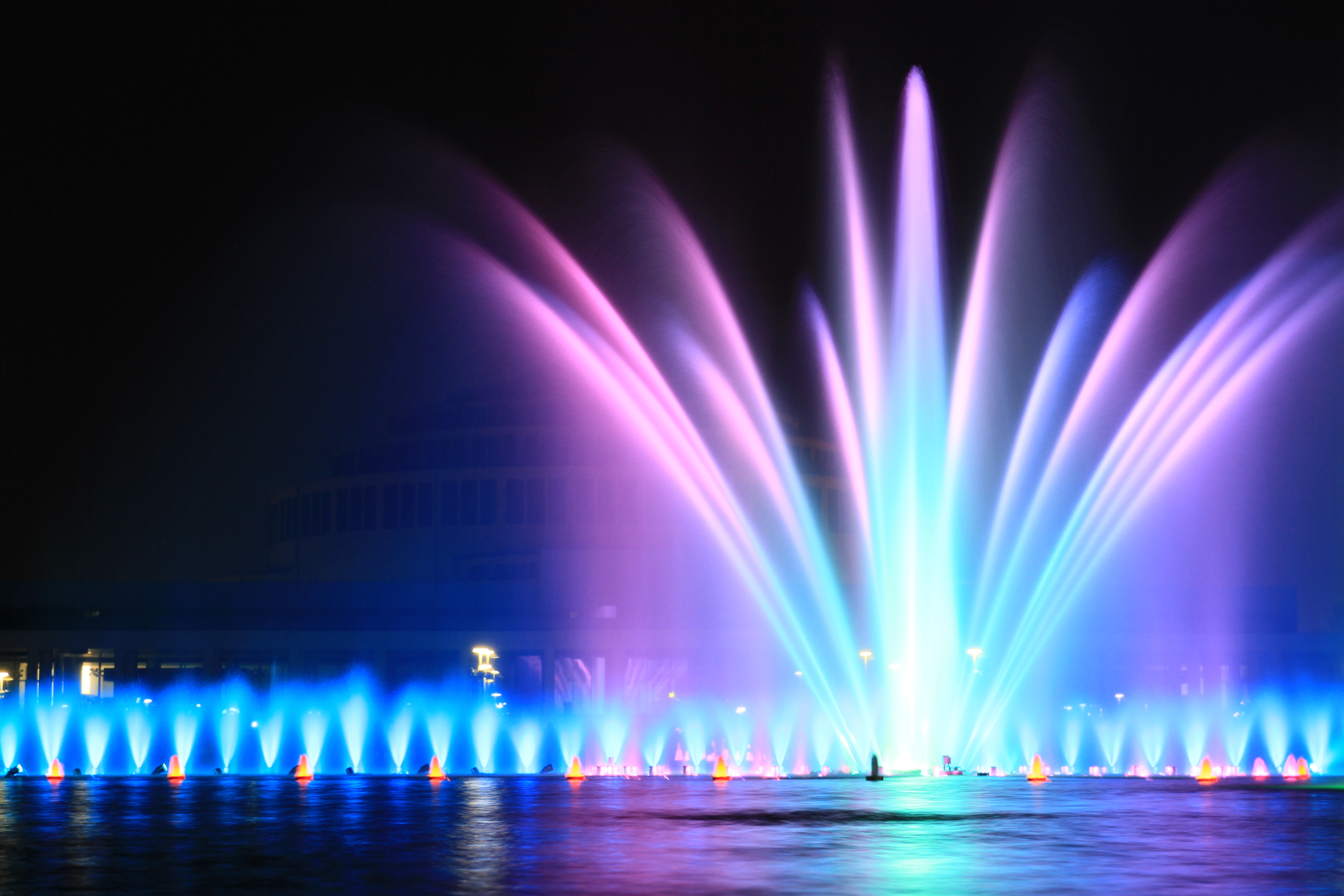
- Interactive map of the Wrocław Multimedia Fountain area

General information
- Type: Dancing fountain
- Architectural style: Contemporary
- Location: Wrocław exhibition ground, Wrocław, Poland
- Coordinates: 51°06′32″N 17°04′44″E
- Completed: June 4, 2009
- Owner: City Hall Company Ltd. of Wrocław

Dimensions
- Other dimensions: 1 hectare

Design and construction
- Main contractor: Gutkowski Company

Website
- https://halastulecia.pl/en/sightseeing/multimedia-fountain/

The Wrocław Multimedia Fountain (Polish: Wrocławska Fontanna Multimedialna) is a multimedia musical fountain and ornamental pond in Wrocław, of western Poland. The fountain runs only during the summer season, from the last weekend of April or the first weekend of May to late October.

Built in 2009, it is currently one of the largest operating fountains in Europe.

== Description ==
The Wrocław Fountain is located in the historic Wrocław Exhibition Grounds, next to the early modernist Centennial Hall, and encircled within the Wrocław Pergola.

=== Multimedia show ===
The 1 hectare (110,000 ft^{2}) fountain incorporates over 300 jets to create moving-dancing screens of water. They are used, with music and light, by a computerized multimedia program for animated water shows.

The fountain is renowned for its nightly displays. It is illuminated by 800 computer-programmed colored lights.

Ice skating

When frozen in winter, the fountain is drained for a 4,700 square metres (51,000 ft^{2}) ice skating rink to take some of its space.

== Gallery ==
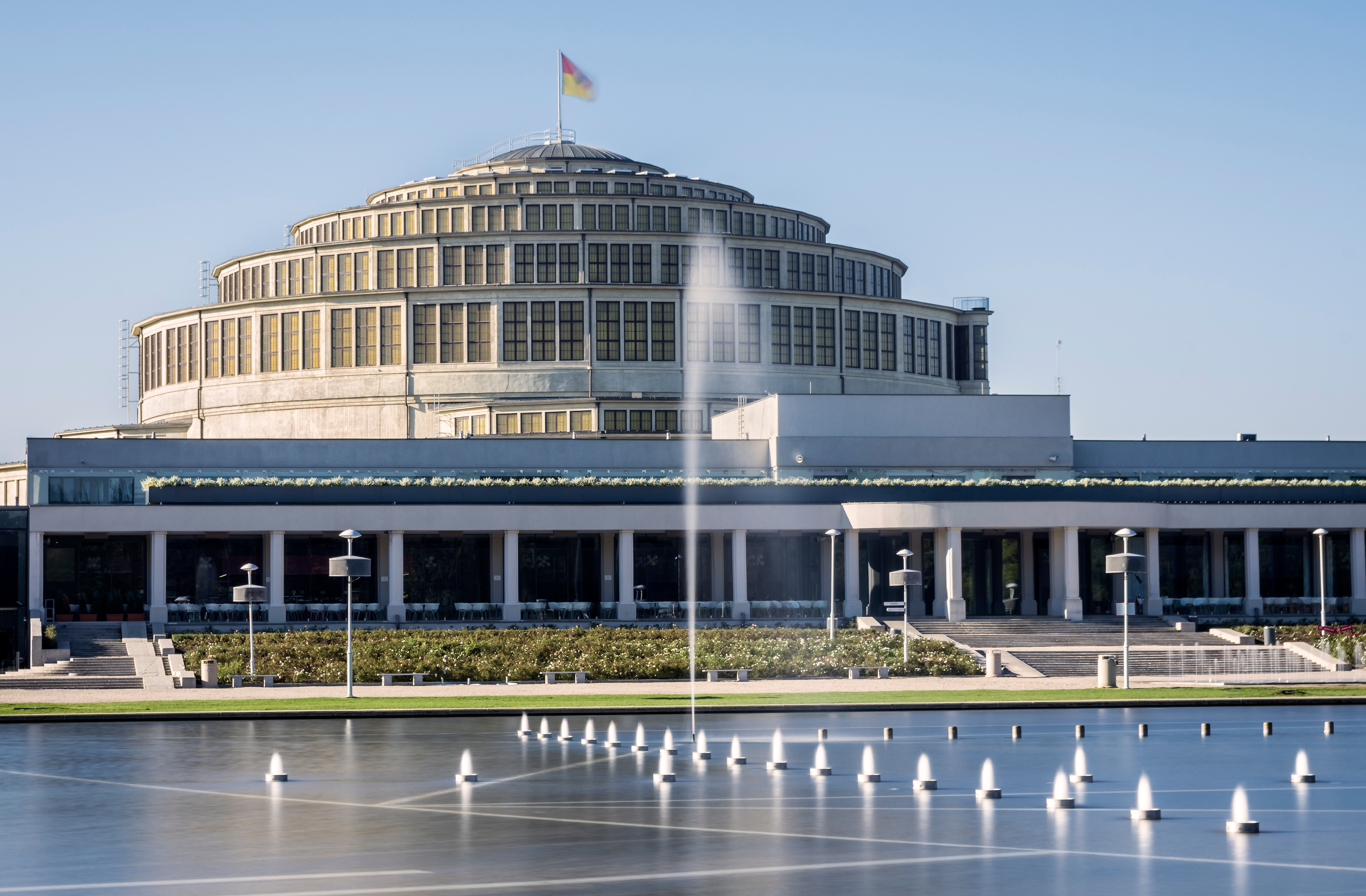
Wrocław Multimedia Fountain in daytime, with historic Centennial Hall beyond

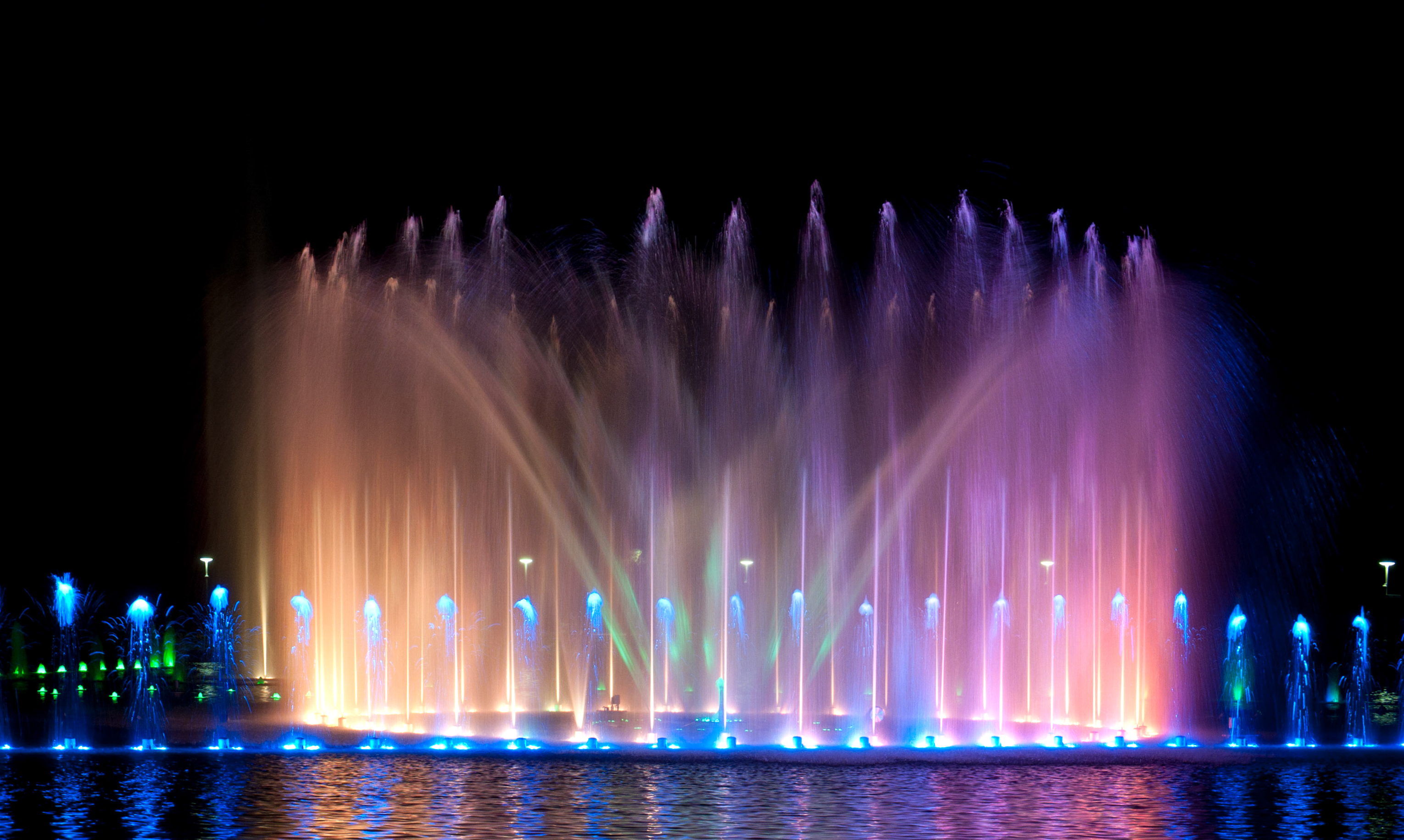
Wrocław Multimedia Fountain illuminated at night during a program

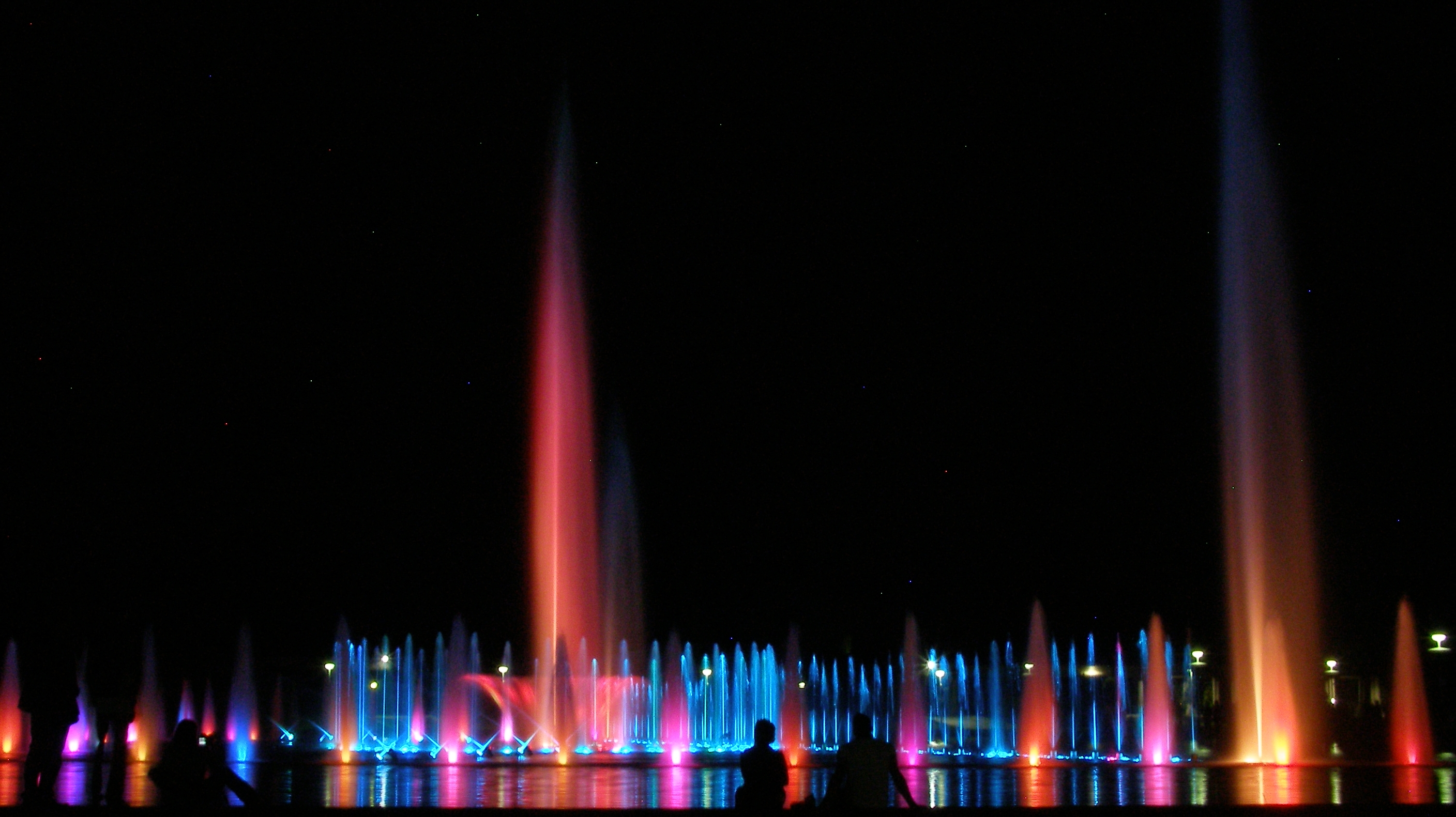
Wrocław Multimedia Fountain at night

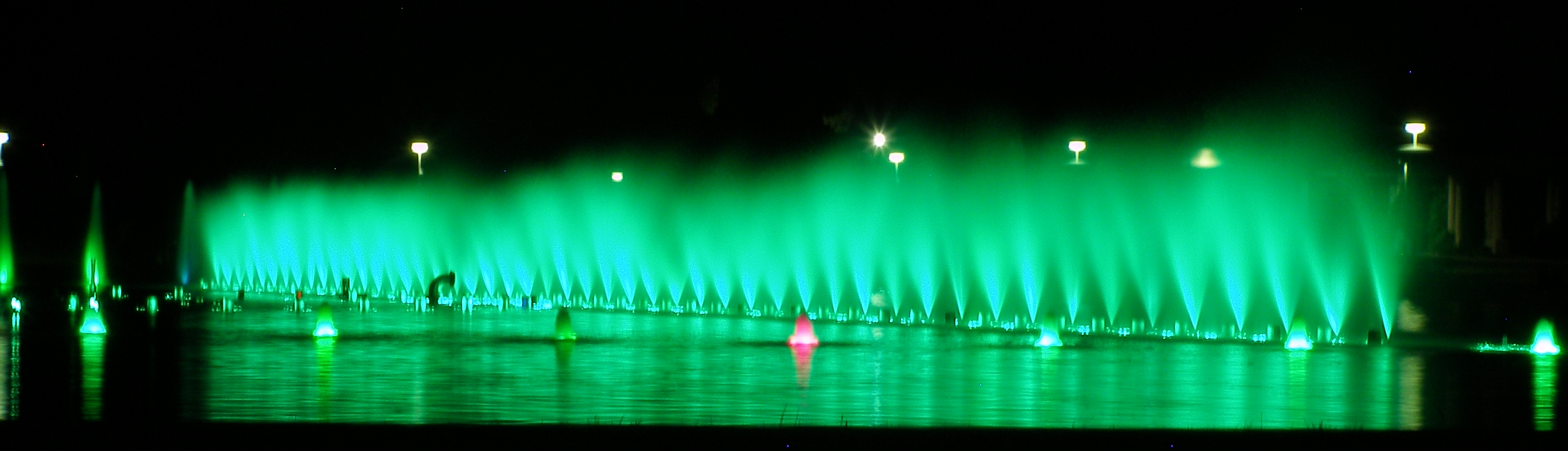
Wrocław Multimedia Fountain at night

== See also ==
- Sequencing fountain
- Centennial Hall (1913) — a modernist UNESCO World Heritage Site.
- Index: Fountains in Europe
