= Iglica =

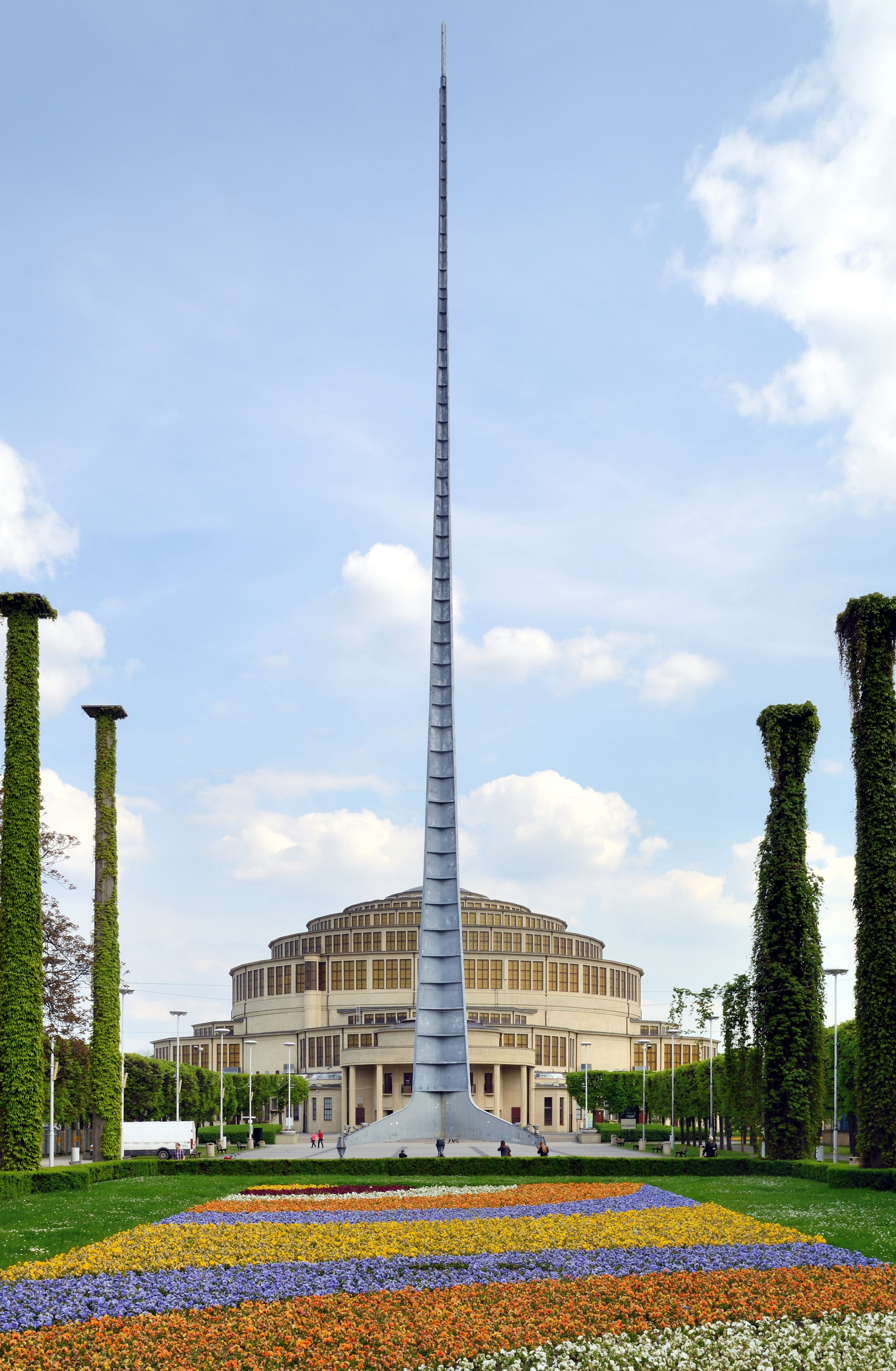
- Iglica against the background of the Centennial Hall
- Interactive map of the Iglica area

General information
- Type: Monument, sculpture
- Location: Wrocław, Poland
- Coordinates: 51.10754°N 17.07554°E
- Construction started: 1948
- Completed: 3 July 1948 (77 years ago)

Height
- Antenna spire: 90.3 m (296.3 ft)

Design and construction
- Architect: Stanisław Hempel
- Engineer: Mostostal

Iglica (Polish: [iɡˈlit͡sa]; "spire" or "needle") is a needle-like monument in Wrocław, Poland. It was built in 1948 and was 106 metres tall. Today, after renovation, the top ten metres have been removed and it is now 90 metres tall.

== History ==
This structure was constructed by Polish Communists for an exhibition to celebrate regaining control over the "Regained Territories" after the Second World War with Stanisław Hempel being chosen as the designer. The Iglica is located very close to the Centennial Hall. Considering the hall's German origin, planners decided to build a spire next to it that could become a symbol of Polish Wrocław and Polish technology.

It was originally topped by a spinning contraption of mirrors, creating an "umbrella of light" at night, but this was struck by lightning within a day of completion, and prior to the official opening. The remnants of this damaged structure were apparently removed by two climbing enthusiasts at no cost, the military being unable to tackle the task.

The spire was named one of Poland's official national Historic Monuments (Pomnik historii), as designated 20 April 2005, together with the Four Domes Pavilion, the Pergola, and Centennial Hall. Its listing is maintained by the National Institute of Cultural Heritage.

== See also ==
- Spire of Dublin – similar design with a height of 120 metres, but of stainless steel and newer.
- List of towers
