= Centennial Hall (Wrocław) =

Historic building in Wrocław, Poland

- Hala Stulecia
- Logo of the Centennial Hall

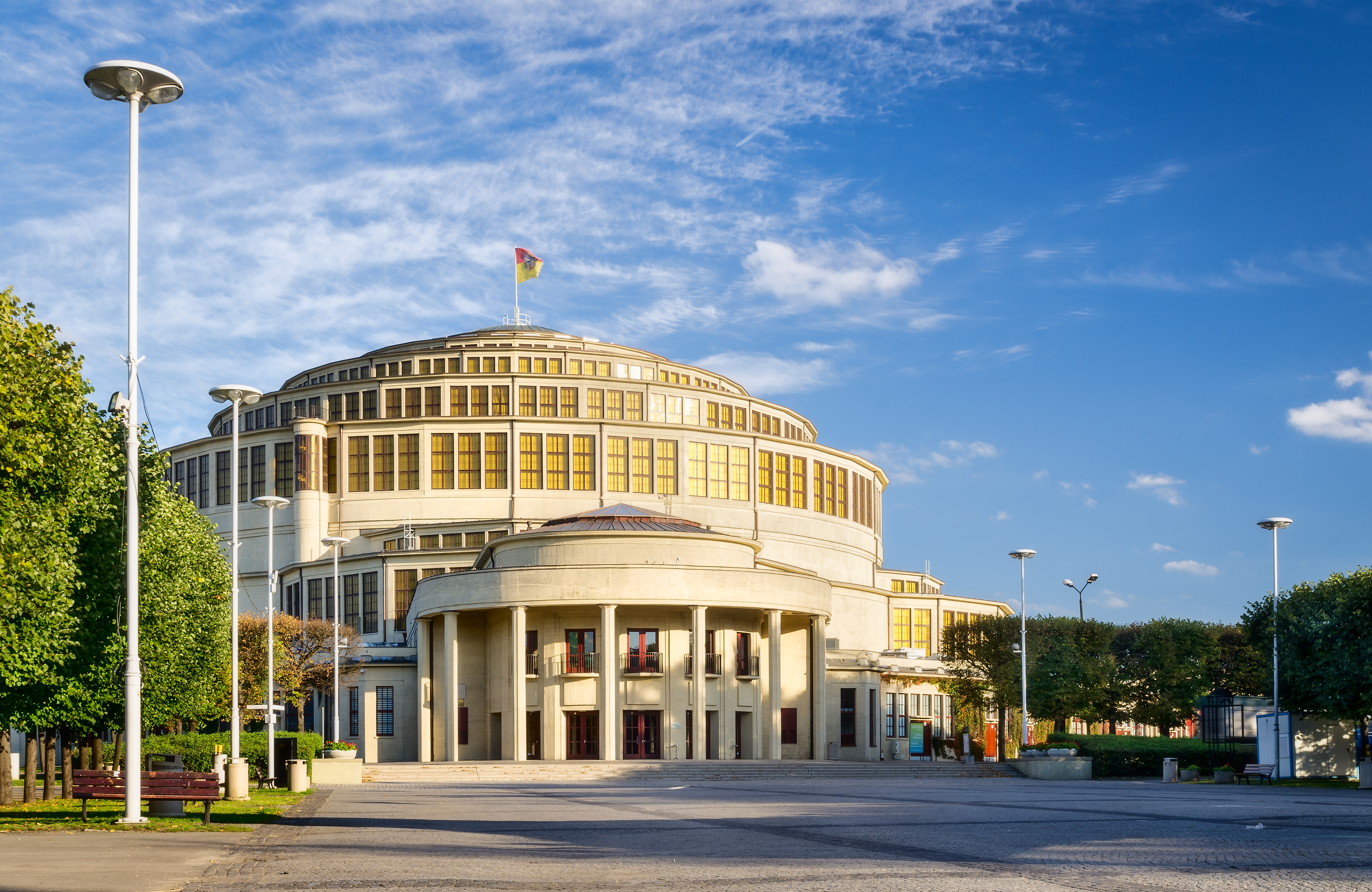
- Centennial Hall after renovation in 2009
- Interactive map of Centennial Hall
- Full name: Hala Stulecia
- Former names: Hala Ludowa
- Location: Wrocław, Lower Silesia, Poland
- Coordinates: 51°06′25″N 17°04′38″E
- Owner: City of Wrocław
- Operator: City Hall Company Ltd. of Wrocław
- Capacity: Boxing: 11,000; Handball: 8,500; Basketball: 10,000; Volleyball: 10,000

Construction
- Groundbreaking: 1911
- Built: 1913
- Opened: 20 May 1913
- Renovated: 2009–2011
- Architect: Max Berg
- Structural engineers: Günther Trauer, Richard Konwiarz, Heinrich Müller-Breslau
- Main contractor: Dyckerhoff & Widmann AG (Dywidag)

Tenant
- WKS Śląsk Wrocław (major attendance games)

UNESCO World Heritage Site
- Official name: Centennial Hall in Wrocław
- Type: Cultural
- Criteria: i, ii, iv
- Designated: 2006 (30th session)
- Reference no.: 1165
- Region: Europe and North America

Historic Monument of Poland
- Designated: 2005-04-13
- Reference no.: Dz. U. z 2005 r. Nr 64, poz. 570

The Centennial Hall (Polish: Hala Stulecia [ˈxala stuˈlɛt͡ɕa]); German: Jahrhunderthalle), formerly named People's Hall (Hala Ludowa), is a historic building in Wrocław, Poland. It was constructed according to the plans of architect Max Berg in 1911–1913. Max Berg designed Centennial Hall to serve as a multifunctional structure to host "exhibitions, concerts, theatrical and opera performances, and sporting events". The hall continues to be used for sporting events, business summits, and concerts.

As an early landmark of reinforced concrete architecture, the building became one of Poland's official national Historic Monuments (Pomnik historii), as designated 20 April 2005, together with the Four Domes Pavilion, the Pergola, and the Iglica. Its listing is maintained by the National Heritage Board of Poland. It was also listed as a UNESCO World Heritage Site in 2006.

== History ==
It was in the Silesian capital of Breslau where, on 10 March 1813, King Frederick William III of Prussia called upon the Prussian people his proclamation An Mein Volk ("To My People") to rise up against Napoleon's occupation. In this proclamation king Frederick created also the Iron Cross award, which later became the most famous German military honor and symbol. In October of that year, Napoleon was defeated at the Battle of Leipzig.

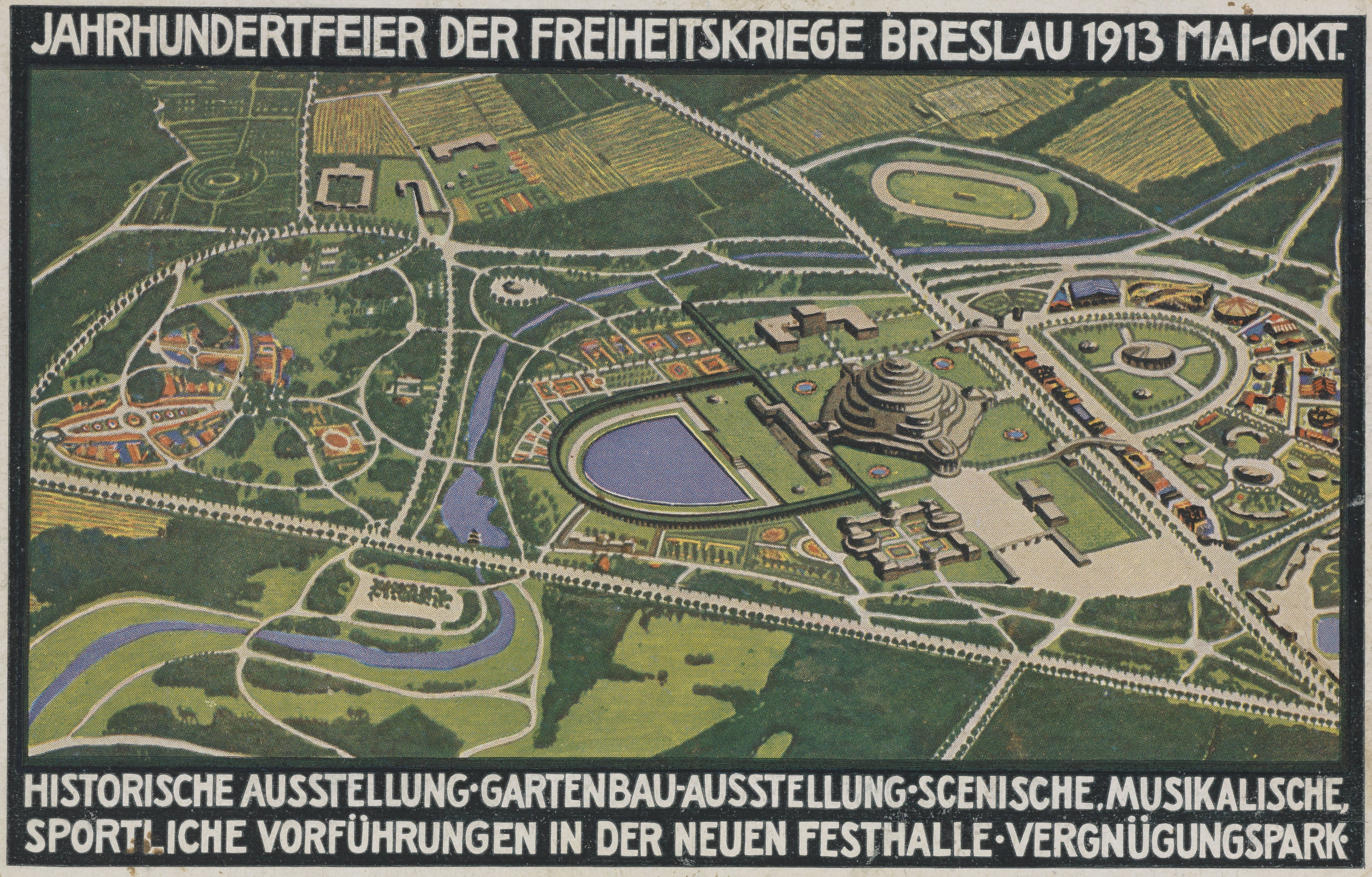
Exhibition Grounds in 1913

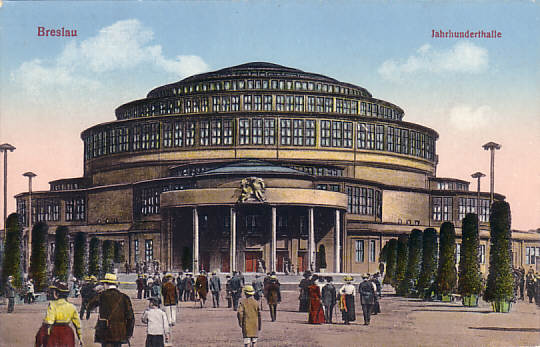
Jahrhunderthalle in 1920

The opening of the hall was part of the celebration commemorating the 100th anniversary of the battle in the German Empire, hence the name Jahrhunderthalle. Breslau's municipal authorities had vainly awaited state funding and ultimately had to defray the enormous costs out of their own pockets. The landscaping and buildings surrounding the hall were laid out by Hans Poelzig and were opened on 20 May 1913 in the presence of Crown Prince William of Hohenzollern. The grounds include a huge pond with fountains enclosed by a huge concrete pergola in the form of half an ellipse. Beyond this, to the north, a Japanese garden was created. The Silesian author Gerhart Hauptmann had specially prepared a play Festspiel in deutschen Reimen for the occasion, however, the staging by Max Reinhardt was suspended by national-conservative circles for its antimilitaristic tendencies.

After the memorial events, the building served as a multi-purpose recreational building, situated in the Exhibition Grounds, previously used for horse racing. In 1931, it was one of the host venues of a rally of Der Stahlhelm, Bund der Frontsoldaten, at which its members declared their disapproval of the interwar German-Polish border and expressed irredentist claims towards Poland and Lithuania.

It was largely spared from devastation during the Siege of Breslau in World War II. After the war, when the city had become part of Poland according to the 1945 Potsdam Agreement, the hall was renamed Hala Ludowa ("People's Hall") by the Soviet-installed communist authorities. In 1948, a 106 m (348 ft) high needle-like metal sculpture called Iglica was set up in front of it. The hall was extensively renovated in 1997 and in 2010. Recently the Polish translation of the original German name, Hala Stulecia, became official.

Centennial Hall hosted EuroBasket 1963 and a preliminary round group of the EuroBasket 2009 tournament. It also hosted the 1997 World Wrestling Championships, 2000 European Judo Championships, 2009 Women's European Volleyball Championship, 2013 World Weightlifting Championships, 2014 FIVB Volleyball Men's World Championship and 2016 European Men's Handball Championship.

Following the renovation in 2009–11, the arena can now hold 10,000 people. In October 2014, the building received a $200,000 renovation grant from the Getty Foundation, as part of the Keeping It Modern grant program that was created a month earlier by the American foundation.

The building was used to film scenes inside of the arena in The Hunger Games: The Ballad of Songbirds and Snakes.

== Architecture ==
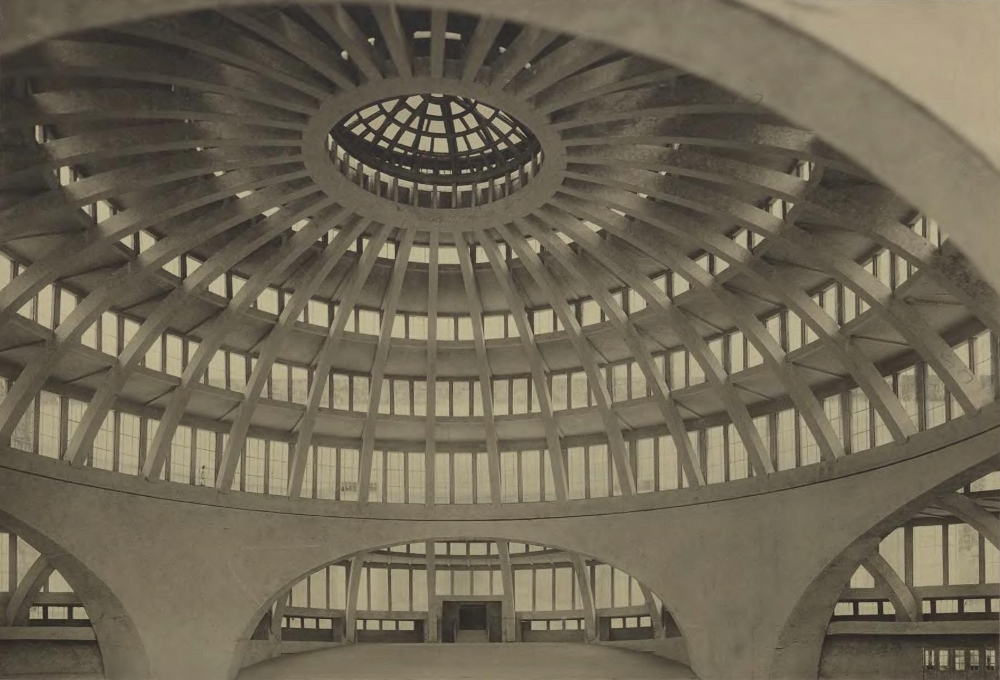
The interior of the hall

The cupola modeled on the Centennial Hall was made of reinforced concrete, and with an inner diameter of 69 m (226 ft) and height of 42 m (138 ft) it was the largest building of its kind at the time of construction. The symmetrical quatrefoil shape with a large circular central space seats 7,000 persons. The dome itself is 23 m (75 ft) high, made of steel and glass. The Jahrhunderthalle became a key reference for the development of reinforced concrete structures in the 20th century.

At the centre of the structure a superior dome with lantern is situated. Looking from the inside, there is a clearly visible pattern of the Iron Cross at the top of the dome; for this reason the centre of the structure was shrouded during the Communist era in Poland.

=== Organs ===
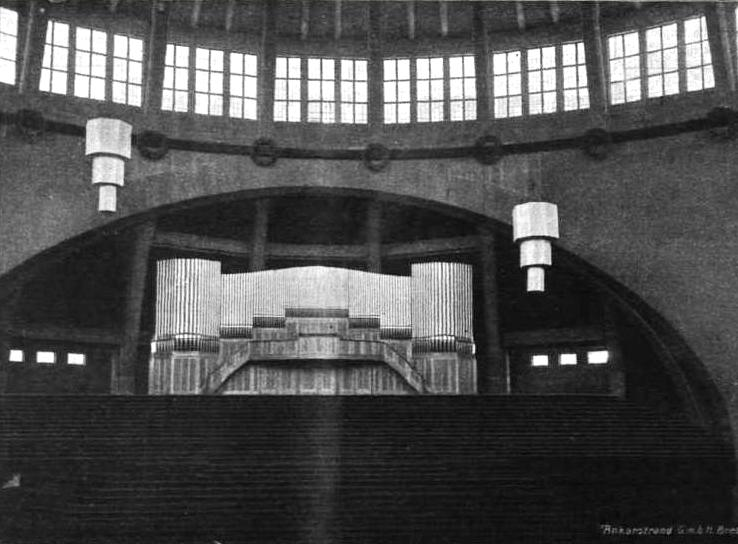
Orgel der Jahrhunderthalle

The hall was originally provided with a Sauer pipe organ built by Walcker Orgelbau, which then, with 15,133 pipes and 200 stops, ranked as the world's largest. On 24 September 1913, Karl Straube was the first to play it, performing Max Reger's Introduction, Passacaglia and Fugue, Op. 127, specially composed to celebrate the occasion. Most parts of the organ were transferred to the rebuilt Wrocław Cathedral after World War II.

Disposition of the organ from 1913
Individual voices are color-coded: tongue voices, mixtures. Length of the largest pipe of a given voice given in feet, where 8' ≈ 2.5 m
I. Manual C-c^{4}	II. Manual Schwellwerk C-c^{4}	III. Manual Schwellwerk C-c^{4}	IV. Manual Schwellwerk C-c^{4} Hochdruckwerk	V. Manual Schwellwerk C-c^{4} Fernwerk	Pedal C-g^{1} 44 Töne C-g²
Principal 16’ Majorbaß 16’ Gedackt 16’ Principal 8’ Principal amabile 8’ Geigenprincipal 8’ Viola di Gamba 8’ HD Stentor Gamba 8’ Harmonika 8’ Doppelflöte 8’ Flute harmonique 8’ Flauto dolce 8’ Spitzflöte 8’ Gedackt 8’ Gemshorn 8’ Quintatön 8’ HD Groß-Octave 4’ Octave 4’ Flute Octaviante 4’ Gemshorn 4’ Rohrflöte 4’ Violini 4’ Viol d’amour 4’ Gedacktquinte 5 1/3’ Quinte 2 2/3’ HD Piccolo 2’ Octave 2’ Rauschquinte 2 2/3’, 2’ Progressio III-IV; Groß-Cymbel V-VI; Scharf III; Mixtur III-IV; Mixtur IV-V; Groß-Mixtur VII-IX; Kornett V Posaune 16’ HD Tuba mirabilis 8’ Basson 8’ Trompete 8’ HD Oboe 8’ HD Clairon 4’ Clarine 4’ II-I; III-I; IV-I; V-I; Sub II-I; Super II-I	Gamba major 16'; Quintatön 16'; HD Stentorprincipal 8'; Principal 8'; Schalmei 8'; Viola 8'; HD Stentorflöte 8'; Flute harmonique 8'; Soloflöte 8'; Quintatön 8'; Flauto dolce 8'; Dulciana 8'; Geigenprincipal 8'; Flötenprincipal 8'; Bourdon 8'; Harmonika 8'; Vox angelica 8'; Oktave 4'; Jubalflöte 4'; Fugara 4'; Zartflöte 4'; Dolce 4'; Quintatön 4'; HD Flute Octaviante 4'; Quinte 2 2/3'; Sesquialter II; Piccolo 2'; Mixtur III; Kornett IV; HD Groß-Kornett III-V; Cymbel III; Scharf V HD Bombarde 16'; Basson 16'; Posaune 8'; HD Trompete 8'; Cor anglais 8'; Klarinette 8'; Clairon 4'; Glockenspiel, 30 Töne; Pizzicato für Glockenspiele; III-II; IV-II; V-II; Sub III-II; Super III-II	Nachthorn 16'; Salicional 16'; Prinzipal 8'; Flötenprincipal 8'; Geigenprincipal 8'; Nachthorn 8'; Jubalflöte 8'; Quintatön 8'; Spitzflöte 8'; Violoncello 8'; Wienerflöte 8'; Flaute d’amour 8'; Gedackt 8'; Gemshorn 8'; Salicional 8'; Aeoline 8'; Voix celeste 8'; Praestant 4'; Nachthorn 4'; Rohrflöte 4'; Violini 4'; Flaute d’amour 4'; Bifra 8', 4’ Dulciana 4'; Gemshorn 4'; Flautino 2'; Sifflöte 1'; Nassat 2 2/3'; Rauschquinte 2 2/3’, 2’ Harmonia aetheria III; Kornett V Mixtur IV; Scharf III; Cymbel IV; Groß-Cymbel VII; Fagott 16'; Trompete harmonique 8'; Oboe 8'; Klarinette 8'; Vox Humana 8'; Trompete 4'; IV-III; V-III; Sub III; Super III	Majorbaß 16'; Stentorprinzipal 8'; Stentorgamba 8'; Stentorflöte 8'; Oktave 4'; Flute Octaviante 4'; Piccolo II 2'; Groß-Kornett III-V; Bombarde 16'; Tuba mirabilis 8'; Trompete 8'; Oboe 8'; Clairon 4'; V-IV; Sub IV; Super IV	Dulciana 16'; Bourdon 16'; Principal 8'; Hohflöte 8'; Viola di Gamba 8'; Aeoline 8'; Voix celeste 8'; Quintatön 8'; Flute harmonique 8'; Gedackt 8'; Oktave 4'; Flauto Dolce 4'; Flageolett 2'; Mixtur III; Kornett III-IV; Baßtuba 16'; Tuba 8'; Trompete 8'; Basson 8'; Klarinette 8'; Vox Humana 8'; Clarine 4'; Glockenspiel, 25 Töne; Sub V Super V	Principal 32'; Untarsatz 32'; Kontaviolon 32'; HD Kontrabass 16'; Principal 16'; Violon 16'; Subbaß 16'; Gemshorn 16'; Harmonikabaß 16'; Lieblich Gedackt 16'; Quintbaß 10 2/3'; Principal 8'; HD Oktavbaß 8'; Violoncello 8'; Gemshorn 8'; Flötenbaß 8'; Gedacktbaß 8'; Dulciana 8'; Quinte 5 1/3'; Groß-Rauschquinte 5 1/3, 4'; HD Oktave 4'; Spitzflöte 4'; Fugara 4'; Sesquialter II; Oktave 2'; Kornett IV-V; Kontaposaune 32'; Posaune 16'; Fagott 16'; Trompete 8'; Ophikleide 8'; Baßklarinette 8'; Clairon 4' Fernpedal; Violon 16'; Subbaß 16'; Dolce 16'; Viola 8'; Baßflöte 8'; Dolce 8'; Oktave 4'; Trompete 8'; I-P; II-P; III-P; IV-P; V-P; Super P

Additional registers: Handregistierung, Freie Kombination 1, Freie Kombination 2, Freie Kombination 3, Freie Kombination I, Freie Kombination II, Freie Kombination III, Freie Kombination IV, Freie Kombination V, Freie Kombination P, Walze (Crescendo) I – III und Pedal, Tutti mit Fernorgel, Tutti ohne Fernorgel, Fortissimo, Forte, Mezzoforte, Piano, Tutti I, Tutti II, Tutti III, Tutti IV, Tutti V, Tutti P, Forte I, Forte II, Forte III, Forte V, Forte P, Mezzoforte I, Mezzoforte II, Mezzoforte III, Mezzoforte IV, Mezzoforte V, Mezzoforte P, Piano I, Piano II, Piano III, Piano V, Piano P, Pianissimo P, Tuttikoppel, Generalkoppel, Flöten I, Flöten II, Flöten III, Prinzipale I, Prinzipale II, Prinzipale III, Gamben I, Gamben II, Gamben III, Rohrwerk, Rohrwerk I, Rohrwerk II, Rohrwerk III, Rohrwerk IV, Rohrwerk V, Rohrwerk P, Ferpedal an, Handregister ab, Handregister I ab, Handregister II ab, Handregister III ab, Handregister IV ab, Handregister V ab, Handregister P ab, Handregister Fr. K. ab, Handregister Fr. K. I ab, Handregister Fr. K. II ab, Handregister Fr. K. III ab, Handregister Fr. K. IV ab, Handregister Fr. K. V ab, Handregister Fr. K. P ab, Walze (Crescendo) ab, Rohwerke ab, Rohwerke I ab, Rohwerke II ab, Rohwerke III ab, Rohwerke IV ab, Rohwerke V ab, Rohwerke P ab, 16' ab, 16' I ab, 16' II ab, 16' III ab, 16' IV ab, 16' V ab, HD ab, HD I ab, HD II ab, Pedalkoppeln ab, I ab, P ab, P I – IV ab, Automatische Pedal – umschaltung V, Schwelltritt II, Schwelltritt III, Schwelltritt IV, Schwelltritt V.

== Access ==
The hall lies east of the city centre, but can easily be reached by tram or bus.

The hall features a Visitor Centre open from Thursday to Sunday between 10 am and 6 pm for a small entrance fee.

The building and surroundings is frequently visited by tourists and locals. It lies close to other popular tourist attractions, such as the Wrocław Zoo, the Japanese Garden, and the Pergola with its Multimedia Fountain.

== See also ==
- List of indoor arenas in Poland
- Sport in Poland
- Monument to the Battle of the Nations

== Literature ==
- Erich A. Franz: Die Jahrhunderthalle. In: Bei uns in Breslau. Dülmen 1983, ISBN 3-87466-055-9, S. 32.
- Jerzy Ilkosz, Beate Störtkuhl (Hrsg.): Hans Poelzig in Breslau. Architektur und Kunst 1900–1916. Aschenbeck, Delmenhorst 2000.
- Jerzy Ilkosz: Die Jahrhunderthalle und das Ausstellungsgelände in Breslau. Das Werk Max Bergs. München 2006, ISBN 978-3-486-57986-4.
- Ernest Niemczyk: Hala Ludowa we Wrocławiu. Wydawn. Politechniki Wrocławskiej, Wrocław 1997, ISBN 83-7085-265-3. (mit deutschsprachiger Zusammenfassung)
- Helmut Sauer: Die Jahrhunderthalle zu Breslau. Historische Reminiszenzen. (hrsg. von der Vereinigung ehemaliger Angehöriger der Gerhart-Hauptmann-Oberrealschule zu Breslau) (= Die Grüne Reihe, Heft 16.) Selbstverlag A. Zappel, Leverkusen 2000.
- Gerhard Scheuermann: Das Breslau-Lexikon, Band 1. Laumann-Verlag, Dülmen 1994, ISBN 3-87466-157-1, S. 667–669.
- Günther Trauer, Willy Gehler: Die Jahrhunderthalle in Breslau. Berechnung, Konstruktion und Bauausführung. Sonderdruck aus Armierter Beton, Jahrgänge 1913 und 1914.
- Ferdinand Werner: Der lange Weg zum neuen Bauen. Band 1: Beton: 43 Männer erfinden die Zukunft. Wernersche Verlagsgesellschaft, Worms 2016. ISBN 978-3-88462-372-5, S. 334–340.

Preceded by Belgrade Fair; Belgrade	Eurobasket; Final Venue; 1963	Succeeded by Palace of Sports of the Central Lenin Stadium; Moscow
