= Max Berg =

German architect and urbanist

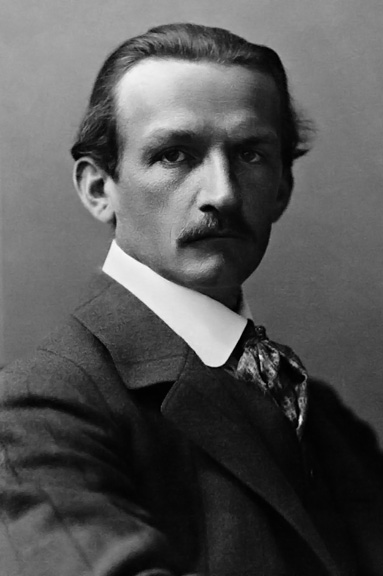
- Born: Max Paul Eduard Berg; 17 April 1870; Stettin, Prussia, North German Confederation
- Died: 22 January 1947 (aged 76); Baden-Baden, Allied-occupied Germany
- Occupation: Architect
- Buildings: Jahrhunderthalle

Max Berg (17 April 1870 – 22 January 1947) was a German architect and urban planner.

== Biography ==
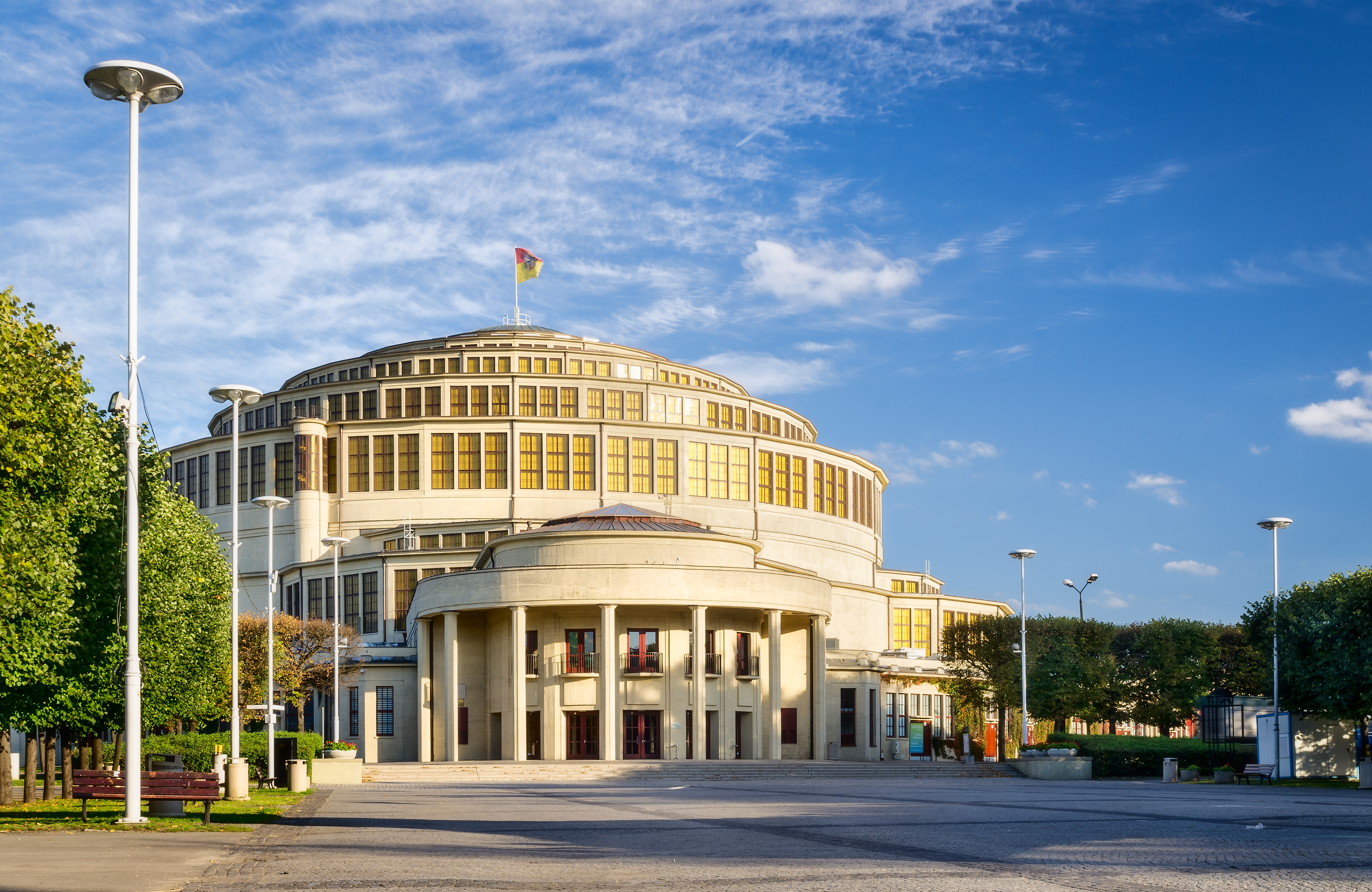
The Centennial Hall was constructed according to the plans of Max Berg in 1911–1913.

Berg was born in Stettin (now Szczecin, Poland) in the Kingdom of Prussia, North German Confederation. He attended the Technische Hochschule in Charlottenburg (today Technische Universität Berlin), where he was taught by Carl Schäfer who favoured Gothic architecture. Berg was also taught by Franz Adickes (1846–1915), an important urban planner.

In 1909 Berg was appointed senior building official in Breslau (now Wrocław, Poland), in Silesia. His most notable contribution to architecture is the Jahrhunderthalle (Centennial Hall) built between 1911 and 1913 as part of a series of works commemorating the 100th anniversary of the 1813 Battle of Leipzig against Napoleon Bonaparte. The Hall, an important early landmark of European reinforced concrete buildings, survived World War II, and in 2006 was designated a UNESCO World Heritage Site.

Other works in Breslau include the market hall (a huge concrete structure of elliptical arches, but appearing more traditional externally) and a large office building on the SW corner of the Main Market Square.

In 1925, the year he retired from his architectural career for Christian mysticism, Berg moved to Berlin and then to Baden-Baden, where he died in 1947, aged 76.

== Literature ==
- Iwona Bińkowska, Marzena Smolak, Nieznany portret miasta. Wrocław 1997.
- Jerzy Ilkosz, Beate Störtkuhl (eds.), Wieżowce Wrocławia 1919–1932. Wrocław 1997, ISBN 83-908067-0-3.
- Jerzy Ilkosz: Die Jahrhunderthalle und das Ausstellungsgelände in Breslau. Das Werk Max Bergs. München 2006, ISBN 3-486-57986-X.
- Otto Schubert, "Berg, Max Paul Eduard". In Neue Deutsche Biographie (NDB). vol. 2, Duncker & Humblot, Berlin 1955, ISBN 3-428-00183-4, S. 75 f. (Digitalisat).
- Eckhard Wendt: Stettiner Lebensbilder (= Veröffentlichungen der Historischen Kommission für Pommern. Reihe V, Band 40). Böhlau, Köln/Weimar/Wien 2004, ISBN 3-412-09404-8, S. 56–57.
