= Pergola =

Outdoor feature above a shaded walkway

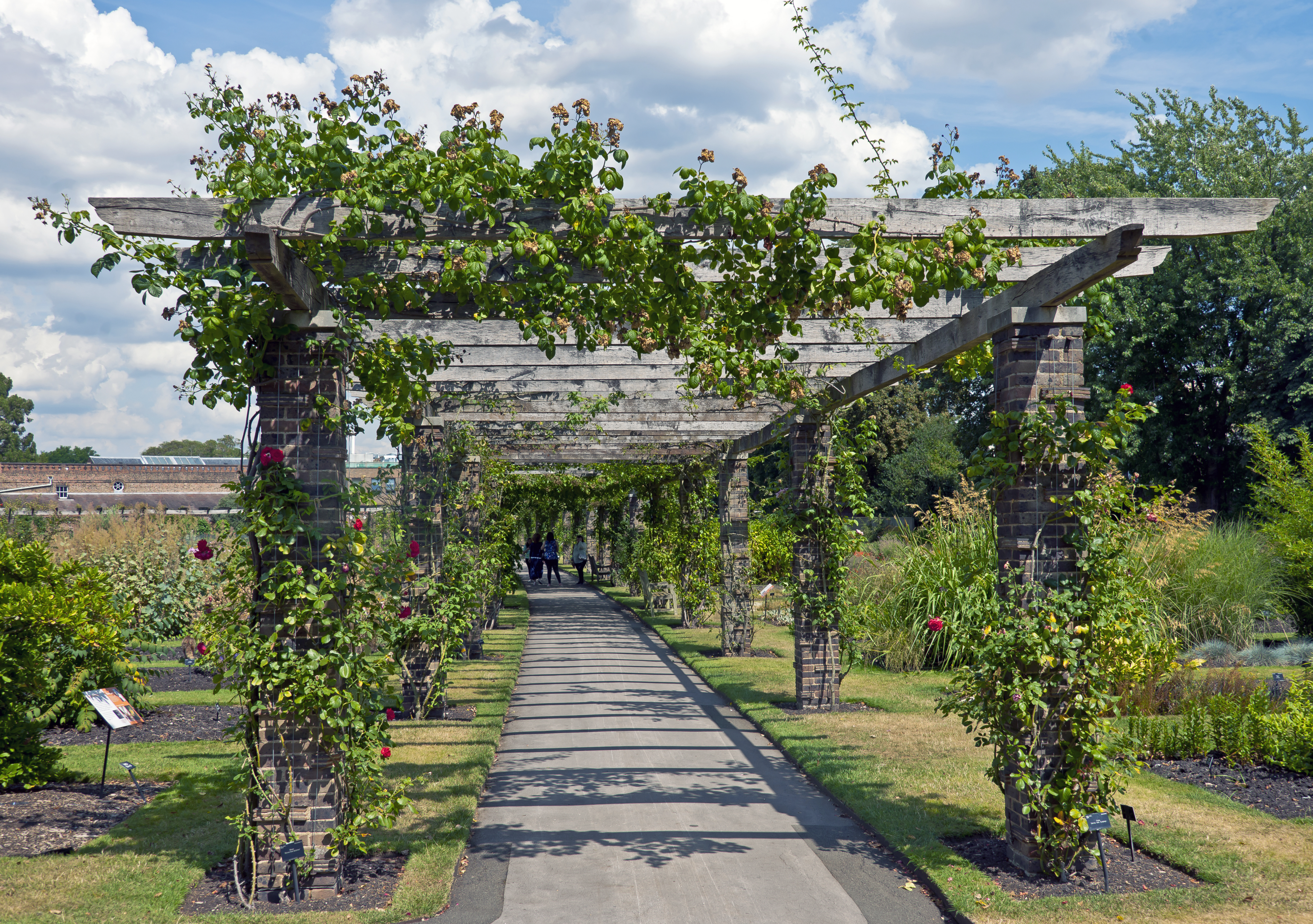
Rose Pergola at Kew Gardens, London

A pergola is most commonly used as an outdoor garden feature forming a shaded walkway, passageway, or sitting area of vertical posts or pillars that usually support crossbeams and a sturdy open lattice, often upon which woody vines are trained. The origin of the word is the Late Latin pergula, referring to a projecting eave.

It also may be an extension of a building or serve as protection for an open terrace or a link between pavilions. They are different from green tunnels, with a green tunnel being a type of road under a canopy of trees.

Depending on the context, the terms "pergola", "bower", and "arbor" are often used interchangeably. An "arbor" is also regarded as being a wooden bench seat with a roof, usually enclosed by lattice panels forming a framework for climbing plants. A pergola, on the other hand, is a much larger and more open structure. Normally, a pergola does not include integral seating.

Modern pergola structures can also include architectural or engineering structures having a pergola design, which are not used in gardens. California High-Speed Rail, for instance, uses large concrete pergolas to support high-speed rail guideways which cut over roadways or other rail tracks at shallow angles (unlike bridges or overcrossings which are usually nearly at right angles). (See the high-speed rail pergola structure picture elsewhere in the article for an illustration.)

== Description ==
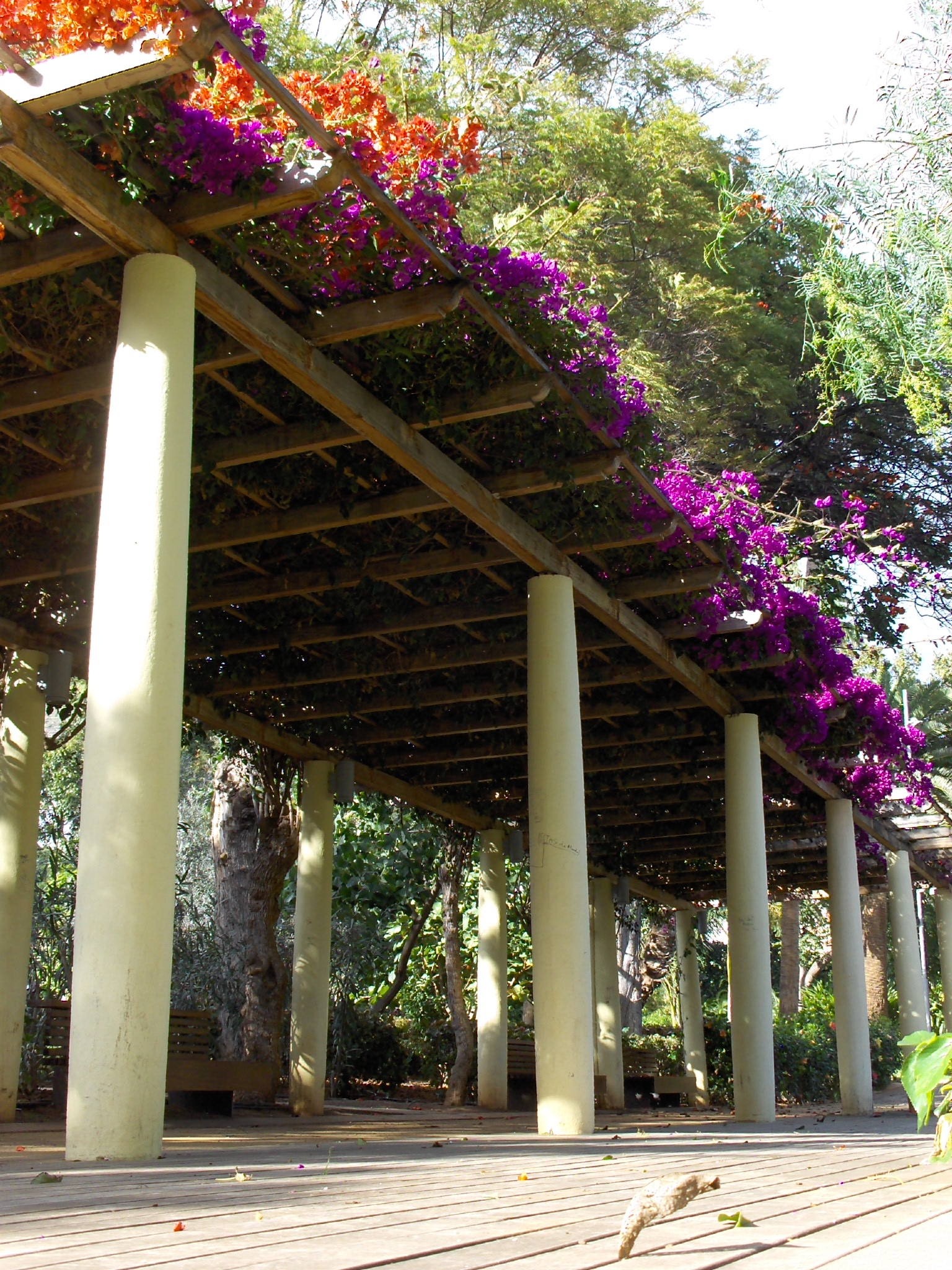
Pergola covered in bougainvillea

=== Features and types ===
Pergolas may link pavilions or extend from a building's door to an open garden feature such as an isolated terrace or pool. Freestanding pergolas, those not attached to a home or other structure, provide a sitting area that allows for breeze and light sun, but offer protection from the harsh glare of direct sunlight.

Pergolas also give climbing plants a structure on which to grow.

In 1498, Leonardo da Vinci decorated the Sala delle Asse of the Castello Sforzesco in Milan to give the illusion of the great square and vaulted reception hall being within a pergola that was made up of the intertwined branches of sixteen huge mulberry trees. The novel project was commissioned by the Duke of Milan, Ludovico Sforza.

=== Green tunnels ===
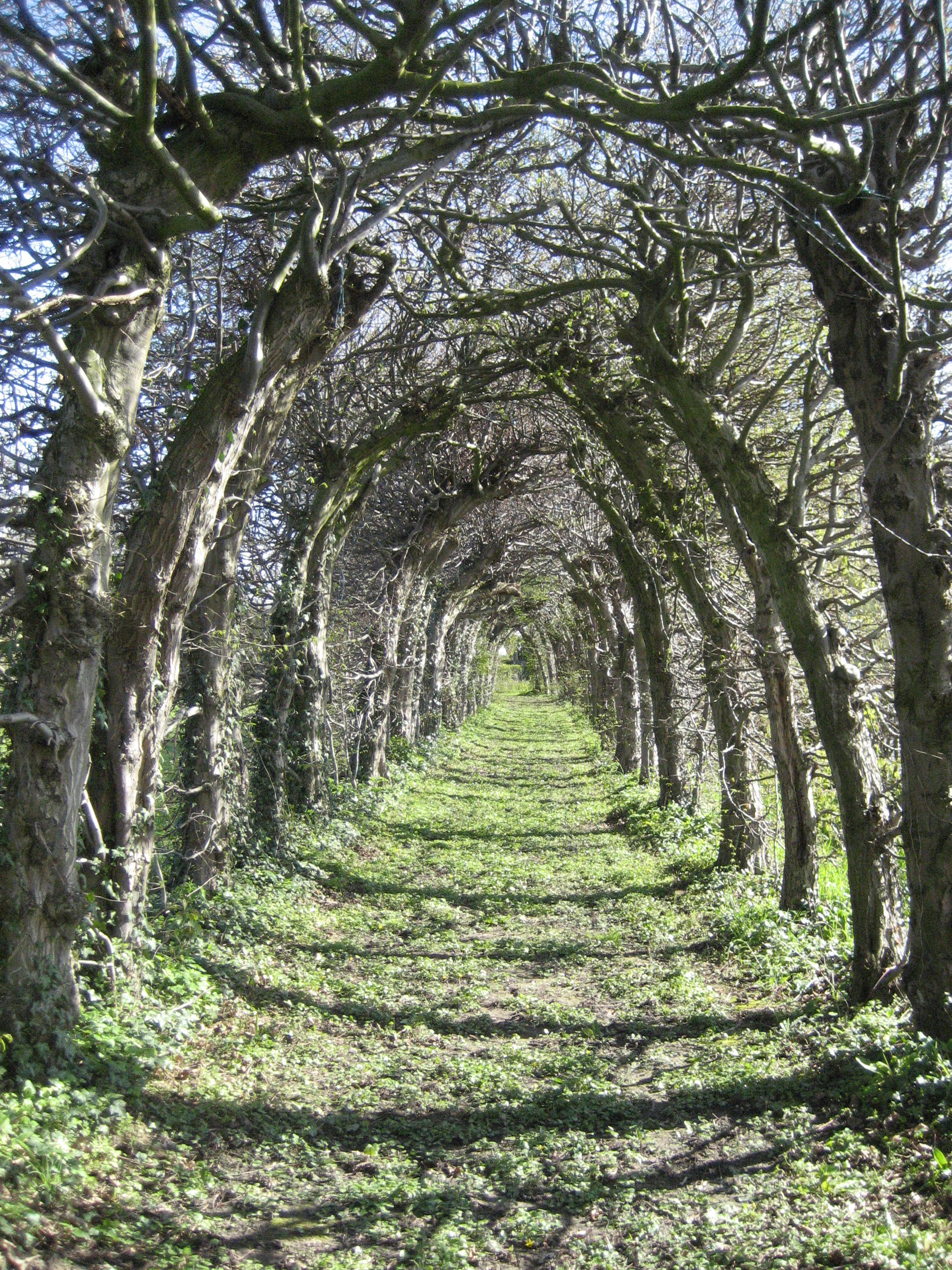
La fr:Charmille de fr:Pitet à fr:Fallais : The hornbeams of the 180-meter-long (590 ft) Pitet bower from the nineteenth century are included in the fr:Braives classified property list, province of Liège, Belgium (1942)

Pergolas are more permanent architectural features than the green tunnels of late medieval and early Renaissance gardens that often were formed of springy withies—easily replaced shoots of willow or hazel—bound together at the heads to form a series of arches, then loosely woven with long slats on which climbers were grown, to make a passage that was both cool, shaded, and moderately dry in a shower.

At the Medici villa, La Petraia, inner and outer curving segments of such green walks, the forerunners of pergolas, give structure to the pattern that can be viewed from the long terrace above it.

== History ==
=== Origin ===
The origin of the word is the Late Latin pergula, referring to a projecting eave. The English term was borrowed from Italian. The term was mentioned in an Italian context in 1645 by John Evelyn at the cloister of Trinità dei Monti in Rome He used the term in an English context in 1654 when, in the company of the fifth Earl of Pembroke, Evelyn watched the coursing of hares from a "pergola" built on the downs near Salisbury for that purpose.

=== Historical gardens ===
The clearly artificial nature of the pergola made it fall from favor in the naturalistic gardening styles of the eighteenth and nineteenth centuries. Yet handsome pergolas on brick and stone pillars with powerful cross-beams were a feature of the gardens designed in the late nineteenth and early twentieth centuries by Sir Edwin Lutyens and Gertrude Jekyll and epitomize their trademark of firm structure luxuriantly planted. A particularly extensive pergola is featured at the gardens of The Hill in Hampstead (London), designed by Thomas Mawson for his client W. H. Lever. Pergola in Wrocław was designed in 1911 and became a UNESCO World Heritage Site in 2006.

=== Modern pergolas ===
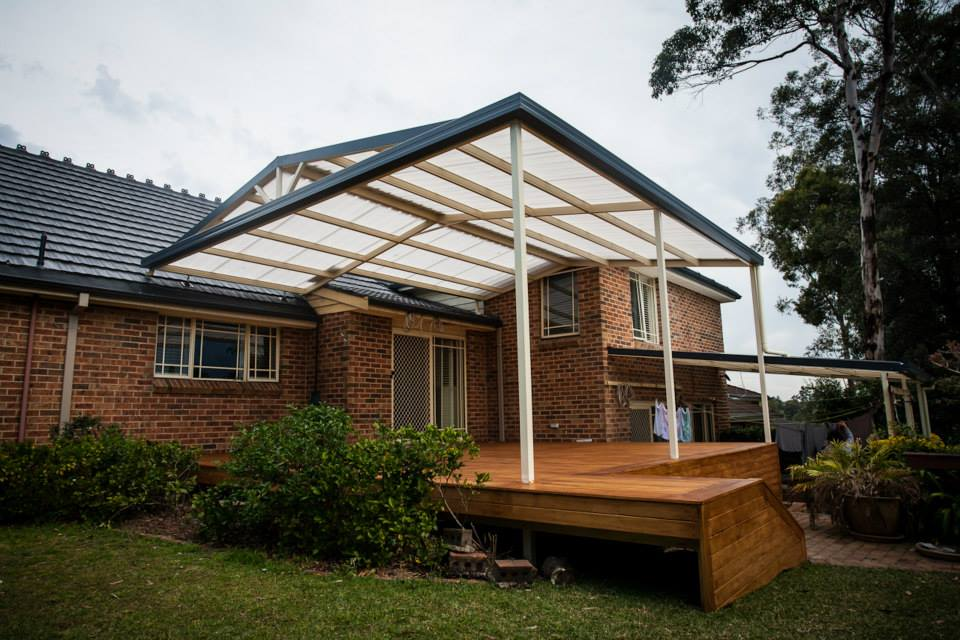
Typical Australian steel-framed pergola

Modern pergola design materials including wood, vinyl, fiberglass, aluminum, and chlorinated polyvinyl chloride (CPVC) rather than brick or stone pillars, are more affordable and are increasing in popularity. Wooden pergolas are made either from a weather-resistant wood, such as western red cedar (Thuja plicata) or, formerly, of coast redwood (Sequoia sempervirens). They are painted, stained, or use wood treated with preservatives for outdoor use. For a low-maintenance alternative to wood, the contemporary materials of vinyl, fiberglass, aluminum, and CPVC can be used. These materials do not require yearly paint or stain like a wooden pergola would, and their manufacture can make them even stronger and longer-lasting than a wooden pergola. These contemporary material pergolas can also be motorized to open and close.

== Gallery ==
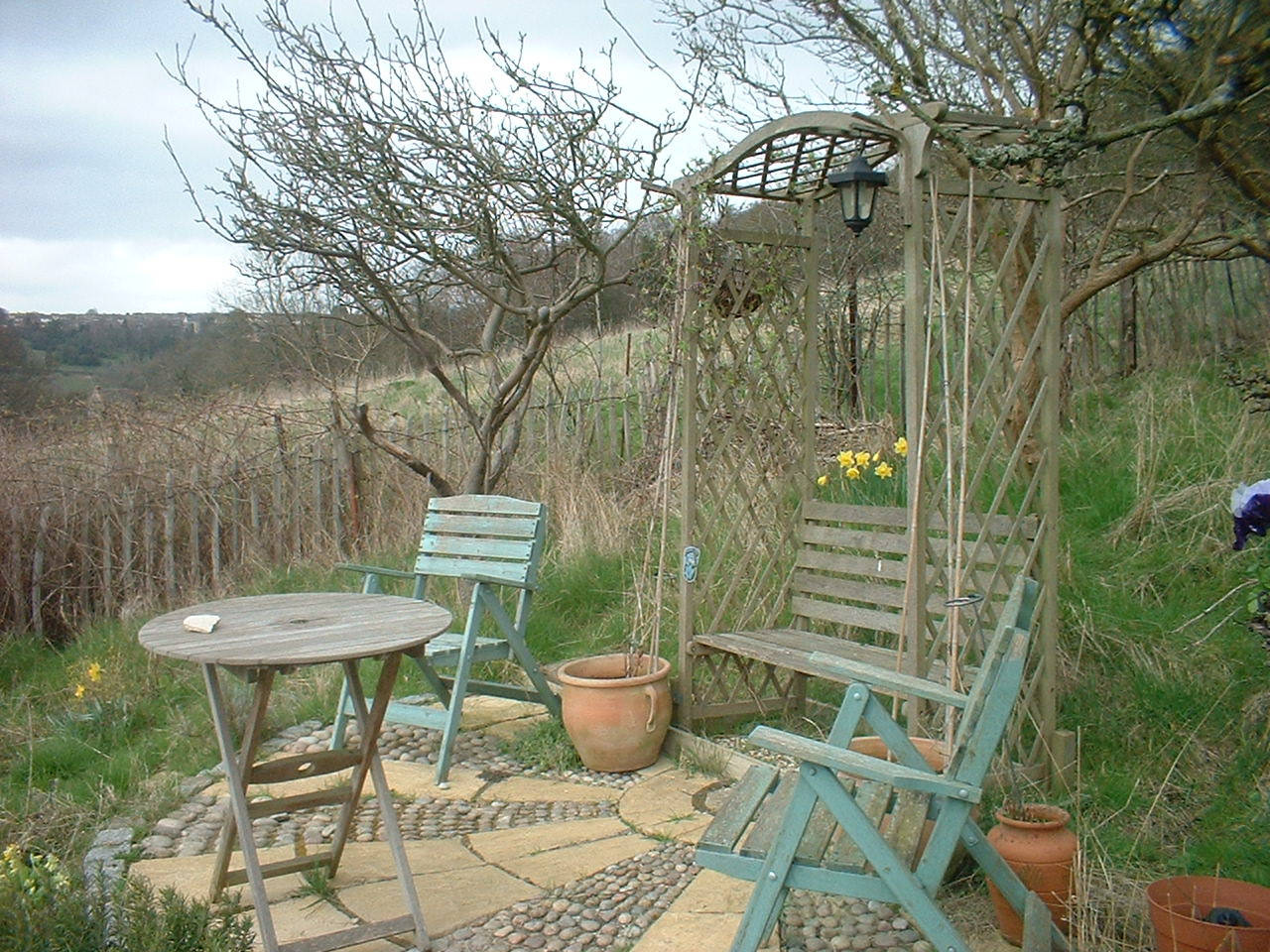
Pergola-type arbor

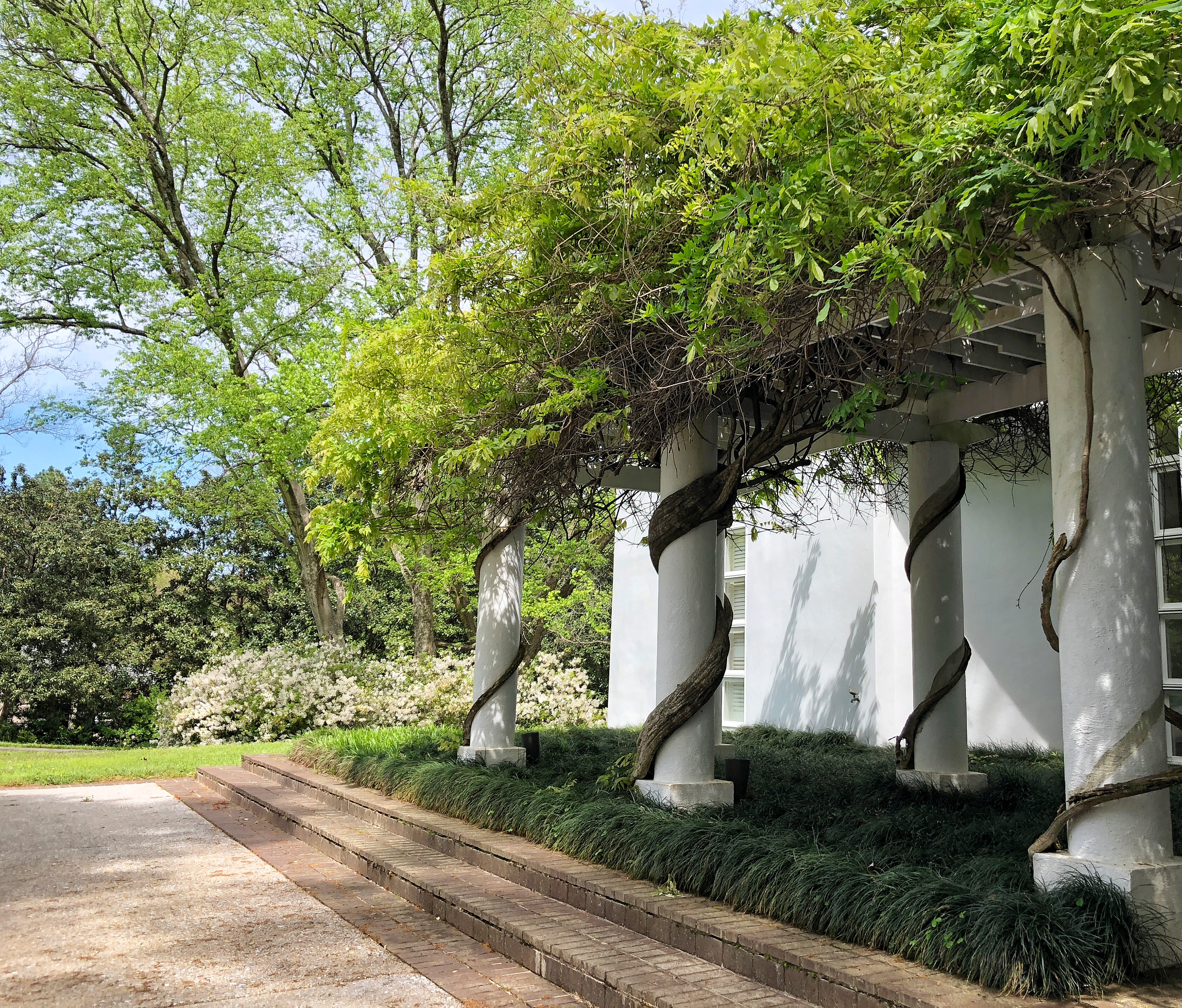
A pergola covered by wisteria at a private home in Alabama

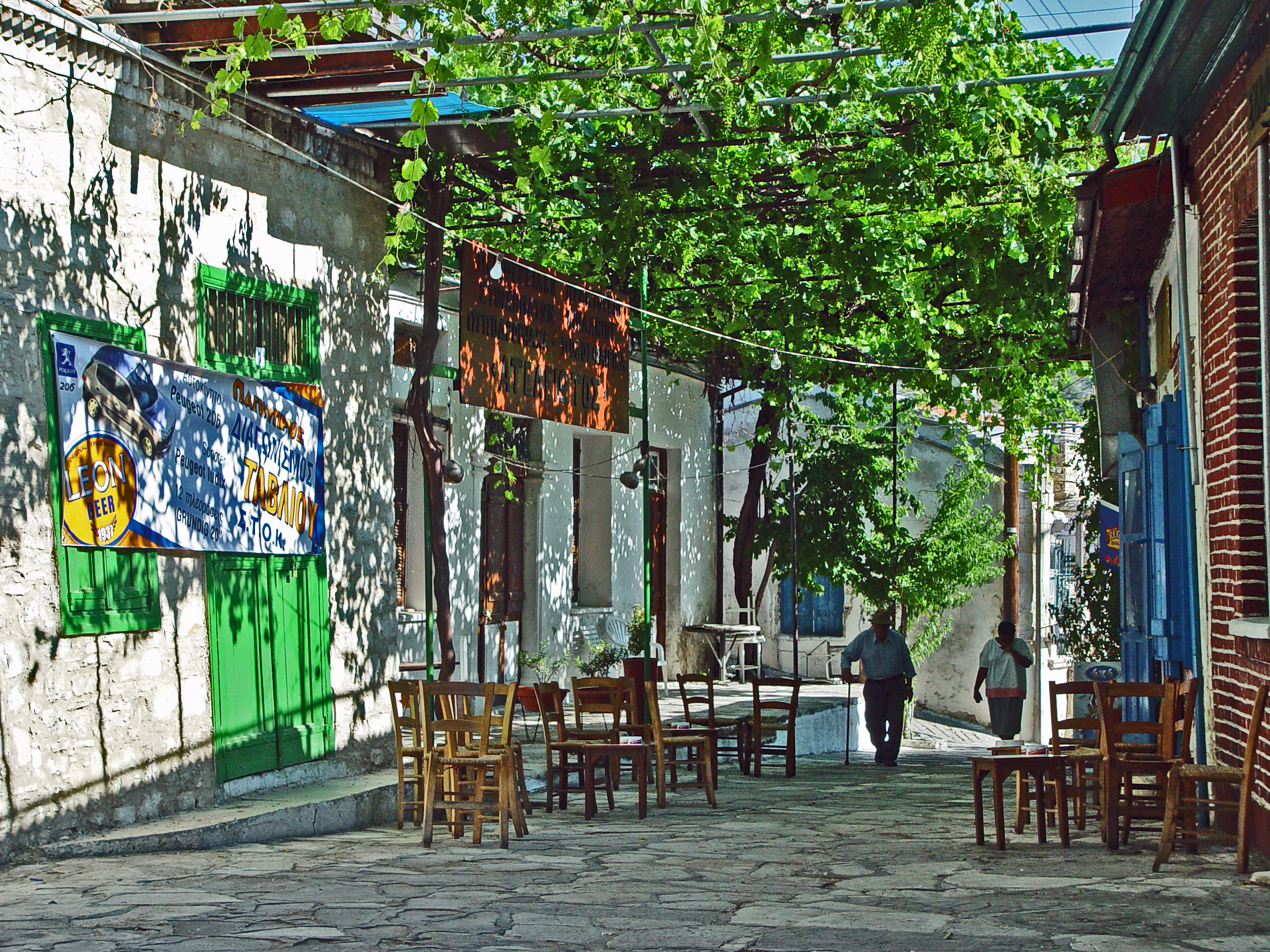
Alley with grapevine-covered pergola, Koilani, Cyprus

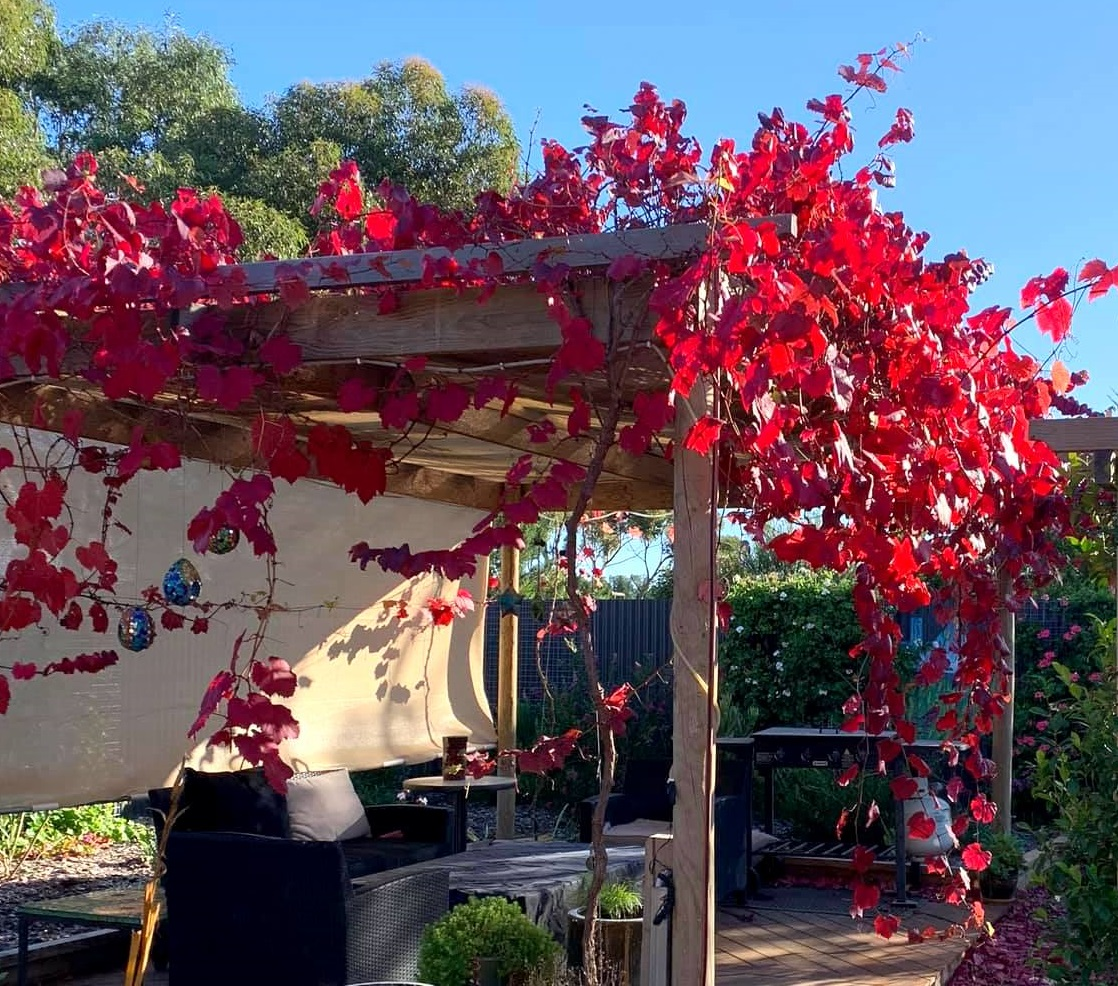
Pergola covered in ornamental grapevine

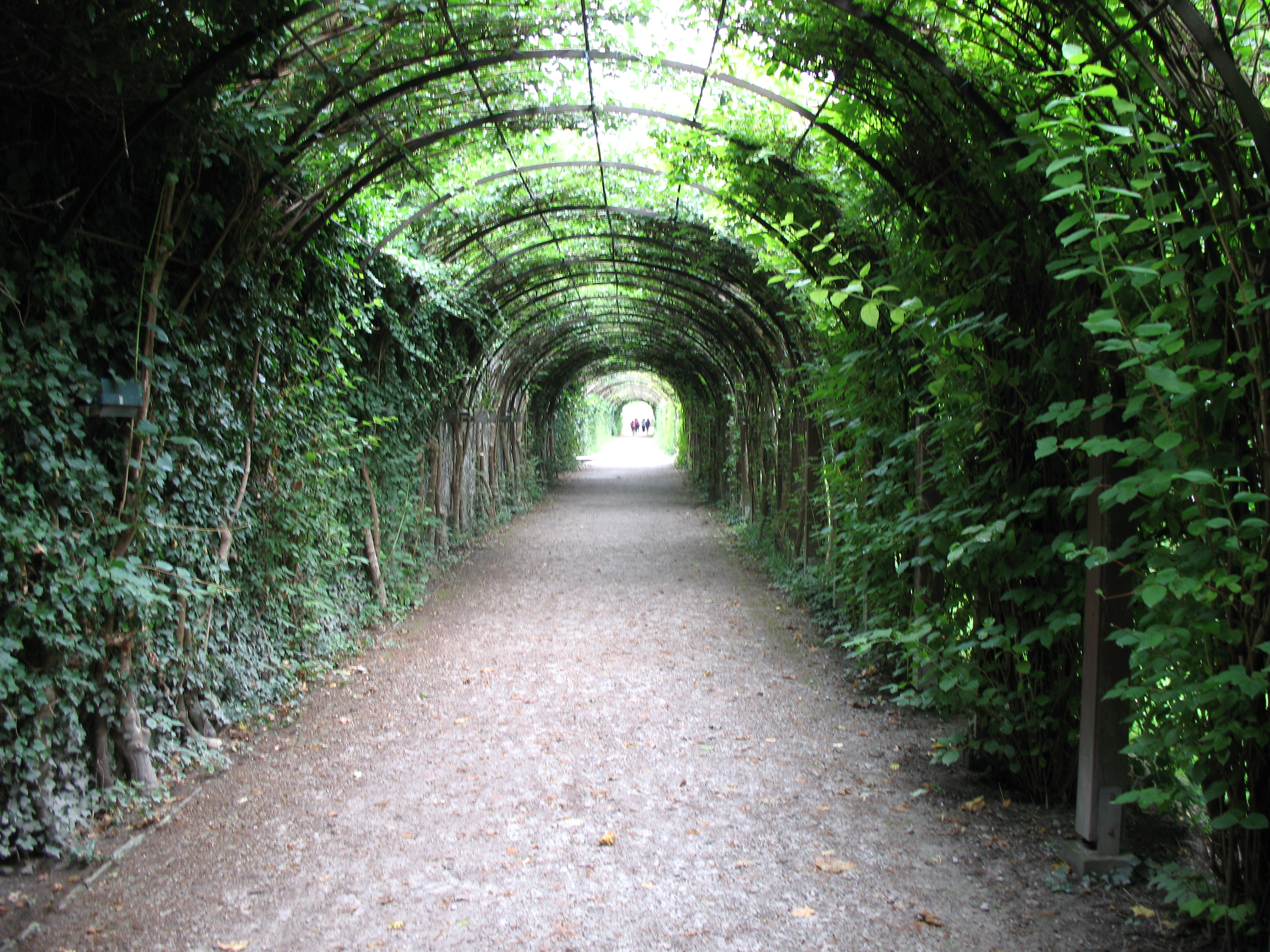
A green tunnel trained on modern materials, Mirabellgarten, Salzburg

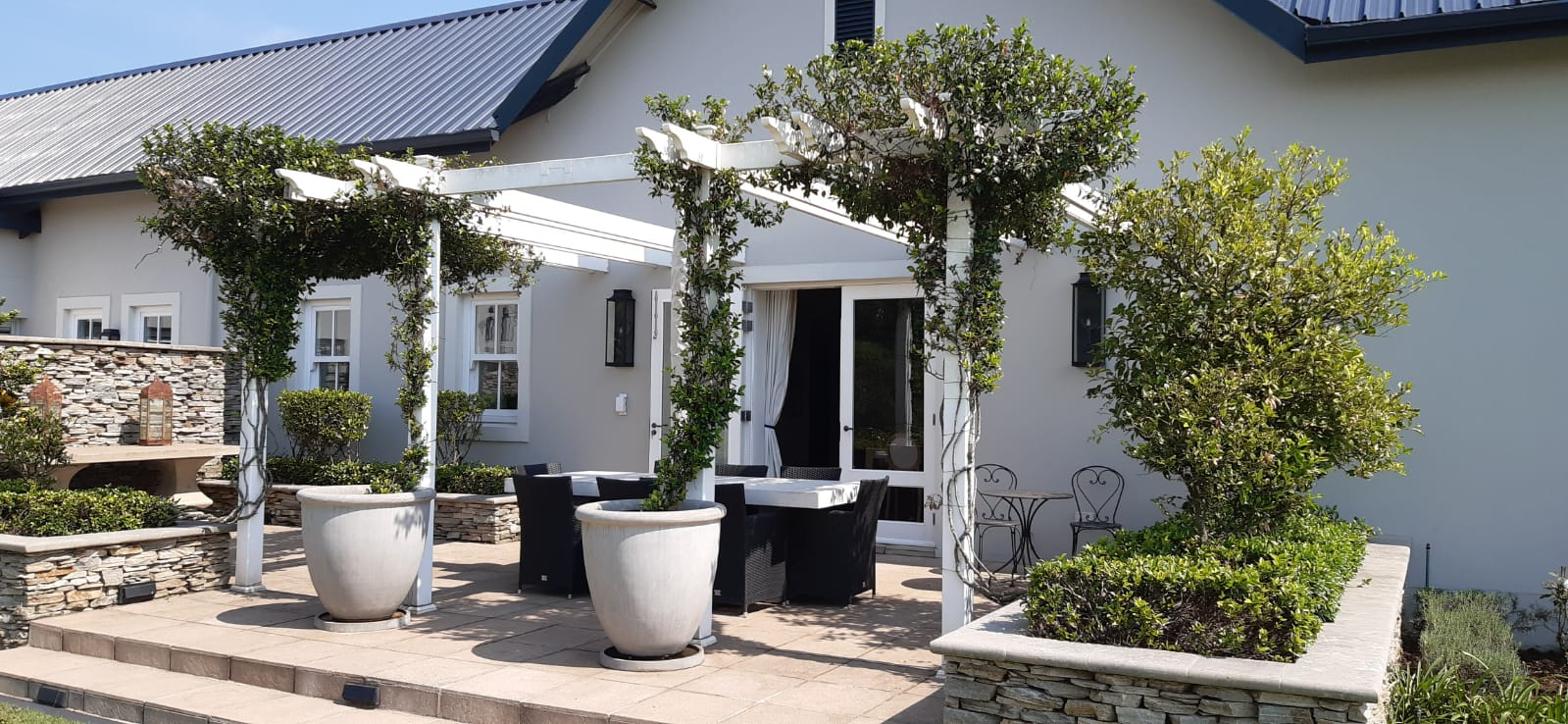
Pergola with creepers

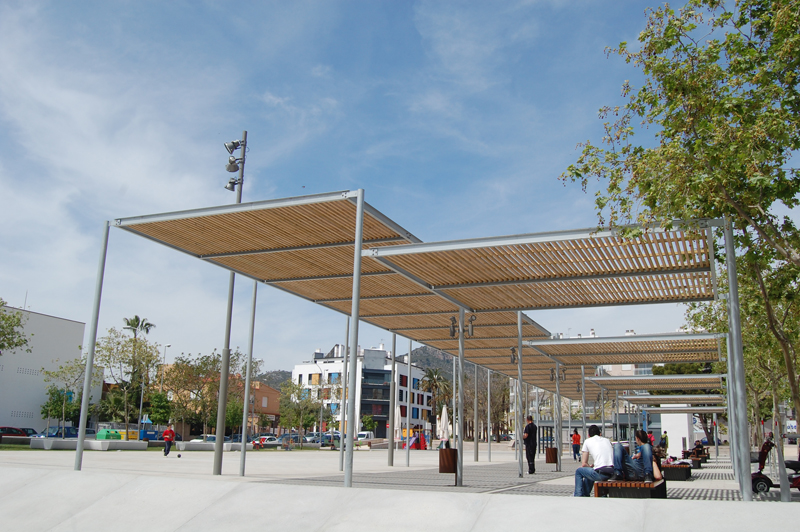
Contemporary pergola in a square in Benicassim, Spain

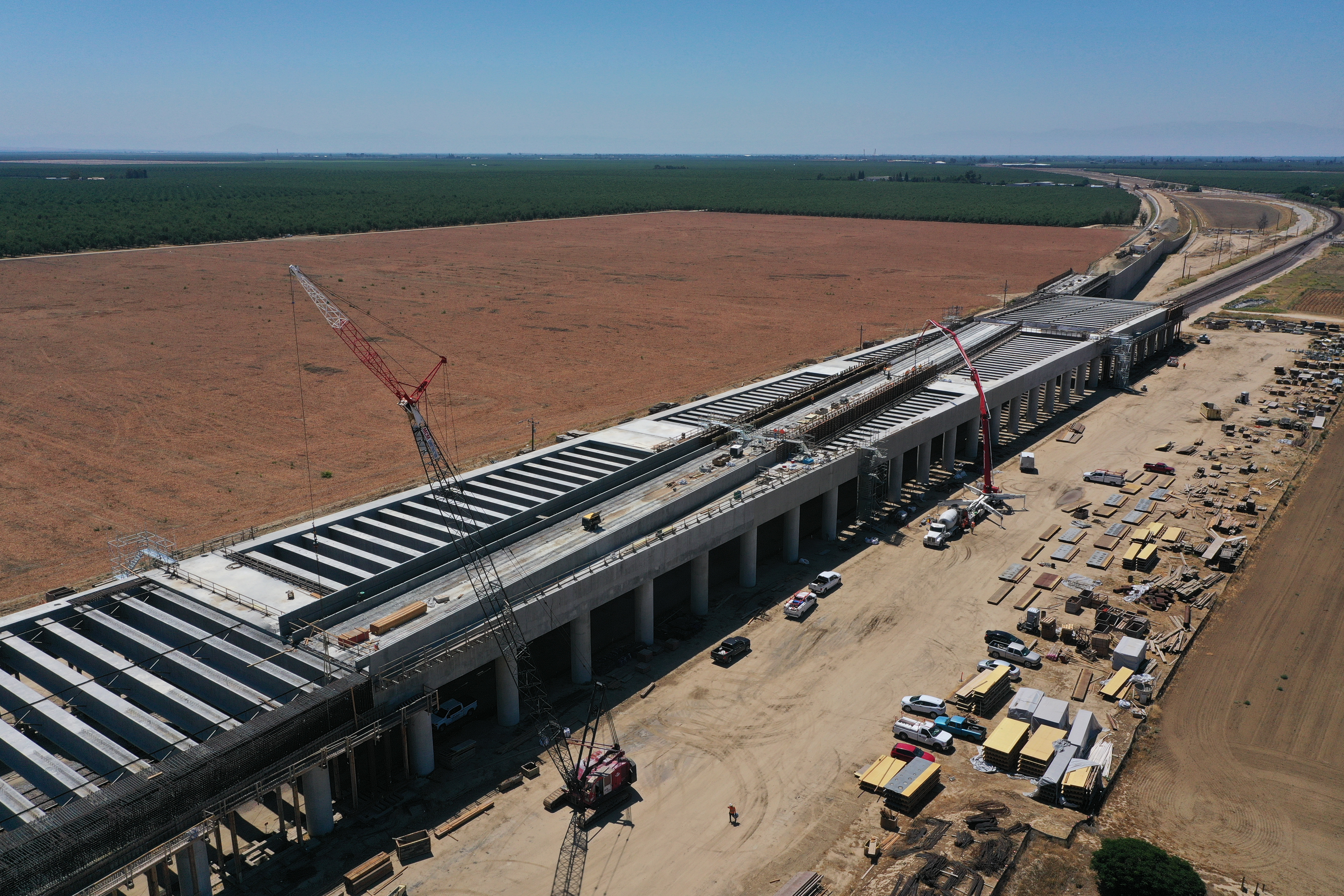
Pergola being built to carry California High-Speed Rail tracks over existing rail tracks near Wasco, California

== See also ==
- Breezeway
- Brise soleil
- Latticework
- Patio
- Trellis (architecture)
- Vine training systems
