= Archery at the 2017 World Games =

- The pictogram of Archery.
- Venue: Pergola Centennial Hall
- Dates: 23–30 July 2017
- Competitors: 96 from 34 nations

The archery tournaments at the 2017 World Games in Wrocław was played between 22 and 30 July. 96 archery competitors, from 34 nations, participated in the tournament. The archery competition took place at Pergola Centennial Hall in Lower Silesian Voivodeship. It served as a qualifying event for the 2020 Summer Olympics in Tokyo, Japan.

== Qualification ==
=== Timeline ===
Event	Date	Venue
2016 African Archery Championships	January 28–31, 2016	(Namibia) Windhoek
2016 Oceanian Archery Championships	April 8–16, 2016	(Tonga) Nuku'alofa
2016 European Archery Championships	May 23–29, 2016	(United Kingdom) Nottingham
2016 Pan American Archery Championships	May 24–29, 2016	(Costa Rica) San José
2016 World Field Championships	September 27–October 2, 2016	(Republic of Ireland) Dublin
2016 World ranking	December 31, 2016	(Switzerland) Lausanne
2017 Asia World Ranking Tournament	January 2017	(India) New Delhi

== Schedule ==
- All time are Central European Summer Time (UTC+02:00)

Date	Start	Event	Phase
Sunday 23 July 2017	9:00	Men's recurve	Qualification
Sunday 23 July 2017	9:00	Women's recurve	Qualification
Monday 24 July 2017	9:00	Men's recurve	Elimination
Monday 24 July 2017	9:00	Men's recurve	Elimination
Tuesday 25 July 2017	14:00	Men's recurve	Semi finals/Medal round
Tuesday 25 July 2017	14:00	Women's recurve	Semi finals/Medal round
Wednesday 26 July 2017	9:00	Men's barebow	Qualification
Wednesday 26 July 2017	9:00	Women's barebow	Qualification
Thursday 27 July 2017	9:00	Men's barebow	Elimination
Thursday 27 July 2017	9:00	Men's barebow	Elimination
Friday 28 July 2017	14:00	Men's barebow	Semi finals/Medal round
Friday 28 July 2017	14:00	Women's barebow	Semi finals/Medal round
Saturday 29 July 2017	9:30	Men's compound	Qualification/Round of 32/Round of 16/Quarter finals
Saturday 29 July 2017	9:30	Men's compound	Qualification/Round of 32/Round of 16/Quarter finals
Saturday 29 July 2017	9:30	Mixed compound	Quarter finals
Sunday 30 July 2017	10:00	Men's compound	Semi finals/Medal round
Sunday 30 July 2017	10:00	Women's compound	Semi finals/Medal round
Sunday 30 July 2017	10:00	Mixed compound	Semi finals/Medal round

== Participating nations ==
Poland, as the host country, receives a guaranteed spot, in case it were not to earn one by the regular qualifying methods.

- Australia (5)
- Austria (2)
- Belgium (2)
- Chinese Taipei (1)
- Colombia (2)
- Croatia (3)
- Czech Republic (2)
- Denmark (3)
- Egypt (1)
- El Salvador (1)
- Finland (3)
- France (7)
- Germany (3)
- Great Britain (4)
- Hungary (2)
- India (1)
- Iran (2)
- Italy (5)
- Japan (2)
- Malaysia (2)
- Mexico (3)
- Namibia (2)
- Netherlands (3)
- Philippines (1)
- Poland (7)
- Puerto Rico (1)
- Russia (2)
- Serbia (1)
- Slovenia (3)
- South Africa (2)
- South Korea (1)
- Spain (3)
- Sweden (5)
- United States (9)

== Medal table ==
Rank	Nation	Gold	Silver	Bronze	Total
1	Italy	2	0	1	3
2	Denmark	2	0	0	2
3	Colombia	1	0	0	1
3	Germany	1	0	0	1
3	Hungary	1	0	0	1
6	United States	0	2	2	4
7	Sweden	0	1	1	2
8	Great Britain	0	1	0	1
8	Iran	0	1	0	1
8	Mexico	0	1	0	1
8	Slovenia	0	1	0	1
12	Croatia	0	0	1	1
12	Czech Republic	0	0	1	1
12	Japan	0	0	1	1
Totals (14 entries)		7	7	7	21

== Medalists ==
=== Men ===
Event	Gold	Silver	Bronze
Compound	Stephan Hansen; Denmark	Esmaeil Ebadi; Iran	Domagoj Buden; Croatia
Barebow	István Kakas; Hungary	John Demmer III; United States	Martin Ottosson; Sweden
Recurve	Amedeo Tonelli; Italy	Brady Ellison; United States	Wataru Oonuki; Japan

=== Women ===
Event	Gold	Silver	Bronze
Compound	Sara López; Colombia	Toja Ellison; Slovenia	Christie Colin; United States
Barebow	Cinzia Noziglia; Italy	Lina Björklund; Sweden	Martina Macková; Czech Republic
Recurve	Lisa Unruh; Germany	Naomi Folkard; Great Britain	Jessica Tomasi; Italy

=== Mixed ===
Event	Gold	Silver	Bronze
Compound team	Denmark; Stephan Hansen; Sarah Sönnichsen	Mexico; Rodolfo González; Linda Ochoa-Anderson	United States; Cassidy Cox; Kris Schaff

== See also ==
- Archery at the 2016 Summer Olympics
