= Air sports at the 2017 World Games =

- The pictogram of Air sports.
- Venue: Szymanów Airport
- Dates: 21–23 July 2017
- Competitors: 64 from 22 nations

The air sports tournaments at the 2017 World Games in Wrocław was played between 21 and 23 July. 64 acrobatic gymnastics competitors, from 22 nations, participated in the tournament. The air sports competition took place at Szymanów Airport in Szymanów.

== Schedule ==
Q	Qualification	F	Final

Szymanów Airport
Event↓/Date →	Fri 21	Sat 22	Sun 23
Glider aerobatics	Q	F	
Parachuting canopy piloting	Q		F
Paramotor slalom	Q		F

== Participating nations ==
Poland, as the host country, receives a guaranteed spot, in case it were not to earn one by the regular qualifying methods.

- Australia (3)
- Austria (2)
- Brazil (1)
- Canada (1)
- Czech Republic (5)
- Denmark (1)
- France (7)
- Germany (4)
- Great Britain (1)
- Hungary (2)
- Italy (3)
- New Zealand (1)
- Norway (2)
- Poland (6)
- Russia (4)
- Spain (3)
- South Africa (1)
- Sweden (1)
- Thailand (4)
- Ukraine (1)
- United Arab Emirates (2)
- United States (9)

== Medal table ==
Rank	Nation	Gold	Silver	Bronze	Total
1	United States	1	1	0	2
2	Poland	1	0	1	2
3	Hungary	1	0	0	1
4	Italy	0	1	0	1
4	Thailand	0	1	0	1
6	Germany	0	0	1	1
6	United Arab Emirates	0	0	1	1
Totals (7 entries)		3	3	3	9

== Medalists ==
Event	Gold	Silver	Bronze
Glider aerobatics	Ferenc Tóth; Hungary	Luca Bertossio; Italy	Eugen Schaal; Germany
Parachuting	Nicolas Batsch; United States	Curtis Bartholomew; United States	Cornelia Mihai; United Arab Emirates
Paramotor	Wojciech Bógdał; Poland	Kittiphob Phrommat; Thailand	Marcin Bernat; Poland

== See also ==
- Air sports at the 2014 Asian Beach Games
