= United States at the 2017 World Games =

- IOC code: USA
- NOC: United States Olympic Committee
- Website: https://theworldgames2017.com/en/

in Wrocław, Poland 20 – 30 July 2017
- Competitors: 74 in 16 sports
- Medals Ranked 10th: Gold 7 Silver 10 Bronze 5 Total 22

World Games appearances
- 1981; 1985; 1989; 1993; 1997; 2001; 2005; 2009; 2013; 2017; 2022; 2025

The United States competed at the 2017 World Games in Wrocław, Poland, from 20 to 30 July 2017. The U.S. received 22 medals in 19 different events.

== Medalists ==
The following competitors won medals at the Games for the United States:

Medal	Name	Sport	Event	Date
Gold	Kelly Kulick	Bowling	Women's singles	21 July
Gold	Nicolas Batsch	Air sports	Parachuting canopy piloting	23 July
Gold	Georgia Bosscher; Claire Desmond; Carolyn Finney; Dylan Freechild; Sarah Griffith; Lien Hoffmann; Sandy Jorgensen; Beau Kittredge; Chris Kocher; Grant Lindsley; Jimmy Mickle; Anna Nazarov; Nick Stuart; George Stubbs (ultimate player)	Flying disc	Ultimate mixed team	23 July
Gold	Bonica Lough	Powerlifting	Women's super heavyweight	26 July
Gold	Paige Howard	Trampoline gymnastics	Women's double mini-trampoline	26 July
Gold	Nicola Butler	Water skiing	Women's wakeboard	27 July
Gold	United States women's national lacrosse team: Becca Block; Ally Carey; Kristen Carr; Taylor Cummings; Megan Douty; Brooke Griffin; Gussie Johns; Marie McCool; Alice Mercer; Alyssa Murray; Kelly Rabil; Jen Russell; Katie Schwarzmann; Michelle Tumolo; Devon Wills	Lacrosse	Women's tournament	30 July
Silver	Trent Sabo	Sumo	Men's lightweight	22 July
Silver	Curtis Bartholomew	Air sports	Parachuting canopy piloting	23 July
Silver	Kelly Kulick; Danielle McEwan	Bowling	Women's doubles	23 July
Silver	Priscilla Ribic	Powerlifting	Women's heavyweight	25 July
Silver	Brady Ellison	Archery	Men's recurve individual	25 July
Silver	Alexander Renkert	Trampoline gymnastics	Men's double mini-trampoline	25 July
Silver	Joseph Cappellino	Powerlifting	Men's super heavyweight	26 July
Silver	Austin Nacey	Trampoline gymnastics	Men's tumbling	26 July
Silver	Erika Lang	Water skiing	Women's wakeboard	27 July
Silver	John Demmer	Archery	Men's barebow individual	28 July
Bronze	Charles Okpoko	Powerlifting	Men's lightweight	24 July
Bronze	Liane Blyn	Powerlifting	Women's super heavyweight	26 July
Bronze	Janet Todd	Muay Thai	Women's 51 kg	30 July
Bronze	Kris Schaff; Cassidy Cox	Archery	Mixed compound team	30 July
Bronze	Christie Colin	Archery	Women's compound individual	30 July

== Competitors ==
Sports	Men	Women	Total	Events
Lacrosse	0	15	15	1
Rhythmic gymnastics	0	1	1	1
Trampoline	4	4	8	6
American football	36	0	36	1
Indoor rowing	1	1	2	2
Flying disc	7	7	14	1
Total	57	31	88	12

== Air sports ==
Glider

Athlete	Event	Round 1		Round 2		Round 3		Round 4		Total	
Athlete	Event	Points	Rank	Points	Rank	Points	Rank	Points	Rank	Points	Rank
Eric Lentz-Gauthier	Aerobatics	2202.20	7	1780.70	5	1521.20	8	3144.00	10	8642.60	6

Parachute

Athlete	Event	Jump												Total	
Athlete	Event	1	2	3	4	5	6	7	8	9	10	11	12	Net points	Rank
Curtis Bartholomew	Canopy piloting	7	34	9	4	4	12	21	2	1	2	1	5	71	2nd place, silver medalist(s)
Jeannie Bartholomew	Canopy piloting	20	16	14	15	25	21	4	25	14	12	5	20	196	12
Nicolas Batsch	Canopy piloting	4	32	7	6	9	1	1	4	2	1	2	12	54	1st place, gold medalist(s)
Albert Berchtold	Canopy piloting	10	25	35	32	12	13	12	19	23	16	25	10	219	16
Ian Bobo	Canopy piloting	30	1	18	8	21	25	28	8	21	11	26	35	265	26
Paul Rodriguez	Canopy piloting	3	14	2	2	34	1	21	1	6	5	19	3	104	6
Matt Schull	Canopy piloting	14	22	4	34	16	13	19	28	31	18	14	8	203	15
Greg Windmiller	Canopy piloting	5	29	4	10	20	13	3	9	3	8	4	13	100	5

== American football ==
During the 2015 split between IFAF Paris and IFAF New York, in which IFAF Paris expelled USA Football in 2017. USA Football was replaced by the United States Federation of American Football in Paris, while New York retained USA Football as their active member. Since IFAF New York was recognized by the International Olympic Committee at the time, the United States Federation of American Football was permitted to organize the United States national American football team for the 2017 World Games.

Players, mainly professional Americans playing in Europe, were chosen for the team on May 31, 2017. Players were promised full funding from the United States Federation of American Football, however, the funding was withdrawn just days before the competition and players had to provide their own transportation to Wrocław. As a result, most of the team withdrew from the competition and were instead replaced by volunteers who were already in Europe at the time. Most of the team arrived the day before their opening match vs the Germany national American football team. The Americans lost to Germany 13–14, in which was the first loss ever for a United States national American football team in international competition.

Summary

Team	Event	Semifinal	Final / BM	
Team	Event	Opposition Result	Opposition Result	Rank
United States men	Men's tournament	Germany; L 13–14	Bronze medal game Poland; W 14–7	3rd place, bronze medalist(s)

Semifinal

Quarter	1	2	3	4	Total
United States	0	7	6	0	13
Germany	0	7	0	7	14

at Olympic Stadium, Wrocław

- Date: 22 July 2016
- Game time: 13:00
- Referee: Perez Canto Juan (FRA)
- Report

Bronze medal game

Quarter	1	2	3	4	Total
United States	0	7	0	7	14
Poland	0	0	7	0	7

at Olympic Stadium, Wrocław

- Date: 24 July 2016
- Game time: 13:00
- Referee: Doboczky Zoltan (GER)
- Report

== Archery ==
Compound

Athlete	Event	Ranking round		Round of 32	Round of 16	Quarterfinal	Semifinal	Final / BM	
Athlete	Event	Score	Seed	Opposition Result	Opposition Result	Opposition Result	Opposition Result	Opposition Result	Rank
Kris Schaff	Men's individual	708	4	Bye	Damsbo (DEN); L 145–145*	did not advance			
Reo Wilde	Men's individual	706	8	Bye	Gonzalez (MEX); W 148–146	Hansen (DEN); L 148–150	did not advance		
Christie Colin	Women's individual	687	15	Elgibily (EGY); W 143–140	Sonnichsen (DEN); W 145–144	Cox (USA); W 146–142	Ellison (SLO); L 135–140	Bronze medal final Savenkova (RUS); W 137–137*	3rd place, bronze medalist(s)
Cassidy Cox	Women's individual	696	7	Bye	Cojuangco (PHI); W 145–140	Colin (USA); L 142–146	did not advance		
Cassidy Cox; Kris Schaff	Mixed team	1404	4	—N/a		France (FRA); W 157–153	Denmark (DEN); L 147–153	Bronze medal final Colombia (COL); W 154–151	3rd place, bronze medalist(s)

Recurve/Barebow

Athlete	Event	Ranking round		Elimination round				Semifinal	Final / BM	
Athlete	Event	Score	Seed	Opposition Result	Opposition Result	Opposition Result	Opposition Result	Opposition Result	Opposition Result	Rank
John Demmer III	Men's barebow	339	6	Bye		Ahjokivi (FIN); W 81–75	Seimandi (ITA); W 79–76	Ottosson (SWE); W 52–45	Kakas (HUN); L 51–54	2nd place, silver medalist(s)
Brady Ellison	Men's recurve	395	1	Bye				Oonuki (JPN); W 65–55	Tonelli (ITA); L 58–61	2nd place, silver medalist(s)
Vic Wunderle	Men's recurve	355	5	Bye		Valladont (FRA); L 86–93	did not advance			
Jenifer Stoner	Women's barebow	292	8	Bye	Maruyama (JPN); W 74–59	Porte (FRA); L 67–79	did not advance			
Heather Koehl	Women's recurve	323	8	Bye	Vaneckova (CZE); L 74–85	did not advance				

== Gymnastics ==
=== Trampoline ===
Paige Howard won a gold medal in Double Mini Women.

== Indoor rowing ==
Athlete	Event	Time	Rank
Andrew Niels	Men's lightweight 2000 m	6:28.4	6
Morgan McGrath	Women's 500 m	1:34.5	5

== Karate ==
Thomas Scott competed in the men's kumite 75 kg event and Sakura Kokumai competed in the women's kata event.

Athlete	Event	Elimination round				Semifinal	Final / BM	
Athlete	Event	Opposition Result	Opposition Result	Opposition Result	Rank	Opposition Result	Opposition Result	Rank
Thomas Scott	Men's kumite 75 kg	Horuna (UKR); L 1–6	Ainazarov (KAZ); W 4–0	Boguszewski (POL); W 3–1	2 Q	Asiabari (IRI); L 0–9	Bronze medal final Veríssimo (BRA); L 0–2	4
Sakura Kokumai	Women's kata	Scordo (FRA); L 2–3	Chmielewska (POL); W 5–0	Anacan (NZL); W 5–0	2 Q	Shimizu (JPN); L 0–5	Bronze medal final Scordo (FRA); L 0–5	4

== Lacrosse ==
The U.S. won gold in women's lacrosse, beating Canada 11-8 in the final. 2017 was the first year that the World Games included any version of lacrosse.

== Muay Thai ==
Athlete	Event	Quarterfinal	Semifinal	Final / BM	
Athlete	Event	Opposition Result	Opposition Result	Opposition Result	Rank
Troy Jones	Men's 75 kg	Beausejour (FRA); W 28–29	Hurkou (BLR); L RSC	Bronze medal bout Grigorev (RUS); L WO	4
Janet Todd	Women's 51 kg	El Moubarik (MAR); W 29–28	Koson (THA); L 27–30	Bronze medal bout Kuzawińska (POL); W RSC	3rd place, bronze medalist(s)

== Powerlifting ==
Men

Athlete	Event	Squat		Bench press		Deadlift		Total		
Athlete	Event	Weight	Rank	Weight	Rank	Weight	Rank	Weight	Points	Rank
Charles Okpoko	Lightweight	312.5	1	200.0	=3	257.5	=5	770.0	608.99	3rd place, bronze medalist(s)
Paul Douglas	Middleweight	357.5	2	222.5	8	310.0	=4	890.0	595.05	6
Ian Bell	Heavyweight	357.5	7	230.0	10	371.0	2	958.5	603.18	5
Charles Conner	Heavyweight	382.5	=4	312.5	1	280.0	=10	975.0	586.37	9
Joseph Cappellino	Super heavyweight	440.0	2	350.0	2	355.0	6	1125.0	613.13	2nd place, silver medalist(s)
Blaine Sumner	Super heavyweight	475.0	1	405.0	1	NM		DSQ		

Women

Athlete	Event	Squat		Bench press		Deadlift		Total		
Athlete	Event	Weight	Rank	Weight	Rank	Weight	Rank	Weight	Points	Rank
Priscilla Ribic	Heavyweight	235.0	=4	160.0	2	240.0	2	635.0	632.08	2nd place, silver medalist(s)
Liane Blyn	Super heavyweight	242.5	8	182.5	3	217.5	=3	642.5	590.07	3rd place, bronze medalist(s)
Bonica Lough	Super heavyweight	310.5	1	205.0	1	247.5	1	763.0 WR	600.71	1st place, gold medalist(s)

== Sport climbing ==
Speed

Athlete	Event	Qualification				Quarterfinal	Semifinal	Final / BM	
Athlete	Event	Run 1	Run 2	Best	Rank	Opposition Result	Opposition Result	Opposition Result	Rank
John Brosler	Men's speed	7.72	6.10	6.10	8 Q	Boldyrev (UKR); L 6.58–6.10	did not advance		

Lead

Athlete	Event	Qualification		Final		
Athlete	Event	Hold	Rank	Hold	Time	Rank
Claire Buhrfiend	Women's lead	33+	=6 Q	29+	—	8
Margo Hayes	Women's lead	26+	9	did not advance		

== Flying disc ==
The U.S. defeated Colombia 13-7 in the final of Ultimate Mixed Flying Disc to earn the gold medal.

== Water skiing ==
Tricks

Athlete	Event	Qualification		Final	
Athlete	Event	Points	Rank	Points	Rank
Adam Pickos	Men's tricks	4190	10	did not advance	
Anna Gay	Women's tricks	9020	1 Q	7850	4

Slalom

Athlete	Event	Qualification			Final		
Athlete	Event	Passes	Rope length	Rank	Passes	Rope length	Rank
Samantha Dumala	Women's slalom	0.0	18.25	7 Q	4.0	12.00	5

Jump

Athlete	Event	Qualification		Final	
Athlete	Event	Distance	Rank	Distance	Rank
Brittany Greenwood	Women's jump	42.7	5 Q	40.0	6

Wakeboard

Athlete	Event	Heat		Repechage		Semifinal		Final	
Athlete	Event	Points	Rank	Points	Rank	Points	Rank	Points	Rank
Dan Powers	Men's wakeboard	46.56	1 Q	Bye		53.56	4	did not advance	
Nicola Butler	Women's wakeboard	45.56	3 R	53.78	1 Q	—N/a		66.78	1st place, gold medalist(s)
Erika Lang	Women's wakeboard	53.11	2 Q	Bye		—N/a		65.44	2nd place, silver medalist(s)
