= Air sports at the 2017 World Games – Parachuting canopy piloting =

Parachuting canopy piloting at the World Games
- Venue: Szymanów Airport, Szymanów, Poland
- Dates: 21–23 July 2017
- Competitors: 36 from 19 nations

Medalists
1st place, gold medalist(s)		Nicolas Batsch	United States
2nd place, silver medalist(s)		Curtis Bartholomew	United States
3rd place, bronze medalist(s)		Cornelia Mihai	United Arab Emirates

The parachuting canopy piloting tournaments at the 2017 World Games in Wrocław was played between 21 and 22 July. 11 Parachuting canopy piloting competitors, from 8 nations, participated in the tournament. The air sports competition took place at Szymanów Airport in Szymanów.

== Competition format ==
Final: The 36 parachuting canopy piloting competitors perform twelve rounds; the top three divers win the gold, silver and bronze medals accordingly.

== Schedule ==
- All times are Central European Summer Time (UTC+2)

Date	Time	Round
Friday, 21 July	11:00	Final round 01
Friday, 21 July	12:30	Final round 02
Friday, 21 July	16:00	Final round 03
Friday, 21 July	17:00	Final round 04
Saturday, 22 July	08:00	Final round 05
Saturday, 22 July	09:30	Final round 06
Saturday, 22 July	10:15	Final round 07
Saturday, 22 July	14:15	Final round 08
Sunday, 23 July	09:00	Final round 09
Sunday, 23 July	10:00	Final round 10
Sunday, 23 July	11:10	Final round 11
Sunday, 23 July	12:00	Final round 12

== Results ==
Rank	Athlete	Nation	R1	R2	R3	R4	R5	R6	R7	R8	R9	R10	R11	R12	Total
1st place, gold medalist(s)	United States	Nicolas Batsch	4	32	7	6	9	1	1	4	2	1	2	12	54
2nd place, silver medalist(s)	United States	Curtis Bartholomew	7	34	9	4	4	12	21	2	1	2	1	5	71
3rd place, bronze medalist(s)	United Arab Emirates	Cornelia Mihai	12	31	11	5	4	1	10	3	24	3	9	2	90
4	United Arab Emirates	Abdulbari Qubaisi	13	23	23	3	4	9	24	17	5	4	3	7	98
5	United States	Greg Windmiller	5	29	4	10	20	13	3	9	3	8	4	13	100
6	United States	Paul Rodriguez	3	14	2	2	34	1	21	1	6	5	19	3	104
7	France	Eric Philippe	18	7	20	34	2	1	24	7	17	7	6	6	156
8	Australia	Andrew Woolf	1	14	6	12	12	9	14	11	33	13	20	4	157
9	France	Cedric Veiga Rios	2	19	35	1	2	13	35	5	16	35	36	1	165
10	Australia	Keven Walters	8	35	17	28	10	13	17	12	30	33	7	11	180
11	Australia	Robert McMillan	11	6	19	30	4	13	35	22	4	30	29	18	185
12	United States	Jeannie Bartholomew	20	16	14	15	25	21	4	25	14	12	5	20	196
13	Russia	Sergey Romanyuk	6	33	1	17	18	30	24	20	9	25	9	26	199
14	Germany	Tobias Koch	23	27	30	11	16	13	34	30	12	22	16	9	202
15	United States	Matt Shull	14	22	4	34	16	13	19	28	31	18	14	8	203
16	United States	Albert Berchtold	10	25	35	32	12	13	12	19	23	16	25	10	219
17	Italy	Armando Fattoruso	17	11	3	13	19	27	20	6	28	20	34	15	227
18	New Zealand	Chris Stewart	9	11	16	21	4	28	21	26	8	32	35	16	227
19	Canada	Sven Jseppi	31	24	13	9	10	29	32	10	25	23	11	23	228
20	Denmark	Christian Weber	31	30	21	20	1	1	4	24	13	19	15	35	229
21	Germany	Markus Scheuermann	16	17	12	18	23	26	17	15	21	9	33	27	234
22	Italy	Mario Fattoruso	22	4	15	23	30	8	12	34	19	10	30	28	240
23	Brazil	Paulo Marques	15	5	28	24	21	33	4	18	11	6	22	14	246
24	Norway	Barton Adrian Hardie	19	1	22	14	26	1	30	34	34	26	21	17	259
25	Norway	Daniel Eriksen	21	1	27	34	12	9	15	32	18	15	17	29	259
26	United States	Ian Bobo	30	1	18	8	21	25	28	8	21	11	26	35	265
27	Czech Republic	Jiří Blaška	28	10	29	19	12	1	27	21	25	29	27	21	266
28	Russia	Yuri Garmashov	31	26	8	7	35	21	10	14	20	14	28	33	275
29	Czech Republic	Mark Rabhani	26	28	31	33	31	13	1	33	10	34	8	25	287
30	South Africa	Matteo Pagani	24	9	34	16	33	36	33	13	15	17	12	34	295
31	Ukraine	Andrii Stalnyi	31	18	10	27	27	21	4	27	29	28	24	30	300
32	Poland	Maciej Machowicz	25	21	26	26	23	34	4	34	32	21	23	22	302
33	Great Britain	Maxine Tate	31	20	25	25	29	24	15	31	7	24	31	24	304
34	Sweden	Stefan Burström	27	13	32	22	28	31	29	29	27	36	17	32	334
35	Austria	Paul Alexandrow	31	8	24	29	32	35	31	23	36	31	12	31	344
36	Poland	Maciej Michalak	29	36	33	31	35	32	4	16	35	27	32	19	355

== Medalists ==
Event	Gold	Silver	Bronze
Parachuting canopy piloting	United States; Nicolas Batsch	United States; Curtis Bartholomew	United Arab Emirates; Cornelia Mihai
