= Archery at the 2017 World Games – Men's individual barebow =

Men's individual barebow at the 2017 World Games
- Venue: Szczytnicki Park, Wrocław, Poland
- Dates: 26–28 July
- Competitors: 12 from 11 nations

Medalists
| gold medal | István Kakas | Hungary |
| silver medal | John Demmer | United States |
| bronze medal | Martin Ottosson | Sweden |

The men's individual barebow archery competition at the 2017 World Games took place from 26 to 28 July 2017 at the Szczytnicki Park in Wrocław, Poland.

== Competition format ==
A total of 12 archers entered the competition. After ranking round athletes who come first and second qualifies directly to semifinals. The rest of competitors is divided into two groups, where they compete against each other in the stepladder competition format. The winners of the two groups advances to the semifinals. In group matches athletes shoot 18 arrows, in semifinals and finals - 12 arrows.

== Results ==
=== Ranking round ===
| Rank | Archer | Nation | Score | 6s | 5s |
|---|---|---|---|---|---|
| 1 | David García | Spain | 348 | 20 | 22 |
| 2 | Martin Ottosson | Sweden | 357 | 23 | 26 |
| 3 | Giuseppe Seimandi | Italy | 341 | 18 | 19 |
| 4 | Erik Jonsson | Sweden | 340 | 15 | 28 |
| 5 | István Kakas | Hungary | 339 | 20 | 23 |
| 6 | John Demmer | United States | 339 | 18 | 23 |
| 7 | Pasi Ahjokivi | Finland | 330 | 15 | 20 |
| 8 | Károly Koroknay | Serbia | 318 | 17 | 19 |
| 9 | Mick Fisher | Australia | 315 | 13 | 20 |
| 10 | Olivier Roy | France | 314 | 10 | 19 |
| 11 | Gust Kerschbacher | Austria | 299 | 8 | 20 |
| 12 | Mateusz Siejko | Poland | 228 | 4 | 5 |

=== Competition bracket ===
==== Group A ====
Match 1; 24 July
10 | (France) Olivier Roy | 76
11 | (Austria) Gust Kerschbacher | 60

Match 2; 24 July
7 | (Finland) Pasi Ahjokivi | 69
10 | (France) Olivier Roy | 64

Match 3; 24 July
6 | (United States) John Demmer | 81
7 | (Finland) Pasi Ahjokivi | 75

Match 4; 24 July
3 | (Italy) Giuseppe Seimandi | 76
6 | (United States) John Demmer | 79

==== Group B ====
Match 1; 24 July
12 | (Poland) Mateusz Siejko | 28
9 | (Australia) Mick Fisher | 69

Match 2; 24 July
9 | (Australia) Mick Fisher | 77
8 | (Serbia) Károly Koroknay | 72

Match 3; 24 July
9 | (Australia) Mick Fisher | 75
5 | (Hungary) István Kakas | 83

Match 4; 24 July
5 | (Hungary) István Kakas | 83
4 | (Sweden) Erik Jonsson | 77

==== Finals ====
Semifinals
2 | (Sweden) Martin Ottosson | 45
6 | (United States) John Demmer | 52
5 | (Hungary) István Kakas | 46
1 | (Spain) David García | 43

Final
6 | (United States) John Demmer | 51
5 | (Hungary) István Kakas | 54
Third place
2 | (Sweden) Martin Ottosson | 53
1 | (Spain) David García | 51
