= Dancesport at the 2017 World Games – Salsa =

Salsa at the 2017 World Games
- Venue: Centennial Hall
- Date: 28 July 2017
- Competitors: 20 from 9 nations

Medalists
1st place, gold medalist(s)		Stevens Rebolledo; Yinessa Ortega	Colombia
2nd place, silver medalist(s)		Yefersson Benjumea; Adriana Avila	Colombia
3rd place, bronze medalist(s)		Simone Sanfilippo; Serena Maso	Italy

The salsa competition at the 2017 World Games took place on 28 July 2017 at the Centennial Hall in Wrocław, Poland.

== Competition format ==
A total of 10 pairs from 9 nations entered the competition. In first round best six pairs qualified directly to the semifinal. In the redance additional two pairs are advancing to the semifinal. From semifinal the best six pairs qualifies to the final.

== Results ==
=== First round ===
Rank	Athletes	Nation	Score	Note
	Yefersson Benjumea/Adriana Avila	Colombia	33.43	Q
	Simone Sanfilippo/Serena Maso	Italy	31.75	Q
	Stevens Rebolledo/Yinessa Ortega	Colombia	34.85	Q
	Jakub Mazuch/Tereza Vodičková	Czech Republic	32.00	Q
	Juan Alejandro Pallares/Magali Piedra	Spain	29.33	Q
	Jose Romero Martinez/Jessica Valencia Naveda	Ecuador	32.08	Q
	Robinson Ferreira Da Silva/Larissa dos Santos	Brazil	27.92	
	Mate Pek/Edit Lilla Nagy	Hungary	28.13	
	Jordan Muillerac/Laure Ibanez	France	29.17	
	Luis Santiago/Brianna Rios	United States	28.67	

=== Redance ===
Rank	Athletes	Nation	Score	Note
	Jordan Muillerac/Laure Ibanez	France	30.00	Q
	Mate Pek/Edit Lilla Nagy	Hungary	30.25	Q
9	Luis Santiago/Brianna Rios	United States	28.67	
10	Robinson Ferreira Da Silva/Larissa dos Santos	Brazil	28.67	

=== Semifinal ===
Rank	Athletes	Nation	Score	Note
	Jose Romero Martinez/Jessica Valencia Naveda	Ecuador	32.67	Q
	Simone Sanfilippo/Serena Maso	Italy	34.73	Q
	Juan Alejandro Pallares/Magali Piedra	Spain	31.80	Q
	Yefersson Benjumea/Adriana Avila	Colombia	35.00	Q
	Jakub Mazuch/Tereza Vodičková	Czech Republic	32.83	Q
	Stevens Rebolledo/Yinessa Ortega	Colombia	35.03	Q
7	Jordan Muillerac/Laure Ibanez	France	30.33	
8	Mate Pek/Edit Lilla Nagy	Hungary	30.33	

=== Final ===
Rank	Athletes	Nation	Score
1st place, gold medalist(s)	Stevens Rebolledo/Yinessa Ortega	Colombia	37.54
2nd place, silver medalist(s)	Yefersson Benjumea/Adriana Avila	Colombia	37.21
3rd place, bronze medalist(s)	Simone Sanfilippo/Serena Maso	Italy	36.04
4	Jakub Mazuch/Tereza Vodičková	Czech Republic	33.67
6	Juan Alejandro Pallares/Magali Piedra	Spain	32.17
5	Jose Romero Martinez/Jessica Valencia Naveda	Ecuador	33.50
