= Archery at the 2017 World Games – Women's individual compound =

Archery women's individual compound at the 2017 World Games
- Venue: AWF Witelona, Wrocław, Poland
- Dates: 29–30 July
- Competitors: 24 from 20 nations

Medalists
gold medal	Sara López	Colombia
silver medal	Toja Ellison	Slovenia
bronze medal	Christie Colin	United States

The women's individual compound archery competition at the 2017 World Games took place from 29 to 30 July 2017 at the AWF Witelona in Wrocław, Poland.

== Results ==
=== Ranking round ===
Rank	Archer	Nation	Score	10s	Xs
1	Sara López	Colombia	707 (WGQ)	59	31
2	Sarah Sonnichsen	Denmark	704	56	23
3	Linda Ochoa-Anderson	Mexico	700	54	26
4	Aleksandra Savenkova	Russia	698	50	19
5	Sarah Prieels	Belgium	697	50	26
6	Toja Ellison	Slovenia	696	50	25
7	Cassidy Cox	United States	696	50	24
8	Song Yun-soo	South Korea	695	51	14
9	Chen Yi-hsuan	Chinese Taipei	694	47	20
10	Amelie Sancenot	France	691	47	16
11	Marcella Tonioli	Italy	690	46	23
12	Mariya Shkolna	Poland	690	43	21
13	Stephanie Salinas	Mexico	688	42	15
14	Maria Vinogradova	Russia	688	41	18
15	Christie Colin	United States	687	44	25
16	Sanne de Laat	Netherlands	686	44	20
17	Sherry Gale	Australia	686	42	9
18	Nancy Elgibily	Egypt	685	42	16
19	Andrea Marcos	Spain	685	40	9
20	Parisa Baratchi	Iran	683	42	6
21	Marla Cintron	Puerto Rico	675	37	18
22	Louise Redman	Australia	674	35	17
23	Aya Cojuangco	Philippines	673	31	16
24	Ilana Malan	Namibia	665	31	13

=== Competition bracket ===
Round of 32; 29 July
17	(Australia) Sherry Gale	140
16	(Netherlands) Sanne de Laat	144
9	(Chinese Taipei) Chen Yi-hsuan	141
24	(Namibia) Ilana Malan	142
21	(Puerto Rico) Marla Cintron	139
12	(Poland) Mariya Shkolna	143
13	(Mexico) Stephanie Salinas	145
20	(Iran) Parisa Baratchi	140
19	(Spain) Andrea Marcos	146
14	(Russia) Maria Vinogradova	140
11	(Italy) Marcella Tonioli	143
22	(Australia) Louise Redman	134
23	(Philippines) Aya Cojuangco	144
10	(France) Amelie Sancenot	140
15	(United States) Christie Colin	143
18	(Egypt) Nancy Elgibily	140

Round of 16; 29 July
1	(Colombia) Sara López	149
16	(Netherlands) Sanne de Laat	143
24	(Namibia) Ilana Malan	134
8	(South Korea) Song Yun-soo	145
5	(Belgium) Sarah Prieels	146
12	(Poland) Mariya Shkolna	144
13	(Mexico) Stephanie Salinas	143
4	(Russia) Aleksandra Savenkova	147
3	(Mexico) Linda Ochoa-Anderson	148
19	(Spain) Andrea Marcos	143
11	(Italy) Marcella Tonioli	142
6	(Slovenia) Toja Ellison	143
7	(United States) Cassidy Cox	145
23	(Philippines) Aya Cojuangco	140
15	(United States) Christie Colin	145
2	(Denmark) Sarah Sonnichsen	144

Quarterfinals; 29 July
1	(Colombia) Sara López	149
8	(South Korea) Song Yun-soo	147
5	(Belgium) Sarah Prieels	145
4	(Russia) Aleksandra Savenkova	145*
3	(Mexico) Linda Ochoa-Anderson	146
6	(Slovenia) Toja Ellison	147
7	(United States) Cassidy Cox	142
15	(United States) Christie Colin	146

Semifinals; 30 July
1	(Colombia) Sara López	146
4	(Russia) Aleksandra Savenkova	137
6	(Slovenia) Toja Ellison	140
15	(United States) Christie Colin	135

Final; 30 July
1	(Colombia) Sara López	147
6	(Slovenia) Toja Ellison	144
Third place 30 July
4	(Russia) Aleksandra Savenkova	137
15	(United States) Christie Colin	137*
