= Powerlifting at the 2017 World Games =

- Venue: National Forum of Music
- Dates: 24–26 July 2017
- No. of events: 8
- Competitors: 80 from 23 nations

The powerlifting competition at the 2017 World Games took place from July 24 to July 26, in Wrocław in Poland, at the National Forum of Music.

== Participating nations ==
- Algeria (1)
- Brazil (4)
- Canada (4)
- Chinese Taipei (5)
- Czech Republic (1)
- Ecuador (4)
- Finland (1)
- France (3)
- Germany (3)
- Hungary (1)
- Iceland (1)
- Italy (1)
- Japan (4)
- Kazakhstan (2)
- Netherlands (2)
- Norway (5)
- Poland (6)
- Puerto Rico (1)
- Russia (7)
- South Africa (1)
- Ukraine (10)
- United States (9)
- Venezuela (4)

== Medal table ==
Rank	Nation	Gold	Silver	Bronze	Total
1	Ukraine	3	2	2	7
2	Russia	2	2	0	4
3	United States	1	2	2	5
4	Brazil	1	0	0	1
4	Poland	1	0	0	1
6	France	0	1	0	1
6	Japan	0	1	0	1
8	Chinese Taipei	0	0	2	2
9	Kazakhstan	0	0	1	1
9	Venezuela	0	0	1	1
Totals (10 entries)		8	8	8	24

=== Men ===
Event	Gold	Silver	Bronze
Lightweight	Sergey Fedosienko; Russia	Hassan El Belghitti; France	Charles Okpoko; United States
Middleweight	Jaroslaw Olech; Poland	Volodymyr Rysiev; Ukraine	Andriy Naniev; Ukraine
Heavyweight	Sergii Bilyi; Ukraine	Dmitry Inzarkin; Russia	Dmytro Semenenko; Ukraine
Super heavyweight	Oleksii Rokochiy; Ukraine	Joseph Cappellino; United States	Nurlan Yeshmakhanov; Kazakhstan

=== Women ===
Event	Gold	Silver	Bronze
Lightweight	Natalia Salnikova; Russia	Yukako Fukushima; Japan	Chen Wei-ling; Chinese Taipei
Middleweight	Larysa Soloviova; Ukraine	Anna Ryzhkova; Russia	Wu Hui-chun; Chinese Taipei
Heavyweight	Ana Castellain; Brazil	Priscilla Ribic; United States	Yenifer Canelon; Venezuela
Super heavyweight	Bonica Lough; United States	Tetyana Melnyk; Ukraine	Liane Blyn; United States
