= Archery at the 2017 World Games – Men's individual recurve =

Men's individual recurve at the 2017 World Games
- Venue: Szczytnicki Park, Wrocław, Poland
- Dates: 23–25 July
- Competitors: 12 from 11 nations

Medalists
gold medal	(Italy) Amedeo Tonelli
silver medal	(United States) Brady Ellison
bronze medal	(Japan) Wataru Oonuki

The men's recurve archery individual competition at the 2017 World Games took place from 23 to 25 July 2017 at the Szczytnicki Park in Wrocław, Poland.

== Results ==
=== Ranking round ===
Rank	Archer	Nation	Score	6s	5s
1	Brady Ellison	United States	395	40	27
2	Amedeo Tonelli	Italy	365	32	17
3	Matija Mihalić	Croatia	356	25	24
4	Wataru Oonuki	Japan	356	21	30
5	Vic Wunderle	United States	355	23	23
6	Mark Nesbitt	(United Kingdom) Great Britain	352	19	30
7	Sebastian Rohrberg	Germany	351	20	27
8	Jonatan Andersson	Sweden	350	19	28
9	Jean-Charles Valladont	France	347	19	26
10	Juuso Huhtala	Finland	346	23	24
11	Károly Buzás	Hungary	339	16	27
12	Adam Ścibski	Poland	338	21	18

== Competition bracket ==
=== Group A ===
Match 1; 24 July
10	(Finland) Juuso Huhtala	75
11	(Hungary) Károly Buzás	86

Match 2; 24 July
7	(Germany) Sebastian Rohrberg	82
11	(Hungary) Károly Buzás	78

Match 3; 24 July
6	(United Kingdom) Mark Nesbitt	86
7	(Germany) Sebastian Rohrberg	85

Match 4; 24 July
3	(Croatia) Matija Mihalić	89
6	(United Kingdom) Mark Nesbitt	87

=== Group B ===
Match 1; 24 July
12	(Poland) Adam Ścibski	82
9	(France) Jean-Charles Valladont	83

Match 2; 24 July
9	(France) Jean-Charles Valladont	89
8	(Sweden) Jonatan Andersson	85

Match 3; 24 July
9	(France) Jean-Charles Valladont	93
5	(United States) Vic Wunderle	86

Match 4; 24 July
9	(France) Jean-Charles Valladont	86
4	(Japan) Wataru Oonuki	91

=== Finals ===
Semifinals
2	(Italy) Amedeo Tonelli	62
3	(Croatia) Matija Mihalić	61
4	(Japan) Wataru Oonuki	55
1	(United States) Brady Ellison	65

Final
2	(Italy) Amedeo Tonelli	61
1	(United States) Brady Ellison	58
Third place
3	(Croatia) Matija Mihalić	60
4	(Japan) Wataru Oonuki	63
