= Archery at the 2017 World Games – Women's individual barebow =

Archery women's individual barebow at the 2017 World Games
- Venue: Szczytnicki Park, Wrocław, Poland
- Dates: 26–28 July
- Competitors: 12 from 11 nations

Medalists
| gold medal | Cinzia Noziglia | Italy |
| silver medal | Lina Björklund | Sweden |
| bronze medal | Martina Macková | Czech Republic |

The women's barebow archery individual competition at the 2017 World Games took place from 26 to 28 July 2017 at the Szczytnicki Park in Wrocław, Poland.

== Competition format ==
A total of 12 archers entered the competition. After ranking round athletes who come first and second qualifies directly to semifinals. The rest of competitors is divided into two groups, where they compete against each other in the stepladder competition format. The winners of the two groups advances to the semifinals. In group matches athletes shoot 18 arrows, in semifinals and finals - 12 arrows.

== Results ==
=== Ranking round ===
| Rank | Archer | Nation | Score | 6s | 5s |
|---|---|---|---|---|---|
| 1 | Cinzia Noziglia | Italy | 328 | 16 | 19 |
| 2 | Tina Gutman | Slovenia | 308 | 15 | 16 |
| 3 | Lina Björklund | Sweden | 308 | 10 | 22 |
| 4 | Martina Macková | Czech Republic | 305 | 12 | 17 |
| 5 | Chantal Porte | France | 301 | 5 | 20 |
| 6 | Jessica Nilsson | (United Kingdom) Great Britain | 296 | 7 | 17 |
| 7 | Manja Conrad | Germany | 294 | 10 | 18 |
| 8 | Jenifer Stoner | United States | 292 | 8 | 19 |
| 9 | Miyuki Maruyama | Japan | 292 | 7 | 17 |
| 10 | Anne Viljanen | Finland | 282 | 9 | 16 |
| 11 | Eliette Lalouer | France | 281 | 9 | 14 |
| 12 | Martyna Wiśniewska | Poland | 271 | 10 | 12 |

== Competition bracket ==
=== Group A ===
Match 1; 24 July
10 | (Finland) Anne Viljanen | 44
11 | (France) Eliette Lalouer | 61

Match 2; 24 July
7 | (Germany) Manja Conrad | 63
11 | (France) Eliette Lalouer | 77

Match 3; 24 July
6 | (United Kingdom) Jessica Nilsson | 60
11 | (France) Eliette Lalouer | 65

Match 4; 24 July
3 | (Sweden) Lina Björklund | 71
11 | (France) Eliette Lalouer | 65

=== Group B ===
Match 1; 24 July
12 | (Poland) Martyna Wiśniewska | 52
9 | (Japan) Miyuki Maruyama | 59

Match 2; 24 July
9 | (Japan) Miyuki Maruyama | 59
8 | (United States) Jenifer Stoner | 74

Match 3; 24 July
8 | (United States) Jenifer Stoner | 67
5 | (France) Chantal Porte | 79

Match 4; 24 July
5 | (France) Chantal Porte | 68
4 | (Czech Republic) Martina Macková | 78

=== Finals ===
Semifinals
2 | (Slovenia) Tina Gutman | 47
3 | (Sweden) Lina Björklund | 48
4 | (Czech Republic) Martina Macková | 39
1 | (Italy) Cinzia Noziglia | 47

Finals
3 | (Sweden) Lina Björklund | 45
1 | (Italy) Cinzia Noziglia | 49
Third place
2 | (Slovenia) Tina Gutman | 41
4 | (Czech Republic) Martina Macková | 51
