= Air sports at the 2017 World Games – Glider aerobatics =

Glider aerobatics at the 2017 World Games
- Venue: Szymanów Airport, Szymanów, Poland
- Dates: 21–22 July 2017
- Competitors: 11 from 8 nations
- Winning total: 9478.4 points

Medalists
1st place, gold medalist(s)		Ferenc Tóth	Hungary
2nd place, silver medalist(s)		Luca Bertossio	Italy
3rd place, bronze medalist(s)		Eugen Schaal	Germany

The glider aerobatics tournaments at the 2017 World Games in Wrocław was played between 21 and 22 July. 11 glider aerobatics competitors, from 8 nations, participated in the tournament. The air sports competition took place at Szymanów Airport in Szymanów.

== Competition format ==
Final: The 11 Glider aerobatics competitors perform four rounds; the top three divers win the gold, silver and bronze medals accordingly.

== Schedule ==
- All times are Central European Summer Time (UTC+2)

Date	Time	Round
Friday, 21 July	08:00	Final round 01
Friday, 21 July	14:00	Final round 02
Saturday, 22 July	12:30	Final round 03
Saturday, 22 July	17:00	Final round 04

== Results ==
Rank	Nation	Athlete	Round 1	Round 2	Round 3	Round 4	Total
1st place, gold medalist(s)	Hungary	Ferenc Tóth	2288.30 (3)	1880.00 (1)	1906.10 (1)	3404.00 (1)	9478.40
2nd place, silver medalist(s)	Italy	Luca Bertossio	2209.70 (5)	1652.60 (6)	1843.40 (2)	3272.00 (3)	8977.70
3rd place, bronze medalist(s)	Germany	Eugen Schaal	2331.10 (1)	1841.30 (2)	1535.40 (7)	3200.00 (6)	8907.80
4	Russia	Georgij Kaminski	2329.10 (2)	1602.90 (9)	1667.10 (4)	3244.00 (5)	8843.10
5	Hungary	János Szilágyi	2138.60 (9)	1812.00 (4)	1559.00 (6)	3200.00 (7)	8706.80
6	United States	Eric Lentz-Gauthier	2202.20 (7)	1780.70 (5)	1521.20 (8)	3144.00 (10)	8642.60
7	Russia	Vladimir Ilinskiy	2204.70 (6)	1612.10 (8)	1705.73 (3)	3172.00 (8)	8443.90
8	Austria	Siegfried Mayr	1928.50 (11)	1623.30 (7)	1619.50 (5)	3264.00 (4)	8429.50
9	Poland	Jerzy Makula	2043.90 (10)	1814.30 (3)	1227.70 (10)	3300.00 (2)	8129.30
10	France	Daniel Serres	2273.40 (4)	1572.00 (10)	1362.80 (9)	3144.00 (9)	7850.00
11	Germany	Eberhard Holl	2179.30 (8)	1540.60 (11)	876.30 (11)	3120.00 (11)	7463.40

== Medalists ==
Event	Gold	Silver	Bronze
Glider aerobatics	Hungary; Ferenc Tóth	Italy; Luca Bertossio	Germany; Eugen Schaal
