= Lifesaving at the 2017 World Games – Men's 100m Manikin Carry Fins =

Lifesaving - Men's 100m Manikin Carry Fins at the 2017 World Games
- Venue: Orbita Indoor Swimming Pool, Wrocław, Poland
- Dates: 22 July 2017
- Competitors: 20 from 10 nations

Medalists
gold medal	(Italy) Jacopo Musso
silver medal	(Italy) Andrea Vittorio Piroddi
bronze medal	(Germany) Kevin Lehr

The men's 100 m manikin carry with fins event in lifesaving at the 2017 World Games took place on 22 July 2017 at the Orbita Indoor Swimming Pool in Wrocław, Poland.

== Competition format ==
A total of 20 athletes entered the competition. Athletes with the best 8 times in heats qualifies to the final.

== Results ==
=== Heats ===
Rank	Heat	Lane	Name	Nation	Time	Notes
1	3	4	Jan Malkowski	Germany	45.60	Q GR
2	2	4	Andrea Vittorio Piroddi	Italy	45.87	Q
3	3	3	Samuel Bell	Australia	46.65	Q
4	2	5	Kevin Lehr	Germany	46.72	Q
5	3	5	Steven Kent	New Zealand	47.01	Q
6	1	4	Jacopo Musso	Italy	47.16	Q
7	1	6	Francisco Javier Catala	Spain	47.20	Q
8	1	3	Antoine Thos	France	47.21	Q
9	1	5	Shun Nishiyama	Japan	47.26	
10	2	6	Matthew Davis	Australia	47.85	
10	3	2	Cezary Kępa	Poland	47.85	
12	2	2	Keisuke Hatano	Japan	48.43	
13	3	6	Sergio Calderon	Spain	48.48	
14	1	2	Jacob Hales	New Zealand	49.13	
15	2	3	Gaetan Quirin	France	49.94	
16	2	7	Joni Ceusters	Belgium	50.93	
17	1	7	Lenz Bolkmans	Belgium	51.58	
18	3	1	Bartosz Makowski	Poland	52.09	
19	2	1	Zhao Xuanming	China	56.77	
20	3	7	Niu Yujie	China	59.13	

=== Final ===
Rank	Lane	Athlete	Nation	Time	Note
1st place, gold medalist(s)	7	Jacopo Musso	Italy	45.40	GR
2nd place, silver medalist(s)	5	Andrea Vittorio Piroddi	Italy	45.62	
3rd place, bronze medalist(s)	6	Kevin Lehr	Germany	46.25	
4	4	Jan Malkowski	Germany	46.30	
5	3	Samuel Bell	Australia	46.44	
6	2	Steven Kent	New Zealand	46.63	
7	1	Francisco Javier Catala	Spain	47.20	
8	8	Antoine Thos	France	47.34	
