= Ju-jitsu at the 2017 World Games – Women's fighting 55 kg =

Women's fighting 55 kg at the 2017 World Games
- Venue: GEM Sports Complex
- Date: 28 July 2017
- Competitors: 6 from 6 nations

Medalists
| 1st place, gold medalist(s) | | (Denmark) Rebekka Dahl |
| 2nd place, silver medalist(s) | | (France) Laure Beauchet |
| 3rd place, bronze medalist(s) | | (Italy) Jessica Scricciolo |

The women's fighting 62 kg competition in ju-jitsu at the 2017 World Games took place on 28 July 2017 at the GEM Sports Complex in Wrocław, Poland.

== Results ==
=== Elimination round ===
==== Group A ====
| Rank | Athlete | B | W | L | Pts | Score |
|---|---|---|---|---|---|---|
| 1 | Magdalena Giec (POL) | 2 | 2 | 0 | 23–21 | +2 |
| 2 | Jessica Scricciolo (ITA) | 2 | 1 | 1 | 59–10 | +49 |
| 3 | Romina Lopez (URU) | 2 | 0 | 2 | 12–63 | –51 |

| | Score | |
|---|---|---|
| Jessica Scricciolo (ITA) | 50–0 | Romina Lopez (URU) |
| Jessica Scricciolo (ITA) | 9–10 | Magdalena Giec (POL) |
| Romina Lopez (URU) | 12–13 | Magdalena Giec (POL) |

==== Group B ====
| Rank | Athlete | B | W | L | Pts | Score |
|---|---|---|---|---|---|---|
| 1 | Rebekka Dahl (DEN) | 2 | 2 | 0 | 60–11 | +49 |
| 2 | Laure Beauchet (FRA) | 2 | 1 | 1 | 18–27 | –9 |
| 3 | Panagiota Latsinou (GRE) | 2 | 0 | 2 | 17–57 | –40 |

| | Score | |
|---|---|---|
| Laure Beauchet (FRA) | 6–7 | Rebekka Dahl (DEN) |
| Laure Beauchet (FRA) | 13–8 | Panagiota Latsinou (GRE) |
| Rebekka Dahl (DEN) | 50–0 | Panagiota Latsinou (GRE) |

=== Finals ===
Semifinals
Magdalena Giec (POL) | 7
Laure Beauchet (FRA) | 10
Rebekka Dahl (DEN) | 5
Jessica Scricciolo (ITA) | 2

Final
Laure Beauchet (FRA) | 5
Rebekka Dahl (DEN) | 9
Third place
Magdalena Giec (POL) | 8
Jessica Scricciolo (ITA) | 14
