= Sumo at the 2017 World Games =

- Venue: Orbita Hall
- Dates: 22–23 July 2017
- No. of events: 8
- Competitors: 93 from 17 nations

The sumo competition at the 2017 World Games took place from July 22 to July 23, in Wrocław in Poland, at the Orbita Hall.

== Participating nations ==
- Australia (4)
- Brazil (8)
- Chinese Taipei (1)
- Egypt (5)
- Georgia (2)
- Germany (4)
- Hungary (3)
- Hong Kong (1)
- Japan (9)
- Mongolia (7)
- Norway (1)
- Poland (11)
- Russia (10)
- Thailand (3)
- Ukraine (8)
- United States (10)
- Venezuela (6)

== Medal table ==
Rank	Nation	Gold	Silver	Bronze	Total
1	Russia	6	2	1	9
2	Ukraine	1	1	1	3
3	Mongolia	1	0	1	2
4	Egypt	0	2	0	2
5	Japan	0	1	2	3
6	Brazil	0	1	0	1
6	United States	0	1	0	1
8	Poland	0	0	2	2
9	Thailand	0	0	1	1
Totals (9 entries)		8	8	8	24

=== Men ===
Event	Gold	Silver	Bronze
Lightweight	Batyr Altyev; Russia	Trent Sabo; United States	Paweł Wojda; Poland
Middleweight	Atsamaz Kaziev; Russia	Misbah Hossam; Egypt	Usukhbayar Ochirkhuu; Mongolia
Heavyweight	Vasilii Margiev; Russia	Ramy Belal; Egypt	Soichiro Kurokawa; Japan
Openweight	Vasilii Margiev; Russia	Batyr Altyev; Russia	Hayato Miwa; Japan

=== Women ===
Event	Gold	Silver	Bronze
Lightweight	Svitlana Trosiuk; Ukraine	Luciana Montgomery Higuchi; Brazil	Magdalena Macios; Poland
Middleweight	Munkhtsetseg Otgon; Mongolia	Asano Ota; Japan	Maryna Maksymenko; Ukraine
Heavyweight	Anna Poliakova; Russia	Olga Davydko; Russia	Viparat Vituteerasan; Thailand
Openweight	Anna Poliakova; Russia	Ivanna Berezovska; Ukraine	Olga Davydko; Russia
