= Archery at the 2017 World Games – Women's individual recurve =

Women's individual recurve at the 2017 World Games
- Venue: Szczytnicki Park, Wrocław, Poland
- Dates: 23–25 July
- Competitors: 12 from 10 nations

Medalists
gold medal	Lisa Unruh	Germany
silver medal	Naomi Folkard	Great Britain
bronze medal	Jessica Tomasi	Italy

The women's recurve archery individual competition at the 2017 World Games took place from 23 to 25 July 2017 at the Szczytnicki Park in Wrocław, Poland.

== Results ==
=== Ranking round ===
Rank	Archer	Nation	Score	6s	5s
1	Lisa Unruh	Germany	375	30	28
2	Laurence Baldauff	Austria	361	24	28
3	Ana Umer	Slovenia	356	22	27
4	Bryony Pitman	(United Kingdom) Great Britain	355	25	24
5	Naomi Folkard	(United Kingdom) Great Britain	355	25	22
6	Elin Kättström	Sweden	348	20	27
7	Jessica Tomasi	Italy	341	23	15
8	Heather Koehl	United States	323	14	22
9	Zoé Göbbels	Belgium	316	11	21
10	Natalia Leśniak	Poland	315	14	22
11	Joanna Rząsa	Poland	315	12	20
12	Jindřiška Vaněčková	Czech Republic	314	10	30

=== Competition bracket ===
==== Group A ====
Match 1; 24 July
10	(Poland) Natalia Leśniak	69
11	(Poland) Joanna Rząsa	80

Match 2; 24 July
7	(Italy) Jessica Tomasi	82
11	(Poland) Joanna Rząsa	81

Match 3; 24 July
6	(Sweden) Elin Kättström	82
7	(Italy) Jessica Tomasi	83

Match 4; 24 July
3	(Slovenia) Ana Umer	76
7	(Italy) Jessica Tomasi	79

==== Group B ====
Match 1; 24 July
12	(Czech Republic) Jindřiška Vaněčková	78
9	(Belgium) Zoé Göbbels	76

Match 2; 24 July
12	(Czech Republic) Jindřiška Vaněčková	85
8	(United States) Heather Koehl	74

Match 3; 24 July
12	(Czech Republic) Jindřiška Vaněčková	78
5	(United Kingdom) Naomi Folkard	94

Match 4; 24 July
5	(United Kingdom) Naomi Folkard	83
4	(United Kingdom) Bryony Pitman	80

==== Finals ====
Semifinals
1	(Germany) Lisa Unruh	60
7	(Italy) Jessica Tomasi	56
5	(United Kingdom) Naomi Folkard	60
2	(Austria) Laurence Baldauff	63

Finals
1	(Germany) Lisa Unruh	52*
5	(United Kingdom) Naomi Folkard	52
Third place
7	(Italy) Jessica Tomasi	51
2	(Austria) Laurence Baldauff	50
