= Powerlifting at the 2017 World Games – Women's heavyweight =

Powerlifting - Women's Heavyweight at the 2017 World Games
- Venue: National Forum of Music, Wrocław, Poland
- Dates: 25 July 2017
- Competitors: 10 from 10 nations

Medalists
gold medal	(Brazil) Ana Castellain
silver medal	(United States) Priscilla Ribic
bronze medal	(Venezuela) Yenifer Canelon

The women's heavyweight competition in powerlifting at the 2017 World Games took place on 25 July 2017 at the National Forum of Music in Wrocław, Poland.

== Competition format ==
A total of 10 athletes entered the competition. Each athlete had 3 attempts in each of 3 events: squat, bench press and deadlift. The athlete with the biggest score in Wilks points is the winner.

== Results ==
Rank	Athlete	Nation	Weight	Squat	Bench press	Deadlift	Total weight	Total points
1st place, gold medalist(s)	Ana Castellain	Brazil	67.0	247.5	175.0	212.5	635.0	651.83
2nd place, silver medalist(s)	Priscilla Ribic	United States	69.9	235.0	160.0	240.0	635.0	632.08
3rd place, bronze medalist(s)	Yenifer Canelon	Venezuela	63.0	235.0	132.5	220.0	587.5	630.80
4	Marte Elverum	Norway	71.6	242.5	140.0	248.5	631.0	618.38
5	Rhaea Stinn	Canada	71.0	247.5	157.5	207.5	612.5	603.43
6	Antonietta Orsini	Italy	64.3	212.5	140.0	202.5	555.0	586.80
7	Ankie Timmers	Netherlands	71.3	220.0	157.5	217.5	595.0	584.35
8	Yulia Medvedeva	Russia	63.2	205.0	152.5	170.0	527.5	565.11
9	Johanna Aguinaga	Ecuador	65.0	195.0	155.0	175.0	525.0	550.88
10	Chantelle Du Toit	South Africa	71.8	162.5	110.0	160.0	432.5	422.99
