= Powerlifting at the 2017 World Games – Men's lightweight =

Powerlifting - Men's Lightweight at the 2017 World Games
- Venue: National Forum of Music, Wrocław, Poland
- Dates: 24 July 2017
- Competitors: 9 from 8 nations

Medalists
gold medal	(Russia) Sergey Fedosienko
silver medal	(France) Hassan El Belghiti
bronze medal	(United States) Charles Okpoko

The men's lightweight competition in powerlifting at the 2017 World Games took place on 24 July 2017 at the National Forum of Music in Wrocław, Poland.

== Competition format ==
A total of 9 athletes entered the competition. Each athlete had 3 attempts in each of 3 events: squat, bench press and deadlift. The athlete with the biggest score in Wilks points is the winner.

== Results ==
Rank	Athlete	Nation	Weight	Squat	Bench press	Deadlift	Total weight	Total points
1st place, gold medalist(s)	Sergey Fedosienko	Russia	55.9	290.0	192.5	260.0	742.5	677.71
2nd place, silver medalist(s)	Hassan El Belghiti	France	65.6	290.0	167.5	315.0	772.5	609.43
3rd place, bronze medalist(s)	Charles Okpoko	United States	65.4	312.5	200.0	257.5	770.0	608.99
4	Hsieh Tsung-ting	Chinese Taipei	64.5	265.0	210.0	280.0	755.0	604.30
5	Franklin León	Ecuador	59.2	280.0	177.5	235.0	692.5	597.49
6	Antti Savolainen	Finland	65,7	270.0	200.0	285.0	755.0	595.24
7	Lin Yi-chun	Chinese Taipei	59.5	260.0	170.0	257.5	687.5	590.77
8	Yoshihiro Sato	Japan	65.4	265.0	215.0	235.0	715.0	565.99
9	Dariusz Wszoła	Poland	58.8	260.0	170.0	217.5	647.5	562.81
