= Powerlifting at the 2017 World Games – Women's super heavyweight =

Powerlifting - Women's Super heavyweight at the 2017 World Games
- Venue: National Forum of Music, Wrocław, Poland
- Dates: 26 July 2017
- Competitors: 10 from 8 nations

Medalists
gold medal	(United States) Bonica Lough
silver medal	(Ukraine) Tetyana Melnyk
bronze medal	(United States) Liane Blyn

The women's super heavyweight competition in powerlifting at the 2017 World Games took place on 26 July 2017 at the National Forum of Music in Wrocław, Poland.

== Competition format ==
A total of 10 athletes entered the competition. Each athlete had 3 attempts in each of 3 events: squat, bench press and deadlift. The athlete with the biggest score in Wilks points is the winner.

== Results ==
Rank	Athlete	Nation	Weight	Squat	Bench press	Deadlift	Total weight	Total points
1st place, gold medalist(s)	Bonica Lough	United States	131.0	310.5	205.0	247.5	763.0 WR	600.71
2nd place, silver medalist(s)	Tetyana Melnyk	Ukraine	73.2	245.0	170.0	205.0	620.0	598.36
3rd place, bronze medalist(s)	Liane Blyn	United States	79.5	242.5	182.5	217.5	642.5	590.07
4	Ielja Strik	Netherlands	84.5	255.0	172.5	212.5	640.0	569.02
5	Yevheniia Tishakova	Ukraine	80.9	260.0	140.0	220.0	620.0	563.95
6	Heidi Hille Arnesen	Norway	83.8	247.5	145.0	215.0	607.5	542.50
7	Marzena Wierzbicka	Poland	74.2	220.0	130.0	210.0	560.0	535.86
8	Nadezhda Sindikas	Russia	82.6	225.0	150.0	202.5	577.5	519.40
9	Agnes Szabo	Hungary	117.0	260.0	195.0	190.0	645.0	518.13
10	Chang Ya-Wen	Chinese Taipei	96.2	245.0	145.0	217.5	607.5	511.94
