= Sumo at the 2017 World Games – Men's lightweight =

Sumo - Men's Lightweight at the 2017 World Games
- Venue: Orbita Hall, Wrocław, Poland
- Dates: 22 July 2017
- Competitors: 15 from 11 nations

Medalists
| gold medal | (Russia) Batyr Altyev |
| silver medal | (United States) Trent Sabo |
| bronze medal | (Poland) Paweł Wojda |

The men's lightweight competition in sumo at the 2017 World Games took place on 22 July 2017 at the Orbita Hall in Wrocław, Poland.

== Competition format ==
A total of 15 athletes entered the competition. They fought in the cup system with repechages.

== Results ==
=== Main draw ===
| | Score | |
1/16 Finals
| (Russia) Batyr Altyev (RUS) | | Bye |
| (Poland) Paweł Wojda (POL) | Uwatenage | (Thailand) Jakkrapong Chaorungmetee (THA) |
| (Egypt) Abdelrahman Elsefy (EGY) | Oshitaoshi | (United States) Andrew Freund (USA) |
| (Brazil) Cristiano Silva Mori (BRA) | Kotenage | (Australia) Joel Kindred (AUS) |
| (Poland) Patryk Swora (POL) | Yoritaoshi | (Mongolia) Badral Baasandorj (MGL) |
| (Ukraine) Kostiantyn Bulatov (UKR) | Uwatenage | (Venezuela) Oscar Hernandez (VEN) |
| (United States) Trent Sabo (USA) | Yorikiri | (Egypt) Fathy Abouelrokb (EGY) |
| (Australia) Thomas Traill (AUS) | Oshitaoshi | (Japan) Isao Shibaoka (JPN) |
Quarterfinals
| (Russia) Batyr Altyev (RUS) | Uchimuso | (Poland) Paweł Wojda (POL) |
| (Egypt) Abdelrahman Elsefy (EGY) | Oshidashi | (Australia) Joel Kindred (AUS) |
| (Mongolia) Badral Baasandorj (MGL) | Katasukashi | (Ukraine) Kostiantyn Bulatov (UKR) |
| (United States) Trent Sabo (USA) | Hatakikomi | (Japan) Isao Shibaoka (JPN) |

=== Repechages ===
| | Score | |
1/16 Repechages
| (Poland) Paweł Wojda (POL) | | Bye |
| (Australia) Joel Kindred (AUS) | Tsuridashi | (United States) Andrew Freund (USA) |
| (Mongolia) Badral Baasandorj (MGL) | Yoritaoshi | (Venezuela) Oscar Hernandez (VEN) |
| (Japan) Isao Shibaoka (JPN) | Tsukiotoshi | (Egypt) Fathy Abouelrokb (EGY) |
Repechages Quarterfinals
| (Poland) Paweł Wojda (POL) | Yoritaoshi | (Australia) Joel Kindred (AUS) |
| (Mongolia) Badral Baasandorj (MGL) | Yoritaoshi | (Egypt) Fathy Abouelrokb (EGY) |

=== Semifinals ===
| | Score | |
Semifinals
| (Russia) Batyr Altyev (RUS) | Shitatedashinage | (Egypt) Abdelrahman Elsefy (EGY) |
| (Ukraine) Kostiantyn Bulatov (UKR) | Yorikiri | (United States) Trent Sabo (USA) |
Repechages Semifinals
| (Ukraine) Kostiantyn Bulatov (UKR) | Sukuinage | (Poland) Paweł Wojda (POL) |
| (Egypt) Abdelrahman Elsefy (EGY) | Yoritaoshi | (Egypt) Fathy Abouelrokb (EGY) |

=== Finals ===
| | Score | |
Gold medal match
| (Russia) Batyr Altyev (RUS) | Uwatedashinage | (United States) Trent Sabo (USA) |
Bronze medal match
| (Poland) Paweł Wojda (POL) | Yorikiri | (Egypt) Fathy Abouelrokb (EGY) |
