= Ju-jitsu at the 2017 World Games – Women's fighting 62 kg =

Women's fighting 62 kg at the 2017 World Games
- Venue: GEM Sports Complex
- Date: 28 July 2017
- Competitors: 6 from 6 nations

Medalists
1st place, gold medalist(s)		(France) Séverine Nébié
2nd place, silver medalist(s)		(Italy) Annalisa Cavarretta
3rd place, bronze medalist(s)		(Germany) Carina Neupert

The women's fighting 62 kg competition in ju-jitsu at the 2017 World Games took place on 28 July 2017 at the GEM Sports Complex in Wrocław, Poland.

== Results ==
=== Elimination round ===
==== Group A ====
Rank	Athlete	B	W	L	Pts	Score
1	Séverine Nébié (FRA)	2	2	0	25–1	+24
2	Annalisa Cavarretta (ITA)	2	1	1	15–11	+4
3	Olga Medvedeva (RUS)	2	0	2	0–28	–28

	Score	
Séverine Nébié (FRA)	14–0	Olga Medvedeva (RUS)
Séverine Nébié (FRA)	11–1	Annalisa Cavarretta (ITA)
Olga Medvedeva (RUS)	0–14	Annalisa Cavarretta (ITA)

==== Group B ====
Rank	Athlete	B	W	L	Pts	Score
1	Carina Neupert (GER)	2	2	0	66–5	+61
2	Marta Walotek (POL)	2	1	1	12–56	–44
3	Madeline Choconta Rojas (COL)	2	0	2	11–28	–17

	Score	
Carina Neupert (GER)	16–5	Madeline Choconta Rojas (COL)
Carina Neupert (GER)	50–0	Marta Walotek (POL)
Madeline Choconta Rojas (COL)'	6–12	Marta Walotek (POL)

=== Finals ===
Semifinals
Séverine Nébié (FRA)	50
Marta Walotek (POL)	0
Carina Neupert (GER)	7
Annalisa Cavarretta (ITA)	8

Final
Séverine Nébié (FRA)	50
Annalisa Cavarretta (ITA)	0
Third place
Marta Walotek (POL)	4
Carina Neupert (GER)	20
