= Water skiing at the 2017 World Games – Men's jump =

Water skiing - Men's Jump at the 2017 World Games
- Venue: Old Odra River, Wrocław, Poland
- Dates: 26–27 July 2017
- Competitors: 12 from 11 nations

Medalists
gold medal	(Germany) Bojan Schipner
silver medal	(Chile) Rodrigo Miranda
bronze medal	(Belarus) Aliaksandr Isayeu

The men's jump competition in water skiing at the 2017 World Games took place from 26 to 27 July 2017 at the Old Odra River in Wrocław, Poland.

== Competition format ==
A total of 12 athletes entered the competition. From qualifications the best 8 skiers qualify to final.

== Results ==
=== Qualifications ===
Rank	Athlete	Nation	Result	Note
1	Jack Critchley	(United Kingdom) Great Britain	60.5	Q
2	Bojan Schipner	Germany	60.3	Q
3	Aliaksandr Isayeu	Belarus	60.1	Q
4	Adam Sedlmajer	Czech Republic	59.7	Q
5	Luca Spinelli	Italy	59.1	Q
6	Igor Morozov	Russia	58.8	Q
7	Rodrigo Miranda	Chile	58.4	Q
8	Claudio Köstenberger	Austria	57.0	Q
9	Alex Paradis	Canada	56.0	
10	Josh Wallent	Australia	54.9	
11	Kamil Borysewicz	Poland	54.1	
12	Josh Briant	Australia	52.0	

=== Final ===
Rank	Athlete	Nation	Result
1st place, gold medalist(s)	Bojan Schipner	Germany	64.6
2nd place, silver medalist(s)	Rodrigo Miranda	Chile	62.8
3rd place, bronze medalist(s)	Aliaksandr Isayeu	Belarus	62.4
4	Igor Morozov	Russia	62.2
5	Adam Sedlmajer	Czech Republic	59.7
6	Luca Spinelli	Italy	59.7
7	Claudio Köstenberger	Austria	58.5
8	Jack Critchley	(United Kingdom) Great Britain	58.2
