= Indoor rowing at the 2017 World Games – Men's lightweight 2000 metres =

Men's lightweight 2000 metres at the 2017 World Games
- Venue: Multifunctional Hall
- Location: Jelcz-Laskowice, Poland
- Dates: 26 July
- Competitors: 11 from 11 nations

Medalists
gold medal	Artur Mikolajczewski	Poland
silver medal	Florian Berg	Austria
bronze medal	Jaruwat Saensuk	Thailand

The men's lightweight 2000 metres event in indoor rowing at the 2017 World Games took place on the 26 July 2017 at the Multifunctional Hall in Jelcz-Laskowice.

== Results ==
GR = games record

Rank	Athlete	NOC	Time	Notes
1st place, gold medalist(s)	Artur Mikołajczewski	Poland	6:08.2	GR
2nd place, silver medalist(s)	Florian Berg	Austria	6:11.5	
3rd place, bronze medalist(s)	Jaruwat Saensuk	Thailand	6:14.9	
4	Leonardo Bava	Italy	6:25.9	
5	Bence Tamas	Hungary	6:27.0	
6	Andrew Neils	United States	6:28.4	
7	Juraj Prokopec	Croatia	6:36.3	
8	Kim Byunghoon	South Korea	6:41.9	
9	Sebastian Adamovici	Romania	6:45.1	
10	Glenn Zammit	Malta	6:49.5	
-	Arnold Omony	Uganda	DNS	
