= Water skiing at the 2017 World Games – Women's slalom =

Water skiing competition held in Poland

Water skiing - Women's Slalom at the 2017 World Games
- Venue: Old Odra River, Wrocław, Poland
- Dates: 25–26 July 2017
- Competitors: 7 from 7 nations

Medalists
gold medal	(Germany) Geena Krueger
silver medal	(France) Clementine Lucine
bronze medal	(Belgium) Kate Adriaensen

The women's slalom competition in water skiing at the 2017 World Games took place from 25 to 26 July 2017 at the Old Odra River in Wrocław, Poland.

== Competition format ==
A total of 7 athletes entered the competition. All of the skiers qualify to final. Skiers have to pass 6 buoys. Every time length of the rope is shorter, respectively: 18.25m, 13.00m, 12.00m, 11.25m, 10.75m and 10.25m. The score include number of good passes of buoys, speed (55 km/h for every athlete) and length of the rope.

== Results ==
=== Qualifications ===
Rank	Athlete	Nation	Result	Note
1	Clementine Lucine	France	1.0b/13.00m	Q
2	Kate Adriaensen	Belgium	0.0b/13.00m	Q
3	Hanna Edeback	Sweden	4.0b/18.25m	Q
4	Marina Mosti	Italy	3.0b/18.25m	Q
4	Alisa Shevkunova	Russia	3.0b/18.25m	Q
6	Geena Krueger	Germany	2.0b/18.25m	Q
7	Samantha Dumala	United States	0.0b/18.25m	Q

=== Final ===
Rank	Athlete	Nation	Result
1st place, gold medalist(s)	Geena Krueger	Germany	2.0b/11.25m
2nd place, silver medalist(s)	Clementine Lucine	France	5.0b/12.00m
3rd place, bronze medalist(s)	Kate Adriaensen	Belgium	5.0b/12.00m
4	Alisa Shevkunova	Russia	5.0b/12.00m
5	Samantha Dumala	United States	4.0b/12.00m
6	Marina Mosti	Italy	3.5b/12.00m
7	Hanna Edeback	Sweden	0.0b/18.25m
