= Abdelrahman El-Sefy =

Egyptian wrestler (born 1998)

Personal information
- Born: 12 August 1998 (age 27)

Sport
- Country: Egypt
- Sport: Greco-Roman wrestling, Sumo
Medal record
Representing Egypt
Men's sumo
World Games
Gold medal – first place	2022 Birmingham	Lightweight
Sumo World Championships
Bronze medal – third place	Taoyuan 2018	Lightweight
Bronze medal – third place	Osaka 2019	Lightweight
- Updated on 20 June 2024

Abdelrahman Ehab Mohamed El-Sefy (born 12 August 1998) is an Egyptian sport wrestler who has competed in amateur sumo wrestling and Greco-Roman wrestling. As a sport wrestler, he competes in the 87 kg division of Greco-Roman wrestling. As an amateur sumo wrestler, he is a gold medalist at the World Games and a two-time bronze medalist at the Sumo World Championships.

== Sumo career ==
In sumo wrestling, El-Safy first participated in the 2017 in the men's lightweight division, where he lost in the semifinals and repechages semifinals. He also competed in the World Sumo Championships, winning a bronze medal in 2018 and 2019.

El-Safy returned to the World Games in 2022, again in the men's lightweight division. In the latter, he won the gold medal. Conversely, the Egyptian sumo team, in which El-Sefy belonged to, was banned from competing in the remaining sumo events after "poor sportsmanship". The poor organization and sportsmanship displayed during that competition led to sumo being dropped from the program ahead of the 2025 World Games.
