= Water skiing at the 2017 World Games – Women's wakeboard =

2017 wakeboard competition

Water skiing - Women's Wakeboard at the 2017 World Games
- Venue: Old Odra River, Wrocław, Poland
- Dates: 25–27 July 2017
- Competitors: 12 from 9 nations

Medalists
gold medal	(United States) Nicola Butler
silver medal	(United States) Erika Lang
bronze medal	(Italy) Alice Virag

The women's wakeboard freestyle competition in water skiing at the 2017 World Games took place from 25 to 27 July 2017 at the Old Odra River in Wrocław, Poland.

== Competition format ==
A total of 12 athletes entered the competition. In semifinals, two best athletes qualify for the final. Athletes who can't qualify through the semifinals take last chance qualifiers, from which the best athlete qualifies to the final.

== Results ==
=== Semifinals ===
Heat 1

Rank	Name	Country	Result	Notes
1	Yun Hee-hyun	South Korea	53.45	Q
2	Erika Lang	United States	53.11	Q
3	Nicola Butler	United States	45.56	R
4	Otoha Kawahara	Japan	44.22	R
5	Alice Virag	Italy	43.00	R
6	Han Qiu	China	40.89	R

Heat 2

Rank	Name	Country	Result	Notes
1	Chiara Virag	Italy	45.33	Q
2	Yuzuki Muneyasi	Japan	32.67	Q
3	Caroline Djupsjo	Sweden	31.22	R
4	Charlotte Bryant	(United Kingdom) Great Britain	24.89	R
5	Larisa Morales	Mexico	21.45	R
6	Sanne Meijer	Netherlands	21.11	R

=== Last Chance Qualifiers ===
Heat 1

Rank	Name	Country	Result	Notes
1	Alice Virag	Italy	43.56	Q
2	Otoha Kawahara	Japan	42.34	
3	Han Qiu	China	42.22	
4	Caroline Djupsjo	Sweden	39.44	

Heat 2

Rank	Name	Country	Result	Notes
1	Nicola Butler	United States	53.78	Q
2	Sanne Meijer	Netherlands	52.56	
3	Charlotte Bryant	(United Kingdom) Great Britain	45.56	
4	Larisa Morales	Mexico	36.89	

=== Final ===
Rank	Name	Country	Result
1st place, gold medalist(s)	Nicola Butler	United States	66.78
2nd place, silver medalist(s)	Erika Lang	United States	65.44
3rd place, bronze medalist(s)	Alice Virag	Italy	55.22
4	Yun Hee-hyun	South Korea	52.33
5	Yuzuki Muneyasi	Japan	50.67
6	Chiara Virag	Italy	47.22
