= Archery at the 2017 World Games – Mixed team compound =

Mixed team compound at the 2017 World Games
- Venue: AWF Witelona, Wrocław, Poland
- Dates: 29–30 July
- Competitors: 16 from 8 nations
- Teams: 8

Medalists
gold medal	Sarah Sönnichsen; Stephan Hansen	Denmark
silver medal	Linda Ochoa-Anderson; Rodolfo González	Mexico
bronze medal	Cassidy Cox; Kris Schaff	United States

The mixed team compound archery competition at the 2017 World Games took place from 29 to 30 July 2017 at the AWF Witelona in Wrocław, Poland.

== Competition format ==
A total of 8 teams competed in this competition. After ranking round teams were divided into pairs in the cup system.

== Results ==
=== Ranking round ===
Rank	Nation	Archers	Score	10s	Xs
1	Denmark	Sarah Sönnichsen; Stephan Hansen	1420 WGQ	124	59
2	Colombia	Sara López; Camilo Cardona	1410	114	54
3	Mexico	Linda Ochoa-Anderson; Rodolfo González	1405	112	61
4	United States	Cassidy Cox; Kris Schaff	1404	110	51
5	France	Amélie Sancenot; Dominique Genet	1402	111	43
6	Netherlands	Sanne de Laat; Mike Schloesser	1400	111	57
7	Iran	Parisa Baratchi; Esmaeil Ebadi	1389	102	34
8	Poland	Mariya Shkolna; Łukasz Przybylski	1389	96	42

=== Competition bracket ===
Quarterfinals; 29 July
1 Denmark	157
8 Poland	151
5 France	153
4 United States	157
3 Mexico	157
6 Netherlands	155
7 Iran	151
2 Colombia	156

Semifinals; 30 July
1 Denmark	153
4 United States	147
3 Mexico	149^{20}
2 Colombia	149^{19}

Gold medal match 30 July
1 Denmark	156
3 Mexico	155
Bronze medal match 30 July
4 United States	154
2 Colombia	151
