= Finswimming at the 2017 World Games – Men's 400 m surface =

Finswimming - Men's Surface 400 m at the 2017 World Games
- Venue: Orbita Indoor Swimming Pool, Wrocław, Poland
- Dates: 21 July 2017
- Competitors: 8 from 6 nations

Medalists
| gold medal | (Hungary) Dénes Kanyó |
| silver medal | (Germany) Max Lauschus |
| bronze medal | (Italy) Davide De Ceglie |

The men's surface 400 m event in finswimming at the 2017 World Games took place on 21 July 2017 at the Orbita Indoor Swimming Pool in Wrocław, Poland.

== Competition format ==
A total of 8 athletes entered the competition. Only final was held.

== Results ==
=== Final ===
| Rank | Athlete | Nation | Time |
|---|---|---|---|
| 1st place, gold medalist(s) | Dénes Kanyó | Hungary | 2:58.41 |
| 2nd place, silver medalist(s) | Max Lauschus | Germany | 2:59.02 |
| 3rd place, bronze medalist(s) | Davide De Ceglie | Italy | 3:01.46 |
| 4 | Jang Seok-hyeok | South Korea | 3:02.06 |
| 5 | Iakov Stryukov | Russia | 3:04.35 |
| 6 | Evgeny Smirnov | Russia | 3:04.46 |
| 7 | Stefano Figini | Italy | 3:05.38 |
| 8 | Christos Christoforidis | Greece | 3:05.42 |
