= Water skiing at the 2017 World Games – Women's tricks =

Water skiing - Women's Tricks at the 2017 World Games
- Venue: Old Odra River, Wrocław, Poland
- Dates: 25–26 July 2017
- Competitors: 8 from 8 nations

Medalists
gold medal	(Belarus) Natallia Berdnikava
silver medal	(France) Clementine Lucine
bronze medal	(Germany) Giannina Bonnemann

The women's tricks competition in water skiing at the 2017 World Games took place from 25 to 26 July 2017 at the Old Odra River in Wrocław, Poland.

== Competition format ==
A total of 8 athletes entered the competition. From qualifications the best 6 skiers qualify to final.

== Results ==
=== Qualifications ===
Rank	Athlete	Nation	Result	Note
1	Anna Gay	United States	9020	Q
2	Natallia Berdnikava	Belarus	8060	Q
3	Clementine Lucine	France	7750	Q
4	Natalia Cuglievan	Peru	6560	Q
5	Valentina Gonzalez	Chile	6070	Q
6	Giannina Bonnemann	Germany	4840	Q
7	Tatiana Churakova	Russia	4790	
8	Kate Adriaensen	Belgium	4140	

=== Final ===
Rank	Athlete	Nation	Result
1st place, gold medalist(s)	Natallia Berdnikava	Belarus	8720
2nd place, silver medalist(s)	Clementine Lucine	France	8250
3rd place, bronze medalist(s)	Giannina Bonnemann	Germany	7920
4	Anna Gay	United States	7850
5	Natalia Cuglievan	Peru	5460
6	Valentina Gonzalez	Chile	3970
