= Finswimming at the 2017 World Games – Men's 50 m apnoea =

Finswimming - Men's Apnoea 50 m at the 2017 World Games
- Venue: Orbita Indoor Swimming Pool, Wrocław, Poland
- Dates: 22 July 2017
- Competitors: 8 from 6 nations

Medalists
gold medal	(Russia) Pavel Kabanov
silver medal	(Colombia) Mauricio Fernandez Castillo
bronze medal	(South Korea) Lee Dong-jin

The men's apnoea 50 m event in finswimming at the 2017 World Games took place on 22 July 2017 at the Orbita Indoor Swimming Pool in Wrocław, Poland.

== Competition format ==
A total of 8 athletes entered the competition. Only final was held.

== Results ==
=== Final ===
Rank	Athlete	Nation	Time	Note
1st place, gold medalist(s)	Pavel Kabanov	Russia	13.87	GR
2nd place, silver medalist(s)	Mauricio Fernandez Castillo	Colombia	13.94	
3rd place, bronze medalist(s)	Lee Dong-jin	South Korea	14.09	
4	Lee Kwan-ho	South Korea	14.10	
5	Loukas Karetzopoulos	Greece	14.48	
6	Aleksey Kazantsev	Russia	14.62	
7	Malte Striegler	Germany	14.73	
8	Nicolas Cochou	France	15.02	
