= Bonica Brown =

American powerlifter

Personal information
- Nationality: United States
- Born: August 4, 1988 (age 38) Battle Creek, Michigan, U.S.
- Weight: 149.6 kg (330 lb)

Sport
- Country: United States (2003–2008; 2013–present)
- Sport: Powerlifting
- Event: 84+ kg
Medal record
Women's powerlifting
Representing United States
The World Games
Silver medal – second place	2022 Birmingham	Super heavyweight
Gold medal – first place	2017 Wrocław	Super heavyweight
IPF World Equipped Powerlifting Championships
5th	2004 Cahors	– 90 kg
Bronze medal – third place	2005 Ylitornio	– 90 kg
Silver medal – second place	2006 Stavanger	– 90 kg
4th	2007 New Delhi	– 90 kg
Silver medal – second place	2014 Aurora	84+ kg
Gold medal – first place	2016 Orlando	84+ kg
Gold medal – first place	2017 Plzeň	84+ kg
Gold medal – first place	2018 Halmstad	84+ kg
Gold medal – first place	2019 Dubai	84+ kg
IPF World Classic Powerlifting Championships
Gold medal – first place	2014 Potchefstroom	84+ kg
Gold medal – first place	2015 Salo	84+ kg
Gold medal – first place	2016 Killeen	84+ kg
Gold medal – first place	2017 Minsk	84+ kg
Gold medal – first place	2018 Calgary	84+ kg
Gold medal – first place	2019 Helsingborg	84+ kg
Gold medal – first place	2022 Sun City	84+ kg
DNF	2023 St. Julian's	84+ kg
5th	2025 Chemnitz	84+ kg
4th	2026 Druskininkai	84+ kg
SBD Sheffield Powerlifting Championships
5th	2023 Sheffield	Absolute
IPF World Sub-Junior Powerlifting Championships
Gold medal – first place	2004 Pretoria	– 90 kg
Gold medal – first place	2005 Fort Wayne	– 90 kg
USA Powerlifting Equipped Nationals
Gold medal – first place	2004 Omaha	– 90 kg
Silver medal – second place	2005 Louis	– 90 kg
Gold medal – first place	2006 Denver	– 90 kg
Gold medal – first place	2007 Baton Rouge	– 90 kg
Gold medal – first place	2008 Killeen	– 90 kg
Gold medal – first place	2014 Baton Rouge	84+ kg
Gold medal – first place	2016 Aurora	84+ kg
Gold medal – first place	2018 Spokane	84+ kg
Gold medal – first place	2019 Lombaro	84+ kg
Powerlifting America Raw Nationals
Gold medal – first place	2022 Austin	84+ kg
Silver medal – second place	2024 Reno	84+ kg
Gold medal – first place	2025 Atlanta	84+ kg
Gold medal – first place	2026 Lake Tahoe	84+ kg
USA Powerlifting Raw Nationals
Gold medal – first place	2014 Aurora	84+ kg
Gold medal – first place	2015 Scranton	84+ kg
Gold medal – first place	2016 Atlanta	84+ kg
Gold medal – first place	2017 Orlando	84+ kg
Gold medal – first place	2018 Spokane	84+ kg
Gold medal – first place	2019 Lombard	84+ kg
Gold medal – first place	2021 Daytona Beach	84+ kg

Bonica Brown (née Lough; born August 4, 1988) is an American powerlifter competing in the IPF. She is a World Games champion, a 4-time Equipped World Champion, a 2-time Sub-Junior Equipped World Champion, and a 7-time Classic World Champion. She has held multiple world records in each division.

== Powerlifting career ==
=== Powerlifting championships ===
==== 2002–2008: Junior and Sub-Junior division ====
Brown began lifting weights on November 25, 2002, at the age of 14. 18 months later, she competed in the IPF open and sub-junior world championships in the 90-kilogram weight class. She secured 5th place in the open competition and first place in the sub-junior competition, where she also broke several sub-junior world records.

In 2006, Brown extended her sub-junior records in the 90-kilogram weight class at the 2006 IPF World Open Powerlifting Championships. She would secure second place in the competition.

==== 2013–present: Open division ====
Brown had stopped competing in powerlifting in 2008, but returned in 2013. She was coached by Kimberly Walford at USA Powerlifting Equipped Nationals, where she won the competition.

In 2018, Brown broke all five world records in the classic 84+ kilogram weight class in the squat, bench press full power and single lift, deadlift, and total at the 2018 IPF World Classic Powerlifting Championships.

In 2023, Brown competed at the inaugural SBD Sheffield Powerlifting Championships after winning the 2022 IPF World Classic Powerlifting Championships. At Sheffield, she secured a new squat world record of 280 kilograms and a total world record of 680 kilograms, and securing 5th at the competition. She competed at the IPF World Classic Powerlifting Championships the same year, squatting 289 kilograms for a world record. However, her record would be annulled after failing to register a total, and the record holder would be given to Sonita Muluh of Belgium, who squatted 285.5 kilograms at the same competition.

=== The World Games ===
Brown qualified for the 2017 World Games, competing as a super heavyweight powerlifter. She would win the competition with a score of 600.71, as well as a squat world record of 310.5 kilograms and a total world record of 763 kilograms.

Brown competed at the 2022 World Games as a super heavyweight powerlifter a second time and broke her squat world record. Initially, Brown had won the competition on her last deadlift attempt of 262.5 kilograms, but the jury overruled her final attempt to a no lift. She secured second place in the competition, losing gold to Rhaea Stinn of Canada.

== Personal records ==
=== Competition bests ===
==== Equipped ====
- Squat: 325 kg (2019)
- Bench Press: 202.5 kg (2019)
- Deadlift: 360.5 kg (2018)
- Total: 793 kg (2019)

==== Raw ====
- Squat: 289 kg (2023)
- Bench Press: 155 kg (2021)
- Deadlift: 252.5 kg (2023)
- Total: 680 kg (2023)

=== Record lifts in competition ===
==== Equipped ====
- Squat – 230 kg – IPF Sub-Junior World Record – October 11, 2006 (−90 kg)
- Bench Press – 125 kg – IPF Sub-Junior World Record – October 11, 2006 (−90 kg)
- Deadlift – 212.5 kg – IPF Sub-Junior World Record – October 11, 2006 (−90 kg)
- Total – 567.5 kg – IPF Sub-Junior World Record – October 11, 2006 (−90 kg)
- Deadlift – 260.5 kg – USA Powerlifting Equipped American Record – May 18, 2018 (+84 kg)
- Total – 778 kg – USA Powerlifting Equipped American Record – May 18, 2018 (+84 kg)
- Squat – 325 kg – USA Powerlifting Equipped American Record – March 5, 2019 (+84 kg)
- Bench Press – 220 kg – USA Powerlifting Equipped Full Power American Record – November 18, 2019 (+84 kg)
- Bench Press – 220 kg – USA Powerlifting Equipped Bench Press Only American Record – November 18, 2019 (+84 kg)
- Squat – 322.5 kg – IPF Equipped Open World Record – October 7, 2022 (+84 kg)
- Total – 791 kg – IPF Equipped Open World Record – October 7, 2022 (+84 kg)

==== Raw ====
- Squat – 242.5 kg – USA Powerlifting Raw American Record – July 20, 2014 (+90 kg)
- Bench Press – 140 kg – USA Powerlifting Raw Full Power American Record – October 10, 2014 (+90 kg)
- Deadlift – 227.5 kg – USA Powerlifting Raw American Record – July 20, 2014 (+90 kg)
- Total – 610 kg – USA Powerlifting Raw American Record – July 20, 2014 (+90 kg)
- Bench Press – 151.5 kg – USA Powerlifting Raw Full Power American Record – October 10, 2017 (+84 kg)
- Bench Press – 151.5 kg – USA Powerlifting Raw Bench Press Only American Record – October 10, 2017 (+84 kg)
- Bench Press – 151.5 kg – IPF Classic Open Full Power World Record – June 6, 2018 (+84 kg)
- Bench Press – 151.5 kg – IPF Classic Open Bench Press Only World Record – June 6, 2018 (+84 kg)
- Deadlift – 247 kg – USA Powerlifting Raw American Record – June 6, 2018 (+84 kg)
- Deadlift – 247 kg – IPF Classic Open World Record – June 6, 2018 (+84 kg)
- Total – 671.5 kg – USA Powerlifting Raw American Record – June 6, 2018 (+84 kg)
- Squat – 276 kg – USA Powerlifting Raw American Record – January 6, 2021 (+84 kg)
- Squat – 280 kg – IPF Classic Open World Record – March 25, 2023 (+84 kg) (Note: Originally, Brown squatted 289 kilograms for a world record at the 2023 Open Classic Powerlifting Championships, but failed to register a total which annulled her world record.)
- Total – 680 kg – IPF Classic Open World Record – March 25, 2023 (+84 kg)
