= Japanese Garden, Wrocław =

Exotic garden in Wrocław, Poland

Coordinates: 51.11°N 17.08°E

Japanese Garden
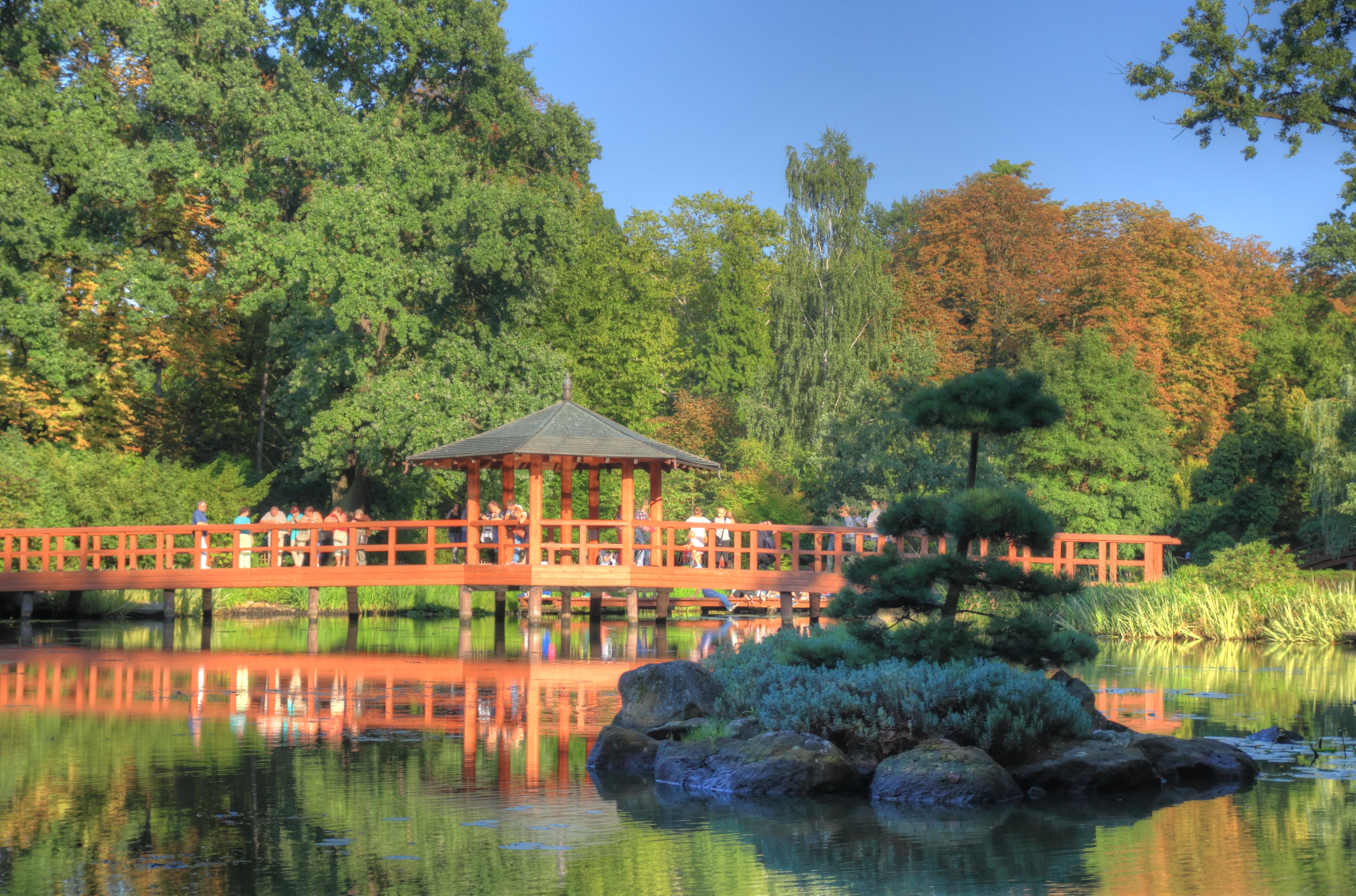
- Interactive map of Japanese Garden
- Type: Tourist attraction
- Location: Szczytnicki Park, Wrocław, Poland
- Created: 1913

The Wrocław Japanese Garden (Polish: Ogród Japoński we Wrocławiu) is located in the Śródmieście district of Wrocław, Poland, in the boundaries of Szczytnicki Park, adjacent to the UNESCO-listed Centennial Hall. An important landmark of the city, it is home to almost 270 taxa of woody plants, as well as 78 species of Asian plants, of which 38 are endemic to Japan, such as Styrax japonicus. The garden was originally founded in the years 1909–1913 as an exotic oasis for the Centennial Exhibition celebrating the 100th anniversary of the German Wars of Liberation in what was then the city of Breslau.

== History ==
The garden has existed since 1913. It was the project of orientalist Baron Fritz von Hochberg, who had an interest in Japanese culture, though the design can be accredited to Japanese gardener Arai Mankichi. In 1995 a major renovation project was undertaken under the direction of professor Ikuya Nishikawa from Tokyo. Next, in 1996–1997, with help from the Japanese Embassy and gardeners from Wrocław and Nagoya, work was undertaken to renew the Japanese character of the garden. The work was directed by Yoshiki Takamura. Two months after the grand opening, the garden was ravaged by the 1997 Central European flood. Another renovation was deemed necessary and the next opening was in 1999.
