= Namibia at the 2022 World Games =

- IOC code: NAM
- NOC: Namibia National Olympic Committee

in Birmingham, United States 7 July 2022 – 17 July 2022
- Competitors: 1 (1 woman) in 1 sport and 1 event
- Medals: Gold 0 Silver 0 Bronze 0 Total 0

World Games appearances
- 1981; 1985; 1989; 1993; 1997; 2001; 2005; 2009; 2013; 2017; 2022

Namibia competed at the 2022 World Games held in Birmingham, United States from 7 to 17 July 2022.

== Competitors ==
The following is the list of number of competitors in the Games.

Sport	Men	Women	Total
Water skiing	0	1	1
Total	0	1	1

== Water skiing ==
Namibia competed in water skiing.

Athlete	Event	Qualification		Repechage		Semifinal		Final	
Athlete	Event	Result	Rank	Result	Rank	Result	Rank	Result	Rank
Natascha Rottcher	Slalom	4.00/55/14.25	6	—				did not advance	
