= Namibia at the 2017 World Games =

Namibia at the World Games 2017
- IOC code: NAM
- NOC: Namibian National Olympic Committee

in Wrocław, Poland 20 July 2017 – 30 July 2017
- Competitors: 2 in 1 sport
- Medals: Gold 0 Silver 0 Bronze 0 Total 0

World Games appearances
- 1981; 1985; 1989; 1993; 1997; 2001; 2005; 2009; 2013; 2017; 2022; 2025

Namibia competed at the World Games 2017 in Wrocław, Poland, from 20 July 2017 to 30 July 2017.

== Competitors ==
| Sports | Men | Women | Total | Events |
|---|---|---|---|---|
| Archery | 1 | 1 | 2 | 2 |
| Total | 1 | 1 | 2 | 2 |

== Archery ==
Namibia has qualified at the 2017 World Games 2 athletes.

| Athlete | Event | Ranking round | | Round of 32 | Round of 16 | Quarterfinals | Semifinals | Final / BM | |
| Athlete | Event | Score | Seed | Opposition Score | Opposition Score | Opposition Score | Opposition Score | Opposition Score | Rank |
|---|---|---|---|---|---|---|---|---|---|
| Louw Nel | Men's compound | 688 | 22 | (Croatia) Domagoj Buden; L 140-147 | did not advance | | | | |
| Ilana Malan | Women's compound | 665 | 24 | (Chinese Taipei) Chen Yi-Hsuan; W 142-141 | (South Korea) Song Yung-Soo; L 134-145 | did not advance | | | |
