= Luca Bertossio =

Italian aerobatics pilot

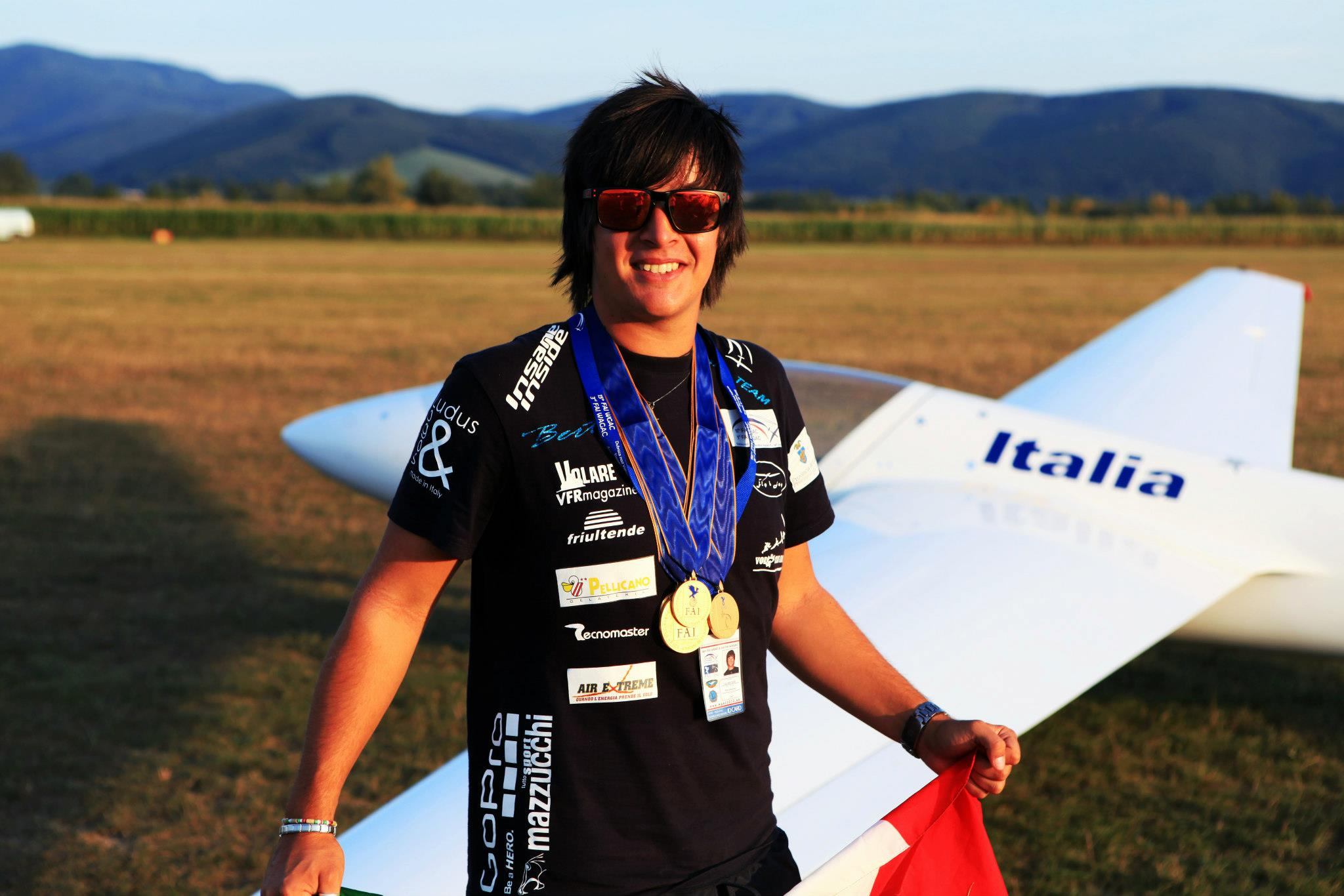
- Luca Bertossio with his 4 Gold medals at WAGAC 2012
- Born: January 24, 1990 (age 36)
- Website: www.bertossio.com

Luca Bertossio (born January 24, 1990) is an Italian aerobatics pilot performing glider aerobatics as competitor for the Italian National Glider Aerobatic Team and as a professional Airshow pilot and flight instructor.

== Career ==
Bertossio is the first Italian to won 9 FAI Gold medals, 8 Silver and 4 Bronze FAI medals for the glider aerobatics discipline, and the titles of Advanced Vice-World Champion 2011 and Advanced World Champion of Glider's Aerobatics in the 2012 WAGAC competition championship, World Air Games Champion 2015, Vice-World Games Champion 2017 and 3 Times Vice-World Overall Unlimited Champion 2015, 2018 and 2021.

Bertossio's flight activity is based mainly at the National Italian Glider's Aerobatic Centers of Ozzano nell'Emilia (BO) and in the past as an instructor at the International Glider Aerobatic Academy in Williams, California (United States).

In the Italian aerobatics history Bertossio reached the best ever placement in the Unlimited category of the WGAC World Championship. He became Vice-World Champion 2015, 2018 and 2021. He is the youngest ever World Air Games Champion 2015-Dubai.

Bertossio also ranked second at the 2017 World Games.

== Pilot's experiences ==
- EASA CPL-IR(A) ME, SE
- EASA ATPL(A) Theory
- Qualifications: PBN, A-UPRT, MCC/JOC
- Endorsements: TMG, NR, TW, RU, VP, G1000, Traino Alianti
- EASA SPL FI
- Certified Unlimited Aerobatic Flight Instructor
- FAA CPL GL
- Statement of Acrobatic Competency by Sean D.Tucker

== Sport experiences and achievements ==
- 2nd level Sport glider aerobatics course with Pietro Filippini 2010
- 3rd level Intermediate glider aerobatics course with Pietro Filippini 2010
- 4th level Advanced glider aerobatics course with Pietro Filippini and Sandor Katona 2011
- 5th level Unlimited glider aerobatics course with Pietro Filippini and Sandor Katona 2011
- Glider aerobatics Airshow pilot course with Pietro Filippini 2011
- Glider aerobatics activity Coordinator and Instructor at National Glider Aerobatics Center of Udine
- Coach at Romanian National Glider Aerobatics Team 2013
- Organization, promotion, communication, sponsorships management and sport logistics for Fly&Joy a.s.d and Volo Club Udine a.s.d
- Aeronautics personality of the year award 2013
- Winner of "Brera" Sport award 2014
- "Premio all'Avvenire" award from Olympics Athletes Association
- Honor Bronze Medal for Sport Achievements 2011
- Official Aerobatic Pilot and Testimonial of CITIZEN Watches co. ltd 2013-2015
- Official Aerobatic Pilot and creator of the Project Sparco AERO

== Sport results ==
- 1st Place and Italian Glider Aerobatics Champion 2010 in Promotion and Sport categories after having obtained the license just a month before the competition
- Entered the Italian National Glider Aerobatics Team in 2011
- 2nd Place and Silver FAI Medal at Unlimited absolut championships in 2011 onboard of a Swift S-1 with around just 35 flights on this glider
- 1st Place and Italian Glider Aerobatics Champion 2011 in the Advanced category on board a Swift S-1
- 2nd Place Silver Medal at the 1st Italian Freestyle's Trophy 2011
- 2nd Place and FAI Silver Medal for the Known program of the WAGAC 2012 World Championship in Poland (first time in the history for an Italian pilot)
- 2nd Place as Vice World Champion at WAGAC 2011 in Poland (first time in the history for an Italian pilot)
- Received 7 FAI Diplomas from the International CIVA Glider Aerobatics Commission
- Recognized and awarded by the 'Aeroclub d'Italia' Italian's flying clubs association on the occasion of its centenary in the beautiful setting of the Circus Maximus in Rome
- Italian champion in glider aerobatics in 2011 in the Intermediate category aboard Swift S-1
- Silver Medal for the Club Class in the Italian Championship aboard Swift S-1
- Entered the Italian National Glider Aerobatics Team in 2012
- Gold Medal in the first Freestyle competition of the 2012 season
- 1st Place as Italian champion in glider aerobatics in 2012 in the Advanced category aboard Swift S-1
- 2nd Place and Silver medal at the championships Absolute Unlimited 2012 aboard Swift S-1
- 1st Place FAI Gold Medal in the Known program WAGAC 2012
- 1st Place FAI Gold Medal in the Unknown programs WAGAC 2012
- 1st Place FAI Gold Medal for the result in Teams (Blue Team ITALY)
- 1st Place FAI Gold Medal Overall and World Champion WAGAC 2012
- 1st Place Winner Freestyle Sassuolo (MO), Italy
- 1st Place Freestyle Gold Medal in 2013 in Rome
- 1st Place First Place at Advanced category Italian Championship 2013
- 2nd Place Silver Medal in the Club class Italian Championship 2013
- 1st Place Freestyle Gold Medal 2013 in Lucca, Italy
- 2nd Place at the International Swiss Glider Aerobatic Championship 2014
- 7th Place at World Glider Aerobatic Championship 2014
- 3rd Place Overall International Danubia Cup 2015
- 3rd Place FAI Bronze Medalist for the Known Compulsory Program WGAC 2015
- 2nd Place FAI Silver Medalist for the Unknown Programs WGAC 2015
- 2nd Place FAI Silver Medalis and Vice-World Champion WGAC 2015 (Best Placement for an Italian Pilot ever)
- 1st Place FAI Gold Medal G1 Free Program World Air Games 2015 Dubai
- 3rd Place FAI Bronze Medal G2 Unknown Program World Air Games 2015 Dubai
- 3rd Place FAI Bronze Medal G3 Freestyle Program World Air Games 2015 Dubai
- 1st Place FAI OVERALL World Air Games Champion 2015 Dubai
- 1st Place Milano Freestyle Trophy 2016
- 1st Place Italian Unlimited Glider Aerobatic Championship 2016
- 2nd Place at the 2017 World Games in Wrocław, Poland
- 1st Place National Glider Aerobatic Championship
- 1st Place Freestyle Championship - Milan
- 1st Place Unknowns Programs WGAC
- 2nd Place Overall World Championship 2018
- 1st Place FreeKnown Program World Glider Aerobatic Championship 2021
- 1st Place Unknown Programs World Glider Aerobatic Championship 2021
- 2nd Place Overall World Glider Aerobatic Championship 2021
