= Szymanów, Trzebnica County =

Szymanów
- Village
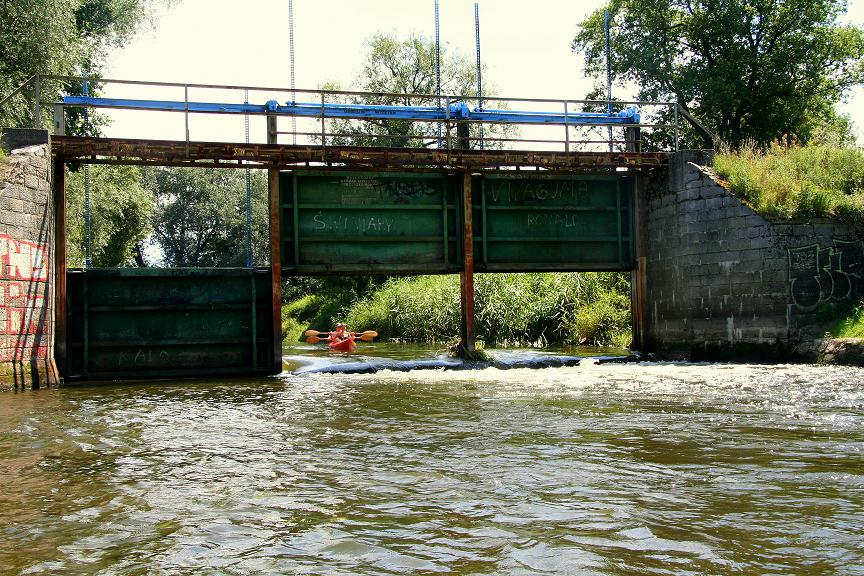

- Location within Poland
- Coordinates: 51°11′41″N 17°0′48″E
- Country: Poland
- Voivodeship: Lower Silesian
- County: Trzebnica
- Gmina: Wisznia Mała
- Elevation: 112 m (367 ft)

Szymanów (Polish: [ʂɨˈmanuf]) is a village in the administrative district of Gmina Wisznia Mała, within Trzebnica County, Lower Silesian Voivodeship, in south-western Poland.
