= National Forum of Music =

Concert hall in Wrocław, Poland

- Narodowe Forum Muzyki
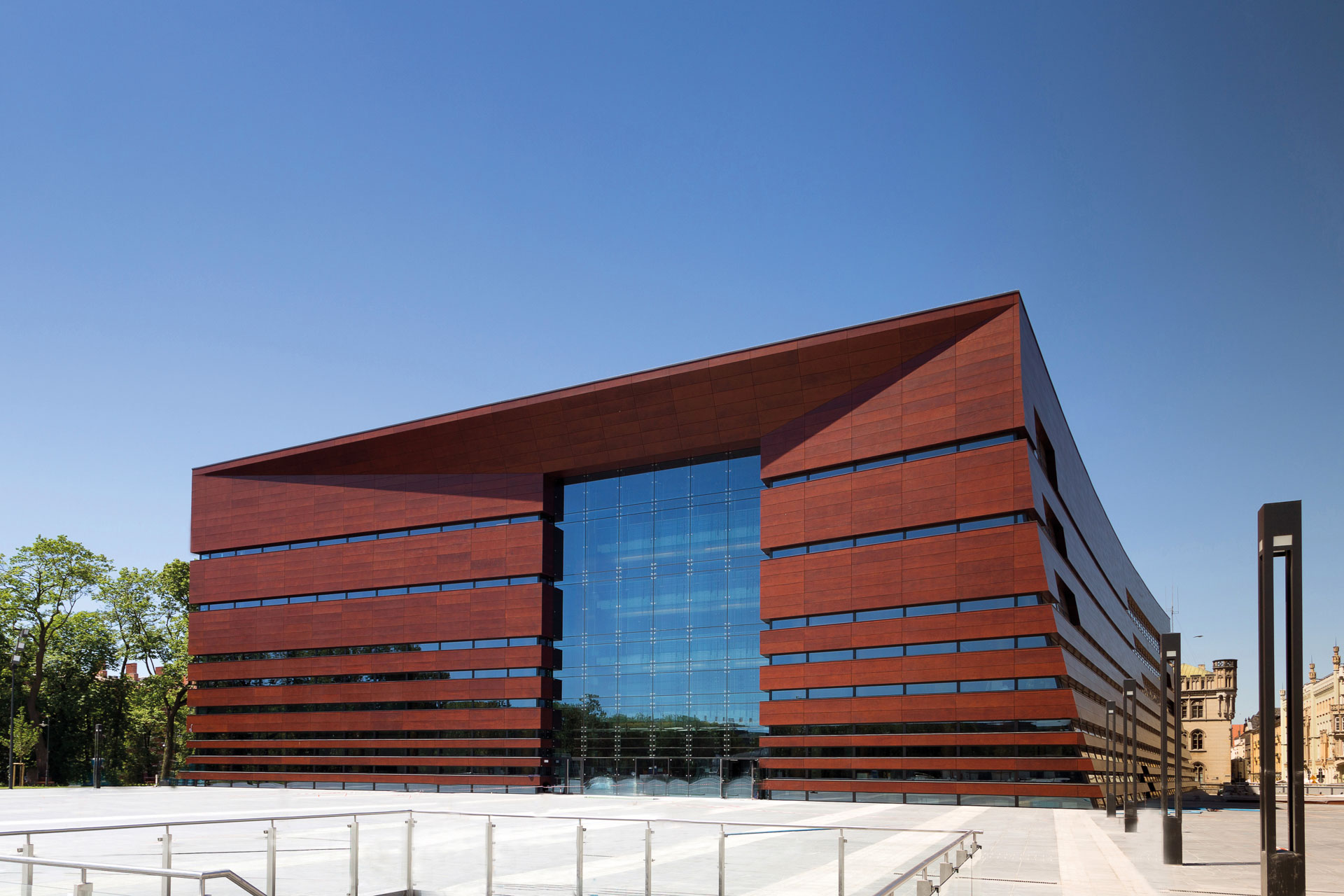
- Interactive map of National Forum of Music
- Address: pl. Wolności 1 Wrocław; Poland
- Type: Music hall

Construction
- Opened: 2015
- Years active: 2015–present
- Architect: Kuryłowicz & Associates

Website
- http://www.nfm.wroclaw.pl/

The National Forum of Music (Narodowe Forum Muzyki) or NFM is a music venue located in Wrocław, Poland. It was completed in 2015 and houses a large concert hall with 1800 seats and three chamber halls (from 250–450 seats) and is home to many major ensembles and festivals in Wrocław. The building was designed by APA Kuryłowicz & Associates. It is one of the largest and most modern music venues in Poland.

== History ==
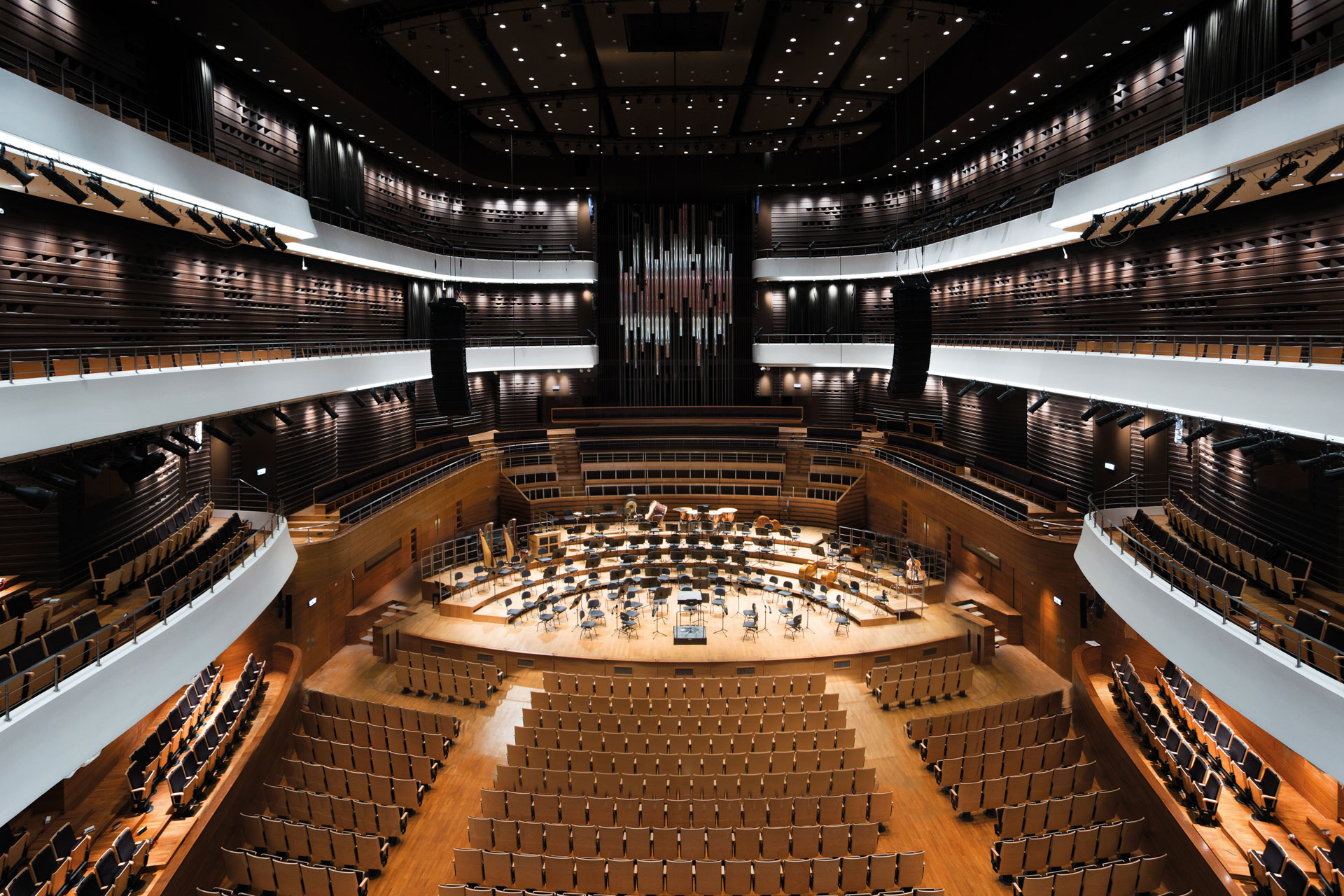
Main auditorium

The construction of the venue started in 2009 and was completed in 2015. It covers the area of 48,500 square metres and is situated in the Liberty Square in the city centre near the historic Wrocław Opera. The building consists of six floor above ground level as well as three underground floors.

The Witold Lutosławski National Forum of Music is a cultural institution that is headquartered in the building. It was created in 2014 due to a merger of two other institutions - Wratislavia Cantans International Festival of Music and the Wrocław Philharmonic. Andrzej Kosendiak, the current director of NFM, was one of the main initiators of the project to create the new venue.

The NFM organizes a wide range of educational projects for children such as Choir Academy (Singing Wrocław, Singing Poland, Polish National Youth Choir), Singing Europe, Family Philharmonic, Philharmonic for Youngsters as well as for adults e.g. Music Lovers' Choir. The NFM was one of the key cultural institutions responsible for establishing the cultural programme of Wrocław as one of co-host cities bearing the title of the European Capital of Culture in 2016.

== Events ==
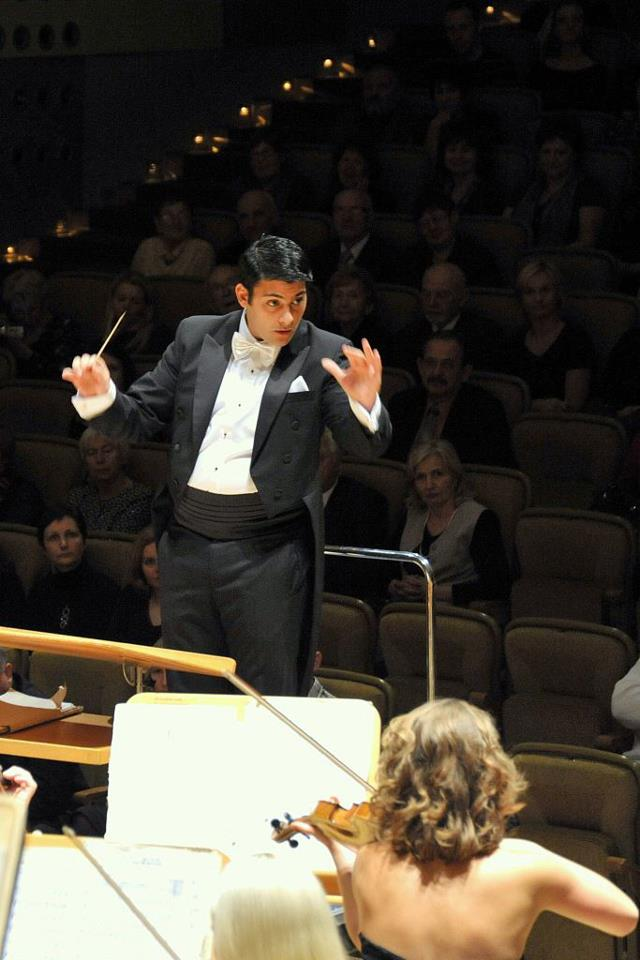
Fábio Loutfi Pereira conducting at the National Forum of Music in 2016

Presently, the National Forum of Music organizes the following national and international festivals and events:

- Wratislavia Cantans
- Jazztopad
- Musica Polonica Nova
- Musica Electronica Nova
- Forum Musicum
- Leo Festival
- Early Music Festival

== Orchestras ==
The venue is home to such orchestras and music bands as:

- NFM Wrocław Philharmonic
- NFM Leopoldinum Orchestra
- Wrocław Baroque Orchestra
- NFM Choir
- NFM Boys' Choir
- Lutosławski Quartet
- LutosAir Quintet
- NFM Ensemble
- Polish Cello Quartet
- NFM Leopoldinum String Trio
- Wrocław Baroque Ensemble
- Artrio (cooperation)
- Pakamera Quartet (cooperation)
- NFM Salon Orchestra

== See also ==
- Warsaw Philharmonic
- Sinfonia Varsovia
- NOSPR
- Szczecin Philharmonic
- Capella Cracoviensis
- Music of Poland
