= Szczytnicki Park =

Park in Wrocław, Poland

Coordinates: 51°06′50″N 17°04′54″E

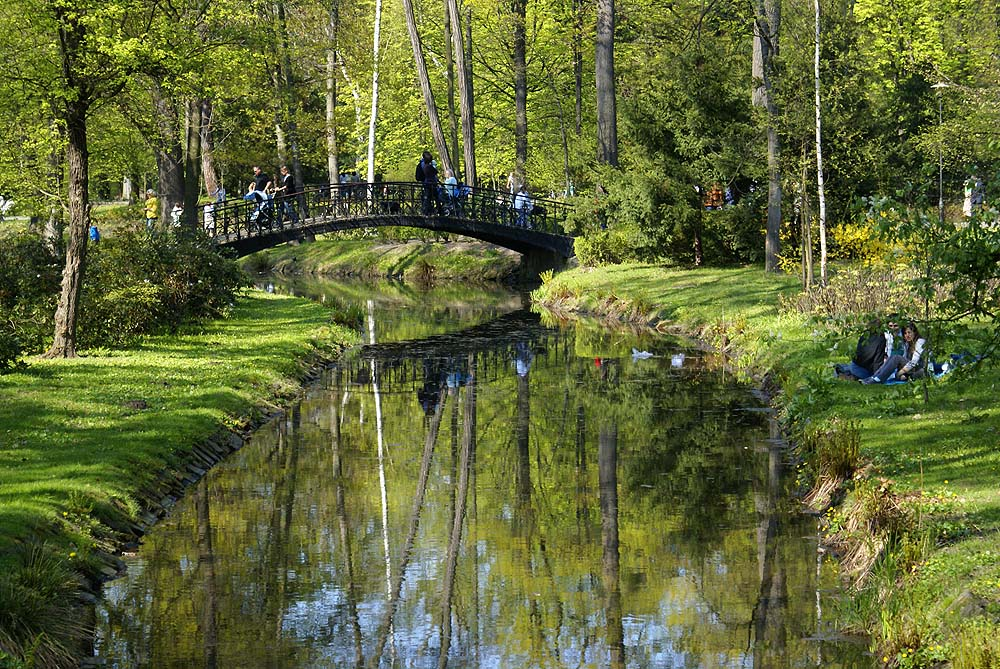
- Interactive map of Szczytnicki Park
- Type: Public park
- Location: Wrocław, Poland
- Area: 100 hectares (250 acres)
- Created: 1783

Szczytnicki Park in Wrocław, Poland is located to the east of Grunwald Square and the old Oder river, and covers approximately 10 square kilometres of land. The park, besides offering many sightseeing attractions, also has many dendrological rarities.

== History ==
The land which now constitutes the park was first mentioned in writing in 1204, when duke Henry the Bearded donated the village Stitnic to the monastery of St. Vincent, where shields were produced for the duke's forces. The village was also inhabited by fishermen and farmers. In 1318, the monks sold the village to the city council, becoming the first estate outside the city walls, called Szczytniki. In German, the village was called Scheitnig.

The forest in Szczytniki was already popular among the German inhabitants of Breslau in the 18th century. In 1783, Frederick Louis, Prince of Hohenlohe-Ingelfingen bought the terrain and established one of the first parks on the European continent in the English style. However, the park was ruined by French soldiers in an 1806 siege of the city during the Napoleonic Wars.

The park hosts a Japanese Garden, prepared for the World's Fair of 1913, restored by a Japanese foundation, partially destroyed by the 1997 flood and reconstructed. There is also a wooden church from the turn of the 17th century, originally in Stare Koźle.
