= Egypt at the 2017 World Games =

Egypt at the World Games 2017
- IOC code: EGY
- NOC: Egyptian Olympic Committee

in Wrocław, Poland 20 July 2017 – 30 July 2017
- Competitors: 1 in 1 sport

World Games appearances
- 1981; 1985; 1989; 1993; 1997; 2001; 2005; 2009; 2013; 2017; 2022; 2025

Egypt competed at the World Games 2017 in Wrocław, Poland, from 20 July 2017 to 30 July 2017.

== Competitors ==
Sports	Men	Women	Total	Events
Archery	1	0	1	1
Total	1	0	1	1

== Archery ==
Egypt has qualified at the 2017 World Games:

- Women's Individual Compound - 1 quota (Hala Elgibily)
