= Denmark at the 2017 World Games =

Denmark at the World Games 2017
- IOC code: DEN
- NOC: National Olympic Committee and Sports Confederation of Denmark

in Wrocław, Poland 20 July 2017 – 30 July 2017
- Competitors: 2 in 1 sport

World Games appearances
- 1981; 1985; 1989; 1993; 1997; 2001; 2005; 2009; 2013; 2017; 2022; 2025

Denmark competed at the World Games 2017 in Wrocław, Poland, from July 20, 2017 to July 30, 2017.

== Competitors ==
Sports	Men	Women	Total	Events
Trampoline	1	1	2	2
Total	1	1	2	2

== Gymnastic ==
=== Trampoline ===
Portugal has qualified at the 2017 World Games:

- Men's Individual Tumbling - 1 quota
- Women's Individual Tumbling - 1 quota
