= Brazil at the 2017 World Games =

- IOC code: BRA
- NOC: Brazilian Olympic Committee

in Wrocław, Poland 20 July 2017 – 30 July 2017
- Competitors: 10 in 2 sports
- Medals: Gold 0 Silver 0 Bronze 0 Total 0

World Games appearances
- 1981; 1985; 1989; 1993; 1997; 2001; 2005; 2009; 2013; 2017; 2022; 2025

Brazil competed at the 2017 World Games in Wrocław, Poland, from July 20, 2017 to July 30, 2017.

== Competitors ==
Sports	Men	Women	Mixed	Total	Events
Fistball	9	0	0	9	1
Gymnastics – aerobics	0	0	8	8	1
Gymnastics – trampoline	0	1	0	1	1
Powerlifting	0	1	0	1	1
Total	9	2	8	19	4

== Beach handball ==
Brazil won the gold medal in both the men's tournament and women's tournament.

== Fistball ==
Brazil has qualified at the 2017 World Games in the Fistball Men Team event.

== Gymnastic ==
=== Trampoline ===
Brazil has qualified at the 2017 World Games. At the 2017 World Games, she again won gold in the same category.

- Women's Individual Double Mini Trampoline - 1 quota

== Powerlifting ==
=== Equipped – Heavyweight ===
Brazil won the gold medal in the tournament through athlete Ana Castellain.
