= Australia at the 2017 World Games =

Australia at the World Games 2017
- IOC code: AUS
- NOC: Australian Olympic Committee
- Website: www.olympics.com.au

in Wrocław, Poland 20 July 2017 – 30 July 2017
- Competitors: 51 in 5 sports
- Flag bearer: Sarah Wentworth

World Games appearances
- 1981; 1985; 1989; 1993; 1997; 2001; 2005; 2009; 2013; 2017; 2022; 2025

Australia competed at the World Games 2017 in Wrocław, Poland, from 20 July 2017 to 30 July 2017.

== Competitors ==
Sports	Men	Women	Total	Events
Korfball	7	7	14	1
Flying Disc	7	7	14	1
Fistball	0	18	18	1
Rhythmic Gymnastics	0	1	1	1
Trampoline	3	1	4	3
Total	17	34	51	7

== Gymnastic ==
=== Rhythmic Gymnastics ===
Australia has qualified at the 2017 World Games:

- Women's individual event - 1 quota

=== Trampoline ===
Australia has qualified at the 2017 World Games:

- Men's Individual Double Mini Trampoline - 1 quota
- Men's Synchronized Trampoline - 1 quota
- Women's Individual Double Mini Trampoline - 1 quota

== Karate ==
Australia competed in karate.

== Korfball ==
Australia has qualified at the 2017 World Games in the Korfball Mixed Team event.

== Fistball ==
Australia has qualified at the 2017 World Games in the Fistball Men Team event.

== Muaythai ==
Australia has qualified at the 2017 World Games:

- Women's -75 kg – (Anita Bcom)

== Karate ==
Australia has qualified at the 2017 World Games:

- Men's Kumite -60 kg – (Tsuneari Yahiro)
- Women's Kumite -50 kg – (Maria Alexiadis)
- Women's Kumite -55 kg – (T'Meika Knapp)
- Women's Kumite -61 kg – (Kristina Mah)
- Women's Kumite +68 kg - (Evgeniya Podborodnikova)
