= Hungary at the 2017 World Games =

- IOC code: HUN

in Wrocław, Poland 20 July 2017 – 30 July 2017
- Medals Ranked 11th: Gold 6 Silver 4 Bronze 4 Total 14

World Games appearances
- 1981; 1985; 1989; 1993; 1997; 2001; 2005; 2009; 2013; 2017; 2022; 2025

Hungary competed at the 2017 World Games held in Wrocław, Poland.

== Medalists ==
Medal	Name	Sport	Event
Gold	Ferenc Tóth	Air sports	Glider aerobatics
Gold	Kristó Szűcs	Ju-jitsu	Men's ne-waza open
Silver	Kristó Szűcs	Ju-jitsu	Men's ne-waza 94 kg

== Air sports ==
Ferenc Tóth won the gold medal in the glider aerobatics event.

== Ju-jitsu ==
Kristó Szűcs won the gold medal in the men's ne-waza open and the silver medal in the men's ne-waza 94 kg event.
