= Sweden at the 2017 World Games =

Sweden at the World Games 2017
- IOC code: SWE
- NOC: Swedish Olympic Committee

in Wrocław, Poland 20 July 2017 – 30 July 2017
- Competitors: 16 in 5 sports
- Medals: Gold 2 Silver Bronze 1 Total 3

World Games appearances
- 1981; 1985; 1989; 1993; 1997; 2001; 2005; 2009; 2013; 2017; 2022; 2025

Sweden competed at the World Games 2017 in Wrocław, Poland, from July 20, 2017, to July 30, 2017.

== Competitors ==
Sports	Men	Women	Total	Events
Archery	2	3	5	2
Muaythai	0	4	4	1
Trampoline	0	1	1	1
Skydiving	1	0	1	1
Orienteering	3	2	5	3
Total	6	10	16	8

== Archery ==
=== Field archery ===
Sweden has qualified at the 2017 World Games:

- Men's Barebow – 2 quotas (Erik Jonsson, Martin Ottosson)
- Women's Barebow – 1 quota (Lina Bjorklund)
- Men's Recurve – 1 quota (Jonathan Andersson)
- Women's Recurve – 1 quota (Elin Kattstrom)

== Gymnastic ==
=== Trampoline ===
Sweden has qualified at the 2017 World Games:

- Women's Individual Double Mini Trampoline - 1 quota

== Muaythai ==
Sweden has qualified at the 2017 World Games:

- Women's -54 kg – Sofia Olofsson
- Women's -57 kg – Patricia Axling
- Women's -67 kg – Beata Malecki
- Women's -71 kg – Anna Strandberg

== Orienteering ==
- Sprint
- Middle distance
- Sprint relay
