= France at the 2017 World Games =

France at the World Games 2017
- IOC code: FRA
- NOC: French Olympic Committee

in Wrocław, Poland 20 July 2017 – 30 July 2017
- Competitors: 9 in 5 sports

World Games appearances
- 1981; 1985; 1989; 1993; 1997; 2001; 2005; 2009; 2013; 2017; 2022; 2025

France competed at the 2017 World Games in Wrocław, Poland, from July 20, 2017 to July, 30 2017.

== Competitors ==
Sports	Men	Women	Total	Events
Boules sports	2	1	3	3
Muaythai	1	0	1	1
Rhythmic gymnastics	0	1	1	1
Sport climbing	0	1	1	1
Trampoline	2	1	2	2
Total	5	4	9	8

== Boules sports ==
France has qualified at the 2017 World Games:

- Petanque Women's Singles Precision Shooting - 1 quota
- Lyonnaise Men's Singles Precision Shooting - 1 quota
- Lyonnaise Men's Singles Progressive Shooting - 1 quota

== Gymnastic ==
=== Rhythmic Gymnastics ===
France has qualified at the 2017 World Games:

- Women's individual event - 1 quota

=== Trampoline ===
Belarus has qualified at the 2017 World Games:

- Men's Synchronized Trampoline - 1 quota
- Women's Individual Tumbling - 1 quota

== Karate ==
France has qualified at the 2017 World Games:

- Men's Kata - (Vu Duc Minh Dack)
- Men's Kumite -60 kg (Sofiane Agoudjil)
- Men's Kumite -67 kg (Steven Da Costa)
- Women's Kata - (Sandy Scordo)
- Women's Kumite -50 kg (Alexandra Recchia)
- Women's Kumite -55 kg (Emily Thouy)
- Women's Kumite -61 kg (Lucie Ignace)
- Women's Kumite +68 kg (Anne-Laure Florentin)

== Muaythai ==
France has qualified at the 2017 World Games:

- Men's -75kg - 1 quota place (Olivier Ngoto)

== Sport climbing ==
France has qualified at the 2017 World Games:

- Women's Bouldering - Anouck Jaubert
