= Italy at the 2017 World Games =

Italy at the World Games 2017
- IOC code: ITA
- NOC: Italian Olympic Committee

in Wrocław, Poland 20 July 2017 – 30 July 2017
- Competitors: 126
- Medals Ranked 2nd: Gold 14 Silver 10 Bronze 10 Total 34

World Games appearances (overview)
- 1981; 1985; 1989; 1993; 1997; 2001; 2005; 2009; 2013; 2017; 2022; 2025

Italy competed at the World Games 2017 in Wrocław, Poland, from 20 July 2017 to 30 July 2017.

== Competitors ==
Sports	Men	Women	Total	Events
Acrobatic gymnastic	3	2	5	2
Air sports	3	0	3	2
Archery	2	3	5	5
Boules sport	6	4	10	11
Bowling	2	0	2	2
Canoe polo	8	8	16	2
Dance sport	3	3	6	3
Fin swimming	5	4	4	7
Indoor rowing	2	0	2	2
Ju-jitsu	2	0	2	2
Karate	4	3	7	6
Kickboxing	0	2	2	2
Total	39	30	69	46

== Aerobic gymnastic ==
=== Mixed ===
Athlete	Event	Qualifications		Final	
Athlete	Event	Points	Rank	Points	Rank
Emanuele Caponera; Michela Castoldi; Paolo Conti; Davide Donati; Sara Natella	Mixed group	19.355	5th	NQ	NQ
Michela Castoldi; Davide Donati	Mixed pair	20.850	6th	NQ	NQ

== Air sports ==
=== Men ===
Athlete	Event	Final	
Athlete	Event	Points	Rank
Luca Bertossio	Glider Aerobatics	8977.70	2nd
Armando Fattoruso	Parachuting - Canopy Piloting	227.000	17th
Mario Fattoruso	Parachuting - Canopy Piloting	240.000	22nd

== Archery ==
=== Men ===
Athlete	Event	Ranking round		Pool	Round of 32	Round of 16	Quarterfinals	Semifinals	Final / BM	
Athlete	Event	Score	Seed	Opposition Score	Opposition Score	Opposition Score	Opposition Score	Opposition Score	Opposition Score	Rank
Giuseppe Seimandi	Barebow			—N/a						
Amedeo Tonelli	Recurve			—N/a						

=== Women ===
Athlete	Event	Ranking round		Pool	Round of 32	Round of 16	Quarterfinals	Semifinals	Final / BM	
Athlete	Event	Score	Seed	Opposition Score	Opposition Score	Opposition Score	Opposition Score	Opposition Score	Opposition Score	Rank
Cinzia Nogliazi	Barebow			—N/a						
Jessica Tomasi	Compound									
Marcella Tonioli	Recurve			—N/a						

== Boules sports ==
=== Men Singles ===
Athlete	Event	Qualification	Pool				Semifinals	Final / BM	
Athlete	Event	Opposition Score	Opposition Score	Opposition Score	Opposition Score	Rank	Opposition Score	Opposition Score	Rank
Davide Manolino	Lyonnaise Precision		—N/a						
Davide Manolino	Lyonnaise Progressive		—N/a						
Mauro Roggero	Lyonnaise Progressive		—N/a						
Fabio Dutto	Petanque Precision Shooting		—N/a						
Diego Rizzi	Petanque Precision Shooting		—N/a						
Giuliano Di Nicola	Raffa	—N/a							
Gianluca Formicone	Raffa	—N/a							

=== Men's Doubles ===
Athlete	Event	Pool				Semifinals	Final / BM	
Athlete	Event	Opposition Score	Opposition Score	Opposition Score	Rank	Opposition Score	Opposition Score	Rank
Fabio Dutto; Diego Rizzi	Petanque							
Giuliano Di Nicola; Gianluca Formicone	Raffa							

=== Women Singles ===
Athlete	Event	Qualification	Pool				Semifinals	Final / BM	
Athlete	Event	Opposition Score	Opposition Score	Opposition Score	Opposition Score	Rank	Opposition Score	Opposition Score	Rank
Serena Travisi	Lyonnaise Precision		—N/a						
Caterina Venturini	Lyonnaise Precision		—N/a						
Serena Traversa	Lyonnaise Progressive	—N/a							
Marina Braconi	Lyonnaise Progressive	—N/a							
Elisa Luccarini	Lyonnaise Progressive	—N/a							

=== Women's Doubles ===
Athlete	Event	Pool				Semifinals	Final / BM	
Athlete	Event	Opposition Score	Opposition Score	Opposition Score	Rank	Opposition Score	Opposition Score	Rank
Elisa Luccarini; Marina Braconi	Raffa							

== Bowling ==
=== Men's Singles ===
Athlete	Event	Ranking round		Qualification	Round of 16	Quarterfinals	Semifinals	Final / BM	
Athlete	Event	Score	Seed	Opposition Score	Opposition Score	Opposition Score	Opposition Score	Opposition Score	Rank
Massimiliano Celli	Singles								
Alessandro Spada	Singles								

=== Men's Doubles ===
Athlete	Event	Pool				Quarterfinals	Semifinals	Final / BM
Athlete	Event	Opposition Score	Opposition Score	Opposition Score	Rank	Opposition Score	Opposition Score	Rank
Massimiliano Celli; Alessandro Spada	Doubles							

== Canoe polo ==
=== Women's tournament ===
Team roster

- Martina Anastasi
- Roberta Catania
- Silvia Gogoni
- Maddalena Lago
- Flavia Landolina
- Ada Prestipino
- Maria Anna Szczepanska
- Chiara Trevisan

Pos	Team	Pld	W	D	L	GF	GA	GD	Pts	Qualification
1	Canada	0	0	0	0	0	0	0	0	Semifinals
2	France	0	0	0	0	0	0	0	0	Semifinals
3	Germany	0	0	0	0	0	0	0	0	Semifinals
4	Italy	0	0	0	0	0	0	0	0	Semifinals
5	Netherlands	0	0	0	0	0	0	0	0	
6	New Zealand	0	0	0	0	0	0	0	0	
7	Poland	0	0	0	0	0	0	0	0	

Updated to match(es) played on 17 July 2017. Source:
Rules for classification: 1) points; 2) head-to-head points; 3) head-to-head goal difference; 4) head-to-head number of goals scored; 5) Goal difference.

28 July 2017; 08:00	Italy	–	New Zealand	Woroclaw

28 July 2017; 12:50	France	–	Italy	Woroclaw

28 July 2017; 19:15	Germany	–	Italy	Woroclaw

29 July 2017; 10:55	Italy	–	Poland	Woroclaw

29 July 2017; 14:25	Netherlands	–	Italy	Woroclaw

29 July 2017; 17:20	Italy	–	Canada	Woroclaw

=== Men's tournament ===
Team roster

- Luca Bellini
- Andrea Bertellini
- Edoarda Corvaia
- Gianluca Distefano
- Gianmarco Emanuele
- Jan Erik Haack
- Marco Porzio
- Andrea Romano

Pos	Team	Pld	W	D	L	GF	GA	GD	Pts	Qualification
1	France	0	0	0	0	0	0	0	0	Semifinals
2	Germany	0	0	0	0	0	0	0	0	Semifinals
3	Italy	0	0	0	0	0	0	0	0	Semifinals
4	New Zealand	0	0	0	0	0	0	0	0	Semifinals
5	Poland	0	0	0	0	0	0	0	0	
6	Spain	0	0	0	0	0	0	0	0	
7	Chinese Taipei	0	0	0	0	0	0	0	0	

Updated to match(es) played on 18 July 2017. Source:
Rules for classification: 1) points; 2) head-to-head points; 3) head-to-head goal difference; 4) head-to-head number of goals scored; 5) Goal difference.

28 July 2017; 9:55	Italy	–	New Zealand	Woroclaw

28 July 2017; 13:25	Italy	–	Germany	Woroclaw

28 July 2017; 16:55	Italy	–	Spain	Woroclaw

29 July 2017; 8:00	Italy	–	Chinese Taipei	Woroclaw

29 July 2017; 11:30	Italy	–	France	Woroclaw

29 July 2017; 15:00	Italy	–	Poland	Woroclaw

== Dance sports ==
Athlete	Event	First Round		Redance		Semifinals		Final
Athlete	Event	Points	Rank	Points	Rank	Opponent Score	Opponent Score	Rank
Francesco Galuppo; Debora Pacini	Standard							
Serena Maso; Simone Sanfilippo	Salsa							
Roberta Benedetti; Giacomo Lazzarini	Latin							

== Fin swimming ==
=== Men ===
Athlete	Event	Final	
Athlete	Event	Points	Rank
Cesare Fumarola	Surface 100m		
Kevin Zanardi	Surface 200m		
Stefano Frigni	Surface 200m		
Stefano Frigni	Surface 400m		
Davide De Ceglie	Surface 400m		
Stefano Figni; Stefano Figni; Andrea Nava; Kevin Zanardi	Surface Relay 4 × 100 m		

=== Women ===
Athlete	Event	Final	
Athlete	Event	Points	Rank
Erica Barbon	Surface 200m		
Erica Barbon	Surface 400m		
Eugenia Alicco; Erica Barbon; Silvia Baroncini; Isabella Brambila	Surface Relay 4 × 100 m		

== Indoor rowing ==
=== Men ===
Athlete	Event	Final	
Athlete	Event	Points	Rank
Leonardo Bava	Lightweight 2000m		
Antonio Zonta	Openweight 500m		

== Gymnastic ==
=== Rhythmic gymnastics ===
Italy has qualified at the 2017 World Games:

- Women's individual event - 1 quota

== Ju-Jitsu ==
=== Men ===
Athlete	Event	Pool				Semifinals	Final / BM	
Athlete	Event	Opposition Score	Opposition Score	Opposition Score	Rank	Opposition Score	Opposition Score	Rank
Bruno Ivan Tomasetti	94 kg Ne-Waza							
Stefano De Caro; Raffaele Luizza	Men's Duo							

=== Women ===
Athlete	Event	Pool				Semifinals	Final / BM	
Athlete	Event	Opposition Score	Opposition Score	Opposition Score	Rank	Opposition Score	Opposition Score	Rank
Jessica Scricciolo	55 kg Fighting							
Jessica Scricciolo	55 kg Ne-Waza							
Annalisa Cavaretta	62 kg Fighting							

=== Mixed ===
Athlete	Event	Pool				Semifinals	Final / BM	
Athlete	Event	Opposition Score	Opposition Score	Opposition Score	Rank	Opposition Score	Opposition Score	Rank
Michele Valleri; Sara Paganini	55 kg Fighting							

== Karate ==
=== Men ===
Athlete	Event	Pool				Semifinals	Final / BM	
Athlete	Event	Opposition Score	Opposition Score	Opposition Score	Rank	Opposition Score	Opposition Score	Rank
Mattia Busato	Kata							

=== Women ===
Athlete	Event	Pool				Semifinals	Final / BM	
Athlete	Event	Opposition Score	Opposition Score	Opposition Score	Rank	Opposition Score	Opposition Score	Rank
Sara Cardin	Kumite 55 kg							

== Kickboxing ==
=== Women ===
Athlete	Event	Quarterfinals	Semifinals	Final / BM	
Athlete	Event	Opposition Score	Opposition Score	Opposition Score	Rank
Amal Whabay	K1 56 kg				
Cristina Caruso	K1 65 kg				
