= Poland at the 2017 World Games =

Poland at the World Games 2017
- IOC code: POL
- NOC: Polish Olympic Committee

in Wrocław, Poland 20 July 2017 – 30 July 2017
- Competitors: 72 in 7 sports
- Medals Ranked 13th: Gold 5 Silver 6 Bronze 9 Total 20

World Games appearances
- 1981; 1985; 1989; 1993; 1997; 2001; 2005; 2009; 2013; 2017; 2022; 2025

Poland hosted the World Games 2017 in Wrocław, Poland, from July 20, 2017 to July, 30 2017.

== Medalists ==
Medal	Name	Sport	Event	Date
Gold	Wojciech Bogdal	Air sports	Paramotor Slalom	July 23
Gold	Jarosław Olech	Powerlifting	Men's Middleweight	July 25
Gold	Jędrzej Loska	Ju-jitsu	Men's 62kg Ne-Waza	July 28
Gold	Tomasz Szewczak	Ju-jitsu	Men's 94kg Fighting	July 29
Gold	Anna Miadzielec; Jacek Tarczyło	Dancesport	Rock 'n' Roll	July 29
Silver	Alicja Tchórz	Lifesaving	Women's 200m Obstacle Swim	July 21
Silver	Cezary Kępa; Wojciech Kotowski; Bartosz Makowski; Adam Dubiel	Lifesaving	Men's Team 4x50 Obstacle Relay	July 21
Silver	Wojciech Kotowski; Cezary Kępa; Bartosz Stanielewicz; Adam Dubiel	Lifesaving	Men's Team 4x25 Manikin Relay	July 22
Silver	Maciej Polok	Ju-jitsu	Men's 69kg Ne-Waza	July 28
Silver	Rafał Riss	Ju-jitsu	Men's +94kg Fighting	July 29
Silver	Łukasz Radosz	Muaythai	Men's 91kg	July 30
Bronze	Magdalena Macios	Sumo	Women's Lightweight	July 22
Bronze	Paweł Wojda	Sumo	Men's Lightweight	July 22
Bronze	Alicja Tchórz; Karolina Faszczewska; Dominika Kossakowska; Anna Nocoń	Lifesaving	Women's Team 4x50 Medley Relay	July 22
Bronze	Marcin Bernat	Air sports	Paramotor Slalom	July 23
Bronze	Michał Bąbos	Karate	Men's Kumite +84kg	July 26
Bronze	Maciej Kozak	Ju-jitsu	Men's 77kg Ne-Waza	July 28
Bronze	Emilia Maćkowiak	Ju-jitsu	Women's Open Ne-Waza	July 29
Bronze	Magdalena Giec; Maciej Kozak; Jędrzej Loska; Emilia Maćkowiak; Tomasz Szewczak; Marta Walotek	Ju-jitsu	Mixed National Team Competition	July 29
Bronze	Oskar Siegert	Muaythai	Men's 63.5kg	July 30

== Competitors ==
Sports	Men	Women	Total	Events
American football	22	0	22	1
Lacrosse	0	18	18	1
Korfball	7	7	14	1
Rhythmic Gymnastics	0	1	1	1
Sport Climbing	3	3	6	6
Trampoline	2	0	2	1
Total	54	29	63	11

== American Football ==
As the host nation, Poland has received a guaranteed place for Men competition.

== Gymnastic ==
=== Rhythmic Gymnastics ===
Poland has qualified at the 2017 World Games:

- Women's individual event - Anna Czarniecka

=== Trampoline ===
Poland has qualified at the 2017 World Games:

- Men's Synchronized Trampoline - 1 quota

== Korfball ==
Poland has qualified at the 2017 World Games in the Korfball Mixed Team event.

== Lacrosse ==
Poland has qualified at the 2017 World Games in the Fistball Men Team event.

== Sport Climbing ==
Poland has qualified at the 2017 World Games:

- Men's Bouldering - 1 quota
- Men's Lead - 1 quota
- Men's Speed - 1 quota
- Women's Bouldering - 1 quota
- Women's Lead - 1 quota
- Women's Speed - 1 quota
