= Kickboxing at the 2017 World Games =

- Venue: Orbita Hall
- Dates: 26–27 July 2017
- Competitors: 95 from 31 nations

The kickboxing event at the World Games 2017 was held at the Orbita Hall in Poland. For the first time, kickboxing was included in the World Games 2017 as an invitational sport.

== Events ==
- Light welterweight (60–63.5 kg)
- Welterweight (63.5–67 kg)
- Light middleweight (67–71 kg)
- Middleweight (71–75 kg)
- Light heavyweight (75–81 kg)
- Cruiserweight (81–86 kg)
- Heavyweight (86–91 kg)
- Super heavyweight (+91 kg)

== Qualifying criteria ==
Qualifications for the World Games 2017 were held at the WAKO Continental Championships that were organized by each WAKO Continental Federation/ Confederation as follows:

1. WAKO African Championships in Morocco (December 2016)
2. WAKO Pan American Championships (27 -30 October 2016)
3. WAKO European Championships (22-29 October 2016)
4. WAKO Asian Championships (1-9 August 2015) and (October 2016)

To ensure that all Continents will be represented by the best athletes in each weight class, athletes will be selected as follows:

1. From WAKO Europe: 4 athletes.
2. From WAKO Pan America: 1 athletes.
3. From WAKO Asia: 1 athlete
4. From WAKO Africa: 1 athletes

The remaining one place in each weight class will be split evenly to 6/6 as follows:

1. WAKO Asia: 6 Weight classes
2. WAKO Pan America: 6 Weight classes.

== Qualification ==
The following tournaments were used as qualification tournaments for kickboxing at the 2017 World games:

Africa

The African Kickboxing Championships 2016 (K1 Rules style) which was held from the 21 to 25 December 2016 in Rabat, Morocco, served as qualification of African Kickboxing Confederation Athletes for 2017 World Games.

Asia

The 2015 and 2016 Asian Kickboxing Championships acted consecutively, as stage one and stage two for the Asian qualifications of the 2017 World games. Stage one was held from the 1st till the 9th of August 2015 in Pune, India.

The 2016 Asian Kickboxing Championships K1 Rules (stage two of the qualifications) were held over three days in Cheongju, Korea during October 2016, by the Asian Kickboxing Confederation (WAKO Asia) on the occasion of the Cheongju World Martial Arts Masterships with the participation of 16 member federations which competed in 12 weight categories.

Europe

The European championships which was held from the 23 to 30 October 2016 in Maribor, Slovenia, was part of the K1 WAKO qualifying system for The World Games 2017.

Pan America

The Pan American championships were held in Cancun, Mexico, from October 26 to 29, 2016. The event was the Pan American qualifications for the World Games organized by the International World Games Association (IWGA) in July 2017, in Wrocław, Poland. The American Continent has the right for 18 vacancies in 12 official categories at K1 Rules (8 for men and 4 for women) for the IWGA World Games 2017.

== Venue ==
The Orbita Hall located in Wrocław hosted martial arts during The World Games 2017.

== Participating nations ==
- Austria (2)
- Bosnia and Herzegovina (1)
- Brazil (5)
- Bulgaria (2)
- Canada (2)
- China (1)
- Croatia (4)
- Czech Republic (2)
- France (1)
- Great Britain (1)
- Iran (6)
- Israel (1)
- Italy (3)
- Jordan (2)
- Kazakhstan (2)
- Kyrgyzstan (1)
- Mauritius (1)
- Mexico (2)
- Moldova (4)
- Morocco (8)
- Netherlands (1)
- Poland (11)
- Russia (7)
- Serbia (6)
- Slovakia (4)
- Sweden (1)
- Tajikistan (1)
- Tunisia (1)
- Turkey (3)
- Ukraine (5)
- United States (4)

== Medalists ==
=== Men ===
Event	Gold	Silver	Bronze
Light welterweight −63.5 kg	Ukraine; Orfan Sananzade	Serbia; Aleksandar Konovalov	Croatia; Muhamet Deskaj
Welterweight −67 kg	Serbia; Slobodan Mijailović	Canada; Jason Hinds	Poland; Wojciech Kazieczko
Light middleweight −71 kg	Ukraine; Vitalii Dubina	Bulgaria; Bogdan Shumarov	Israel; Itai Gershon
Middleweight −75 kg	France; Zakaria Laaouatni	Poland; Michał Ronkiewicz	Russia; Datsi Datsiev
Light heavyweight −81 kg	Serbia; Aleksandar Menković	Bulgaria; Aleksandar Petrov	United States; Omar Boyd
Cruiserweight −86 kg	Poland; Dawid Kasperski	Bosnia and Herzegovina; Mesud Selimović	Iran; Omid Nosrati
Heavyweight −91 kg	Russia; Igor Darmeshkin	Poland; Mateusz Pluta	Moldova; Pavel Voronin
Super heavyweight +91 kg	Turkey; Hamdi Saygılı	Ukraine; Roman Holovatiuk	Poland; Michał Turyński

=== Women ===
Event	Gold	Silver	Bronze
−52 kg	Russia; Anna Poskrebysheva	Slovakia; Monika Chochlíková	China; Tam Si Long
−56 kg	Czech Republic; Sandra Mašková	Turkey; Seda Duygu Aygün	Poland; Małgorzata Dymus
−60 kg	Poland; Marta Waliczek	Mexico; Melissa Martínez Aceves	Morocco; Nabila Tabit
−65 kg	Netherlands; Sarel de Jong	Serbia; Teodora Manić	Slovakia; Veronika Cmárová

== Medal table ==
Rank	Nation	Gold	Silver	Bronze	Total
1	Poland	2	2	3	7
2	Serbia	2	2	0	4
3	Ukraine	2	1	0	3
4	Russia	2	0	1	3
5	Turkey	1	1	0	2
6	Czech Republic	1	0	0	1
6	France	1	0	0	1
6	Netherlands	1	0	0	1
9	Bulgaria	0	2	0	2
10	Slovakia	0	1	1	2
11	Bosnia and Herzegovina	0	1	0	1
11	Canada	0	1	0	1
11	Mexico	0	1	0	1
14	China	0	0	1	1
14	Croatia	0	0	1	1
14	Iran	0	0	1	1
14	Israel	0	0	1	1
14	Moldova	0	0	1	1
14	Morocco	0	0	1	1
14	United States	0	0	1	1
Totals (20 entries)		12	12	12	36
