= Dancesport at the 2017 World Games =

- Venue: Centennial Hall
- Dates: 28–29 July 2017
- No. of events: 4
- Competitors: 140 from 38 nations

The dancesport competition at the 2017 World Games took place from July 28 to July 29, in Wrocław in Poland, at the Centennial Hall.

== Participating nations ==
- Australia (4)
- Austria (4)
- Belarus (2)
- Brazil (2)
- Canada (2)
- China (4)
- Colombia (4)
- Czech Republic (8)
- Denmark (2)
- Ecuador (4)
- Estonia (2)
- France (6)
- Germany (4)
- Hungary (6)
- India (2)
- Israel (4)
- Italy (6)
- Japan (4)
- Kazakhstan (2)
- Kyrgyzstan (2)
- Latvia (2)
- Lithuania (4)
- Moldova (4)
- Norway (4)
- Peru (2)
- Poland (6)
- Portugal (2)
- Romania (4)
- Russia (6)
- Senegal (2)
- Slovakia (6)
- Slovenia (2)
- South Korea (4)
- Spain (6)
- Switzerland (2)
- Thailand (2)
- Ukraine (2)
- United States (6)

== Medal table ==
Rank	Nation	Gold	Silver	Bronze	Total
1	Colombia	1	1	0	2
2	Germany	1	0	1	2
3	Moldova	1	0	0	1
3	Poland	1	0	0	1
5	Russia	0	3	0	3
6	France	0	0	1	1
6	Italy	0	0	1	1
6	Lithuania	0	0	1	1
Totals (8 entries)		4	4	4	12

== Events ==
Event	Gold	Silver	Bronze
Standard	Germany; Benedetto Ferruggia; Claudia Köhler	Russia; Dmitry Zharkov; Olga Kulikova	Lithuania; Evaldas Sodeika; Ieva Žukauskaitė
Latin	Moldova; Gabriele Goffredo; Anna Matus	Russia; Armen Tsaturyan; Svetlana Gudyno	France; Charles-Guillaume Schmitt; Elena Salikhova
Rock'n'Roll	Poland; Jacek Tarczyło; Anna Miadzielec	Russia; Konstantin Chistikov; Ksenia Osnovina	Germany; Tobias Bludau; Michelle Uhl
Salsa	Colombia; Stevens Rebolledo; Yinessa Ortega	Colombia; Yefersson Benjumea; Adriana Avila	Italy; Simone Sanfilippo; Serena Maso
