= Boules sports at the 2017 World Games – Men's lyonnaise progressive =

Boules sports - Men's Lyonnaise Progressive at the 2017 World Games
- Venue: Centennial Hall, Wrocław, Poland
- Date: 22 July 2017
- Competitors: 7 from 7 nations

Medalists
gold medal	(France) Guillaume Abelfo
silver medal	(Slovenia) Anže Petrič
bronze medal	(China) Li Panpan

The men's lyonnaise progressive competition in boules sports at the 2017 World Games took place on 22 July 2017 at the Centennial Hall in Wrocław, Poland.

== Competition format ==
A total of 8 athletes entered the competition. Due to heavy rain after qualifications rest of the competition was cancelled. Qualification results has been recognized as final results.

== Results ==
=== Qualification ===
Rank	Athlete	Nation	Round 1	Round 2	Result	Note
1st place, gold medalist(s)	Guillaume Abelfo	France	40	44	84	Q
2nd place, silver medalist(s)	Anže Petrič	Slovenia	41	43	84	Q
3rd place, bronze medalist(s)	Li Panpan	China	38	41	79	Q
4	Mauro Roggero	Italy	38	37	75	Q
5	Santo Junior Pascuzzi	Australia	25	31	56	
6	Franco Barbano Arenas	Chile	21	32	53	
7	Alexandre Trichard	Monaco	27	24	51	
