= Ju-jitsu at the 2017 World Games – Men's fighting 69 kg =

Men's fighting 69 kg at the 2017 World Games
- Venue: GEM Sports Complex
- Date: 29 July 2017
- Competitors: 6 from 6 nations

Medalists
1st place, gold medalist(s)		(Netherlands) Boy Vogelzang
2nd place, silver medalist(s)		(Russia) Pavel Korzhavykh
3rd place, bronze medalist(s)		(Mexico) Eduardo Alberto Gutiérrez Cortés

The men's fighting 69 kg competition in ju-jitsu at the 2017 World Games took place on 29 July 2017 at the GEM Sports Complex in Wrocław, Poland.

== Results ==
=== Elimination round ===
==== Group A ====
Rank	Athlete	B	W	L	Pts	Score
1	Pavel Korzhavykh (RUS)	2	2	0	100–0	+100
2	Tim Toplak (SLO)	2	1	1	14–50	–36
3	Rayan Proag (MRI)	2	0	2	0–64	–64

	Score	
Pavel Korzhavykh (RUS)	50–0	Tim Toplak (SLO)
Pavel Korzhavykh (RUS)	50–0	Rayan Proag (MRI)
Tim Toplak (SLO)	14–0	Rayan Proag (MRI)

==== Group B ====
Rank	Athlete	B	W	L	Pts	Score
1	Boy Vogelzang (NED)	2	2	0	100–0	+100
2	Eduardo Alberto Gutiérrez Cortés (MEX)	2	1	1	7–50	–43
3	Miloš Kovačević (MNE)	2	0	2	6–50	–42

	Score	
Miloš Kovačević (MNE)	0–50	Boy Vogelzang (NED)
Miloš Kovačević (MNE)	6–7	Eduardo Alberto Gutiérrez Cortés (MEX)
Boy Vogelzang (NED)	50–0	Eduardo Alberto Gutiérrez Cortés (MEX)

=== Finals ===
Semifinals
Pavel Korzhavykh (RUS)	17
Eduardo Alberto Gutiérrez Cortés (MEX)	0
Boy Vogelzang (NED)	8
Tim Toplak (SLO)	2

Final
Pavel Korzhavykh (RUS)	6
Boy Vogelzang (NED)	8
Third place
Eduardo Alberto Gutiérrez Cortés (MEX)	6
Tim Toplak (SLO)	3
