= Ju-jitsu at the 2017 World Games – Men's fighting 94 kg =

Men's fighting 94 kg at the 2017 World Games
- Venue: GEM Sports Complex
- Date: 29 July 2017
- Competitors: 6 from 6 nations

Medalists
1st place, gold medalist(s)		(Poland) Tomasz Szewczak
2nd place, silver medalist(s)		(Iran) Mohsen Hamid Aghchay
3rd place, bronze medalist(s)		(Slovenia) Benjamin Lah

The men's fighting 94 kg competition in ju-jitsu at the 2017 World Games took place on 29 July 2017 at the GEM Sports Complex in Wrocław, Poland.

== Results ==
=== Elimination round ===
==== Group A ====
Rank	Athlete	B	W	L	Pts	Score
1	Mathias Brix Willard (DEN)	2	2	0	26–23	+3
2	Benjamin Lah (SLO)	2	1	1	33–24	+9
3	Melvin Schol (NED)	2	0	2	23–39	–16

	Score	
Benjamin Lah (SLO)	25–12	Melvin Schol (NED)
Benjamin Lah (SLO)	12–12	Mathias Brix Willard (DEN)
Melvin Schol (NED)	11–14	Mathias Brix Willard (DEN)

==== Group B ====
Rank	Athlete	B	W	L	Pts	Score
1	Tomasz Szewczak (POL)	2	2	0	65–8	+57
2	Mohsen Hamid Aghchay (IRI)	2	1	1	21–27	–6
3	Tim Weidenbecher (GER)	2	0	2	12–63	–51

	Score	
Tim Weidenbecher (GER)	0–50	Tomasz Szewczak (POL)
Tim Weidenbecher (GER)	12–13	Mohsen Hamid Aghchay (IRI)
Tomasz Szewczak (POL)	15–8	Mohsen Hamid Aghchay (IRI)

=== Finals ===
Semifinals
Mathias Brix Willard (DEN)	8
Mohsen Hamid Aghchay (IRI)	9
Tomasz Szewczak (POL)	11
Benjamin Lah (SLO)	9

Final
Mohsen Hamid Aghchay (IRI)	0
Tomasz Szewczak (POL)	14
Third place
Mathias Brix Willard (DEN)	0
Benjamin Lah (SLO)	10
