= Dancesport at the 2017 World Games – Standard =

Dancesport standard at the 2017 World Games
- Venue: Centennial Hall
- Date: 28 July 2017
- Competitors: 48 from 24 nations

Medalists
1st place, gold medalist(s)		Benedetto Ferruggia; Claudia Köhler	Germany
2nd place, silver medalist(s)		Dmitry Zharkov; Olga Kulikova	Russia
3rd place, bronze medalist(s)		Evaldas Sodeika; Ieva Žukauskaitė	Lithuania

The standard competition in dancesport at the 2017 World Games took place on 28 July 2017 at the Centennial Hall in Wrocław, Poland.

== Competition format ==
A total of 24 pairs entered the competition. Best ten pairs from round one qualifies directly to the semifinal. In redance additional four pairs qualifies to the semifinal. From semifinal the best six pairs qualifies to the final.

== Results ==
Rank	Athletes	Nation	Round 1	Redance	Semifinal	Final
1st place, gold medalist(s)	Benedetto Ferruggia/Claudia Köhler	Germany	Q		Q	1
2nd place, silver medalist(s)	Dmitry Zharkov/Olga Kulikova	Russia	Q		Q	2
3rd place, bronze medalist(s)	Evaldas Sodeika/Ieva Žukauskaitė	Lithuania	Q		Q	3
4	Francesco Galuppo/Debora Pacini	Italy	Q		Q	4
5	Mateusz Brzozowski/Justyna Możdżonek	Poland	Q		Q	5
6	Csaba László/Viktoria Pali	Hungary	Q		Q	6
7	Edgars Linis/Eliza Ancane	Latvia	Q			
8	Vladlen Kravchenko/Marina Laptiyeva	Kazakhstan	Q			
9	Paul Ionut Rednic/Roxana Lucaciu	Romania	Q			
10	Shen Hong/Liang Yujie	China	Q			
11	Aliaksandr Samosiuk/Yana Tudvaseva	Belarus		Q		
12	Klemens Hofer/Barbara Westermayer	Austria		Q		
13	Lubomir Mick/Adriana Dindofferova	Slovakia		Q		
14	Adrian Esperon/Patricia Martinez	Spain		Q		
15	Ergo Lukk/Baile Orb	Estonia				
16	Earle Williamson/Vashti Reed	United States				
17	Michal Drha/Klára Zámečníková	Czech Republic				
18	Brodie Barden/Lana Skrgic-De Fonseka	Australia				
19	Takeshi Yamamoto/Tomomi Yamamoto	Japan				
20	Dima Kusnir/Valeria Gumeniuc	Moldova				
21	Christopher Mejia/Camila Arboleda	Ecuador				
21	Daniel Zaharia/Sarah-Maude Thibaudeau	Canada				
23	Francesco Paris/Natalia Driker	Israel				
24	Kim Dong-soo/Hong In-hwa	South Korea				
