= Netherlands at the 2017 World Games =

- IOC code: NED
- NOC: NOC*NSF

in Wrocław, Poland 20 July 2017 – 30 July 2017
- Competitors: 23 in 4 sports
- Medals Ranked 25th: Gold 2 Silver 2 Bronze 2 Total 6

World Games appearances
- 1981; 1985; 1989; 1993; 1997; 2001; 2005; 2009; 2013; 2017; 2022; 2025

Netherlands competed at the 2017 World Games in Wrocław, Poland, from July 20, 2017, to July 30, 2017.

== Competitors ==
Sports	Men	Women	Total	Events
Ju-jitsu	5	1	6	5
Karate	1	0	1	1
Korfball	7	7	14	1
Trampoline	0	2	2	1
Total	13	10	23	8

== Gymnastic ==
=== Trampoline ===
Netherlands has qualified at the 2017 World Games:

- Women's Synchronized Trampoline - 1 quota

== Ju-jitsu ==
Athlete	Event	Group Stage			Semifinal	Final / BM	
Athlete	Event	Opposition Score	Opposition Score	Rank	Opposition Score	Opposition Score	Rank
Ruben Assmann; Marnix Willem Bunnik	Men's duo						2nd place, silver medalist(s)
Ecco van der Veer	Men's fighting 62 kg	Apolonov (GER); L 4 - 10	Viviescas Ortíz (COL); L 0 - 50	3	Did not advance		
Boy Vogelzang	Men's fighting 69 kg	Kovačević (MNE); W 50 - 0	Gutiérrez Cortés (MEX); W 50 - 0	1	Toplak (SLO); W 8 - 2	Korzhavykh (RUS); W 8 - 6	1st place, gold medalist(s)
Melvin Schol	Men's fighting 94 kg	Lah (SLO); L 12 - 25	Brix Willard (DEN); L 1 - 14	3	Did not advance		
Aafke van Leeuwen	Women's fighting 70 kg	Attenberger (GER); W 9 - 5	Tanzer (DEN); W 6 - 3	1 Q	Lalande (FRA); L 9 - 12	Maćkowiak (POL); W 9 - 8	3rd place, bronze medalist(s)

== Karate ==
Athlete	Event	Elimination round				Semifinal	Final / BM	
Athlete	Event	Opposition Result	Opposition Result	Opposition Result	Rank	Opposition Result	Opposition Result	Rank
Geoffrey Berens	Men's kumite 60 kg	Gómez (ESP); L 0–4	Farzaliyev (AZE); D 0–0	Al-Malki (KSA); D 0–0	3	Did not advance		

== Korfball ==
Netherlands has qualified at the 2017 World Games in the Korfball Mixed Team event.

Preliminary round

Pos	Team	Pld	W	OTW	OTL	L	GF	GA	GD	Pts	Qualification
1	Netherlands	3	3	0	0	0	87	36	+51	9	Semifinals
2	Belgium	3	2	0	0	1	78	45	+33	6	Semifinals
3	Australia	3	1	0	0	2	43	79	−36	3	5–8th place semifinals
4	China	3	0	0	0	3	46	94	−48	0	5–8th place semifinals

Source: 2017 World Games

July 21, 2017	Netherlands	33–10	China	Wrocław
15:15		Report		Stadium: WKK Sport Center

July 22, 2017	Netherlands	24–16	Belgium	Wrocław
19:00		Report		Stadium: WKK Sport Center

July 23, 2017	Australia	10–30	Netherlands	Wrocław
13:30		Report		Stadium: WKK Sport Center

Semifinal

July 24, 2017	Germany	13–25	Netherlands	Wrocław
20:45		Report		Stadium: WKK Sport Center

Final

July 25, 2017	Netherlands	26–14	Chinese Taipei	Wrocław
19:00		Report		Stadium: WKK Sport Center

== Tug of war ==
Netherlands won the silver medal in the men's outdoor 700 kg event.
