= Boules sports at the 2017 World Games – Women's lyonnaise progressive =

Boules sports - Women's Lyonnaise Progressive at the 2017 World Games
- Venue: Centennial Hall, Wrocław, Poland
- Date: 22 July 2017
- Competitors: 8 from 8 nations

Medalists
gold medal	(France) Barbara Barthet
silver medal	(China) Wang Yang
bronze medal	(Italy) Serena Traversa

The women's lyonnaise progressive competition in boules sports at the 2017 World Games took place on 22 July 2017 at the Centennial Hall in Wrocław, Poland.

== Competition format ==
A total of 8 athletes entered the competition. Due to heavy rain after qualifications rest of the competition was cancelled. Qualification results has been recognized as final results.

== Results ==
=== Qualification ===
Rank	Athlete	Nation	Round 1	Round 2	Result	Note
1st place, gold medalist(s)	Barbara Barthet	France	42	41	83	Q
2nd place, silver medalist(s)	Wang Yang	China	40	40	80	Q
3rd place, bronze medalist(s)	Serena Traversa	Italy	37	38	75	Q
4	Nina Volcina	Slovenia	30	37	67	Q
5	Necla Sahin	Turkey	29	35	64	
6	Ekaterina Erasova	Russia	26	27	53	
7	Virginia Bajrić	Croatia	21	21	42	
8	Melisa Polito Molina	Chile	19	21	40	
