= Ju-jitsu at the 2017 World Games – Men's ne-waza 85 kg =

Men's ne-waza 85 kg at the 2017 World Games
- Venue: GEM Sports Complex
- Date: 28 July 2017
- Competitors: 6 from 6 nations

Medalists
1st place, gold medalist(s)		(Mexico) Dan Schon
2nd place, silver medalist(s)		(Switzerland) Daniel de Maddalena
3rd place, bronze medalist(s)		(Russia) Abdulbari Guseinov

The men's ne-waza 85 kg competition in ju-jitsu at the 2017 World Games took place on 28 July 2017 at the GEM Sports Complex in Wrocław, Poland.

== Results ==
=== Elimination round ===
==== Group A ====
Rank	Athlete	B	W	L	Pts	Score
1	Daniel de Maddalena (SUI)	2	2	0	200–0	+200
2	Dan Schon (MEX)	2	1	1	0–100	–100
3	David Ben Zaken (ISR)	2	0	2	0–100	–100

	Score	
Dan Schon (MEX)	0–100	Daniel de Maddalena (SUI)
Dan Schon (MEX)	0–0	David Ben Zaken (ISR)
Daniel de Maddalena (SUI)	100–0	David Ben Zaken (ISR)

==== Group B ====
Rank	Athlete	B	W	L	Pts	Score
1	Abdulbari Guseinov (RUS)	2	2	0	200–0	+200
2	Haidar Al-Rasheed (JOR)	2	1	1	4–102	–102
3	Abdurahmanhaji Murtazaliev (KGZ)	2	0	2	2–104	–102

	Score	
Haidar Al-Rasheed (JOR)	0–100	Abdulbari Guseinov (RUS)
Haidar Al-Rasheed (JOR)	4–2	Abdurahmanhaji Murtazaliev (KGZ)
Abdulbari Guseinov (RUS)	100–0	Abdurahmanhaji Murtazaliev (KGZ)

=== Finals ===
Semifinals
Daniel de Maddalena (SUI)	4
Haidar Al-Rasheed (JOR)	2
Abdulbari Guseinov (RUS)	0
Dan Schon (MEX)	0

Final
Daniel de Maddalena (SUI)	0
Dan Schon (MEX)	2
Third place
Haidar Al-Rasheed (JOR)	0
Abdulbari Guseinov (RUS)	100
