= Boules sports at the 2017 World Games – Men's lyonnaise precision =

Boules sports - Men's Lyonnaise Precision at the 2017 World Games
- Venue: Centennial Hall, Wrocław, Poland
- Date: 24 July 2017
- Competitors: 8 from 8 nations

Medalists
gold medal	(Argentina) Nicolas Pretto
silver medal	(Croatia) Pero Ćubela
bronze medal	(France) Gregory Chirat

The men's lyonnaise precision competition in boules sports at the 2017 World Games took place on 24 July 2017 at the Centennial Hall in Wrocław, Poland.

== Competition format ==
A total of 8 athletes entered the competition. Top 4 athletes from qualification advances to the final.

== Results ==
=== Qualification ===
Rank	Athlete	Nation	Round 1	Round 2	Result	Note
1	Gregory Chirat	France	21	24	45	Q
2	Nicolas Pretto	Argentina	21	17	38	Q
3	Pero Ćubela	Croatia	25	12	37	Q
4	Ivan Galoić	Bosnia and Herzegovina	17	18	35	Q
5	Suo Wentao	China	13	13	26	
5	Davide Manolino	Italy	14	12	26	
7	Santo Junior Pascuzzi	Australia	13	11	24	
8	Florian Valeri	Monaco	3	6	9	

=== Final ===
Rank	Athlete	Nation	Result
1st place, gold medalist(s)	Nicolas Pretto	Argentina	20
2nd place, silver medalist(s)	Pero Ćubela	Croatia	17
3rd place, bronze medalist(s)	Gregory Chirat	France	17
4	Ivan Galoić	Bosnia and Herzegovina	13
