= Ju-jitsu at the 2017 World Games – Men's ne-waza +94 kg =

Men's ne-waza +94 kg at the 2017 World Games
- Venue: GEM Sports Complex
- Date: 28 July 2017
- Competitors: 6 from 6 nations

Medalists
1st place, gold medalist(s)		(Morocco) Seif-Eddine Houmine
2nd place, silver medalist(s)		(France) Frédéric Husson
3rd place, bronze medalist(s)		(Russia) Aleksandr Sak

The men's ne-waza +94 kg competition in ju-jitsu at the 2017 World Games took place on 28 July 2017 at the GEM Sports Complex in Wrocław, Poland.

== Results ==
=== Elimination round ===
==== Group A ====
Rank	Athlete	B	W	L	Pts	Score
1	Aleksandr Sak (RUS)	2	2	0	2–2	0
2	Yahya Al-Hamadi (UAE)	2	1	1	2–2	0
3	Makrem Saanouni (TUN)	2	0	2	0–0	0

	Score	
Aleksandr Sak (RUS)	2–2	Yahya Al-Hamadi (UAE)
Aleksandr Sak (RUS)	0–0	Makrem Saanouni (TUN)
Yahya Al-Hamadi (UAE)	0–0	Makrem Saanouni (TUN)

==== Group B ====
Rank	Athlete	B	W	L	Pts	Score
1	Seif-Eddine Houmine (MAR)	2	2	0	200–0	+200
2	Frédéric Husson (FRA)	2	1	1	0–100	–100
3	Danny Feliz Capitao (SUI)	2	0	2	0–100	–100

	Score	
Frédéric Husson (FRA)	0–0	Danny Feliz Capitao (SUI)
Frédéric Husson (FRA)	0–100	Seif-Eddine Houmine (MAR)
Danny Feliz Capitao (SUI)	0–100	Seif-Eddine Houmine (MAR)

=== Finals ===
Semifinals
Aleksandr Sak (RUS)	0
Frédéric Husson (FRA)	2
Seif-Eddine Houmine (MAR)	100
Yahya Al-Hamadi (UAE)	0

Final
Frédéric Husson (FRA)	0
Seif-Eddine Houmine (MAR)	100
Third place
Aleksandr Sak (RUS)	2
Yahya Al-Hamadi (UAE)	2
