= Karate at the 2017 World Games – Men's kumite +84 kg =

Men's Kumite +84kg at the 2017 World Games
- Venue: GEM Sports Complex
- Date: 26 July 2017
- Competitors: 8 from 8 nations

Medalists
1st place, gold medalist(s)		(Japan) Hideyoshi Kagawa
2nd place, silver medalist(s)		(Iran) Sajjad Ganjzadeh
3rd place, bronze medalist(s)		(Poland) Michał Bąbos

The men's kumite +84 kg competition in karate at the 2017 World Games took place on 26 July 2017 at the GEM Sports Complex in Wrocław, Poland.

== Results ==
=== Elimination round ===
==== Group A ====
Rank	Athlete	B	W	D	L	Pts	Score
1	Hideyoshi Kagawa (JPN)	3	2	0	1	4	5–12
2	Sajjad Ganjzadeh (IRI)	3	2	0	1	4	16–7
3	Jonathan Horne (GER)	3	1	0	2	2	8–9
4	Rodrigo Rojas (CHI)	3	1	0	2	2	11–12

	Score	
Sajjad Ganjzadeh (IRI)	4–4	Hideyoshi Kagawa (JPN)
Rodrigo Rojas (CHI)	0–8	Jonathan Horne (GER)
Sajjad Ganjzadeh (IRI)	4–3	Rodrigo Rojas (CHI)
Hideyoshi Kagawa (JPN)	1–0	Jonathan Horne (GER)
Sajjad Ganjzadeh (IRI)	8–0	Jonathan Horne (GER)
Hideyoshi Kagawa (JPN)	0–8	Rodrigo Rojas (CHI)

==== Group B ====
Rank	Athlete	B	W	D	L	Pts	Score
1	Achraf Ouchen (MAR)	3	2	0	1	4	20–14
2	Michał Bąbos (POL)	3	2	0	1	4	11–8
3	Anđelo Kvesić (CRO)	3	2	0	1	4	8–6
4	Kenny Guillem (FRA)	3	0	0	3	0	4–15

	Score	
Kenny Guillem (FRA)	0–3	Michał Bąbos (POL)
Anđelo Kvesić (CRO)	3–5	Achraf Ouchen (MAR)
Kenny Guillem (FRA)	0–3	Anđelo Kvesić (CRO)
Michał Bąbos (POL)	7–6	Achraf Ouchen (MAR)
Kenny Guillem (FRA)	4–9	Achraf Ouchen (MAR)
Michał Bąbos (POL)	1–2	Anđelo Kvesić (CRO)

=== Finals ===
Semifinals
Hideyoshi Kagawa (JPN)	7
Michał Bąbos (POL)	4
Achraf Ouchen (MAR)	2
Sajjad Ganjzadeh (IRI)	3

Final
Hideyoshi Kagawa (JPN)	6
Sajjad Ganjzadeh (IRI)	5
Third place
Michał Bąbos (POL)	8
Achraf Ouchen (MAR)	0
