= Ju-jitsu at the 2017 World Games – Men's ne-waza open =

Men's ne-waza open at the 2017 World Games
- Venue: GEM Sports Complex
- Date: 29 July 2017
- Competitors: 13 from 11 nations

Medalists
1st place, gold medalist(s)		(Hungary) Kristóf Szűcs
2nd place, silver medalist(s)		(United Arab Emirates) Faisal Al-Ketbi
3rd place, bronze medalist(s)		(Morocco) Seif-Eddine Houmine

The men's ne-waza open competition in ju-jitsu at the 2017 World Games took place on 29 July 2017 at the GEM Sports Complex in Wrocław, Poland.

== Competition format ==
A total of 13 athletes entered the competition. They fought in elimination system.

== Results ==
Quarterfinals
(Hungary) Kristóf Szűcs (HUN)	99
(Sweden) Max Hederström (SWE)	0
(Russia) Aleksandr Sak (RUS)	4
(United Arab Emirates) Yahya Al-Hamadi (UAE)	4
(Poland) Maciej Kozak (POL)	5
(Israel) Evyatar Paperni (ISR)	2
(Morocco) Seif-Eddine Houmine (MAR)	50
(France) Hidar Reza Abbas (FRA)	0
(Japan) Joao Carlos Hiroshi Kuraoka (JPN)	0
(United Arab Emirates) Faisal Al-Ketbi (UAE)	50

Semifinals
(Hungary) Kristóf Szűcs (HUN)	7
(Russia) Aleksandr Sak (RUS)	2
(Poland) Maciej Kozak (POL)	4
(Belgium) Wim Deputter (BEL)	6
(Morocco) Seif-Eddine Houmine (MAR)	3
(Russia) Abdulbari Guseinov (RUS)	0
(United Arab Emirates) Faisal Al-Ketbi (UAE)	3
(Belgium) Florent Minguet (BEL)	0

Final
(Hungary) Kristóf Szűcs (HUN)	99
(Belgium) Wim Deputter (BEL)	0
(Morocco) Seif-Eddine Houmine (MAR)	0
(United Arab Emirates) Faisal Al-Ketbi (UAE)	2

Final
(Hungary) Kristóf Szűcs (HUN)	2
(United Arab Emirates) Faisal Al-Ketbi (UAE)	0

Bronze medal match
(Belgium) Wim Deputter (BEL)	0
(Morocco) Seif-Eddine Houmine (MAR)	3
