= Dancesport at the 2022 World Games =

- Venue: Legacy Arena (Standard, Latin, Rock 'n' Roll); Sloss Furnaces (Breaking)
- Dates: 8–10 July
- No. of events: 5

The dancesport competition at the 2022 World Games took place from 8 to 10 July 2022, in Birmingham in United States, at Sloss Furnaces and the Legacy Arena. Originally scheduled to take place in July 2021, the Games were rescheduled for July 2022 as a result of the 2020 Summer Olympics postponement due to the COVID-19 pandemic. This was the first time when breaking, which is set to be an official event to be contested at the 2024 Summer Olympics, was a part of the World Games programme.

== Medal table ==
* Host nation (United States)

Rank	Nation	Gold	Silver	Bronze	Total
1	United States*	1	2	0	3
2	Germany	1	1	0	2
3	Japan	1	0	2	3
4	Lithuania	1	0	1	2
5	Moldova	1	0	0	1
6	Italy	0	1	0	1
6	Switzerland	0	1	0	1
8	Austria	0	0	1	1
8	France	0	0	1	1
Totals (9 entries)		5	5	5	15

== Medalists ==
Event	Gold	Silver	Bronze
Standard	Lithuania; Ieva Sodeikienė; Evaldas Sodeika	Italy; Debora Pacini; Francesco Galuppo	Lithuania; Veronika Golodneva; Vaidotas Lacitis
Latin	Moldova; Anna Matus; Gabriele Pasquale Goffredo	Germany; Khrystyna Moshenska; Marius-Andrei Balan	France; Elena Salikhova; Charles-Guillaume Schmitt
Rock'n'Roll	Germany; Michelle Uhl; Tobias Bludau	Switzerland; Noëmi Kuran-Pellegatta; Nicolas Kuran-Pellegatta	Austria; Anna Sturm; Matthias Feichtinger
B-Boys	Victor Montalvo (Victor); United States	Jeffrey Louis (Jeffro); United States	Shigeyuki Nakarai (Shigekix); Japan
B-Girls	Ami Yuasa (Ami); Japan	Sunny Choi (Sunny); United States	Ayumi Fukushima (Ayumi); Japan
