= Lithuania at the 2022 World Games =

- IOC code: LTU
- NOC: National Olympic Committee of Lithuania

in Birmingham, United States
- Competitors: 11 in 4 sports
- Medals Ranked 45th: Gold 1 Silver 0 Bronze 1 Total 2

World Games appearances
- 1981; 1985; 1989; 1993; 1997; 2001; 2005; 2009; 2013; 2017; 2022

Lithuania competed in the 2022 World Games in Birmingham, United States, from 7 to 17 July 2022. The games were originally scheduled for July 2021, but were postponed due to the rescheduling of the Tokyo 2020 Olympic Games. Athletes representing Lithuania won one gold medal and one bronze medal. The country finished in 45th place in the medal table.

== Medalists ==
Medal	Name	Sport	Event	Date
Gold	Evaldas Sodeika; Ieva Sodeikienė	DanceSport	Standard Dances	9 July
Bronze	Veronika Golodneva; Vaidotas Lacitis	DanceSport	Standard Dances	9 July

== Competitors ==
The following is the list of number of competitors in the Games.

Sport	Men	Women	Total
Air sports	2	0	2
Dancesport	3	3	6
Kickboxing	1	0	1
Orienteering	1	1	2
Total	7	4	11

== Air sports ==
Lithuania competed in air sports.

Athletes	Event	Qualification		Round of 32	Repechage 1	Round of 16	Repechage 2	Quarter-final	Semi-final	Final	Rank
Athletes	Event	Score	Rank	Round of 32	Repechage 1	Round of 16	Repechage 2	Quarter-final	Semi-final	Final	Rank
Arminas Volskis	Drone Racing	27.164672	15	3rd in Heat 4; 57.51808 R	2nd in Heat 1; 1:20.039936 R	–	3rd in Heat 2; 1:18.44864	did not advance			17
Mantas Zitkus	Drone Racing	26.656768	13	2nd in Heat 8; 1:27.404544 Q	–	3rd in Heat 4; 1:16.558336	3rd in Heat 4; 50.20672	did not advance			18

== Dancesport ==
Lithuania qualified three couples to mixed pair standard ballroom dancing competition.

Athletes	Event	Qualification		Semi-final		Final	
Athletes	Event	Score	Rank	Score	Rank	Score	Rank
Indrė Baltaragė; Edgaras Baltaragis	Standard	170.58	9th Q	171.00	9th	did not advance	
Veronika Golodneva; Vaidotas Lacitis	Standard	183.58	3rd Q	184.75	3rd Q	187.62	Bronze
Evaldas Sodeika; Ieva Sodeikienė	Standard	193.25	1st Q	193.67	1st Q	195.58	Gold

== Kickboxing ==
Lithuania competed in kickboxing.

Athletes	Event	Quterfinal	Semifinal	Final
Henrikas Vikšraitis	Men's K1 75kg	(Czech Republic) Dvoracek; L 0–3	did not advance	

== Orienteering ==
Athletes	Event	Result	Rank
Algirdas Bartkevičius	Men's sprint	15:58.00	25
Algirdas Bartkevičius	Men's middle distance	42:50.00	23
Kastė Rutkauskaitė	Women's sprint	19:23.00	27
Kastė Rutkauskaitė	Women's middle distance	54:09.00	24
