= Ju-jitsu at the 2017 World Games – Women's fighting 70 kg =

Women's fighting 70 kg at the 2017 World Games
- Venue: GEM Sports Complex
- Date: 28 July 2017
- Competitors: 6 from 6 nations

Medalists
1st place, gold medalist(s)		(Germany) Theresa Attenberger
2nd place, silver medalist(s)		(France) Chloé Lalande
3rd place, bronze medalist(s)		(Netherlands) Aafke van Leeuwen

The women's fighting 70 kg competition in ju-jitsu at the 2017 World Games took place on 28 July 2017 at the GEM Sports Complex in Wrocław, Poland.

== Results ==
=== Elimination round ===
==== Group A ====
Rank	Athlete	B	W	L	Pts	Score
1	Aafke van Leeuwen (NED)	2	2	0	15–8	+7
2	Theresa Attenberger (GER)	2	1	1	16–12	+4
3	Liva Tanzer (DEN)	2	0	2	6–17	–11

	Score	
Aafke van Leeuwen (NED)	9–5	Theresa Attenberger (GER)
Aafke van Leeuwen (NED)	6–3	Liva Tanzer (DEN)
Theresa Attenberger (GER)	11–3	Liva Tanzer (DEN)

==== Group B ====
Rank	Athlete	B	W	L	Pts	Score
1	Emilia Maćkowiak (POL)	2	2	0	21–8	+13
2	Chloé Lalande (FRA)	2	1	1	57–8	+49
3	Veronica Lopez (MEX)	2	0	2	1–63	–62

	Score	
Chloé Lalande (FRA)	7–8	Emilia Maćkowiak (POL)
Chloé Lalande (FRA)	50–0	Veronica Lopez (MEX)
Emilia Maćkowiak (POL)	13–1	Veronica Lopez (MEX)

=== Finals ===
Semifinals
Aafke van Leeuwen (NED)	9
Chloé Lalande (FRA)	12
Emilia Maćkowiak (POL)	0
Theresa Attenberger (GER)	50

Final
Chloé Lalande (FRA)	5
Theresa Attenberger (GER)	13
Third place
Aafke van Leeuwen (NED)	9
Emilia Maćkowiak (POL)	8
