= Finswimming at the 2017 World Games – Men's 100 m bi-fins =

Finswimming event on 21 July 2017 in Wrocław, Poland

Finswimming - Men's Bi-fins 100 m at the 2017 World Games
- Venue: Orbita Indoor Swimming Pool, Wrocław, Poland
- Dates: 21 July 2017
- Competitors: 8 from 7 nations

Medalists
gold medal	(Belarus) Dmitry Gavrilov
silver medal	(Hungary) Gergő Kosina
bronze medal	(Czech Republic) Jakub Jarolim

The men's bi-fins 100 m event in finswimming at the 2017 World Games took place on 21 July 2017 at the Orbita Indoor Swimming Pool in Wrocław, Poland.

== Competition format ==
A total of 8 athletes entered the competition. Only final was held.

== Results ==
=== Final ===
Rank	Athlete	Nation	Time
1st place, gold medalist(s)	Dmitry Gavrilov	Belarus	41.65
2nd place, silver medalist(s)	Gergő Kosina	Hungary	41.91
3rd place, bronze medalist(s)	Jakub Jarolim	Czech Republic	42.18
4	Dmitrii Lapshin	Russia	42.51
5	Dmitry Servyakov	Russia	42.95
6	Clement Becq	France	43.21
7	Adrijan Omicevic	Croatia	44.12
8	Naoya Hirano	Japan	44.72
