= Ju-jitsu at the 2017 World Games – Men's fighting +94 kg =

Men's fighting +94 kg at the 2017 World Games
- Venue: GEM Sports Complex
- Date: 29 July 2017
- Competitors: 6 from 6 nations

Medalists
1st place, gold medalist(s)		Alexandre Fromangé (FRA)
2nd place, silver medalist(s)		Rafał Riss (POL)
3rd place, bronze medalist(s)		Dejan Vukčević (MNE)

The men's fighting +94 kg competition in ju-jitsu at the 2017 World Games took place on 29 July 2017 at the GEM Sports Complex in Wrocław, Poland.

== Results ==
=== Elimination round ===
==== Group A ====
Rank	Athlete	B	W	L	Pts	Score
1	Rafał Riss (POL)	2	2	0	100–0	+100
2	Christian Alvarez (ESP)	2	1	1	16–60	–44
3	Makrem Saanouni (TUN)	2	0	2	10–66	–56

	Score	
Rafał Riss (POL)	50–0	Makrem Saanouni (TUN)
Rafał Riss (POL)	50–0	Christian Alvarez (ESP)
Makrem Saanouni (TUN)	10–16	Christian Alvarez (ESP)

==== Group B ====
Rank	Athlete	B	W	L	Pts	Score
1	Alexandre Fromangé (FRA)	2	2	0	57–1	+56
2	Dejan Vukčević (MNE)	2	1	1	13–12	+1
3	Angelos Varvarigos (GRE)	2	0	2	5–62	–57

	Score	
Dejan Vukčević (MNE)	1–7	Alexandre Fromangé (FRA)
Dejan Vukčević (MNE)	12–5	Angelos Varvarigos (GRE)
Alexandre Fromangé (FRA)	50–0	Angelos Varvarigos (GRE)

=== Finals ===
Semifinals
Rafał Riss (POL)	9
Dejan Vukčević (MNE)	3
Alexandre Fromangé (FRA)	50
Christian Alvarez (ESP)	0

Final
Rafał Riss (POL)	5
Alexandre Fromangé (FRA)	7
Third place
Dejan Vukčević (MNE)	50
Christian Alvarez (ESP)	0
