= Bosnia and Herzegovina at the 2017 World Games =

- IOC code: BIH
- NOC: Olympic Committee of Bosnia and Herzegovina

in Wrocław, Poland 20 July 2017 – 30 July 2017
- Competitors: 2 in 2 sports
- Medals Ranked 15th: Gold 0 Silver 1 Bronze 0 Total 1

World Games appearances
- 2017; 2022; 2025

Bosnia and Herzegovina competed at the 2017 World Games held in Wrocław, Poland, from 20 to 30 July 2017. The nation did not participate in any previous World Games and made its debut in the 2017 event. The Bosnian delegation consisted of two athletes competing in two sports.

== Background ==
Bosnia and Herzegovina was part of Yugoslavia till 1992, after which it declared its independence. A National Olympic Committee was formed on 4 June 1992 on the eve of the 1992 Summer Olympics and was approved provisionally by the International Olympic Committee (IOC) before full recognition on 24 September 1993. In 1997, it officially became the Olympic Committee of Bosnia and Herzegovina.

== Competitors ==
Sport	Men	Women	Total
Boules sports	1	0	1
Kickboxing	1	0	1
Total	2	0	2

== Boules sports ==
Ivan Galoic was the lone participant in Boules sports. The Men's lyonnaise precision competition took place on 24 July 2017 at the Centennial Hall in Wrocław. In the event, he qualified for the finals after placing fourth in the qualification rounds with a score of 35 points. In the finals, he missed out on a medal after he finished last amongst the four participants.

Athlete	Event	Qualification				Final	Rank
Athlete	Event	Round 1	Round 2	Total	Rank	Final	Rank
Ivan Galoic	Men's lyonnaise precision	17	18	35	4 Q	13	4

== Kickboxing ==
Mesud Selimovic was the lone participant in the men's cruiserweight category in Kickboxing at the Games. The Kickboxing was represented as an invitation event at the Games for the first time and hence was not eligible for medals. The competition took place from 26 to 27 July 2017 at the Orbita Hall in Wrocław. In the event, Selimovic won the quarterfinals and semifinals, before losing to Dawid Kasperski of Poland in the finals to finish second.

Athlete	Event	Quarterfinals	Semifinals	Final	Rank
Mesud Selimovic	Men's cruiserweight	(Morocco) El Felak; W 2–1	(Iran) Nosrati; W 3–0	(Poland) Kasperski; L 0–3	2nd place, silver medalist(s)
