= Boules sports at the 2017 World Games – Women's petanque precision shooting =

Boules sports - Women's Petanque Precision Shooting at the 2017 World Games
- Venue: Centennial Hall, Wrocław, Poland
- Dates: 22–24 July 2017
- Competitors: 8 from 8 nations

Medalists
gold medal	(France) Caroline Bourriaud
silver medal	(Thailand) Nantawan Fuengsanit
bronze medal	(China) Chao Gujin

The women's petanque precision shooting competition in boules sports at the 2017 World Games took place from 22 to 24 July 2017 at the Centennial Hall in Wrocław, Poland.

== Competition format ==
A total of 8 athletes entered the competition. Top 4 athletes from qualification advances to semifinals.

== Results ==
=== Qualification ===
Rank	Athlete	Nation	Round 1	Round 2	Score	Note
1	Caroline Bourriaud	France	36		36	Q
2	Chao Gujin	China	34		34	Q
3	Nantawan Fuengsanit	Thailand	34	39	73	Q
4	Vonifanja Rakotoalijohn	Madagascar	32	38	70	Q
5	Camille Max	Belgium	30	39	69	
6	Veronica Martinez Latorre	Spain	31	26	57	
7	Indra Waldbusser	Germany	28	23	51	
8	Anna Szubielska	Poland	16	18	34	

=== Finals ===
Semifinals
1	(France) Caroline Bourriaud	24
4	(Madagascar) Vonifanja Rakotoalijohn	15
2	(China) Chao Gujin	33
3	(Thailand) Nantawan Fuengsanit	44

Final
1	(France) Caroline Bourriaud	43
3	(Thailand) Nantawan Fuengsanit	38
Third place
4	(Madagascar) Vonifanja Rakotoalijohn	14
2	(China) Chao Gujin	36
