= Kickboxing at the 2017 World Games – Men's cruiserweight =

Kickboxing - Men's cruiserweight at the 2017 World Games
- Venue: Orbita Hall, Wrocław, Poland
- Dates: 26–27 July 2017
- Competitors: 8 from 8 nations

Medalists
gold medal	(Poland) Dawid Kasperski
silver medal	(Bosnia and Herzegovina) Mesud Selimović
bronze medal	(Iran) Omid Nosrati

The men's cruiserweight competition in kickboxing at the 2017 World Games took place from 26 to 27 July 2017 at the Orbita Hall in Wrocław, Poland.

== Competition format ==
A total of 8 athletes entered the competition. They fought in the cup system.

== Results ==
Quarterfinals
(Russia) Roman Piatnica	3
(Croatia) Ivan Cuklin	0
(United States) Jerome Ward
(Poland) Dawid Kasperski	KO
(Iran) Omid Nosrati	KO
(Moldova) Adrian Gologan
(Bosnia and Herzegovina) Mesud Selimović	2
(Morocco) Aziz El Felak	1

Semifinals
(Russia) Roman Piatnica	0
(Poland) Dawid Kasperski	3
(Iran) Omid Nosrati	0
(Bosnia and Herzegovina) Mesud Selimović	3

Final
(Poland) Dawid Kasperski	3
(Bosnia and Herzegovina) Mesud Selimović	0

Third place
(Russia) Roman Piatnica	0
(Iran) Omid Nosrati	3
