= Lithuania at the 2017 World Games =

Lithuania at the World Games 2017
- IOC code: LTU

in Wrocław, Poland 20 July 2017 – 30 July 2017
- Competitors: 4 in 1 sport
- Medals Ranked 57th: Gold 0 Silver 0 Bronze 1 Total 1

World Games appearances
- 1981; 1985; 1989; 1993; 1997; 2001; 2005; 2009; 2013; 2017; 2022; 2025

Lithuania competed at the World Games 2017 in Wrocław, Poland, from 20 July 2017 to 30 July 2017. It is one of the smallest Lithuanian teams ever, participating only in one sport.

== Competitors ==
Sports	Men	Women	Total	Events
Dance sports	2	2	4	2
Total	2	2	4	2

== Dance sport ==
Lithuania has qualified at the 2017 World Games:

- Latin dance - Mixed pairs: Miglė Klupšaitė and Jokūbas Venckus
- Standard dance - Mixed pairs: Ieva Žukauskaitė and Evaldas Sodeika and they won the bronze medal
