= Sport climbing at the 2017 World Games – Women's boulder =

Sport climbing - Women's Boulder at the 2017 World Games
- Venue: Nowy Targ Square, Wrocław, Poland
- Dates: 21 July 2017
- Competitors: 11 from 8 nations

Medalists
gold medal	(Serbia) Staša Gejo
silver medal	(Japan) Miho Nonaka
bronze medal	(France) Fanny Gibert

The women's boulder competition in sport climbing at the 2017 World Games took place on 21 July 2017 at the Nowy Targ Square in Wrocław, Poland.

== Competition format ==
A total of 11 athletes entered the competition. In qualification every athlete has to get on the top of 4 boulders. Top 6 climbers qualify to final.

== Results ==
=== Qualifications ===
Rank	Athlete	Nation	Result	Note
1	Akiyo Noguchi	Japan	3t4 4b10	Q
2	Miho Nonaka	Japan	3t8 4b14	Q
3	Fanny Gibert	France	3t11 4b13	Q
4	Margo Hayes	United States	2t3 4b22	Q
5	Monika Retschy	Germany	2t4 4b16	Q
6	Staša Gejo	Serbia	2t5 4b19	Q
7	Katharina Saurwein	Austria	2t6 4b16	
8	Aya Onoe	Japan	2t6 2b6	
9	Alma Bestvater	Germany	1t6 4b11	
10	Katarzyna Ekwińska	Poland	0t 2b4	
11	Lucinda Stirling	Australia	0t 2b18	

=== Final ===
Rank	Athlete	Nation	Result
1st place, gold medalist(s)	Staša Gejo	Serbia	4t10 4b8
2nd place, silver medalist(s)	Miho Nonaka	Japan	3t10 3b8
3rd place, bronze medalist(s)	Fanny Gibert	France	2t2 2b2
4	Akiyo Noguchi	Japan	2t3 2b3
5	Monika Retschy	Germany	1t6 2b7
6	Margo Hayes	United States	0t 2b11
