= Hideyoshi Kagawa =

Japanese karateka (born 1987)

Personal information
- Born: 14 August 1987 (age 38)

Sport
- Country: Japan
- Sport: Karate
- Weight class: +84 kg
- Events: Kumite; Team kumite
Medal record
Men's karate
Representing Japan
World Championships
Silver medal – second place	2016 Linz	Team kumite
Bronze medal – third place	2014 Bremen	Team kumite
Bronze medal – third place	2018 Madrid	Team kumite
Asian Games
Silver medal – second place	2014 Incheon	Kumite +84 kg
World Games
Gold medal – first place	2017 Wrocław	Kumite +84 kg

Hideyoshi Kagawa (born 14 August 1987) is a Japanese karateka. He won the silver medal in the men's kumite +84 kg event at the 2014 Asian Games in Incheon, South Korea. In the final, he lost against Rashed Al-Mutairi of Kuwait.

In 2017, he won the gold medal in the men's kumite +84 kg event at the World Games held in Wrocław, Poland. In the final, he defeated Sajjad Ganjzadeh of Iran.

At the 2019 Asian Karate Championships held in Tashkent, Uzbekistan, he won the silver medal in the men's kumite +84 kg event. In the final, he lost against Tareg Hamedi of Saudi Arabia.

== Achievements ==
Year	Competition	Venue	Rank	Event
2014	Asian Games	Incheon, South Korea	2nd	Kumite +84 kg
2014	World Championships	Bremen, Germany	3rd	Team kumite
2016	World Championships	Linz, Austria	2nd	Team kumite
2017	World Games	Wrocław, Poland	1st	Kumite +84 kg
2018	World Championships	Madrid, Spain	3rd	Team kumite
2019	Asian Championships	Tashkent, Uzbekistan	2nd	Kumite +84 kg
