= Ju-jitsu at the 2017 World Games – Women's ne-waza open =

Women's ne-waza open at the 2017 World Games
- Venue: GEM Sports Complex
- Date: 29 July 2017
- Competitors: 6 from 5 nations

Medalists
| 1st place, gold medalist(s) | | (Belgium) Amal Amjahid |
| 2nd place, silver medalist(s) | | (Jordan) Luma Hatem Sharif Alqubaj |
| 3rd place, bronze medalist(s) | | (Poland) Emilia Maćkowiak |

The women's ne-waza open competition in ju-jitsu at the 2017 World Games took place on 29 July 2017 at the GEM Sports Complex in Wrocław, Poland.

== Results ==
Quarterfinals
(France) Chloé Lalande (FRA) | 50
(Portugal) Ana Nair Marques Dias (POR) | 0
(France) Séverine Nébié (FRA) | 0
(Poland) Emilia Maćkowiak (POL) | 2

Semifinals
(Belgium) Amal Amjahid (BEL) | 99
(France) Chloé Lalande (FRA) | 0
(Jordan) Luma Hatem Sharif Alqubaj (JOR) | 27
(Poland) Emilia Maćkowiak (POL) | 0

Final
(Belgium) Amal Amjahid (BEL) | 1
(Jordan) Luma Hatem Sharif Alqubaj (JOR) | 0

| Bronze medal match |
| (France) Chloé Lalande (FRA) | 2 |
| (Poland) Emilia Maćkowiak (POL) | 6 |
