= Morocco at the 2017 World Games =

- IOC code: MAR

in Wrocław, Poland 20 July 2017 – 30 July 2017
- Medals: Gold 1 Silver 0 Bronze 1 Total 2

World Games appearances
- 1981; 1985; 1989; 1993; 1997; 2001; 2005; 2009; 2013; 2017; 2022; 2025

Morocco competed at the 2017 World Games held in Wrocław, Poland.

== Medalists ==
Medal	Name	Sport	Event
Gold	Seif-Eddine Houmine	Ju-jitsu	Men's ne-waza +94 kg
Bronze	Seif-Eddine Houmine	Ju-jitsu	Men's ne-waza open

== Ju-jitsu ==
Seif-Eddine Houmine won the gold medal in the men's ne-waza +94 kg event and the bronze medal in the men's ne-waza open event.

== Karate ==
Achraf Ouchen lost the bronze medal match in the men's kumite +84 kg event.
