= Robin Malý =

Czech ice hockey player

- Born: May 17, 1989 (age 35)
- Height: 5 ft 11 in (180 cm)
- Weight: 176 lb (80 kg; 12 st 8 lb)
- Position: Defence
- Shoots: Left
- Czech Extraliga team: HC Sparta Praha
- Playing career: 2008–present

Robin Malý (born May 17, 1989) is a Czech professional ice hockey player. He played with HC Sparta Praha during the 2010–11 season.
