= Karate at the 2014 Asian Games – Men's kumite +84 kg =

Karate competition

Men's kumite +84 kg at the 2014 Asian Games
- Venue: Gyeyang Gymnasium
- Date: 4 October 2014
- Competitors: 10 from 10 nations

Medalists
gold medal	Rashed Al-Mutairi	Kuwait
silver medal	Hideyoshi Kagawa	Japan
bronze medal	Sengpheng Duangvilai	Laos
bronze medal	Khalid Khalidov	Kazakhstan

The men's kumite +84 kilograms competition at the 2014 Asian Games in Incheon, South Korea was held on 4 October 2014 at the Gyeyang Gymnasium.

== Schedule ==
All times are Korea Standard Time (UTC+09:00)

Date	Time	Event
Saturday, 4 October 2014	09:30	1/8 finals
Saturday, 4 October 2014	09:30	Quarterfinals
Saturday, 4 October 2014	09:30	Semifinals
Saturday, 4 October 2014	09:30	Finals

== Results ==
Legend

- H — Won by hansoku (8–0)
- S — Won by shikkaku (Disqualification from the competition)

=== Main bracket ===
1/8 finals
Peng Hui (CHN)	1
Sajjad Ganjzadeh (IRI)	7
Ismail Al-Loh (PLE)
Aýbik Ýuldaşew (TKM)	H

Quarterfinals
Sajjad Ganjzadeh (IRI)	11
Sulaiman Al-Mulla (UAE)	4
Sengpheng Duangvilai (LAO)	2
Hideyoshi Kagawa (JPN)	3
Aýbik Ýuldaşew (TKM)	1
Rashed Al-Mutairi (KUW)	6
Lou Wai Kit (MAC)	1
Khalid Khalidov (KAZ)	7

Semifinals
Sajjad Ganjzadeh (IRI)	6
Hideyoshi Kagawa (JPN)	9^{S}
Rashed Al-Mutairi (KUW)	2
Khalid Khalidov (KAZ)	1

Final
Hideyoshi Kagawa (JPN)	4
Rashed Al-Mutairi (KUW)	7

=== Repechage ===
Bronze medal contest
Sengpheng Duangvilai (LAO)
Bye
Aýbik Ýuldaşew (TKM)	0
Khalid Khalidov (KAZ)	8
