= Cecilie Klysner =

Danish orienteering competitor (born 1994)

Cecilie Friberg Klysner
Personal information
- Born: 2 May 1994 (age 32)

Sport
- Sport: Orienteering
Medal record
Women's orienteering
Representing Denmark
World Championships
Gold medal – first place	2016 Strömstad	Mixed sprint relay
Silver medal – second place	2017 Tartu	Mixed sprint relay
World Games
Gold medal – first place	2017 Wrocław	Mixed sprint relay

Cecilie Friberg Klysner (born 2 May 1994) is a Danish orienteering competitor. At the 2016 World Orienteering Championships in Strömstad she won a gold medal in mixed sprint relay with the Danish team, along with Tue Lassen, Søren Bobach and Maja Alm.
