= British Virgin Islands at the 2017 World Games =

British Virgin Islands at the World Games 2017
- IOC code: IVB
- NOC: British Virgin Islands Olympic Committee

in Wrocław, Poland 20 July 2017 – 30 July 2017
- Competitors: 1 in 1 sport
- Medals: Gold 0 Silver 0 Bronze 0 Total 0

World Games appearances
- 1981; 1985; 1989; 1993; 1997; 2001; 2005; 2009; 2013; 2017; 2022; 2025

British Virgin Islands competed at the World Games 2017 in Wrocław, Poland, from July 20, 2017, to July 30, 2017.

== Competitors ==
Sports	Men	Women	Total	Events
Squash	1	0	1	1
Total	1	0	1	1

== Squash ==
Athlete	Event	Round of 32	Round of 16	Quarterfinals	Semifinals	Final / BM	
Athlete	Event	Opposition Score	Opposition Score	Opposition Score	Opposition Score	Opposition Score	Rank
Joe Chapman	Men's singles	(United Kingdom) Douglas Kempsell; L 1–3	did not advance				
