= Bosnia and Herzegovina at the 2022 World Games =

- IOC code: BIH

in Birmingham, United States 7 July 2022 – 17 July 2022
- Competitors: 3 (3 men) in 2 sports and 3 events
- Medals Ranked 63rd: Gold 0 Silver 1 Bronze 0 Total 1

World Games appearances
- 1981; 1985; 1989; 1993; 1997; 2001; 2005; 2009; 2013; 2017; 2022; 2025

Bosnia and Herzegovina competed at the 2022 World Games held in Birmingham, United States from 7 to 17 July 2022. Athletes representing Bosnia and Herzegovina won one silver medal and the country finished in 63rd place in the medal table.

== Medalists ==
Medal	Name	Sport	Event	Date
Silver	Sanjin Pehlivanović	Cue sports	Men's 9-ball pool	16 July

== Competitors ==
The following is the list of number of competitors in the Games:

Sport	Men	Women	Total
Cue sports	1	0	1
Kickboxing	2	0	2
Total	3	0	3

== Cue sports ==
Bosnia and Herzegovina won one silver medal in cue sports.

== Kickboxing ==
Bosnia and Herzegovina competed in kickboxing.
