= Estonia at the 2017 World Games =

Estonia at the World Games 2017
- IOC code: EST

in Wrocław, Poland 20 July 2017 – 30 July 2017
- Competitors: 7 in 3 sports
- Medals: Gold 0 Silver 0 Bronze 0 Total 0

World Games appearances
- 1981; 1985; 1989; 1993; 1997; 2001; 2005; 2009; 2013; 2017; 2022; 2025

Estonia competed at the World Games 2017 in Wrocław, Poland, from 20 July 2017 to 30 July 2017.

== Competitors ==
Sports	Men	Women	Total	Events
Cue sports	1	0	1	1
Dance sports	1	1	2	1
Orienteering	2	2	4	5
Total	4	3	7	7

== Cue sports ==
- Snooker – Andres Petrov

== Dance sport ==
- Standard dance – Ergo Lukk/Baile Orb

== Orienteering ==
- Kristo Heinmann
- Evely Kaasiku
- Kenny Kivikas
- Annika Rihma
