= Iraq at the 2017 World Games =

Iraq at the World Games 2017
- IOC code: IRQ
- NOC: National Olympic Committee of Iraq

in Wrocław, Poland 20 July 2017 – 30 July 2017
- Competitors: 1 in 1 sport

World Games appearances
- 1981; 1985; 1989; 1993; 1997; 2001; 2005; 2009; 2013; 2017; 2022; 2025

Iraq competed at the 2017 World Games in Wrocław, Poland, from 20 July 2017 to 30 July 2017 but failed to win any medals, due to the loss of its only competitor at the Muaythai event in the first round.

== Competitors ==
| Sports | Men | Women | Total | Events |
|---|---|---|---|---|
| Muaythai | 1 | 0 | 1 | 1 |
| Total | 1 | 0 | 1 | 1 |

Muaythai

Only one iraqi Muay Thai Fighter, Akram Al-Qaysi has qualified for the 2017 World Games and was defeated by Ukrainian Sergii Kuliaba via the second round TKO at the 67 kg male division.

Men's -67 kg - ( Akram Al-Qaysi )

Kickboxing

Thulfiqar Mohammed Kadhim has qualified for the Men's -81 kg Kickboxing event at the 2017 World Games, but for an unexplained reason he did not compete and was replaced by another fighter.
