= Serbia at the 2017 World Games =

Serbia at the World Games 2017
- IOC code: SRB
- NOC: Serbian Olympic Committee

in Wrocław, Poland 20 July 2017 – 30 July 2017
- Competitors: 8 in 2 (1) sports
- Medals: Gold 1 Silver 0 Bronze 0 Total 1

World Games appearances
- 1981; 1985; 1989; 1993; 1997; 2001; 2005; 2009; 2013; 2017; 2022; 2025

Serbia competed at the World Games 2017 in Wrocław, Poland, from 20 July 2017 to 30 July 2017.

== Medalists ==
Medal	Name	Sport	Event	Date
Gold	Staša Gejo	Sport climbing	Women's boulder	July 21

=== On invitational events ===
Medal	Name	Sport	Event	Date
Gold	Slobodan Mijajlovic	Kickboxing	Men's K1 67 kg	July 27
Gold	Aleksandar Menkovic	Kickboxing	Men's K1 81 kg	July 27
Silver	Aleksandar Konovalov	Kickboxing	Men's K1 63.5 kg	July 27
Silver	Teodora Manic	Kickboxing	Women's K1 65 kg	July 27
