= Orienteering at the 2017 World Games =

- Venues: Centennial Hall, City Center, Trzebnica Aquapark
- Dates: 25–27 July 2017
- No. of events: 5
- Competitors: 83 from 26 nations

The orienteering competition at the 2017 World Games took place from July 25 to July 27, in Wrocław in Poland, at the Centennial Hall, City Center and Trzebnica Aquapark.

== Participating nations ==
- Austria (4)
- Belarus (1)
- Belgium (1)
- Brazil (4)
- Canada (5)
- Chinese Taipei (2)
- Czech Republic (4)
- Denmark (4)
- Estonia (4)
- Finland (5)
- France (4)
- Germany (1)
- Great Britain (5)
- Hungary (4)
- Italy (1)
- Japan (1)
- Kazakhstan (1)
- Latvia (1)
- New Zealand (4)
- Norway (4)
- Poland (4)
- Russia (4)
- Spain (1)
- Sweden (5)
- Switzerland (5)
- Ukraine (4)

== Medal table ==
Rank	Nation	Gold	Silver	Bronze	Total
1	Sweden	2	0	1	3
2	Denmark	2	0	0	2
3	Switzerland	1	3	2	6
4	Russia	0	1	1	2
5	Belgium	0	1	0	1
6	Czech Republic	0	0	1	1
Totals (6 entries)		5	5	5	15

== Events ==
=== Men's events ===
Event	Gold	Silver	Bronze
Sprint	Sweden; Jerker Lysell	Belgium; Yannick Michiels	Switzerland; Matthias Kyburz
Middle Distance	Switzerland; Matthias Kyburz	Switzerland; Florian Howald	Czech Republic; Vojtěch Král

=== Women's events ===
Event	Gold	Silver	Bronze
Sprint	Denmark; Maja Alm	Switzerland; Elena Roos	Sweden; Lina Strand
Middle Distance	Sweden; Helena Jansson	Russia; Natalia Gemperle	Switzerland; Sabine Hauswirth

=== Mixed event ===
Event	Gold	Silver	Bronze
Mixed Team Relay	Denmark; Cecilie Klysner; Andreas Boesen; Soren Bobach; Maja Alm	Switzerland; Elena Roos; Florian Howald; Matthias Kyburz; Sabine Hauswirth	Russia; Natalia Gemperle; Dmitry Tsvetkov; Andrey Khramov; Galina Vinogradova
