= Speedway at the 2017 World Games =

- Venue: Stadion Olimpijski
- Dates: 29 July 2017
- Competitors: 21 from 7 nations

The speedway event at the 2017 World Games was held at the Stadion Olimpijski in Poland. For the second time after the 1985 World Games, speedway was included in the World Games programme as an invitational sport, the Polish team won on home soil.

== Participating nations ==
- Australia (3)
- Denmark (3)
- Germany (3)
- Great Britain (3)
- Poland (3)
- Russia (3)
- Sweden (3)

== Medalists ==
Event	Gold	Silver	Bronze
Men's team	Poland; Patryk Dudek; Maciej Janowski; Bartosz Zmarzlik	Australia; Jason Doyle; Max Fricke; Chris Holder	Sweden; Antonio Lindback; Fredrik Lindgren; Peter Ljung

== Medal table ==
Rank	Nation	Gold	Silver	Bronze	Total
1	Poland	1	0	0	1
2	Australia	0	1	0	1
3	Sweden	0	0	1	1
Totals (3 entries)		1	1	1	3
