= Tajikistan at the 2017 World Games =

Tajikistan at the World Games 2017
- IOC code: TJK
- NOC: National Olympic Committee of the Republic of Tajikistan

in Wrocław, Poland 20 July 2017 – 30 July 2017
- Competitors: 1 in 1 sport

World Games appearances
- 1981; 1985; 1989; 1993; 1997; 2001; 2005; 2009; 2013; 2017; 2022; 2025

Tajikistan competed at the World Games 2017 in Wrocław, Poland, from 20 July 2017 to 30 July 2017.

== Competitors ==
Sports	Men	Women	Total	Events
Kickboxing	0	1	1	1
Total	0	1	1	1

== Kickboxing ==
Tajikistan has qualified at the 2017 World Games:

- Women's -52 kg – 1 quota (Zuhro Kholova)
