= Madagascar at the 2017 World Games =

Madagascar at the World Games 2017
- IOC code: MAD
- NOC: Comité Olympique Malgache

in Wrocław, Poland 20 July 2017 – 30 July 2017
- Competitors: 1 in 1 sport

World Games appearances
- 1981; 1985; 1989; 1993; 1997; 2001; 2005; 2009; 2013; 2017; 2022; 2025

Madagascar competed at the World Games 2017 in Wrocław, Poland, from 20 July 2017 to 30 July 2017.

== Competitors ==
Sports	Men	Women	Total	Events
Boules Sports	0	1	1	1
Total	0	1	1	1

== Boules sports ==
Madagascar has qualified at the 2017 World Games:

- Petanque Women's Singles Precision Shooting - 1 quota
