= Aleksandar Konovalov =

Serbian kickboxer

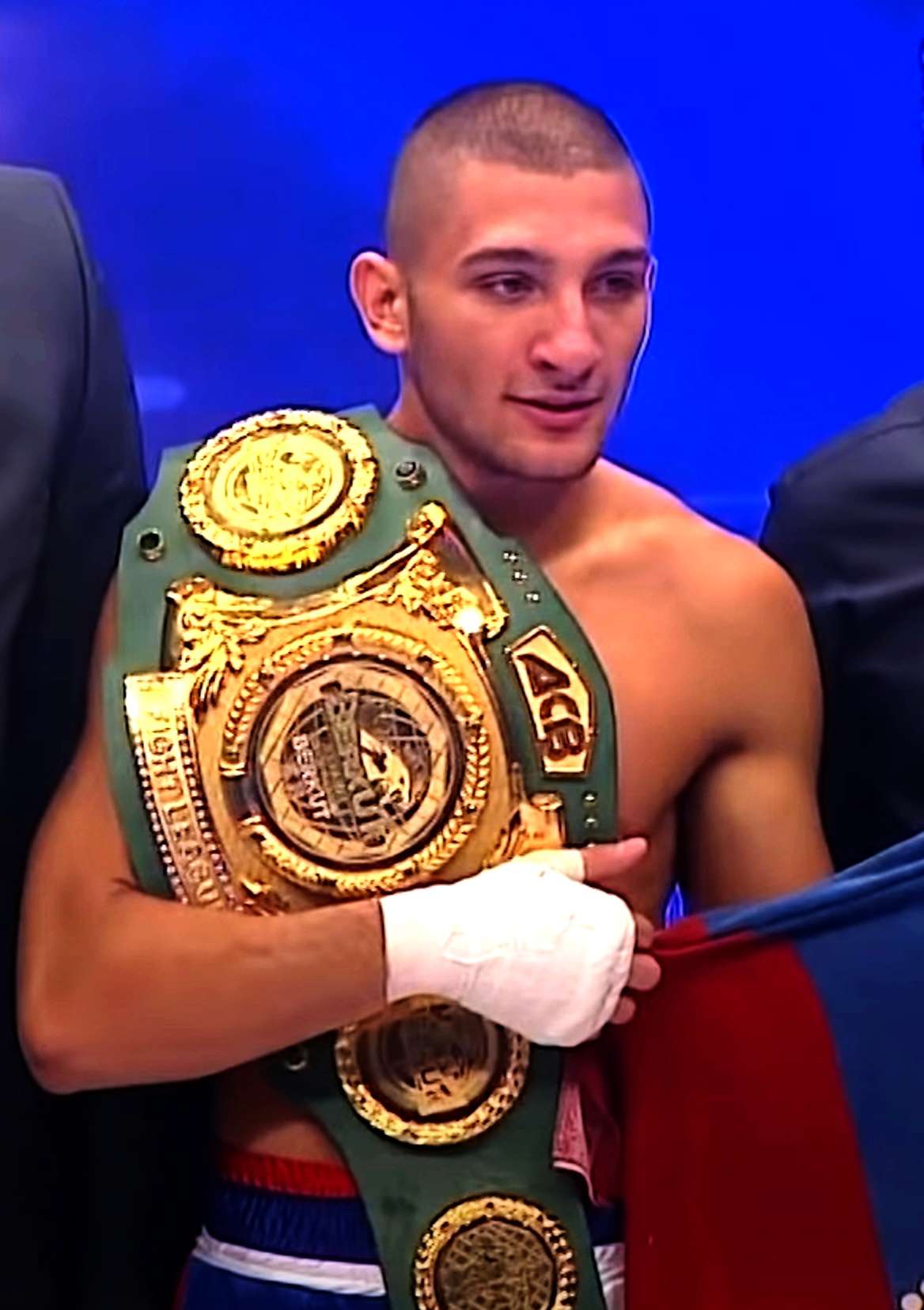
- Born: 15 May 1994 (age 32); Jagodina, Serbia, FR Yugoslavia
- Height: 1.73 m (5 ft 8 in)
- Weight: 67 kg (148 lb; 10.6 st)
- Style: Kickboxing
- Stance: Orthodox
- Fighting out of: Jagodina, Serbia
- Team: Palmini tigrovi
- Years active: 2009–present

Professional boxing record
- Total: 3
- Wins: 3
- By knockout: 3
- Losses: 0

Kickboxing record
- Total: 42
- Wins: 41
- Losses: 1

Amateur kickboxing record
- Total: 152
- Wins: 147
- Losses: 5

Other information
- Boxing record from BoxRec

Aleksandar Konovalov (15. may 1994. Jagodina) is a Serbian kickboxer and boxer.

== Kickboxing career ==
Konovalov captured his first professional title on April 11, 2014, when he defeated Marco De Paolis by knockout for the vacant WAKO Pro low kick European light welterweight title.

Konovalov took part in the 2015 ACB-KB Grand Prix in the 61 kg division. In the first round happening on April 17, 2015, he faced Khan Jung from Korea at ACB KB 1: Grand Prix Quarter-Finals. He won the fight by knockout in the first round.

In the second round of the ACB Kickboxing Grand Prix happening on September 27, 2015, at ACB KB 2: Grand Prix Semi-finals Konovalov faced Umar Paskhaev. He won the fight by unanimous decision.

Konovalov reached the final of the 2015 ACB-KB Grand Prix where he faced Yakub Bersanukaev at ACB KB 4: Grand Prix Final on November 13, 2015. He won the fight by knockout in the first round.

On February 27, 2016, Konovalov faced Andoni Iglesias in his hometown of Jagodina, Serbia for the vacant WAKO Pro low kick world light welterweight title. He won the fight by technical knockout in the fifth and last round to capture the title.

Konovalov successfully defended his WAKO Pro low kick world title against Luca Mameli on March 12, 2017, defeating him by technical knockout in the third round after scoring three knockdowns.

Konovalov was scheduled to make the third defense of his WAKO Pro low kick world light welterweight title on March 9, 2019, against Ionuț Atodiresei. He won the fight by first-round knockout.

On December 14, 2019, Konovalov defeated Oleksandr Ukrainets by unanimous decision in Nils, Serbia.

After a break due to the COVID-19 pandemic Konovalov made his return to professional competition in a new weightclass, facing Andre Santos on March 5, 2021, for the vacant WAKO Pro low kick world welterweight title. He won the fight by unanimous decision.

== Professional boxing career ==
Konovalov made his professional boxing debut on May 31, 2019, against Roland Tejfel. He won the fight via second-round technical knockout.

== Titles and achievements ==
=== Professional ===
- World Association of Kickboxing Organizations
  - 2014 WAKO Pro Low Kick European Light Welterweight (−64.5 kg) Champion
  - 2016 WAKO Pro Low Kick World Light Welterweight (−64.5 kg) Champion (three defenses)
  - 2021 WAKO Pro Low Kick World Welterweight (−66.8 kg) Champion

=== Amateur ===
- World Association of Kickboxing Organizations
  - 2010 WAKO Junior World Championships Low Kick −54 kg (gold)
  - 2011 WAKO Junior World Championships Low Kick −60 kg (bronze)
  - 2012 WAKO Junior World Championships Low Kick −60 kg (gold)
  - 2013 WAKO World Championships Low Kick −63.5 kg (gold)
  - 2015 WAKO World Championships Low Kick −63.5 kg (gold)
  - 2015 WAKO World Championships Best Competitor Award
  - 2016 WAKO European Championships K-1 -63.5 kg (gold)
  - 2017 WAKO World Championships Low Kick −63.5 kg (gold)
  - 2018 WAKO European Championships Low Kick −67 kg (gold)
  - 2019 WAKO World Championships Low Kick −67 kg (gold)
  - 2021 WAKO World Championships Low Kick −71 kg (gold)
  - 2022 WAKO European Championships Full Contact −75 kg (silver)
  - 2023 WAKO World Championships Low Kick −75 kg (bronze)
- World Games
  - 2017 World Games Kickboxing −63.5 kg (silver)
- European Games
  - 2023 European Games Full Contact −75 kg (bronze)

Awards

- 2019 Serbian Kickboxer of the Year

== Kickboxing record ==
Professional Kickboxing record
41 Wins, 1 Loss, 0 Draw
Date	Result	Opponent	Event	Location	Method	Round	Time
2021-03-05	Win	(Portugal) Andre Santos	Arena Friday Night	Belgrade, Serbia	Decision (Unanimous)	5	3:00
Wins the vacant WAKO Pro Low Kick World Welterweight (−66.8 kg) title.
2019-12-14	Win	(Ukraine) Oleksandr Ukrainets	Kik Boks Savez Srbije	Niš, Serbia	Decision (Unanimous)	3	3:00
2019-07-07	Win	(Greece) Vitalic Maiboroda	Palmini tigrovi Event 23 – Greece vs Serbia	Jagodina, Serbia	Decision (Unanimous)	3	3:00
2019-03-09	Win	(Romania) Ionuț Atodiresei		Jagodina, Serbia	KO (Body kick)	1	
Defends the WAKO Pro Low Kick World Light Welterweight (−64.5 kg) title.
2018-07-07	Win	(Turkey) Martan Songul	Palmini tigrovi Event 22	Končarevo, Serbia	TKO (Spinning back kick)	1	
2018-03-10	Win	(Portugal) Vitor Coimbra		Jagodina, Serbia	KO (Left hook to the body)	1	
Defends the WAKO Pro Low Kick World Light Welterweight (−64.5 kg) title.
2017-07-07	Win	(Austria) Mihajan Shmilevksi	Palmini tigrovi Event 21	Jagodina, Serbia	KO (Jumping knee)	1	0:20
2017-03-12	Win	(Italy) Luca Lameli		Jagodina, Serbia	TKO (3 Knockdowns)	3	
Defends the WAKO Pro Low Kick World Light Welterweight (−64.5 kg) title.
2016-07-07	Win	(United States) Kevin Croom	Palmini tigrovi Event 20 – USA vs Serbia	Končarevo, Serbia	TKO (Doctor stoppage/cut)	1	
2016-02-27	Win	(Spain) Andoni Iglesias		Jagodina, Serbia	TKO	5	
Wins the vacant WAKO Pro Low Kick World Light Welterweight (−64.5 kg) title.
2015-11-13	Win	(Russia) Yakub Bersanukaev	ACB KB 4: Grand Prix Final	Perm, Russia	KO (Left hook to the body)	1	2:11
Wins 2015 ACB-KB Grand Prix −60kg title.
2015-09-27	Win	(Russia) Umar Paskhaev	ACB KB 2: Grand Prix Semi-finals	Anapa, Russia	Decision (Unanimous)	3	3:00
2015-06-13	Win	(Slovakia) Adrian Horvat		Niš, Serbia	TKO (Spinning back kick)	1	0:50
2015-04-17	Win	(South Korea) Khan Jung	ACB KB 1: Grand Prix Quarter-Finals	Grozny, Russia	KO (Spinning back kick)	1	
2014-07-07	Win	(Czech Republic) Jan Holec	Palmini tigrovi Event 17 – Republic Czech vs Serbia	Končarevo, Serbia	Decision	3	3:00
2014-04-11	Win	(Italy) Marco De Paolis		Jagodina, Serbia	KO	1	
Wins the WAKO Pro Low Kick European Light Welterweight (−64.5 kg) title.
2013-07-07	Win	(Poland) Michal Krolik	Palmini tigrovi Event 16 – Poland vs Serbia	Jagodina, Serbia	Decision (Unanimous)	3	3:00
2013-03-	Win	(Serbia) Ivan Dragomirov		Jagodina, Serbia	Decision	3	3:00
2013-02-24	Win	(Serbia) Marko Cvetanović	Serbian Open	Belgrade, Serbia	Decision	3	3:00
2012-07-07	Win	(Italy) Leandro Causerano	Palmini tigrovi Event 15 – Italy vs Serbia	Jagodina, Serbia	KO (Punches)	1	
Legend: Win Loss Draw/No contest Notes

Amateur Kickboxing record
152 Wins, 8 Losses
Date	Result	Opponent	Event	Location	Method	Round	Time
2023-11-22	Loss	(Turkey) Unal Alkayis	2023 WAKO World Championship, Semifinals	Albufeira, Portugal	Decision (3:0)	3	2:00
Wins the 2023 WAKO World Championship Low Kick −75kg Bronze Medal.
2023-11-21	Win	(Uzbekistan) Davlatbek Rayimjonov	2023 WAKO World Championship, Quarterfinals	Albufeira, Portugal	Decision (3:0)	3	2:00
2023-11-20	Win	(Israel) Loai Sakas	2023 WAKO World Championship, Second Round	Albufeira, Portugal	Decision (3:0)	3	2:00
2023-11-19	Win	(Portugal) Amaro Pinheiro	2023 WAKO World Championship, First Round	Albufeira, Portugal	Decision (3:0)	3	2:00
2023-07-01	Loss	(Ukraine) Tymur Brykov	2023 European Games, Semi-final	Myślenice, Poland	Decision (3:0)	3	2:00
Wins the 2023 European Games Full Contact −75kg Bronze Medal.
2023-06-30	Win	(Republic of Ireland) Peter Carr	2023 European Games, Quarterfinal	Myślenice, Poland	Decision (3:0)	3	2:00
2022-11-18	Loss	(Georgia (country)) Luka Shoniya	WAKO European Championships 2022, Final	Antalya, Turkey	Decision (3:0)	3	2:00
Wins the 2022 WAKO European Championships Full Contact −75kg Silver Medal.
2022-11-17	Win	(Poland) Jakub Pokusa	WAKO European Championships 2022, Semi-final	Antalya, Turkey	Decision (3:0)	3	2:00
2022-11-	Win	(Finland) Jaakko Haanpaa	WAKO European Championships 2022, Quarterfinal	Antalya, Turkey	Decision (3:0)	3	2:00
2022-11-	Win	(Bulgaria) Mihail Veltchovski	WAKO European Championships 2022, First round	Antalya, Turkey	Decision (3:0)	3	2:00
2021-10-	Win	(Azerbaijan) Rahim Aliyev	WAKO World Championships 2021, Final	Jesolo, Italy	Decision (3:0)	3	2:00
Wins the 2021 WAKO World Championships Low Kick −71kg Gold Medal.
2021-10-	Win	(Bosnia and Herzegovina) Jasmin Ramic	WAKO World Championships 2021, Semi-final	Jesolo, Italy	Decision (3:0)	3	2:00
2021-10-	Win	(Turkey) Mevlane Altuntas	WAKO World Championships 2021, Quarterfinal	Jesolo, Italy	Decision (3:0)	3	2:00
2021-10-	Win	(Israel) Loai Sakas	WAKO World Championships 2021, Second round	Jesolo, Italy	Decision (3:0)	3	2:00
2021-10-	Win	(Croatia) Ante Buzov	WAKO World Championships 2021, First round	Jesolo, Italy	Decision (3:0)	3	2:00
2019-10-	Win	(Bulgaria) Dimtar Penchev	WAKO World Championships 2019, Final	Sarajevo, Bosnia and Herzegovina	Decision (3:0)	3	2:00
Wins the 2019 WAKO World Championships Low Kick −67kg Gold Medal.
2019-10-	Win	(Russia) Shamil Gadzhimusaev	WAKO World Championships 2019, Semi-final	Sarajevo, Bosnia and Herzegovina	Decision (2:1)	3	2:00
2019-10-	Win	(Azerbaijan) Zohrab Azimov	WAKO World Championships 2019, Quarterfinal	Sarajevo, Bosnia and Herzegovina	Decision (3:0)	3	2:00
2019-10-	Win	(India) Pynshrainmiki Rabon	WAKO World Championships 2019, Second round	Sarajevo, Bosnia and Herzegovina	Decision (3:0)	3	2:00
2018-10-	Win	(Poland) Eliasz Jankowski	WAKO European Championships 2018, Final	Bratislava, Slovakia	Decision (3:0)	3	2:00
Wins the 2018 WAKO European Championships Low Kick −67kg Gold Medal.
2018-10-	Win	(Russia) Ianis Budagov	WAKO European Championships 2018, Semi-final	Bratislava, Slovakia	Decision (3:0)	3	2:00
2018-10-	Win	(Croatia) Andrej Kedves	WAKO European Championships 2018, Quarterfinal	Bratislava, Slovakia	Decision (3:0)	3	2:00
2017-11-	Win	(Portugal) Andre Santos	WAKO World Championships 2017, Final	Budapest, Hungary	Decision (3:0)	3	2:00
Wins the 2017 WAKO World Championships Low Kick −63.5 kg Gold Medal.
2017-11-	Win	(Italy) Luca Mameli	WAKO World Championships 2017, Semi-final	Budapest, Hungary	Decision (3:0)	3	2:00
2017-11-	Win	(Russia) Ivan Adeev	WAKO World Championships 2017, Quarterfinal	Budapest, Hungary	Decision (2:1)	3	2:00
2017-11-	Win	(Spain) Andoni Iglesias	WAKO World Championships 2017, Second round	Budapest, Hungary	Decision (3:0)	3	2:00
2017-07-27	Loss	(Ukraine) Orfan Sananzade	2017 World Games, Final	Wrocław, Poland	Decision (2:1)	3	2:00
Wins the 2017 World Games Kickboxing −63.5 kg Silver Medal.
2017-07-26	Win	(Poland) Alexander Kalicki	2017 World Games, Semi-final	Wrocław, Poland	Decision (3:0)	3	2:00
2017-07-26	Win	(India) Iraj Moradi	2017 World Games, Quarterfinal	Wrocław, Poland	Decision (3:0)	3	2:00
2016-10-27	Win	(Ukraine) Orfan Sananzade	WAKO European Championships 2016, Final	Maribor, Slovenia	Decision (3:0)	3	2:00
Wins the 2016 WAKO European Championships K-1 -63.5 kg Gold Medal.
2016-10-26	Win	(Israel) Yehouda Levy	WAKO European Championships 2016, Semi-final	Maribor, Slovenia	Decision (3:0)	3	2:00
2016-10-25	Win	(Russia) Victor Mikhailov	WAKO European Championships 2016, Quarterfinal	Maribor, Slovenia	Decision (2:1)	3	2:00
2015-10-30	Win	(Russia) Shamil Gadzhimusaev	WAKO World Championships 2015, Final	Belgrade, Serbia	Decision (3:0)	3	2:00
Wins the 2015 WAKO World Championships Low Kick −63.5 kg Gold Medal.
2015-10-29	Win	(Bosnia and Herzegovina) Semir Delic	WAKO World Championships 2015, Semi-final	Belgrade, Serbia	RSCH		
2015-10-	Win	(Croatia) Ivan Zidar	WAKO World Championships 2015, Quarterfinal	Belgrade, Serbia	Decision (3:0)	3	2:00
2015-10-	Win	(Iran) Seyedhossein Najafizadeh	WAKO World Championships 2015, Second round	Belgrade, Serbia	KO	1	
2014-10-	Loss	(Russia) Ilya Afonin	WAKO European Championships 2014, Quarterfinal	Bilbao, Spain	Decision (2:1)	3	2:00
2013-10-	Win	(Mauritius) Facson Perrine	WAKO World Championships 2013, Final	Guaruja, Brazil	Decision	3	2:00
Wins the 2013 WAKO World Championships Low Kick −63.5 kg Gold Medal.
2013-10-	Win	(Russia) Aliashkab Patichev	WAKO World Championships 2013, Semi-final	Guaruja, Brazil	Decision	3	2:00
2013-10-	Win	(Sweden) Nils Widlund	WAKO World Championships 2013, Quarterfinal	Guaruja, Brazil	Decision	3	2:00
2013-09-	Win	(Peru) Cesar Sesoko Alva	WAKO World Championships 2013, First round	Guaruja, Brazil	Decision	3	2:00
2012-09-	Win	(Poland) Mateusz Rajewski	WAKO Cadets and Juniors World Championships 2012, Final	Bratislava, Slovakia	Decision	3	2:00
Wins the 2012 WAKO Junior World Championships Low Kick −60kg Gold Medal.
2010-09-	Win	(Ukraine) Oleksandr Ten	2010 WAKO Junior World Championship, Final	Belgrade, Serbia	Decision		
Wins the 2010 WAKO Junior World Championship Low Kick −54kg Gold Medal.
2010-09-	Win	(Russia) Astemir Borsov	2010 WAKO Junior World Championship, Semi-final	Belgrade, Serbia	Decision		
Legend: Win Loss Draw/No contest Notes

== Professional boxing record ==
3 fights	3 wins	0 losses
By knockout	3	0

No.	Result	Record	Opponent	Type	Round, time	Date	Location	Notes
3	Win	3–0	Vojtech Majer	TKO	2 (4), 1:31	20 Aug 2022	Jagodina, Serbia	
2	Win	2–0	Milan Zivkovic	KO	3 (6), 1:45	4 Sep 2020	Admiral Casino, Belgrade, Serbia	
1	Win	1–0	Roland Tejfel	TKO	2 (4), 0:45	31 May 2019	Hall of Sports, Belgrade, Serbia	

== See also ==
- List of male kickboxers
