= Achraf Ouchen =

Moroccan karateka (born 1997)

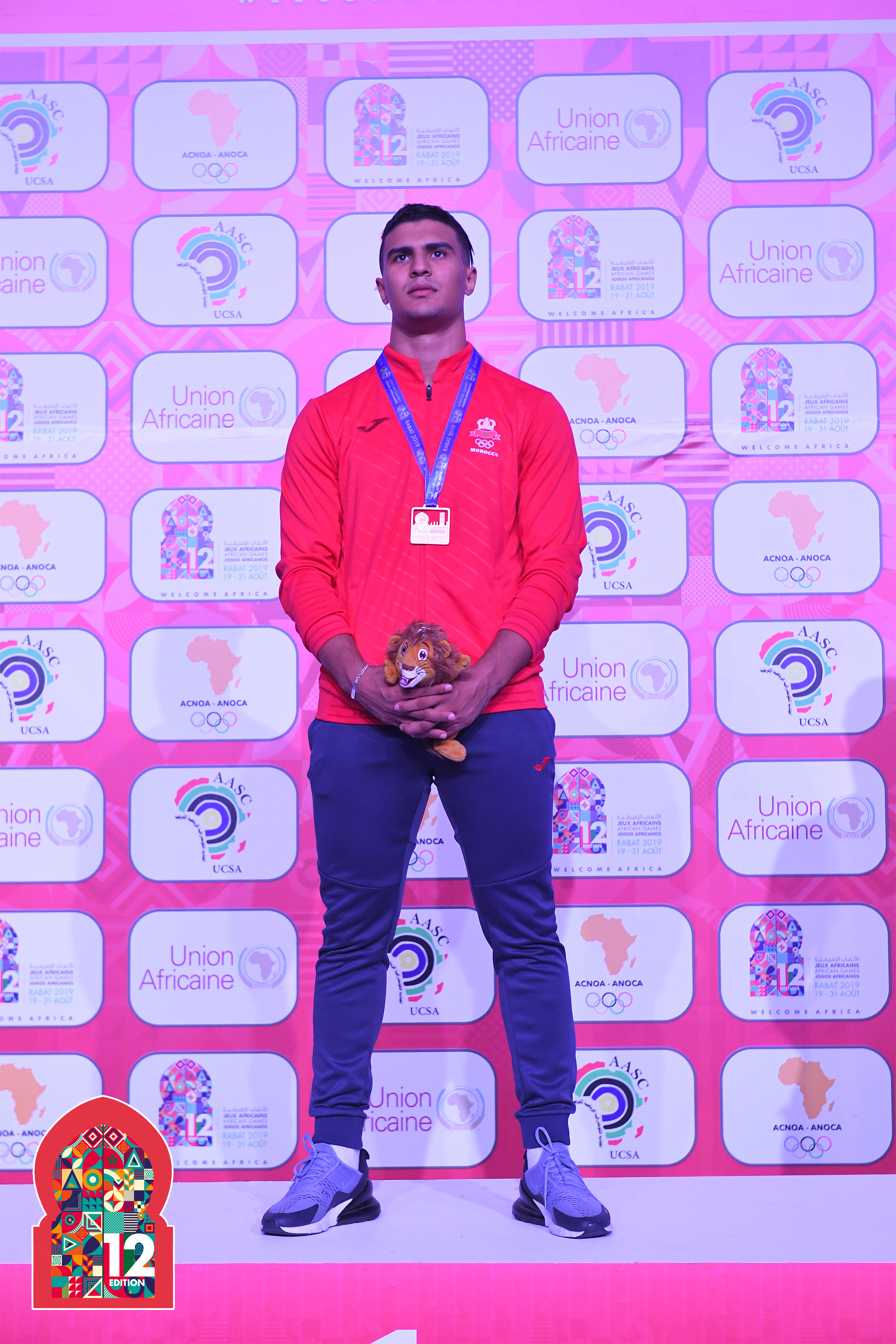

Achraf Ouchen (born 1 November 1997, Nador), is a Moroccan Karateka athlete who competes in the heavyweight division.

== Background ==
Originally from Nador in north-east Morocco

== Career ==
His biggest success is the silver medal of the 2016 World Karate Championships in Linz, Austria.

In 2017, he lost the bronze medal match in the men's Kumite +84 kg event at the 2017 World Games held in Wrocław, Poland.

He competes in the full-contact Karate league Karate Combat in the heavyweight division.

== Personal life ==
he was congratulated by Mohammed VI of Morocco for winning gold at the 2015 U21 World Championships.

== Achievements ==
2019

- Gold 12th African Games - Rabat (MAR) - Kumite +84 kg

2016

- Silver 23rd World Karate Championships - Linz (AUT) - Kumite +84 kg

2015

- Gold 9th World Junior, Cadet and U21 Championships - Jakarta (INA) - U21 Kumite +84 kg

2013

- Bronze 8th World Junior, Cadet and U21 Championships - Guadalajara 2013 (ESP) - Junior Kumite +76 kg
