= Montenegro at the 2017 World Games =

- IOC code: MNE

in Wrocław, Poland 20 July 2017 – 30 July 2017
- Medals Ranked 57th: Gold 0 Silver 0 Bronze 1 Total 1

World Games appearances
- 1981; 1985; 1989; 1993; 1997; 2001; 2005; 2009; 2013; 2017; 2022; 2025

Montenegro competed at the 2017 World Games held in Wrocław, Poland.

== Medalists ==
Medal	Name	Sport	Event
Bronze	Dejan Vukčević	Ju-jitsu	Men's fighting +94 kg

== Ju-jitsu ==
Dejan Vukčević won the bronze medal in the men's fighting +94 kg event.

== Karate ==
Marina Raković competed in the women's kumite 68 kg event.
