= Melvin Schol =

Dutch martial artist (born 1991)

- Born: 27 April 1991 (age 35)
- Nationality: Dutch
- Division: ju-jitsu (−94 kg), judo (−81 kg, −90 kg)
- Style: Fighting Ju-jitsu; Judo
- Trainer: Ben Rietdijk; Barry van Bommel

Other information
- Notable club: Ben Rietdijk Sport
- Last updated on: 30 November 2019

Melvin Schol (born 27 April 1991) is a dutch martial artist who represented his native country Netherlands in judo and since 2015 he switched for sport jujitsu.

He began with judo at hometown Velserbroek at Ben Rietdijk's judo academy. Since 2011 he was part of Netherlands's judo team. He was competing unsuccessfully with Neal van de Kamer for Netherlands's leader at −81 kg weight category. Around autumn 2014 he decided switch sport for sport jujitsu because Netherlands hosted in 2015 European championships in city Almere. He was trained by Dutch ju-jitsu legend Barry van Bommel and at European championships he took second place. Later on November he became world champion in ju-jitsu in Bangkok. He retired from top sport around 2018.
