= Jordan at the 2017 World Games =

- IOC code: JOR

in Wrocław, Poland 20 July 2017 – 30 July 2017
- Medals Ranked 52nd: Gold 0 Silver 1 Bronze 0 Total 1

World Games appearances
- 1981; 1985; 1989; 1993; 1997; 2001; 2005; 2009; 2013; 2017; 2022; 2025

Jordan competed at the 2017 World Games held in Wrocław, Poland.

== Medalists ==
Medal	Name	Sport	Event
Silver	Luma Hatem Sharif Alqubaj	Ju-jitsu	Women's ne-waza open

== Ju-jitsu ==
Luma Hatem Sharif Alqubaj won the silver medal in the women's ne-waza open event.

== Muay Thai ==
Mohammad Salama competed in the men's 81 kg event.
