= Seif-Eddine Houmine =

Moroccan Brazilian jiu-jitsu practitioner

- Born: Oujda, Morocco
- Nationality: Morocco
- Height: 1.90 m (6 ft 3 in)
- Division: Ultra-heavyweight (+100.5 kg)
- Style: Brazilian jiu-jitsu
- Team: GFTeam
- Trainer: Mathias Jardin; Zakaria Arhab
- Rank: Black belt in Brazilian jiu-jitsu

Seif-Eddine Houmine is a Moroccan Brazilian jiu-jitsu and ju-jitsu practitioner. He is an adult black belt World Jiu-Jitsu Championship champion in the ultra-heavyweight division and a gold medalist in ne-waza at the 2017 World Games.

== Biography ==
Houmine was born in Oujda, Morocco, and later moved to France. Before dedicating himself to Brazilian jiu-jitsu, he practiced other sports, including judo and rugby, and later began training Brazilian jiu-jitsu in Lille before joining GF Team in Paris.

As a black belt, Houmine became a competitor in the ultra-heavyweight division, a category for athletes over 100.5 kg. In 2024, he was the International Brazilian Jiu-Jitsu Federation (IBJJF) world champion in the ultra-heavyweight division after the original finalists were disqualified for anti-doping rule violations. With the result, he became the first Moroccan to win an adult black belt IBJJF world title.

In 2026, Houmine won the ultra-heavyweight division at the European Championship and also placed third in the open class. He later won the ultra-heavyweight division at the Pan Championship, placed third at the Brazilian Championship, and won the ultra-heavyweight division at the World Championship.
