= Dawid Kasperski =

Polish Muay Thai kickboxer (born 1990)

- Born: Dawid Kasperski; July 7, 1990 (age 36); Starachowice, Poland
- Nationality: Polish
- Height: 1.87 m (6 ft 1 1/2 in)
- Weight: 85 kg (187 lb; 13.4 st)
- Division: Middleweight
- Style: Kickboxing, Muay Thai
- Stance: Orthodox
- Fighting out of: Wrocław, Poland
- Team: Puncher
- Trainer: Janusz Janowski; Kacper Mielnik
- Years active: 2011 - present

Kickboxing record
- Total: 26
- Wins: 17
- By knockout: 2
- Losses: 8
- Draws: 1

Mixed martial arts record
- Total: 4
- Wins: 2
- By decision: 2
- Losses: 2
- By decision: 2

Other information
- Boxing record from BoxRec
- Mixed martial arts record from Sherdog

Dawid Kasperski
Medal record

Representing Poland

Kick-Box World Cup
Gold medal – first place	Szeged 2013	-86 kg

WAKO Amateur World Championships
Silver medal – second place	Guarujá 2013	-86 kg

Dawid Kasperski (born July 7, 1990) is a Polish Muay Thai kickboxer. He first came to prominence due to a successful amateur career by taking gold at the Kick-Box World Cup in 2013 and silver at the WAKO World Championships in the same year. Kasperski signed with the professional kickboxing promotion SUPERKOMBAT Fighting Championship in 2014, winning the SUPERKOMBAT Light heavyweight Tournament Champion on his debut on April 12. He is also a 14-time Polish Champion in Muay Thai, K-1 and kickboxing and Polish Professional Champion in K-1.

== Kickboxing career ==
Kasperski took part in the 2014 SUPERKOMBAT World Grand Prix I. In the semifinals he won a unanimous decision against Ciprian Șchiopu, and won a split decision against Errol Koning in the finals.

He fought at the SUPERKOMBAT Final Elimination event, against Ibrahim El Bouni. Kasperski won the fight by majority decision.

Kasperski participated in the November SUPERKOMBAT Grand Prix as well, being scheduled to fight Aristote Quitusisa in the semifinals. Quitusisa won the fight by split decision.

He won the WAKO World K-1 Heavyweight title in June 2017, with a decision win over Gregory Grossi.

He fought Dylan Colin in November 2017, in the KFWC Savate Semifinals. He lost the fight by decision.

Kasperski fought Aleksei Dmitriev during DSF Kickboxing Challenge 14. He won the fight by unanimous decision.

He made his Glory debut against Yousri Belgaroui during Glory 53. Belgaroui won the fight by a second-round TKO.

== Mixed martial arts career ==
After a successful debut at KSW 91: Brichta vs. Mircea against Vasil Ducar, defeating him via unanimous decision, at the end of July 2024, it was announced that Kasperski would face former boxer Krzysztof Głowacki on September 14 at KSW 98: Paczuski vs. Zerhouni in Lubin. Kasperski won unanimously on the scorecards.

== Titles and accomplishments ==
=== Kickboxing ===
==== Professional ====
- Superkombat Fighting Championship
  - 2014 SUPERKOMBAT World Grand Prix I Tournament winner

==== Amateur ====
- World Association of Kickboxing Organizations
  - 2014 Polish K-1 -86 kg Champion
  - 2013 WAKO Kick-Box World Cup in Szeged K-1 86 kg (gold)
  - 2013 WAKO World Championships K-1 -86 kg (silver)
  - 2015 WAKO World Championships K-1 -86 kg (bronze)
  - 2016 WAKO European Championships K-1 -86 kg (gold)
- World Games
  - 2017 IWGA World Games Kickboxing Cruiserweight (gold)

=== Awards ===
- 2014 Fightsport Polish Kickboxer of the Year

== Mixed martial arts record ==
Professional record breakdown
4 matches	2 wins	2 losses
By decision	2	2

Res.	Record	Opponent	Method	Event	Date	Round	Time	Location	Notes
Loss	2–2	Aleksander Winiarski	Decision (unanimous)	KSW 118	May 16, 2026	3	5:00	Kalisz, Poland	
Loss	2–1	Bartosz Szewczyk	Decision (split)	KSW 109	August 9, 2025	3	5:00	Warsaw, Poland	
Win	2–0	Krzysztof Głowacki	Decision (unanimous)	KSW 98	September 14, 2024	3	5:00	Lubin, Poland	
Win	1–0	Vasil Ducar	Decision (unanimous)	KSW 91	February 17, 2024	3	5:00	Liberec, Czech Republic	Light Heavyweight debut.

== Kickboxing record ==
Professional kickboxing record
Date	Result	Opponent	Event	Location	Method	Round	Time
2018-05-12	Loss	(Tunisia) Yousri Belgaroui	Glory 53: Lille	Lille, France	TKO (4 knockdowns/front kick to the body)	2	1:16
2018-04-13	Win	(Russia) Aleksei Dmitriev	DSF Kickboxing Challenge 14	Warsaw, Poland	Decision (unanimous)	3	3:00
2017-12-09	Win	(France) Mehdi Bouanane	DSF Kickboxing Challenge 12	Warsaw, Poland	Decision (unanimous)	3	3:00
2017-11-24	Loss	(France) Dylan Colin	-85 kg KFWC savate pro Semi Finals	France	Decision	3	3:00
2017-10-27	Win	(Morocco) Boubaker El Bakouri	DSF Kickboxing Challenge 11	Warsaw, Poland	Decision (unanimous)	3	3:00
2017-06-30	Loss	(France) Gregory Grossi	Monte Carlo Fighting Masters	Monte Carlo, Monaco	Decision	5	3:00
For the vacant W.A.K.O. Pro World Heavyweight K-1 Championship -88.6 kg.
2016-07-31	Win	(Romania) Alexandru Negrea	SUPERKOMBAT World Grand Prix III 2016	Mamaia, Romania	Decision (unanimous)	3	-
2017-04-21	Win	(Slovenia) Adrian Valentin	Perun Fight Night	Trnava, Slovakia	Decision	3	3:00
2015-05-09	Loss	(Estonia) Maxim Vorovski	Xplosion Fight Series	Tallinn, Estonia	Decision	3	3:00
2014-11-22	Loss	(France) Aristote Quitusisa	SUPERKOMBAT World Grand Prix 2014 Final, Semi Finals	Monza, Italy	Decision (split)	3	3:00
2014-10-25	Win	(Morocco) Ibrahim El Bouni	SUPERKOMBAT World Grand Prix 2014 Final Elimination, Quarter Finals	Geneva, Switzerland	Decision (majority)	3	3:00
2014-04-12	Win	(Suriname) Errol Koning	SUPERKOMBAT World Grand Prix I 2014	Reșița, Romania	Decision (split)	3	3:00
Wins the SUPERKOMBAT World Grand Prix I 2014 tournament title.
2014-04-12	Win	(Romania) Ciprian Șchiopu	SUPERKOMBAT World Grand Prix I 2014	Reșița, Romania	Decision (unanimous)	3	3:00
2013-12-14	Win	(Poland) Łukasz Radosz	MFC 6	Zielona Góra, Poland	Decision (unanimous)	3	3:00
2013-12-07	Win	(Poland) Radosław Rydzewski	The Gladiators K-1 Rules II	Polkowice, Poland	Decision	3	3:00
2013-10-19	Win	(Poland) Robert Paniączyk	Thai Battle II	Wrocław, Poland	KO (knee to the liver)	1	2:35
2013-06-29	Win	(Poland) Jarosław Zawodni	The Gladiators K-1 Rules	Wrocław, Poland	Decision	3	3:00
2011-06-10	Loss	(Ukraine) Alexander Oleinik	Masters	Poland	Decision	3	3:00
Legend: Win Loss Draw/no contest Notes

Amateur kickboxing record
Date	Result	Opponent	Event	Location	Method	Round	Time
2017-07-27	Win	(Bosnia and Herzegovina) Mesud Selimović	2017 World Games - Kickboxing Tournament, Final	Wroclaw, Poland	Decision (unanimous)	3	2:00
Wins the 2017 World Games Kickboxing Cruiserweight Gold Medal.
2017-07-26	Win	(Russia) Roman Piatnica	2017 World Games - Kickboxing Tournament, Semifinals	Wroclaw, Poland	Decision (unanimous)	3	2:00
2017-07-26	Win	(United States) Jerome Ward	2017 World Games - Kickboxing Tournament, Quarterfinals	Wroclaw, Poland	KO		
2016-10-29	Win	(Russia) Vitalii Korchak	2016 WAKO European Championships, Final	Maribor, Slovenia	Decision (unanimous)	3	2:00
Wins 2016 WAKO European Championship K-1 -86kg Gold Medal.
2016-10-28	Win	(Russia) Roman Pitanitca	2016 WAKO European Championships, Semifinals	Maribor, Slovenia	Decision (unanimous)	3	2:00
2016-10-27	Win	(Slovenia) Saso Klinc	2016 WAKO European Championships, Quarterfinals	Maribor, Slovenia	Decision (unanimous)	3	2:00
2015-10-30	Loss	(Turkey) Samet Keser	2015 WAKO World Championships, Tournament Semifinals	Belgrade, Serbia	Decision (split)	3	2:00
Wins 2015 WAKO World Championship K-1 -86kg Bronze Medal.
2015-10-29	Win	(Croatia) Ivan Cuklin	2015 WAKO World Championships, Tournament Quarterfinals	Belgrade, Serbia	Decision (unanimous)	3	3:00
2013-10-	Loss	(Russia) Suleyman Magomedov	2013 WAKO World Championships, Tournament Final	Guarujá, Brazil	Decision	3	2:00
Wins 2013 WAKO World Championships K-1 -86kg Silver Medal.
2013-10-	Win	(Serbia) Uroš Bogojevic	2013 WAKO World Championships, Tournament Semifinals	Guarujá, Brazil	Decision	3	2:00
2013-10-	Win	(Israel) Hani Khalil	2013 WAKO World Championships, Tournament Quarterfinals	Guarujá, Brazil	Decision	3	2:00
2013-10-	Win	(Italy) Oleksander Shornikov	2013 WAKO World Championships, Tournament First Round	Guarujá, Brazil	Decision	3	2:00
2012-11-	Loss	(Israel) Hani Khalil	2012 WAKO European Championships, Tournament Quarterfinals	Ankara, Turkey	Decision (split)	3	2:00
2012-11-	Win	(Croatia) Mario Zednik	2012 WAKO European Championships, Tournament First Round	Ankara, Turkey	Decision (unanimous)	3	2:00
Legend: Win Loss Draw/no contest Notes

== See also ==
- List of WAKO Amateur World Championships
- List of male kickboxers
