= Moldova at the 2017 World Games =

Moldova at the World Games 2017
- IOC code: MDA
- NOC: National Olympic Committee of the Republic of Moldova

in Wrocław, Poland 20 July 2017 – 30 July 2017
- Competitors: 4 in 2 sports
- Medals: Gold 1 Silver 0 Bronze 0 Total 1

World Games appearances
- 1981; 1985; 1989; 1993; 1997; 2001; 2005; 2009; 2013; 2017; 2022; 2025

Moldova competed at the World Games 2017 in Wrocław, Poland, from 20 July 2017 to 30 July 2017.

== Competitors ==
| Sports | Men | Women | Total | Events |
|---|---|---|---|---|
| Kickboxing | 2 | 0 | 2 | 2 |
| DanceSport | 2 | 2 | 4 | 2 |
| Total | 4 | 2 | 6 | 4 |

== Kickboxing ==
Moldova has qualified at the 2017 World Games:

- Men's 86kg – 1 quota (Adrian Gologan)
- Men's 91kg – 1 quota (Pavel Voronin)

== Dancesport ==
Moldova has qualified at the 2017 World Games:

- Latin – 1 quota (Gabriele Goffredo & Anna Matus)
- Standard – 1 quota (Dima Kusnir & Valeria Gumeniuc)
