= Ieva Sodeikienė =

Lithuanian dancer

Medal record

Dance sport

Representing Lithuania

The World Games
| Gold medal – first place | 2022 Birmingham | Standard |
| Bronze medal – third place | 2017 Wroclaw | Standard |

World Championships
| Gold medal – first place | 2019 Vilnius | Standard |
| Gold medal – first place | 2021 Brno | Standard |
| Silver medal – second place | 2018 Vienna | Standard |
| Bronze medal – third place | 2014 Vienna | Standard |
| Bronze medal – third place | 2015 Vilnius | Standard |
| Bronze medal – third place | 2016 Aarhus | Standard |
| Bronze medal – third place | 2017 Chengdu | Standard |

European Championships
| Gold medal – first place | 2019 Salaspils | Standard |
| Silver medal – second place | 2018 Copenhagen | Standard |
| Silver medal – second place | 2016 Wroclaw | Standard |
| Silver medal – second place | 2017 Olomouc | Standard |
| Bronze medal – third place | 2015 Cambrils | Standard |

Ieva Žukauskaitė-Sodeikienė (born 24 January 1990) is a Lithuanian ballroom dancer. She is currently dancing with her partner Evaldas Sodeika and competing in the non-professional division.

In the 2014 World Amateur Championships Sodeika/Sodeikienė won bronze medals. During the 2015 European Amateur Championships two Lithuanian amateur couples reached the final for the first time (Sodeika/Sodeikienė and Lacitis/Golodneva). Sodeika and Sodeikienė ended up winning bronze medals.

In 2017, Sodeikienė represented Lithuania in the 2017 World Games and she won the bronze medal in Standard.
