= Kyrgyzstan at the 2017 World Games =

Kyrgyzstan at the World Games 2017
- IOC code: KGZ
- NOC: National Olympic Committee of the Republic of Kyrgyzstan

in Wrocław, Poland 20 July 2017 – 30 July 2017
- Competitors: 4 in 1 sport

World Games appearances
- 1981; 1985; 1989; 1993; 1997; 2001; 2005; 2009; 2013; 2017; 2022; 2025

Kyrgyzstan competed at the World Games 2017 in Wrocław, Poland, from 20 July 2017 to 30 July 2017.

== Competitors ==
Sports	Men	Women	Total	Events
Kickboxing	3	1	4	1
Total	3	1	4	1

== Kickboxing ==
Kyrgyzstan has qualified at the 2017 World Games:

- Men's -63,5 kg - 1 quota (Aleksei Fedoseev)
- Men's -67 kg – 1 quota (Erik Voinov)
- Men's -81 kg – 1 quota (Ruslan Musaev)
- Women's -56 kg – 1 quota (Shakhriza Khalilova)
