= Mexico at the 2017 World Games =

- IOC code: MEX

in Wrocław, Poland 20 July 2017 – 30 July 2017
- Medals: Gold 1 Silver 1 Bronze 3 Total 5

World Games appearances
- 1981; 1985; 1989; 1993; 1997; 2001; 2005; 2009; 2013; 2017; 2022; 2025

Mexico competed at the 2017 World Games held in Wrocław, Poland.

== Archery ==
Rodolfo González and Linda Ochoa won the silver medal in the mixed team compound event.

== Bowling ==
Sandra Góngora and Tannya López won the bronze medal in the women's doubles event.

== Ju-jitsu ==
Dan Schon won the gold medal in the men's ne-waza 85 kg event.

Eduardo Gutiérrez won the bronze medal in the men's fighting 69 kg event.

== Track speed skating ==
Mike Páez won the bronze medal in the men's 10000 metre points elimination event.
