= Evaldas Sodeika =

Lithuanian dancer (born 1989)

Medal record

Dance sport

Representing Lithuania

The World Games
| Gold medal – first place | 2022 Birmingham | Standard |
| Bronze medal – third place | 2017 Wroclaw | Standard |

World Championships
| Gold medal – first place | 2019 Vilnius | Standard |
| Gold medal – first place | 2021 Brno | Standard |
| Silver medal – second place | 2018 Vienna | Standard |
| Bronze medal – third place | 2014 Vienna | Standard |
| Bronze medal – third place | 2015 Vilnius | Standard |
| Bronze medal – third place | 2016 Aarhus | Standard |
| Bronze medal – third place | 2017 Chengdu | Standard |

European Championships
| Gold medal – first place | 2019 Salaspils | Standard |
| Silver medal – second place | 2018 Copenhagen | Standard |
| Silver medal – second place | 2016 Wroclaw | Standard |
| Silver medal – second place | 2017 Olomouc | Standard |
| Bronze medal – third place | 2015 Cambrils | Standard |

Evaldas Sodeika (born 13 March 1989) is a Lithuanian ballroom dancer. He is currently dancing with his partner Ieva Sodeikienė and competing in the non-professional division.

In the 2014 World Amateur Championships Sodeika/Sodeikienė won bronze medals. During the 2015 European Amateur Championships, two Lithuanian amateur couples reached the final for the first time (Sodeika/Sodeikienė and Lacitis/Golodneva). Sodeika and Sodeikienė ended up winning bronze medals.

Sodeika won the bronze medal in the 2017 World Games in Wrocław, Poland, in Standard.
