= Croatia at the 2017 World Games =

Croatia at the World Games 2017
- IOC code: CRO
- NOC: Croatian Olympic Committee

in Wrocław, Poland 20 July 2017 – 30 July 2017
- Competitors: 23 in 8 sports
- Medals: Gold 0 Silver 2 Bronze 2 Total 4

World Games appearances
- 1981; 1985; 1989; 1993; 1997; 2001; 2005; 2009; 2013; 2017; 2022; 2025

Croatia competed at the World Games 2017 in Wrocław, Poland, from 20 July 2017 to 30 July 2017.

== Competitors ==
Sports	Men	Women	Total	Events
Archery	3	0	3	2
Total	3	0	3	2
Boules Sports	1	0	1	1
Total	1	0	1	1

== Beach handball ==
The men's team won the silver medal in the men's tournament.

== Boules Sports ==
Croatia has qualified at the 2017 World Games:

- Lyonnaise Men's Singles Progressive Shooting - 1 quota
