= Slovenia at the 2017 World Games =

Slovenia at the World Games 2017
- IOC code: SLO
- NOC: Slovenian Olympic Committee

in Wrocław, Poland 20 July 2017 – 30 July 2017
- Competitors: 16 (10 Women, 6 Men) in 6 sports

World Games appearances
- 1981; 1985; 1989; 1993; 1997; 2001; 2005; 2009; 2013; 2017; 2022; 2025

Slovenia competed at the 2017 World Games in Wrocław, Poland, from July 20, 2017, to July 30, 2017.

== Competitors ==
Sports	Men	Women	Total	Events
Boules Sports	1	0	1	1
Sport Climbing	0	1	1	1
Total	1	1	2	2

== Boules Sports ==
Slovenia has qualified at the 2017 World Games:

- Lyonnaise Men's Singles Progressive Shooting- 1 quota

== Ju-Jitsu ==
- Benjamin Lah - Tim Toplak - Patricija Delač - Sara Besal

== Muay Thai ==
- Rok Eršte

== Sport Climbing ==
Slovenia has qualified at the 2017 World Games:

- Women's Lead – Mina Markovič, Janja Garnbret
- Men's Lead – Domen Škofic
