= 2017 World Games =

Multi-sport event in Wroclaw, Poland

World Games X X Igrzyska Światowe
- Host city: Wrocław, Poland
- Nations: 102
- Athletes: 3,214
- Events: 199 + 20 invitationals
- Opening: 20 July 2017
- Closing: 30 July 2017
- Opened by: Thomas Bach; President of the IOC
- Main venue: Stadion Miejski
- Website: theworldgames2017.com (archived)

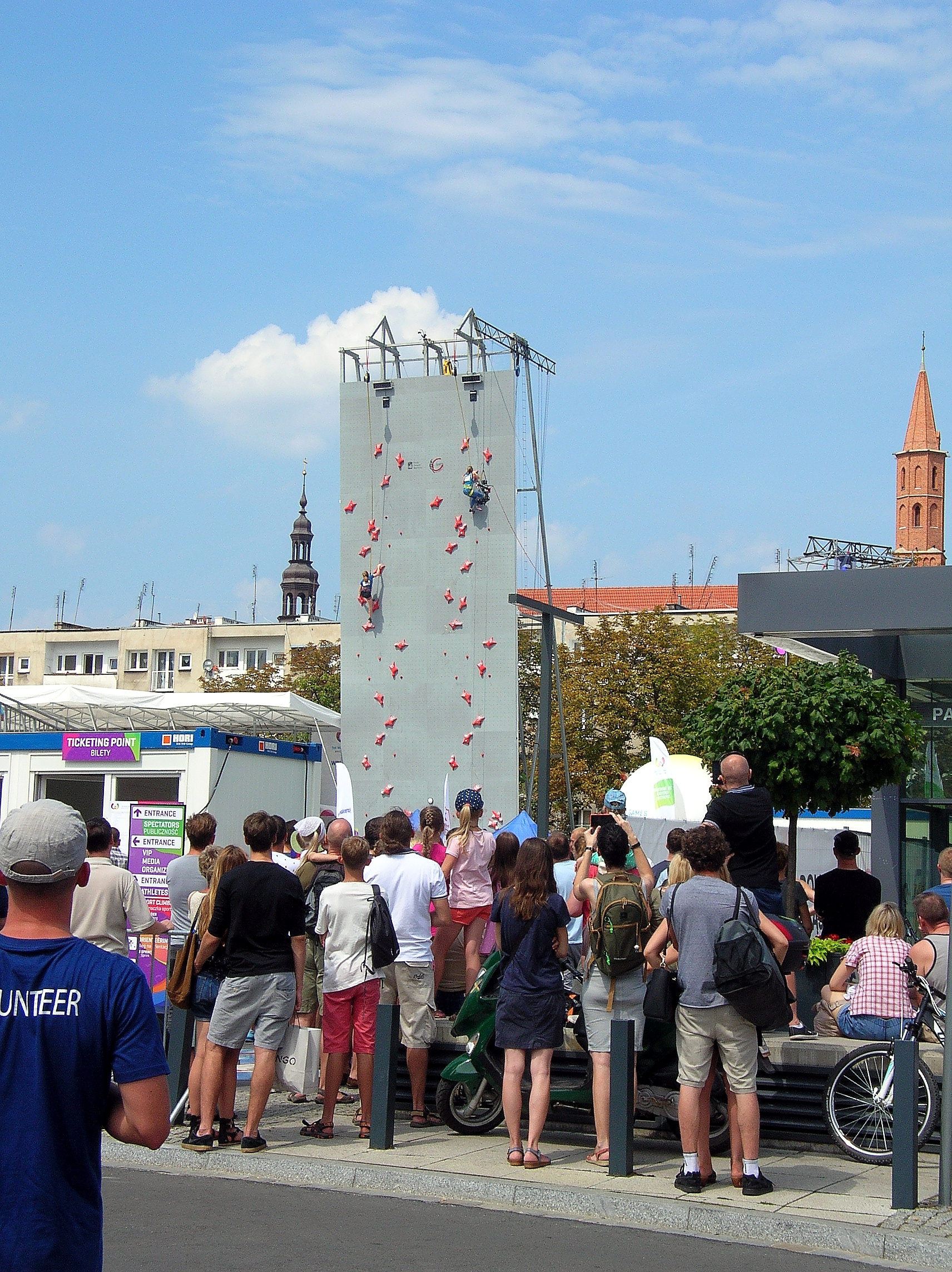
Sport climbing during World Games in Wrocław.

The 2017 World Games (Polish: Igrzyska Światowe 2017), also known as Wrocław 2017, was the tenth edition of the World Games, held from 20 to 30 July 2017 in Wrocław, Poland. The World Games were organized by the Wrocław Organizing Committee. Wrocław was selected as the host city in January 2012 in Lausanne, over Budapest, Hungary. It was the first time The World Games was organised in Poland.

Wrocław was the sixth city in Europe after London (1985), Karlsruhe (1989), The Hague (1993), Lahti (1997) and Duisburg (2005) to host The World Games.

A total of 201 events in 27 official sport disciplines were held during the Games. This is the first time that floorball, women's lacrosse, and Muay Thai have been included in The World Games as official sports. Also, a total of 21 events in 4 invitational sports, American football, indoor rowing, kickboxing, and motorcycle speedway were held during the Games.

== Host selection ==
Location of Wrocław, the host city.

Four cities expressed interest in hosting the 2017 Games. After examination of the files, the application of Genoa, Italy was not brought to the next step. The candidate cities were announced by the IWGA in August 2011:

- Budapest, Hungary
- Cape Town, South Africa
- Wrocław, Poland

Just a few days before the awarding ceremony, Cape Town withdrew its bid for financial reasons. The final decision was announced by Ron Froehlich, President of the International World Games Association, on 12 January 2012 in Lausanne. The 10th edition of The World Games was awarded to Wrocław.

== Venues ==
=== West Cluster ===
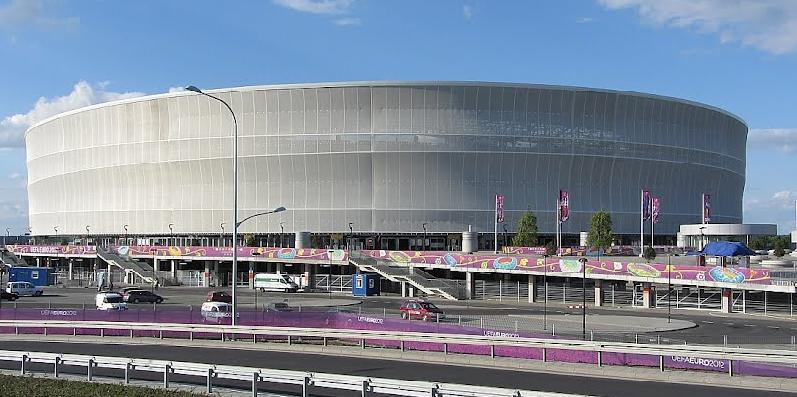
Stadion Miejski, during UEFA Euro 2012

The West Cluster was the main clusters of the games, include the opening ceremony venue, Stadion Miejski, the venue of the 2012 UEFA European Football Championship in Poland and Ukraine.

- Stadion Miejski – opening ceremony, 42,771 spectators
- Millennium Park – roller speed skating
- Orbita Hall – kickboxing, muay thai, 3,000 spectators
- Orbita Swimming Pool – canoe polo, finswimming, lifesaving
- Stara Odra River – waterskiing, wakeboarding

=== Central Cluster ===
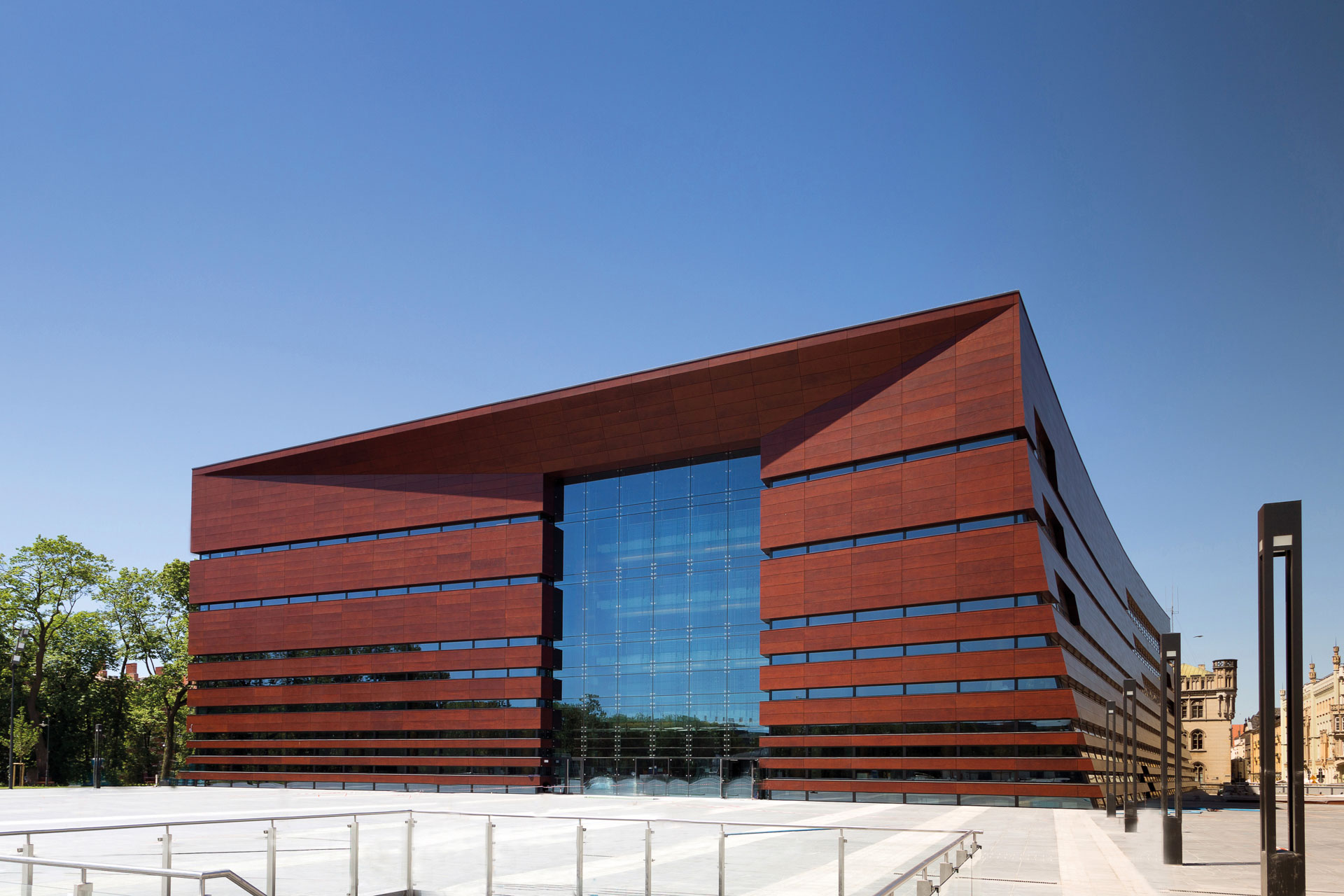
National Forum of Music in Wrocław

- National Forum of Music – closing ceremony, powerlifting, 1,800 spectators
- Nowy Targ Square – orienteering, sport climbing
- Sky Tower Housed – bowling
- Hasta la Vista Sport Club – Squash

=== East Cluster ===
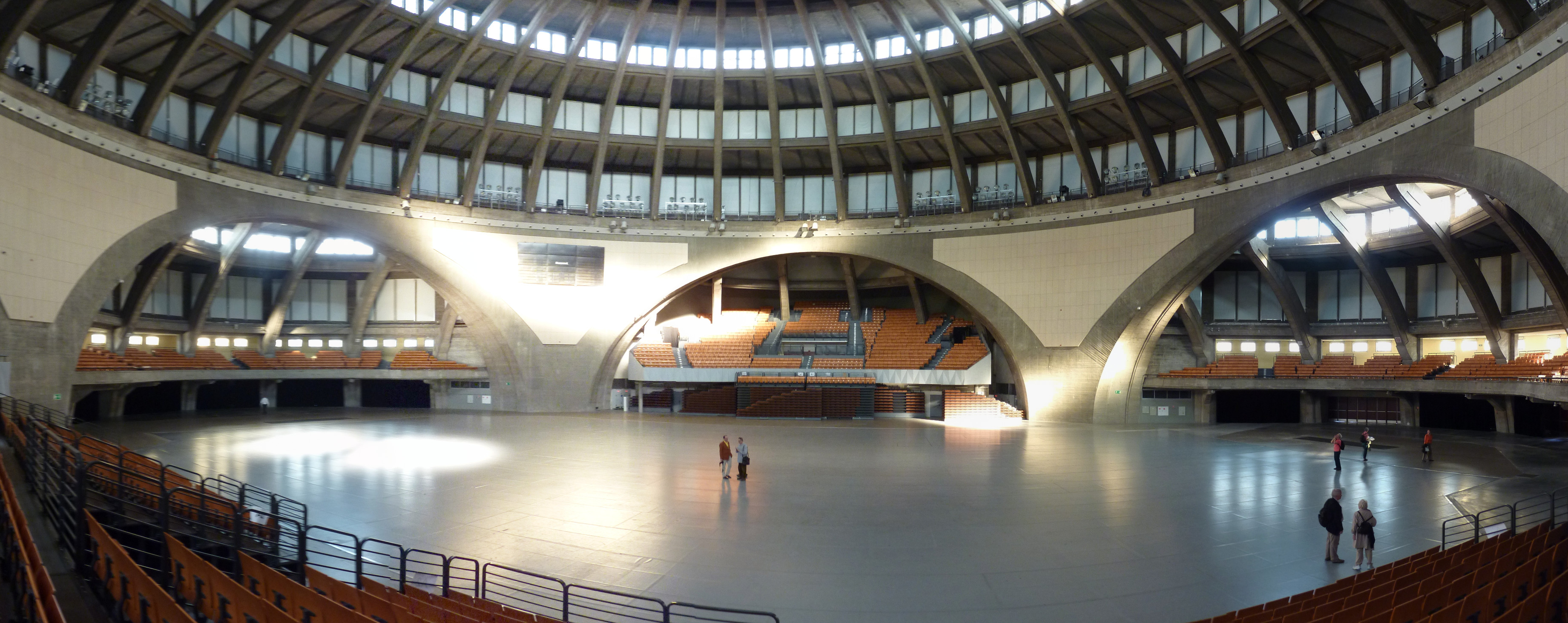
The interior of the Centennial Hall

- Centennial Hall – acrobatic gymnastic, aerobic gymnastics, dancesport, rhythmic gymnastics, trampoline gymnastics, Tumbling, 10,000 spectators
- Wroclaw Congress Center – billiards
- Pergola Centennial Hall – archery, boules sports, orienteering, 10,000 spectators
- Olympic Stadium – American football, motorcycle speedway, 35,000 spectators
- University of Physical Education – tug of war
- Marsowe Fields – tug of war
- P5 Complex – beach handball, flying disc
- WKK Sport Center – floorball, korfball
- Sport Complex GEM – ju-jitsu, karate
- Olawka Stadium – fistball, lacrosse

=== Outside Wrocław ===
- Szymanów Airport, Szymanów – air sports
- Trzebnica Beech Forest, Trzebnica – orienteering
- Świdnica Icerink, Świdnica – artistic roller skating, inline hockey
- Laskowice Sport Complex, Jelcz-Laskowice – indoor rowing

== The events ==
=== Opening ceremony ===
The opening ceremony took place in the Stadion Miejski on 20 July 2017. Artistic conception of the opening Ceremony was implemented by Polish director and TV producer, Krzysztof Materna, who was responsible for the direction of the show, scenario details, artistry, choreography, composition, sound system specialties and all special effects of the ceremony.

The ceremony highlighted aspects of Polish culture and featured the popular singer, Dawid Kwiatkowski, and Radzimir Dębski, Kamil Bednarek, and Steve Nash alongside the Turntable Orchestra. The Games were officially opened by President of International Olympic Committee, Thomas Bach.

=== Sports ===
The 2017 World Games programme featured 27 official sports, and 4 invitational sports encompassing 219 events. This was the first time that floorball, women's lacrosse, and Muay Thai were included in the World Games as official sports, and the first time indoor rowing, kickboxing and motorcycle speedway were included as invitational sports. The numbers in parentheses indicate the number of medal events contested in each sports discipline.

- Acrobatic gymnastics (5) ^{AD}
- Aerobic gymnastics (5) ^{AD}
- Air sports (3) ^{T}
- American football (1) ^{I}
- Archery (7) ^{P}
- Artistic roller skating (4) ^{AD}
- Beach handball (2) ^{B}
- Boules sports (10) ^{P}
- Bowling (4) ^{P}
- Canoe polo (2) ^{B}
- Cue sports (4) ^{P}
- Dancesport (4) ^{AD}
- Finswimming (14) ^{T}
- Fistball (1) ^{B}
- Floorball (1) ^{B}
- Flying disc (1) ^{T}
- Indoor rowing (6) ^{I}
- Inline hockey (1) ^{T}
- Ju-jitsu (22) ^{M}
- Karate (12) ^{M}
- Kickboxing (12) ^{I}
- Korfball (1) ^{B}
- Lacrosse (1) ^{B}
- Lifesaving (16) ^{T}
- Muay Thai (11) ^{M}
- Orienteering (5) ^{T}
- Powerlifting (8) ^{S}
- Rhythmic gymnastics (4) ^{AD}
- Road speed skating (8) ^{T}
- Speedway (1) ^{I}
- Sport climbing (6) ^{T}
- Squash (2) ^{B}
- Sumo (8) ^{M}
- Track speed skating (10) ^{T}
- Trampoline gymnastics (6) ^{AD}
- Tug of war (3) ^{S}
- Water skiing (8) ^{T}

Notes
AD: Artistic and Dance sports
B: Ball sports
I: Invitational sports, selected by the host city
M: Martial arts
P: Precision sports
S: Strength sports
T: Trend sports

=== Participating nations ===
Participating National Olympic Committees
- Algeria (6)
- Argentina (43)
- Australia (118)
- Austria (45)
- Azerbaijan (6)
- Belarus (22)
- Belgium (65)
- Bosnia and Herzegovina (2)
- Brazil (72)
- British Virgin Islands (1)
- Bulgaria (8)
- Canada (78)
- Chile (26)
- China (90)
- Colombia (50)
- Costa Rica (1)
- Ivory Coast (1)
- Croatia (23)
- Cyprus (1)
- Czech Republic (65)
- Denmark (30)
- Dominican Republic (3)
- Ecuador (13)
- Egypt (25)
- El Salvador (1)
- Estonia (7)
- Ethiopia (1)
- Fiji (1)
- Finland (32)
- France (184)
- Georgia (4)
- Germany (189)
- Great Britain (105)
- Greece (12)
- Guatemala (1)
- Hong Kong (9)
- Hungary (57)
- Iceland (1)
- India (4)
- Indonesia (1)
- Iran (19)
- Iraq (1)
- Ireland (23)
- Israel (18)
- Italy (121)
- Japan (96)
- Jordan (5)
- Kazakhstan (16)
- Kyrgyzstan (4)
- Latvia (8)
- Lebanon (2)
- Lithuania (4)
- Madagascar (4)
- Malaysia (8)
- Malta (4)
- Mauritius (3)
- Mexico (21)
- Moldova (8)
- Monaco (2)
- Mongolia (16)
- Montenegro (6)
- Morocco (15)
- Namibia (2)
- Netherlands (81)
- New Zealand (38)
- Nicaragua (1)
- Norway (26)
- Pakistan (3)
- Peru (9)
- Philippines (4)
- Poland (294) (host)
- Portugal (21)
- Puerto Rico (2)
- Qatar (10)
- Romania (19)
- Russia (133)
- San Marino (2)
- Saudi Arabia (1)
- Senegal (3)
- Serbia (8)
- Singapore (4)
- Slovakia (16)
- Slovenia (16)
- South Africa (26)
- South Korea (42)
- Spain (72)
- Sweden (53)
- Switzerland (89)
- Tajikistan (1)
- Chinese Taipei (67)
- Thailand (22)
- Tunisia (14)
- Turkey (13)
- Turkmenistan (1)
- Uganda (2)
- Ukraine (77)
- United Arab Emirates (6)
- United States (190)
- Uruguay (12)
- Uzbekistan (3)
- Venezuela (19)
- Vietnam (6)

=== Closing ceremony ===
The closing ceremony was held on 30 July 2017 at Wolności Square near the National Forum of Music in Wrocław.

== Calendar ==
- All dates are in Central European Summer Time (UTC+02:00)

| OC | Opening ceremony | ● | Event competitions | 1 | Gold medal events | CC | Closing ceremony |

| July | 20 Thu | 21 Fri | 22 Sat | 23 Sun | 24 Mon | 25 Tue | 26 Wed | 27 Thu | 28 Fri | 29 Sat | 30 Sun | Events |
|---|---|---|---|---|---|---|---|---|---|---|---|---|
| Ceremonies | OC | | | | | | | | | | CC | —N/a |
| Acrobatic gymnastics | | | | | 2 | 1 | 2 | | | | | 5 |
| Aerobic gymnastics | | 2 | 3 | | | | | | | | | 5 |
| Air sports | ● | 1 | 2 | | | | | | | | | 3 |
| Archery | | | | ● | ● | 2 | ● | ● | 2 | ● | 3 | 7 |
| Artistic roller skating | | | ● | 4 | | | | | | | | 4 |
| Beach handball | | | | | | | ● | ● | ● | 2 | | 2 |
| Billiard sports | | | | | | | ● | ● | ● | 1 | 3 | 4 |
| Boules sports | | | ● | ● | 12 | | | | | | | 12 |
| Bowling | | 1 | 1 | 1 | 1 | | | | | | | 4 |
| Canoe polo | | | | | | | | | ● | ● | 2 | 2 |
| Dancesport | | | | | | | | | 2 | 2 | | 4 |
| Finswimming | | 7 | 7 | | | | | | | | | 14 |
| Fistball | | | ● | ● | ● | 1 | | | | | | 1 |
| Floorball | | | | | | | | ● | ● | ● | 1 | 1 |
| Flying disc | | ● | ● | 1 | | | | | | | | 1 |
| Inline hockey | | | | | | ● | ● | ● | ● | 1 | | 1 |
| Ju-jitsu | | | | | | | | | 12 | 10 | | 22 |
| Karate | | | | | | 6 | 6 | | | | | 12 |
| Korfball | | ● | ● | ● | ● | 1 | | | | | | 1 |
| Lacrosse | | | | | | | | ● | ● | ● | 1 | 1 |
| Lifesaving | | 8 | 8 | | | | | | | | | 16 |
| Muay Thai | | | | | | | | | ● | ● | 11 | 11 |
| Orienteering | | | | | | 2 | 2 | 1 | | | | 5 |
| Powerlifting | | | | | 3 | 3 | 2 | | | | | 8 |
| Rhythmic gymnastics | | 2 | 2 | | | | | | | | | 4 |
| Road speed skating | | | | | 4 | 4 | | | | | | 8 |
| Sport climbing | | | 2 | 2 | 2 | | | | | | | 6 |
| Squash | | | | | | ● | ● | ● | 2 | | | 2 |
| Sumo | | | 4 | 2 | | | | | | | | 6 |
| Track speed skating | | 2 | 4 | 4 | | | | | | | | 10 |
| Trampoline gymnastics | | | | | 1 | 2 | 3 | | | | | 6 |
| Tug of war | | | | | | | | | | 2 | 1 | 3 |
| Waterskiing | | | | | | ● | 4 | 4 | | | | 8 |
| Daily medal events | | 24 | 34 | 16 | 21 | 23 | 18 | 5 | 18 | 18 | 22 | 199 |
| Cumulative total | | 24 | 58 | 74 | 95 | 118 | 136 | 141 | 159 | 177 | 199 | |
| American football^{1} | | | ● | | 1 | | | | | | | 1 |
| Indoor rowing^{1} | | | | | | | 4 | 2 | | | | 6 |
| Kickboxing^{1} | | | | | | | ● | 12 | | | | 12 |
| Speedway^{1} | | | | | | | | | | 1 | | 1 |
| Daily medal events | | | | | 1 | 0 | 4 | 14 | 0 | 1 | 0 | 20 |
| Cumulative total | | | | | 1 | 1 | 5 | 19 | 19 | 20 | 20 | |
| July | 20 Thu | 21 Fri | 22 Sat | 23 Sun | 24 Mon | 25 Tue | 26 Wed | 27 Thu | 28 Fri | 29 Sat | 30 Sun | Events |

Note

^{1} Invitational sports selected by the host organizing committee

== Medal table ==
=== Medal design ===
Wrocław's medal design was unveiled in July 2017. The official sports medals were a diameter of eight centimetres, larger than the invitation sports medals which were a diameter of six centimetres. The face of the medals features The World Games logo, while the reverse displays original work by Professor Mateusz Dworski. In the centre of the medal is a globe containing the image of the Wrocław City Hall building. The medals were designed by Dworski, a lecturer at the Academy of Fine Arts in Wrocław, and were produced by the Polish National Mint.

This is the table of the medal count of the 2017 World Games, based on the medal count of the International World Games Committee (IWGA). These rankings sort by the number of gold medals, earned by a National Olympic Committee (NOC). The number of silver medals is taken into consideration next and then the number of bronze medals. If, after the above, countries are still tied, equal ranking is given and they are listed alphabetically by IWGA Country Code. Although this information is provided by the IWGA, the IWGA itself does not recognize or endorse any ranking system.

=== Official sports ===
The final medal table:

* Host nation (Poland)

| Rank | Nation | Gold | Silver | Bronze | Total |
|---|---|---|---|---|---|
| 1 | Russia (RUS) | 28 | 21 | 14 | 63 |
| 2 | Germany (GER) | 17 | 10 | 14 | 41 |
| 3 | Italy (ITA) | 16 | 13 | 13 | 42 |
| 4 | France (FRA) | 14 | 14 | 15 | 43 |
| 5 | Ukraine (UKR) | 10 | 7 | 9 | 26 |
| 6 | Colombia (COL) | 9 | 11 | 1 | 21 |
| 7 | Japan (JPN) | 9 | 6 | 7 | 22 |
| 8 | China (CHN) | 8 | 7 | 5 | 20 |
| 9 | United States (USA) | 7 | 10 | 5 | 22 |
| 10 | Belgium (BEL) | 7 | 9 | 8 | 24 |
| 11 | Hungary (HUN) | 6 | 4 | 4 | 14 |
| 12 | Denmark (DEN) | 6 | 0 | 0 | 6 |
| 13 | Poland (POL)* | 5 | 6 | 9 | 20 |
| 14 | Belarus (BLR) | 4 | 2 | 5 | 11 |
| 14 | Sweden (SWE) | 4 | 2 | 5 | 11 |
| 16 | Brazil (BRA) | 4 | 2 | 2 | 8 |
| 17 | Switzerland (SUI) | 3 | 8 | 3 | 14 |
| 18 | South Korea (KOR) | 3 | 6 | 3 | 12 |
| 19 | Australia (AUS) | 3 | 5 | 6 | 14 |
| 20 | Thailand (THA) | 3 | 5 | 2 | 10 |
| 21 | Spain (ESP) | 3 | 4 | 7 | 14 |
| 22 | Great Britain (GBR) | 3 | 4 | 4 | 11 |
| 23 | Argentina (ARG) | 3 | 1 | 2 | 6 |
| 24 | Iran (IRI) | 2 | 8 | 1 | 11 |
| 25 | Netherlands (NED) | 2 | 2 | 2 | 6 |
| 26 | Czech Republic (CZE) | 2 | 1 | 4 | 7 |
| 27 | Austria (AUT) | 2 | 1 | 2 | 5 |
| 28 | Chinese Taipei (TPE) | 1 | 4 | 3 | 8 |
| 29 | Canada (CAN) | 1 | 3 | 2 | 6 |
| 30 | Mexico (MEX) | 1 | 1 | 3 | 5 |
| 31 | Chile (CHI) | 1 | 1 | 2 | 4 |
| 32 | Mongolia (MGL) | 1 | 1 | 1 | 3 |
| 32 | United Arab Emirates (UAE) | 1 | 1 | 1 | 3 |
| 34 | Azerbaijan (AZE) | 1 | 1 | 0 | 2 |
| 35 | Turkey (TUR) | 1 | 0 | 3 | 4 |
| 36 | Kazakhstan (KAZ) | 1 | 0 | 2 | 3 |
| 37 | Morocco (MAR) | 1 | 0 | 1 | 2 |
| 37 | Peru (PER) | 1 | 0 | 1 | 2 |
| 39 | Algeria (ALG) | 1 | 0 | 0 | 1 |
| 39 | Moldova (MDA) | 1 | 0 | 0 | 1 |
| 39 | Philippines (PHI) | 1 | 0 | 0 | 1 |
| 39 | Serbia (SRB) | 1 | 0 | 0 | 1 |
| 39 | Vietnam (VIE) | 1 | 0 | 0 | 1 |
| 44 | Slovenia (SLO) | 0 | 4 | 2 | 6 |
| 45 | Venezuela (VEN) | 0 | 3 | 3 | 6 |
| 46 | Croatia (CRO) | 0 | 2 | 1 | 3 |
| 46 | Egypt (EGY) | 0 | 2 | 1 | 3 |
| 48 | Israel (ISR) | 0 | 1 | 5 | 6 |
| 49 | Finland (FIN) | 0 | 1 | 2 | 3 |
| 50 | Hong Kong (HKG) | 0 | 1 | 1 | 2 |
| 50 | Romania (ROU) | 0 | 1 | 1 | 2 |
| 52 | Greece (GRE) | 0 | 1 | 0 | 1 |
| 52 | Jordan (JOR) | 0 | 1 | 0 | 1 |
| 52 | San Marino (SMR) | 0 | 1 | 0 | 1 |
| 55 | Portugal (POR) | 0 | 0 | 3 | 3 |
| 56 | New Zealand (NZL) | 0 | 0 | 2 | 2 |
| 57 | Dominican Republic (DOM) | 0 | 0 | 1 | 1 |
| 57 | Lithuania (LTU) | 0 | 0 | 1 | 1 |
| 57 | Malaysia (MAS) | 0 | 0 | 1 | 1 |
| 57 | Montenegro (MNE) | 0 | 0 | 1 | 1 |
| 57 | Qatar (QAT) | 0 | 0 | 1 | 1 |
| 57 | Slovakia (SVK) | 0 | 0 | 1 | 1 |
| 57 | South Africa (RSA) | 0 | 0 | 1 | 1 |
| Totals (63 entries) | | 199 | 199 | 199 | 597 |

=== Invitation sports ===
* Host nation (Poland)

| Rank | Nation | Gold | Silver | Bronze | Total |
|---|---|---|---|---|---|
| 1 | Ukraine (UKR) | 5 | 2 | 0 | 7 |
| 2 | Poland (POL)* | 4 | 3 | 3 | 10 |
| 3 | Serbia (SRB) | 2 | 2 | 0 | 4 |
| 4 | Russia (RUS) | 2 | 0 | 1 | 3 |
| 5 | France (FRA) | 2 | 0 | 0 | 2 |
| 6 | Austria (AUT) | 1 | 1 | 1 | 3 |
| 7 | Germany (GER) | 1 | 1 | 0 | 2 |
| 7 | Turkey (TUR) | 1 | 1 | 0 | 2 |
| 9 | Czech Republic (CZE) | 1 | 0 | 0 | 1 |
| 9 | Netherlands (NED) | 1 | 0 | 0 | 1 |
| 11 | Bulgaria (BUL) | 0 | 2 | 0 | 2 |
| 11 | Great Britain (GBR) | 0 | 2 | 0 | 2 |
| 13 | Sweden (SWE) | 0 | 1 | 2 | 3 |
| 14 | Slovakia (SVK) | 0 | 1 | 1 | 2 |
| 15 | Australia (AUS) | 0 | 1 | 0 | 1 |
| 15 | Bosnia and Herzegovina (BIH) | 0 | 1 | 0 | 1 |
| 15 | Canada (CAN) | 0 | 1 | 0 | 1 |
| 15 | Mexico (MEX) | 0 | 1 | 0 | 1 |
| 19 | Thailand (THA) | 0 | 0 | 2 | 2 |
| 19 | United States (USA) | 0 | 0 | 2 | 2 |
| 21 | Belarus (BLR) | 0 | 0 | 1 | 1 |
| 21 | China (CHN) | 0 | 0 | 1 | 1 |
| 21 | Croatia (CRO) | 0 | 0 | 1 | 1 |
| 21 | Hungary (HUN) | 0 | 0 | 1 | 1 |
| 21 | Iran (IRI) | 0 | 0 | 1 | 1 |
| 21 | Israel (ISR) | 0 | 0 | 1 | 1 |
| 21 | Moldova (MDA) | 0 | 0 | 1 | 1 |
| 21 | Morocco (MAR) | 0 | 0 | 1 | 1 |
| Totals (28 entries) | | 20 | 20 | 20 | 60 |

== Broadcasting ==
Olympic Channel

- Germany – Sport1
- Italy – Sportitalia
- Poland – Polsat
- Russia – Match TV
- Ukraine – UA:First

== Marketing ==
=== Mascots ===
The official mascots of the 2017 World Games are a boy and a girl named 'Hansel and Gretel', named after the popular fairy tale and townhouses in Wroclaw. The duo were selected from a nationwide voting in February 2015, and were chosen in November 2015. They symbolise Wroclaw as a place of positive meetings.

=== Sponsors ===
Sponsors of the 2017 World Games
Sponsors
- Kaufland
- Staropolanka
- Tyskie
- Tissot
Supporters
- LOT Polish Airlines
- Stadion Wrocław
- Trans Dan
- Kirosystem Life
- Lower Silesian Railways
- Wrocław Airport
- National Forum of Music

| Preceded by Cali | World Games; Wrocław; X World Games (2017) | Succeeded by Birmingham |
