= Muaythai at the 2017 World Games =

- The pictogram of muaythai.
- Venue: Orbita Hall
- Dates: 28–30 July 2017
- No. of events: 11
- Competitors: 87 from 37 nations

The muaythai (Note: Muaythai is the official name of Muay Thai, recognized by International World Games Association and International Olympic Committee.) tournaments at the 2017 World Games in Wrocław, Poland was held from 28 to 30 July 2017 at the Orbita Hall. It was the first time of muaythai including in the World Games. 87 Muay Thai practitioners from 37 NOCs were featured competing in eleven weight categories; four eight men, and three for women.

== Competition schedule ==
All times are in local time (UTC+2), according to the official schedule. This schedule may be subject to change in due time.

Legend
QF	Quarterfinals	SF	Semifinals	F	Finals

M = Morning session, A = Afternoon session, E = Evening session

Date →	Jul 28			Jul 29			Jul 30		
Event ↓	M	A	E	M	A	E	M	A	E
Men's 54 kg		QF			SF		F		
Men's 57 kg		QF			SF		F		
Men's 63.5 kg		QF			SF			F	
Men's 67 kg			QF		SF		F		
Men's 71 kg			QF		SF		F		
Men's 75 kg			QF		SF		F		
Men's 81 kg			QF		SF			F	
Men's 91 kg			QF		SF		F		
Women's 51 kg		QF			SF			F	
Women's 54 kg		QF			SF		F		
Women's 60 kg		QF			SF		F		

== Medal table ==
* Host nation (Poland)

Rank	Nation	Gold	Silver	Bronze	Total
1	Ukraine	3	1	0	4
2	Thailand	2	1	1	4
3	Russia	1	3	2	6
4	Sweden	1	1	0	2
5	Belarus	1	0	1	2
5	Kazakhstan	1	0	1	2
5	Turkey	1	0	1	2
8	Vietnam	1	0	0	1
9	Iran	0	2	0	2
10	Poland*	0	1	1	2
11	Finland	0	1	0	1
11	Spain	0	1	0	1
13	Czech Republic	0	0	1	1
13	Israel	0	0	1	1
13	Peru	0	0	1	1
13	United States	0	0	1	1
Totals (16 entries)		11	11	11	33

== Medal summary ==
=== Men ===
Event	Gold	Silver	Bronze
– 54 kg	Elaman Sayasatov; Kazakhstan	Kevin Martinez; Spain	Aslanbek Zikreev; Russia
– 57 kg	Wiwat Khamtha; Thailand	Aleksandr Abramov; Russia	Almaz Sarsembekov; Kazakhstan
– 63.5 kg	Igor Liubchenko; Ukraine	Ali Zarinfar; Iran	Oskar Siegert; Poland
– 67 kg	Serhii Kuliaba; Ukraine	Vladimir Kuzmin; Russia	Anueng Khatthamarasri; Thailand
– 71 kg	Suppachai Muensang; Thailand	Masoud Minaei; Iran	Gabrielle David Mazzetti; Peru
– 75 kg	Vital Hurkou; Belarus	Vasyl Sorokin; Ukraine	Ivan Grigorev; Russia
– 81 kg	Ali Doğan; Turkey	Constantino Nanga; Sweden	Mikita Shostak; Belarus
– 91 kg	Oleh Pryimachov; Ukraine	Łukasz Radosz; Poland	Jakub Klauda; Czech Republic

=== Women ===
Event	Gold	Silver	Bronze
– 51 kg	Bùi Yến Ly; Vietnam	Apasara Koson; Thailand	Janet Todd; United States
– 54 kg	Sofia Olofsson; Sweden	Valeriya Drozdova; Russia	Meltem Baş; Turkey
– 60 kg	Svetlana Vinnikova; Russia	Gia Winberg; Finland	Nili Block; Israel

== Participating nations ==
The following National Olympic Committees earned spots to compete, with the number of athletes in parentheses. 87 athletes from 37 NOCs are expected to participate. Poland was the only delegation to qualify the maximum number of entries (11 athletes total).

- Austria (1)
- Belarus (6)
- Bulgaria (1)
- Canada (1)
- China (1)
- Chinese Taipei (1)
- Cyprus (1)
- Czech Republic (2)
- Finland (1)
- France (3)
- Germany (1)
- Iran (3)
- Iraq (1)
- Israel (1)
- Italy (1)
- Jordan (1)
- Kazakhstan (4)
- Lebanon (1)
- Malaysia (2)
- Mexico (1)
- Morocco (3)
- New Zealand (1)
- Peru (3)
- Philippines (1)
- Poland (11)
- Portugal (2)
- Russia (6)
- Slovenia (1)
- South Africa (1)
- South Korea (1)
- Spain (2)
- Sweden (3)
- Thailand (5)
- Turkey (3)
- Ukraine (6)
- United States (2)
- Vietnam (2)
