= Ukraine at the 2017 World Games =

Ukraine at the World Games 2017
- IOC code: UKR
- NOC: National Olympic Committee of Ukraine

in Wrocław, Poland 20 July 2017 – 30 July 2017
- Competitors: 77 in 20 sports
- Medals Ranked 5th: Gold 10 Silver 7 Bronze 9 Total 26

World Games appearances (overview)
- 1993; 1997; 2001; 2005; 2009; 2013; 2017; 2022; 2025

Ukraine competed at the World Games 2017 in Wrocław, Poland, from 20 July 2017 to 30 July 2017.

== Medalists ==
=== Main programme ===
Medal	Name	Sport	Event	Date
Gold	Bohdan Mochulskyi	Ju-jitsu	Men's fighting 62 kg	July 28
Gold	Stanislav Horuna	Karate	Men's kumite 75 kg	July 26
Gold	Igor Liubchenko	Muaythai	Men's 63.5 kg	July 30
Gold	Serhii Kuliaba	Muaythai	Men's 67 kg	July 30
Gold	Oleh Pryimachov	Muaythai	Men's 91 kg	July 30
Gold	Sergii Bilyi	Powerlifting	Men's heavyweight	July 25
Gold	Oleksii Rokochiy	Powerlifting	Men's super heavyweight	July 26
Gold	Larysa Soloviova	Powerlifting	Women's middleweight	July 24
Gold	Svitlana Trosiuk	Sumo	Women's lightweight	July 22
Gold	Nataliia Moskvina; Svitlana Malkova	Trampoline gymnastics	Women's synchronized trampoline	July 26
Silver	Anita Serogina	Karate	Women's kumite 61 kg	July 26
Silver	Vasyl Sorokin	Muaythai	Men's 75 kg	July 30
Silver	Volodymyr Rysiev	Powerlifting	Men's middleweight	July 25
Silver	Tetyana Melnyk	Powerlifting	Women's super heavyweight	July 26
Silver	Danylo Boldyrev	Sport climbing	Men's speed	July 22
Silver	Ivanna Berezovska	Sumo	Women's openweight	July 23
Silver	Mykola Prostorov; Dmytro Byedyevkin	Trampoline gymnastics	Men's synchronized trampoline	July 24
Bronze	Veronika Habelok; Irina Nazimova	Acrobatic gymnastics	Women's pairs all-around	July 24
Bronze	Daria Kovalova	Bowling	Women's single	July 21
Bronze	Kateryna Dyelova	Finswimming	Women's 50 m apnoea	July 21
Bronze	Iryna Pikiner	Finswimming	Women's 100 m bi-fins	July 22
Bronze	Anastasiia Antoniak	Finswimming	Women's 200 m surface	July 21
Bronze	Anastasiia Antoniak	Finswimming	Women's 400 m surface	July 22
Bronze	Andriy Naniev	Powerlifting	Men's middleweight	July 25
Bronze	Dmytro Semenenko	Powerlifting	Men's heavyweight	July 25
Bronze	Maryna Maksymenko	Sumo	Women's middleweight	July 22

=== Invitational sports ===
Medal	Name	Sport	Event	Date
Gold	Anton Bondarenko	Indoor rowing	Men's open 500 metres	July 27
Gold	Olena Buryak	Indoor rowing	Women's open 500 metres	July 27
Gold	Olena Buryak	Indoor rowing	Women's open 2000 metres	July 26
Gold	Orfan Sananzade	Kickboxing	Men's light welterweight	July 27
Gold	Vitalii Dubina	Kickboxing	Men's light middleweight	July 27
Silver	Anton Bondarenko	Indoor rowing	Men's open 2000 metres	July 26
Silver	Roman Holovatiuk	Kickboxing	Men's super heavyweight	July 27

== Competitors ==
Sports	Men	Women	Total
Acrobatic gymnastics	0	8	8
Aerobic gymnastics	4	2	6
Air sports	1	0	1
Bowling	0	2	2
Dancesport	1	1	2
Finswimming	0	5	5
Indoor rowing	1	1	2
Aerobic gymnastics	2	0	2
Karate	1	2	3
Kickboxing	4	1	5
Muaythai	5	1	6
Orienteering	2	2	4
Powerlifting	6	4	10
Rhythmic gymnastics	—N/a	2	2
Aerobic gymnastics	1	0	1
Squash	1	2	3
Sumo	4	4	8
Trampoline gymnastics	3	3	6
Water skiing	1	0	1
Total	37	40	77

=== Rhythmic Gymnastics ===
Ukraine qualified at the 2017 World Games in:

- Women's individual event - 1 quota

=== Trampoline ===
Ukraine qualified at the 2017 World Games in:

- Men's Individual Tumbling - 1 quota
- Men's Synchronized Trampoline - 1 quota
- Women's Individual Tumbling - 1 quota
- Women's Synchronized Trampoline - 1 quota

== Acrobatic gymnastics ==
Athletes	Event	Qualification						Final	
Athletes	Event	Balance exercise		Dynamic exercise		Total		Final exercise	
Athletes	Event	Result	Rank	Result	Rank	Result	Rank	Result	Rank
Yurii Push; Taras Yarush; Stanislav Kukurudz; Vladyslav Kukurudz	Men's groups	24.590	4	27.740	4	52.330	5	Did not advance	
Veronika Habelok; Irina Nazimova	Women's pairs	26.110	4	27.250	3	53.360	4 Q	27.930	3rd place, bronze medalist(s)

== Ju-jitsu ==
Men

Athlete	Event	Group stage			Semifinals	Final/Bronze medal bout	
Athlete	Event	Opposition Result	Opposition Result	Rank	Opposition Result	Opposition Result	Rank
Bohdan Mochulskyi	62 kg	Cloots (BEL); W 11–10	Markov (BUL); L 7–17	2 Q	Apolonov (GER); W 14–6	Viviescas Ortíz (COL); W 9–8	1st place, gold medalist(s)
Ivan Nastenko	85 kg	Willard (DEN); L 5–7	Cabezas Quiñones (COL); L 11–11	3	Did not advance		

== Karate ==
Ukraine won its first medals in the sport. Serogina competed at her second World Games.

Men

Athlete	Event	Group stage				Semifinals	Final/Bronze medal bout	
Athlete	Event	Opposition Result	Opposition Result	Opposition Result	Rank	Opposition Result	Opposition Result	Rank
Stanislav Horuna	75 kg	Scott (USA); W 6–1	Boguszewski (POL); W 6–0	Ainazarov (KAZ); W 4–0	1 Q	Veríssimo (BRA); W 4–1	Asiabari (IRI); W 4–2	1st place, gold medalist(s)

Women

Athlete	Event	Group stage				Semifinals	Final/Bronze medal bout	
Athlete	Event	Opposition Result	Opposition Result	Opposition Result	Rank	Opposition Result	Opposition Result	Rank
Kateryna Kryva	50 kg	Özçelik (TUR); D 0–0	Plank (AUT); L 0–1	Recchia (FRA); L 0–1	4	Did not advance		
Anita Serogina	61 kg	Grande (PER); D 0–0	Mah (AUS); W 5–0	No other competitor	1 Q	Gradowska (POL); W 2–0	Grande (PER); L 0–2	2nd place, silver medalist(s)

== Kickboxing ==
Ukraine became the third most successful team in the sport behind host Poland and Serbia.

Men

Athlete	Event	Quarterfinals	Semi-finals	Final/Bronze medal bout	
Athlete	Event	Opposition Result	Opposition Result	Opposition Result	Rank
Orfan Sananzade	63.5 kg	Aceves Martinez (MEX); W 2–1	Deskaj (CRO); W 2–1	Konovalov (SRB); W 2–1	1st place, gold medalist(s)
Yurii Peretiatko	67 kg	Amni (IRI); W 3–0	Hinds (CAN); L 1–2	Kazieczko (POL); L WO	4
Vitalii Dubina	71 kg	Khalaf Hasan (UAE); W 3–0	Gershon (ISR); W 2–1	Shumarov (BUL); W 3–0	1st place, gold medalist(s)
Roman Holovatiuk	+91 kg	Polugić (SRB); W 3–0	Inocente (BRA); L 0–3	Turyński (POL); W WO	2nd place, silver medalist(s)

Women

Athlete	Event	Quarterfinals	Semi-finals	Final/Bronze medal bout	
Athlete	Event	Opposition Result	Opposition Result	Opposition Result	Rank
Natalia Martiukhina	60 kg	Ponomareva (RUS); W 3–0	Martínez Aceves (MEX); L 1–2	Tabit (MAR); L 0–3	4

== Muaythai ==
Ukrainian team was second largest team behind host Poland. The team became the most successful one at the Games.

Men

Athlete	Event	Quarterfinals	Semifinals	Final/Bronze medal bout	
Athlete	Event	Opposition Result	Opposition Result	Opposition Result	Rank
Konstiantyn Trishyn	57 kg	Bin Kamarrudin (MAS); W WO	Abramov (RUS); L 27–30	Sarsembekov (KAZ); L RSC-B	4
Igor Liubchenko	63.5 kg	Galiyev (KAZ); W RSC-OC	Ondash (LBN); W RSC-OC	Zarinfar (IRI); W 30–27	1st place, gold medalist(s)
Serhii Kuliaba	67 kg	Al-Qaysi (IRQ); W RSC-OC	Khatthamarasri (THA); W 29–28	Kuzmin (RUS); W 29–28	1st place, gold medalist(s)
Vasyl Sorokin	75 kg	Yongkang (CHN); W 30–27	Grigorev (RUS); W 29–28	Hurkou (BLR); L 28–29	2nd place, silver medalist(s)
Oleh Pryimachov	91 kg	Erste (SLO); W RSC-1	Styben (GER); W 30–27	Radosz (POL); W WO	1st place, gold medalist(s)

Women

Athlete	Event	Quarterfinals	Semi-finals	Final/Bronze medal bout	
Athlete	Event	Opposition Result	Opposition Result	Opposition Result	Rank
Anastasiia Mykhailenko	60 kg	Winberg (FIN); L 27–30	Did not advance		

== Orienteering ==
Ukraine entered the maximum number of competitors.

Men

Athlete	Event	Time	Rank
Ruslan Glebov	Sprint	14:58.50	4
Ruslan Glebov	Middle distance	36:10	8
Oleksandr Kratov	Sprint	16:54.90	35
Oleksandr Kratov	Middle distance	36:07	6

Women

Athlete	Event	Time	Rank
Kateryna Dzema	Sprint	16:18.50	24
Kateryna Dzema	Middle distance	47:47	33
Nadiya Volynska	Sprint	DSQ	
Nadiya Volynska	Middle distance	37:31	9

Mixed

Athlete	Event	Time	Rank
Kateryna Dzema; Oleksandr Kratov; Ruslan Glebov; Nadiya Volynska	Mixed team relay	1:06:06	9

== Squash ==
Ukraine debuted in the sport.

Athlete	Event	Round of 32	Round of 16	Quarterfinals	Semi-finals	Final / BM	
Athlete	Event	Opposition Score	Opposition Score	Opposition Score	Opposition Score	Opposition Score	Rank
Konstiantyn Rybalchenko	Men's singles	Tsz Fung (HKG); L 0–3	Did not advance				
Alina Bushma	Women's singles	Chan (HKG); L 0–3	Did not advance				
Nadiia Usenko	Women's singles	Moverley (GBR); L 0–3	Did not advance				

== Trampoline gymnastics ==
Athlete	Event	Qualification		Final	
Athlete	Event	Score	Rank	Score	Rank
Mykola Prostorov; Dmytro Byedyevkin	Men's synchronised	86.450	5 Q	51.200	2nd place, silver medalist(s)
Stanislav Podostroiets	Men's tumbling	66.100	8 Q	54.600	8
Nataliia Moskvina; Svitlana Malkova	Women's synchronised	84.150	7 Q	48.100	1st place, gold medalist(s)
Kateryna Bayeva	Women's tumbling	48.200	10	Did not advance	
