= Water skiing at the 2017 World Games – Men's tricks =

Water skiing - Men's Tricks at the 2017 World Games
- Venue: Old Odra River, Wrocław, Poland
- Dates: 25–26 July 2017
- Competitors: 11 from 11 nations

Medalists
gold medal	(Australia) Josh Briant
silver medal	(France) Pierre Ballon
bronze medal	(Belgium) Olivier Fortamps

The men's tricks competition in water skiing at the 2017 World Games took place from 25 to 26 July 2017 at the Old Odra River in Wrocław, Poland.

== Competition format ==
A total of 11 athletes entered the competition. From qualifications the best 8 skiers qualify to final.

== Results ==
=== Qualifications ===
Rank	Athlete	Nation	Result	Note
1	Josh Briant	Australia	10510	Q
2	Martin Kolman	Czech Republic	9450	Q
3	Nikolas Plytas	Greece	9140	Q
4	Aliaksei Zharnasek	Belarus	8660	Q
5	Nicholas Benatti	Italy	8510	Q
6	Pierre Ballon	France	8130	Q
7	Patricio Font	Mexico	7810	Q
8	Olivier Fortamps	Belgium	7800	Q
9	Danylo Filchenko	Ukraine	6940	
10	Adam Pickos	United States	4190	
11	Genadi Guralia	(Georgia (country)) Georgia	2000	

=== Final ===
Rank	Athlete	Nation	Result
1st place, gold medalist(s)	Josh Briant	Australia	10990
2nd place, silver medalist(s)	Pierre Ballon	France	10220
3rd place, bronze medalist(s)	Olivier Fortamps	Belgium	9520
4	Nikolas Plytas	Greece	9200
5	Nicholas Benatti	Italy	8670
6	Patricio Font	Mexico	7650
7	Aliaksei Zharnasek	Belarus	7520
8	Martin Kolman	Czech Republic	4760
