= Orienteering at the 2017 World Games – Women's middle distance =

Orienteering - Women's Middle Distance at the 2017 World Games
- Venue: Trzebnica Aquapark, Wrocław, Poland
- Dates: 26 July 2017
- Competitors: 40 from 23 nations

Medalists
gold medal	(Sweden) Helena Jansson
silver medal	(Russia) Natalia Gemperle
bronze medal	(Switzerland) Sabine Hauswirth

The women's middle-distance competition in orienteering at the 2017 World Games took place on 26 July 2017 at the Trzebnica Aquapark in Wrocław, Poland.

== Competition format ==
A total of 40 athletes entered the competition. Every athlete has to check 30 control points, which are located across the course.

== Schedule ==
All times are local (UTC+2).

Date	Time	Event
Wednesday, 26 July 2019	09:30	Final

== Results ==
Rank	Name	Nationality	Time
1st place, gold medalist(s)	Helena Jansson	Sweden	34:44
2nd place, silver medalist(s)	Natalia Gemperle	Russia	34:47
3rd place, bronze medalist(s)	Sabine Hauswirth	Switzerland	35:54
4	Cecilie Klysner	Denmark	36:25
5	Ida Marie Bjørgul	Norway	36:34
6	Sari Anttonen	Finland	36:55
7	Marika Teini	Finland	37:13
8	Ursula Kadan	Austria	37:29
9	Nadiya Volynska	Ukraine	37:31
10	Elena Roos	Switzerland	38:54
11	Lina Strand	Sweden	39:03
12	Emily Kemp	Canada	39:04
13	Tessa Strain	(United Kingdom) Great Britain	39:10
14	Anastasia Denisova	Belarus	39:30
15	Inga Dambe	Latvia	39:31
16	Andrine Benjaminsen	Norway	39:37
16	Galina Vinogradova	Russia	39:37
18	Isia Basset	France	39:52
19	Susen Losch	Germany	40:02
20	Annika Rihma	Estonia	40:21
21	Laura Ramstein	Austria	41:27
22	Evely Kaasiku	Estonia	41:42
23	Carlotta Scalet-Merl	Italy	41:48
24	Fanni Gyurkó	Hungary	42:29
24	Lauriane Beauvisage	France	42:37
26	Tereza Janošíková	Czech Republic	43:04
27	Laura Robertson	New Zealand	44:17
28	Virág Weiler	Hungary	44:56
29	Kate Morrison	New Zealand	44:57
30	Megan Carter-Davies	(United Kingdom) Great Britain	45:30
31	Weronika Cych	Poland	45:47
32	Aleksandra Hornik	Poland	47:38
33	Kateryna Dzema	Ukraine	47:47
34	Elaine Dalmares Lenz	Brazil	55:41
35	Elmira Moldasheva	Kazakhstan	57:47
36	Tori Owen	Canada	58:39
37	Franciely De Sigueira Chiles	Brazil	1:01:21
38	Wang Ting-hsuan	Chinese Taipei	1:17:06
	Denisa Kosova	Czech Republic	DNS
	Maja Alm	Denmark	DNS
