= Orienteering at the 2017 World Games – Women's sprint =

Orienteering - Women's Sprint at the 2017 World Games
- Venue: City Center, Wrocław, Poland
- Dates: 25 July 2017
- Competitors: 40 from 23 nations

Medalists
| gold medal | (Denmark) Maja Alm |
| silver medal | (Switzerland) Elena Roos |
| bronze medal | (Sweden) Lina Strand |

The women's sprint competition in orienteering at the 2017 World Games took place on 25 July 2017 in the City Center of Wrocław, Poland.

== Competition format ==
A total of 40 athletes entered the competition. Every athlete has to check 21 control points, which are located across the course.

== Schedule ==
All times are local (UTC+2).

| Date | Time | Event |
|---|---|---|
| Tuesday, 25 July 2019 | 10:00 | Final |

== Results ==
| Rank | Name | Nationality | Time |
|---|---|---|---|
| 1st place, gold medalist(s) | Maja Alm | Denmark | 13:59.50 |
| 2nd place, silver medalist(s) | Elena Roos | Switzerland | 14:32.50 |
| 3rd place, bronze medalist(s) | Lina Strand | Sweden | 14:39.80 |
| 4 | Galina Vinogradova | Russia | 14:39.90 |
| 5 | Sabine Hauswirth | Switzerland | 14:45.30 |
| 6 | Helena Jansson | Sweden | 14:51.60 |
| 7 | Anastasia Denisova | Belarus | 14:52.80 |
| 8 | Natalia Gemperle | Russia | 14:54.10 |
| 9 | Cecilie Klysner | Denmark | 14:54.70 |
| 10 | Ida Marie Bjørgul | Norway | 15:07.60 |
| 11 | Laura Robertson | New Zealand | 15:09.20 |
| 12 | Sari Anttonen | Finland | 15:18.60 |
| 13 | Ursula Kadan | Austria | 15:28.40 |
| 14 | Marika Teini | Finland | 15:30.70 |
| 15 | Aleksandra Hornik | Poland | 15:31.50 |
| 16 | Tereza Janošíková | Czech Republic | 15:36.00 |
| 17 | Megan Carter-Davies | (United Kingdom) Great Britain | 15:36.50 |
| 18 | Andrine Benjaminsen | Norway | 15:39.10 |
| 19 | Fanni Gyurkó | Hungary | 15:58.80 |
| 20 | Virág Weiler | Hungary | 15:59.00 |
| 21 | Carlotta Scalet-Merl | Italy | 16:00.10 |
| 22 | Tessa Strain | (United Kingdom) Great Britain | 16:10.20 |
| 23 | Annika Rihma | Estonia | 16:10.50 |
| 24 | Kateryna Dzema | Ukraine | 16:18.50 |
| 24 | Isia Basset | France | 16:18.50 |
| 26 | Laura Ramstein | Austria | 16:20.30 |
| 27 | Evely Kaasiku | Estonia | 16:22.20 |
| 28 | Susen Losch | Germany | 16:24.40 |
| 29 | Inga Dambe | Latvia | 16:27.90 |
| 30 | Denisa Kosová | Czech Republic | 16:31.70 |
| 31 | Weronika Cych | Poland | 16:36.80 |
| 32 | Lauriane Beauvisage | France | 16:44.90 |
| 33 | Kate Morrison | New Zealand | 17:53.30 |
| 34 | Franciely De Sigueira Chiles | Brazil | 18:26.00 |
| 35 | Tori Owen | Canada | 18:37.20 |
| 36 | Elmira Moldasheva | Kazakhstan | 19:25.90 |
| 37 | Wang Ting-hsuan | Chinese Taipei | 19:37.60 |
| 38 | Elaine Dalmares Lenz | Brazil | 20:23.70 |
| | Emily Kemp | Canada | DSQ |
| | Nadiya Volynska | Ukraine | DSQ |
