= Malaysia at the 2017 World Games =

- IOC code: MAS

in Wrocław, Poland 20 July 2017 – 30 July 2017
- Competitors: 8 in 3 sports
- Medals Ranked 57th: Gold 0 Silver 0 Bronze 1 Total 1

World Games appearances (overview)
- 1981; 1985; 1989; 1993; 1997; 2001; 2005; 2009; 2013; 2017; 2022; 2025

Malaysia competed at the 2017 World Games held in Wrocław, Poland.

== Competitors ==
The following is the list of number of competitors in the Games.

| Sport | Men | Women | Total |
|---|---|---|---|
| Archery | 2 | 0 | 2 |
| Muaythai | 2 | 0 | 2 |
| Squash | 2 | 2 | 4 |
| Total | 6 | 2 | 8 |

== Medalists ==
| Medal | Name | Sport | Event |
|---|---|---|---|
| Bronze | Nicol David | Squash | Women's singles |

== Archery ==
Two Malaysian male archer qualified for the men's individual compound event.

| Athlete | Event | Ranking round | | Round of 32 | Round of 16 | Quarterfinals | Semifinals | Final / BM | |
| Athlete | Event | Score | Seed | Opposition Score | Opposition Score | Opposition Score | Opposition Score | Opposition Score | Rank |
|---|---|---|---|---|---|---|---|---|---|
| Juwaidi Mazuki | Men's compound | 699 | 18 | Septimus Cilliers (RSA); L 147–149 | Did not advance | | | | |
| Khambeswaran Mohanaraja | Men's compound | 682 | 23 | Roberto Hernández (ESA); L 136–146 | Did not advance | | | | |

== Muaythai ==
Two Malaysian Muaythai practitioners qualified for the Games.

| Athlete | Event | Quarterfinals | Semifinals | Final/Bronze medal bout | |
| Athlete | Event | Opposition Result | Opposition Result | Opposition Result | Rank |
|---|---|---|---|---|---|
| Mohd Ali Jaakub | 54 kg | Yoon Deok-jae (KOR); L WO | Did not advance | | |
| Ain Kamarrudin | 57 kg | Konstiantyn Trishyn (UKR); L WO | Did not advance | | |

== Squash ==
Four Malaysian squash player qualified for the Games. Nicol David won the bronze medal in the women's singles competition.

| Athlete | Event | Round of 32 | Round of 16 | Quarterfinals | Semi-finals | Final / BM | |
| Athlete | Event | Opposition Score | Opposition Score | Opposition Score | Opposition Score | Opposition Score | Rank |
|---|---|---|---|---|---|---|---|
| Ivan Yuen | Men's singles | Matias Tuomi (FIN); W 11–6, 13–11, 11–8 | Miguel Rodríguez (COL); L 11–4, 2–11, 8–11, 5–11 | Did not advance | | | |
| Nafiizwan Adnan | Men's singles | —N/a | Diego Elías (PER); L 7–11, 11–8, 3–11, 5–11 | Did not advance | | | |
| Nicol David | Women's singles | Irina Beliaeva (RUS); W 11–4, 11–3, 11–3 | Samantha Terán (MEX); W 11–3, 11–6, 11–8 | Nele Gilis (BEL); W 11–9, 12–10, 11–7 | Joey Chan (HKG); L 11–7, 10–12, 11–5, 4–11, 5–11 | Fiona Moverley (GBR); W 11–4, 11–8, 11–3 | 3rd place, bronze medalist(s) |
| Rachel Arnold | Women's singles | Anna Serme (CZE); W 12–10, 11–13, 11–8, 11–6 | Millie Tomlinson (GBR); L 11–7, 9–11, 11–4, 8–11, 13–15 | Did not advance | | | |
