= Indoor rowing at the 2017 World Games – Women's Open 2000 metres =

Women's Open 2000 metres at the 2017 World Games
- Venue: Multifunctional Hall
- Location: Jelcz-Laskowice, Poland
- Dates: 26 July
- Competitors: 9 from 9 nations

Medalists
gold medal	Olena Buryak	Ukraine
silver medal	Cecilia Velin	Sweden
bronze medal	Magdalena Lobnig	Austria

The women's open 2000 metres event in indoor rowing at the 2017 World Games took place on the 26 July 2017 at the Multifunctional Hall in Jelcz-Laskowice.

== Results ==
WR = World Record

Rank	Athlete	NOC	Time	Notes
1st place, gold medalist(s)	Olena Buryak	Ukraine	6:22.8	WR
2nd place, silver medalist(s)	Cecilia Velin	Sweden	6:38.2	
3rd place, bronze medalist(s)	Magdalena Lobnig	Austria	6:40.8	
4	Pavlena Zizkova	Czech Republic	6:52.1	
5	Nicola Lawless	Great Britain	6:58.3	
6	Beatrix Fekete	Hungary	7:03.5	
7	Luisa Neerschulte	Germany	7:06.9	
8	Yeri Park	South Korea	7:20.3	
9	Jessica Borg Ghigo	Malta	7:25.1	
