= Orienteering at the 2017 World Games – Men's middle distance =

Orienteering - Men's Middle Distance at the 2017 World Games
- Venue: Trzebnica Aquapark, Wrocław, Poland
- Date: 26 July 2017
- Competitors: 40 from 21 nations

Medalists
gold medal	(Switzerland) Matthias Kyburz
silver medal	(Switzerland) Florian Howald
bronze medal	(Czech Republic) Vojtěch Král

The men's middle distance competition in orienteering at the 2017 World Games took place on 26 July 2017 at the Trzebnica Aquapark in Wrocław, Poland.

== Competition format ==
A total of 40 athletes entered the competition. Every athlete has to check 30 control points, which are located across the course.

== Results ==
Rank	Name	Nationality	Time
1st place, gold medalist(s)	Matthias Kyburz	Switzerland	34:05
2nd place, silver medalist(s)	Florian Howald	Switzerland	34:43
3rd place, bronze medalist(s)	Vojtěch Král	Czech Republic	35:20
4	Gernot Kerschbaumer	Austria	35:50
5	Frédéric Tranchand	France	35:56
6	Oleksandr Kratov	Ukraine	36:07
6	Gustav Bergman	Sweden	36:07
8	Ruslan Glebov	Ukraine	36:10
9	Soren Bobach	Denmark	36:30
10	Dmitry Tsvetkov	Russia	36:52
11	Jerker Lysell	Sweden	37:00
12	Lucas Basset	France	37:05
13	Andreas Boesen	Denmark	37:26
14	Ralph Street	(United Kingdom) Great Britain	37:27
15	Andrey Khramov	Russia	37:43
16	Fabian Hertner	Switzerland	37:54
17	Jan Petržela	Czech Republic	37:58
18	Bartosz Pawlak	Poland	38:11
19	Jon Aukrust Osmoen	Norway	38:16
20	Håkon Jarvis Westergård	Norway	38:30
21	Martin Regborn	Sweden	39:07
22	Yannick Michiels	Belgium	39:40
23	Peter Hodkinson	(United Kingdom) Great Britain	39:41
24	Elias Kuukka	Finland	39:44
25	Piotr Parfianowicz	Poland	39:47
26	Jesse Laukkarinen	Finland	39:56
27	Robert Merl	Austria	40:01
28	Kenny Kivikas	Estonia	40:10
29	Andreu Blanes	Spain	40:20
30	Tim Robertson	New Zealand	42:07
31	Mate Baumholczer	Hungary	42:58
32	Ross Morrison	New Zealand	43:19
33	Damian Konotopetz	Canada	43:57
34	Aron Bako	Hungary	44:00
35	Sidnaldo Farias Sousa	Brazil	45:02
36	William Critchley	Canada	50:48
37	Yuta Tanikawa	Japan	51:19
38	Carlos Sousa De Araujo	Brazil	54:02
39	Liu Cheng-Hsun	Chinese Taipei	1:19:19
	Kristo Heinmann	Estonia	DSQ
