= Finswimming at the 2017 World Games – Men's 50 m bi-fins =

Finswimming - Men's Bi-fins 50 m at the 2017 World Games
- Venue: Orbita Indoor Swimming Pool, Wrocław, Poland
- Dates: 22 July 2017
- Competitors: 8 from 7 nations

Medalists
gold medal	(Russia) Andrey Arbuzov
silver medal	(Czech Republic) Jakub Jarolim
bronze medal	(Belarus) Dmitry Gavrilov

The men's bi-fins 50 m event in finswimming at the 2017 World Games took place on 22 July 2017 at the Orbita Indoor Swimming Pool in Wrocław, Poland.

== Competition format ==
A total of 8 athletes entered the competition. Only final was held.

== Results ==
=== Final ===
Rank	Athlete	Nation	Time
1st place, gold medalist(s)	Andrey Arbuzov	Russia	18.55
2nd place, silver medalist(s)	Jakub Jarolim	Czech Republic	19.08
3rd place, bronze medalist(s)	Dmitry Gavrilov	Belarus	19.18
4	Gergő Kosina	Hungary	19.28
5	Clement Becq	France	19.57
6	Naoya Hirano	Japan	19.94
6	Viktor Kondratev	Russia	19.94
8	Evangelos Marinos	Greece	20.02
