= Muaythai at the 2017 World Games – Men's 67 kg =

World Games muaythai event

Men's 67 kg at the 2017 World Games
- Muaythai pictogram
- Venue: Orbita Hall
- Dates: 28–30 July 2017
- Competitors: 8 from 8 nations

Medalists
1st place, gold medalist(s)		Serhii Kuliaba	Ukraine
2nd place, silver medalist(s)		Vladimir Kuzmin	Russia
3rd place, bronze medalist(s)		Anueng Khatthamarasri	Thailand

The men's 67 kg muaythai (Note: Muaythai is the official name of Muay Thai, recognized by International World Games Association and International Olympic Committee.) event at the 2017 World Games was held from 28 to 30 July 2017 at the Orbita Hall. 8 Muay Thai practitioners from 8 nations are expected to compete.

== Competition schedule ==
All times are in local time (UTC+2), according to the official schedule.

Legend
QF	Quarterfinals	SF	Semifinals	F	Finals

M = Morning session, A = Afternoon session, E = Evening session

Date →	Jul 28			Jul 29			Jul 30		
Event ↓	M	A	E	M	A	E	M	A	E
Men's 67 kg			QF		SF		F		

== Results ==
=== Legend ===
- KO-B — Won by Win by Knock-out - Hit to Body in Round 3
- RSC-B — Won by Referee Stopping Contest - Hit to Body in Round 2
- RSC-In — Won by Referee Stopping Contest - Injury in Round 3
- RSC-OC — Won by Referee Stopping Contest - Out Class in Round 2
- WO — Won by walkover

=== Gold medal match ===
Gold medal match
(Ukraine) Serhii Kuliaba	29
(Russia) Vladimir Kuzmin	28

=== Main bracket ===
Quarterfinals
Akram Al-Qaysi (IRQ)
Serhii Kuliaba (UKR)	RSC-OC
Pavel Hryshanovich (BLR)
Anueng Khatthamarasri (THA)	RSC-B
Jarred Rothwell (RSA)
Kazbek Sagyndykov (KAZ)	KO-B
Vladimir Kuzmin (RUS)	30
Mateusz Janik (POL)	27

Semifinals
Serhii Kuliaba (UKR)	29
Anueng Khatthamarasri (THA)	28
Kazbek Sagyndykov (KAZ)
Vladimir Kuzmin (RUS)	RSC-In

Gold medal match
Serhii Kuliaba (UKR)	29
Vladimir Kuzmin (RUS)	28

=== Bronze medal match ===
Bronze medal match
Anueng Khatthamarasri (THA)	WO
Kazbek Sagyndykov (KAZ)
