= Orienteering at the 2017 World Games – Men's sprint =

Orienteering - Men's Sprint at the 2017 World Games
- Venue: City Center, Wrocław, Poland
- Dates: 25 July 2017
- Competitors: 40 from 21 nations

Medalists
gold medal	(Sweden) Jerker Lysell
silver medal	(Belgium) Yannick Michiels
bronze medal	(Switzerland) Matthias Kyburz

The men's sprint competition in orienteering at the 2017 World Games took place on 25 July 2017 in the City Center of Wrocław, Poland.

== Competition format ==
A total of 40 athletes entered the competition. Every athlete has to check 21 control points, which are located across the course.

== Results ==
Rank	Name	Nationality	Time
1st place, gold medalist(s)	Jerker Lysell	Sweden	14:40.50
2nd place, silver medalist(s)	Yannick Michiels	Belgium	14:42.80
3rd place, bronze medalist(s)	Matthias Kyburz	Switzerland	14:57.20
4	Ruslan Glebov	Ukraine	14:58.50
5	Martin Regborn	Sweden	15:10.20
6	Soren Bobach	Denmark	15:11.30
7	Ralph Street	(United Kingdom) Great Britain	15:11.80
8	Frédéric Tranchand	France	15:11.90
9	Vojtěch Král	Czech Republic	15:19.20
10	Florian Howald	Switzerland	15:22.50
11	Andreu Blanes	Spain	15:29.90
12	Peter Hodkinson	(United Kingdom) Great Britain	15:31.30
13	Andreas Boesen	Denmark	15:33.70
14	Robert Merl	Austria	15:36.10
15	Tim Robertson	New Zealand	15:37.60
16	Fabian Hertner	Switzerland	15:37.80
17	Lucas Basset	France	15:39.00
18	Gustav Bergman	Sweden	15:41.00
19	Håkon Jarvis Westergård	Norway	15:41.50
20	Andrey Khramov	Russia	15:43.00
21	Bartosz Pawlak	Poland	15:43.40
22	Piotr Parfianowicz	Poland	15:46.10
23	Gernot Kerschbaumer	Austria	15:48.20
24	Jesse Laukkarinen	Finland	15:50.30
25	Jan Petržela	Czech Republic	15:53.50
26	Kenny Kivikas	Estonia	15:58.00
27	Elias Kuukka	Finland	16:15.80
28	Damian Konotopetz	Canada	16:21.20
29	Dmitry Tsvetkov	Russia	16:22.80
30	Aron Bako	Hungary	16:26.70
31	Mate Baumholczer	Hungary	16:33.90
32	Kristo Heinmann	Estonia	16:37.10
33	Jon Aukrust Osmoen	Norway	16:38.00
34	Ross Morrison	New Zealand	16:44.20
35	Oleksandr Kratov	Ukraine	16:54.90
36	Sidnaldo Farias Sousa	Brazil	17:13.50
37	William Critchley	Canada	17:25.20
38	Carlos Sousa De Araujo	Brazil	18:27.50
39	Yuta Tanikawa	Japan	18:40.00
40	Liu Cheng-Hsun	Chinese Taipei	20:24.70
