= Muaythai at the 2017 World Games – Men's 63.5 kg =

World Games muaythai event

Men's 63.5 kg at the 2017 World Games
- Muaythai pictogram
- Venue: Orbita Hall
- Dates: 28–30 July 2017
- Competitors: 8 from 8 nations

Medalists
1st place, gold medalist(s)		Igor Liubchenko	Ukraine
2nd place, silver medalist(s)		Ali Zarinfar	Iran
3rd place, bronze medalist(s)		Oskar Siegert	Poland

The men's 63.5 kg muaythai (Note: Muaythai is the official name of Muay Thai, recognized by International World Games Association and International Olympic Committee.) event at the 2017 World Games was held from 28 to 30 July 2017 at the Orbita Hall. 8 Muay Thai practitioners from 8 nations are expected to compete.

== Competition schedule ==
All times are in local time (UTC+2), according to the official schedule.

Legend
QF	Quarterfinals	SF	Semifinals	F	Finals

M = Morning session, A = Afternoon session, E = Evening session

Date →	Jul 28			Jul 29			Jul 30		
Event ↓	M	A	E	M	A	E	M	A	E
Men's 63.5 kg		QF			SF			F	

== Results ==
=== Legend ===
- RSC-OC — Won by Referee Stopping Contest - Out Class in Round 2

=== Gold medal match ===
Gold medal match
Igor Liubchenko (UKR)	30
(Iran) Ali Zarinfar	27

=== Main bracket ===
Quarterfinals
Abil Galiyev (KAZ)
Igor Liubchenko (UKR)	RSC-OC
Jan Holec (CZE)	27
Ahmad Ondash (LBN)	30
Maksim Zhuk (BLR)	28
Oskar Siegert (POL)	29
Vo Van Dai (VIE)	27
Ali Zarinfar (IRI)	30

Semifinals
Igor Liubchenko (UKR)	RSC-OC
Ahmad Ondash (LBN)
Oskar Siegert (POL)	27
Ali Zarinfar (IRI)	30

Gold medal match
Igor Liubchenko (UKR)	30
(Iran) Ali Zarinfar	27

=== Bronze medal match ===
Bronze medal match
Ahmad Ondash (LBN)
Oskar Siegert (POL)	RSC-OC
