= Muaythai at the 2017 World Games – Women's 51 kg =

Women's 51 kg at the 2017 World Games
- Muaythai pictogram
- Venue: Orbita Hall
- Dates: 28–30 July 2017
- Competitors: 8 from 8 nations

Medalists
1st place, gold medalist(s)		Bùi Yến Ly	Vietnam
2nd place, silver medalist(s)		Apasara Koson	Thailand
3rd place, bronze medalist(s)		Janet Todd	United States

The women's 51 kg muaythai (Note: Muaythai is the official name of Muay Thai, recognized by International World Games Association and International Olympic Committee.) event at the 2017 World Games was held from 28 to 30 July 2017 at the Orbita Hall. 8 Muay Thai practitioners from 8 nations are expected to compete.

== Competition schedule ==
All times are in local time (UTC+2), according to the official schedule.

Legend
QF	Quarterfinals	SF	Semifinals	F	Finals

M = Morning session, A = Afternoon session, E = Evening session

Date →	Jul 28			Jul 29			Jul 30		
Event ↓	M	A	E	M	A	E	M	A	E
Women's 51 kg		QF			SF			F	

== Results ==
=== Legend ===
- RSC-OC — Won by Referee Stopping Contest - Out Class in Round 3

=== Gold medal match ===
Gold medal match
Bùi Yến Ly (VIE)	30
Apasara Koson (THA)	27

=== Main bracket ===
Quarterfinals
Gabriela Kuzawińska (POL)	29
Liudmila Chyslova (BLR)	28
Bùi Yến Ly (VIE)	30
Atenea Flores (ESP)	27
Myriame Djedidi (FRA)	28
Apasara Koson (THA)	29
Janet Todd (USA)	29
Meriem El Moubarik (MAR)	28

Semifinals
Gabriela Kuzawińska (POL)	27
Bùi Yến Ly (VIE)	30
Apasara Koson (THA)	30
Janet Todd (USA)	27

Gold medal match
Bùi Yến Ly (VIE)	30
Apasara Koson (THA)	27

=== Bronze medal match ===
Bronze medal match
Gabriela Kuzawińska (POL)
Janet Todd (USA)	RSC-OC
