= Indoor rowing at the 2017 World Games =

Indoor Rowing at the 2017 World Games
- Venue: Multifunctional Hall
- Dates: 26–27 July 2017
- Competitors: 58 from 28 nations

The indoor rowing event at the World Games 2017 was held at the Multifunctional Hall in Jelcz-Laskowice, Poland. For the first time, indoor rowing was included in the World Games as an invitational sport.

== Schedule ==
July	20	21	22	23	24	25	26	27	28	29	30	Gold medals
Indoor rowing							4	2				6

== Qualifying criteria ==
There was a maximum number of participants of 20 for the 2000m races, and 15 for the 500m races.

Each national rowing federation could qualify a maximum of one man and one woman for the 500m event, and one of the 2000m events.

In addition, the 2000m events had universality quotas. For the regions of Africa, Asia, Europe and Latin America & Caribbean, a minimum of 2 athletes from each was required. For Australia & New Zealand, Oceania (excl. AUS & NZ) and USA and Canada, there was a minimum of 1.

== Qualification ==
For each event, the highest ranked athletes on the Concept2 rankings were taken, and then athletes above the maximum per federation were removed, as were those not meeting the universality quotas, until there was enough athletes qualified.

== Participating nations ==
- Austria (4)
- Belarus (1)
- Canada (1)
- Croatia (1)
- Czech Republic (3)
- Spain (2)
- Finland (1)
- France (1)
- Great Britain (5)
- Germany (4)
- Greece (1)
- Hungary (3)
- Italy (2)
- Japan (1)
- South Korea (4)
- Latvia (2)
- Malta (4)
- Peru (1)
- Poland (3)
- Romania (1)
- South Africa (2)
- Switzerland (1)
- Slovakia (1)
- Sweden (1)
- Thailand (2)
- Uganda (2)
- Ukraine (2)
- United States (2)

== Medalists ==
6 medal events were contested at the World Games, 3 for men and 3 for women.

=== Men ===
Event	Gold	Silver	Bronze
Open 500 m	Anton Bondarenko; Ukraine	Phil Clapp; Great Britain	Pavel Shurmei; Belarus
Open 2000 m	Oliver Zeidler; Germany	Anton Bondarenko; Ukraine	Bendegúz Pétervári-Molnár; Hungary
Lightweight 2000 m	Artur Mikolajczewski; Poland	Florian Berg; Austria	Jaruwat Saensuk; Thailand

=== Women ===
Event	Gold	Silver	Bronze
Open 500 m	Olena Buryak; Ukraine	Anna Wierzbowska; Poland	Cecilia Velin; Sweden
Open 2000 m	Olena Buryak; Ukraine	Cecilia Velin; Sweden	Magdalena Lobnig; Austria
Lightweight 2000 m	Anna Berger; Austria	Justine Reston; Great Britain	Phuttharaksa Neegree; Thailand

== Medal table ==
Rank	Nation	Gold	Silver	Bronze	Total
1	Ukraine	3	1	0	4
2	Austria	1	1	1	3
3	Poland	1	1	0	2
4	Germany	1	0	0	1
5	Great Britain	0	2	0	2
6	Sweden	0	1	1	2
7	Thailand	0	0	2	2
8	Belarus	0	0	1	1
8	Hungary	0	0	1	1
Totals (9 entries)		6	6	6	18
