= Muaythai at the 2017 World Games – Men's 71 kg =

World Games muaythai event

Men's 71 kg at the 2017 World Games
- Muaythai pictogram
- Venue: Orbita Hall
- Dates: 28–30 July 2017
- Competitors: 8 from 8 nations

Medalists
| 1st place, gold medalist(s) | | Suppachai Muensang | Thailand |
| 2nd place, silver medalist(s) | | Masoud Minaei | Iran |
| 3rd place, bronze medalist(s) | | Gabriele David Mazzetti | Peru |

The men's 71 kg muaythai (Note: Muaythai is the official name of Muay Thai, recognized by International World Games Association and International Olympic Committee.) event at the 2017 World Games was held from 28 to 30 July 2017 at the Orbita Hall. 8 Muay Thai practitioners from 8 nations are expected to compete.

== Competition schedule ==
All times are in local time (UTC+2), according to the official schedule.

Legend
| QF | Quarterfinals | SF | Semifinals | F | Finals |

M = Morning session, A = Afternoon session, E = Evening session

| Date → | Jul 28 | | | Jul 29 | | | Jul 30 | | |
| Event ↓ | M | A | E | M | A | E | M | A | E |
|---|---|---|---|---|---|---|---|---|---|
| Men's 71 kg | | | QF | | SF | | F | | |

== Results ==
=== Legend ===
- RSC-H — Won by Referee Stopping Contest - Hit to Head in Round 2
- RSC-OC — Won by Referee Stopping Contest - Out Class in Round 2
- WO — Won by walkover

=== Gold medal match ===
| Gold medal match |
| Masoud Minaei (IRI) | 28 |
| Suppachai Muensang (THA) | 29 |

=== Main bracket ===
Quarterfinals
Jakub Rajewski (POL)
Masoud Minaei (IRI) | RSC-H
Mohamed Anime (MAR)
Pavel Dzialendzik (BLR) | WO
Michalis Manoli (CYP) | 27
Gabrielle David Mazzetti (PER) | 30
Dimitar Markov (BUL)
Suppachai Muensang (THA) | RSC-OC

Semifinals
Masoud Minaei (IRI) | 30
Pavel Dzialendzik (BLR) | 27
Gabrielle David Mazzetti (PER) | 27
Suppachai Muensang (THA) | 30

Gold medal match
Masoud Minaei (IRI) | 28
Suppachai Muensang (THA) | 29

=== Bronze medal match ===
| Bronze medal match |
| Pavel Dzialendzik (BLR) | 28 |
| Gabrielle David Mazzetti (PER) | 29 |
