= Finswimming at the 2017 World Games – Men's 100 m surface =

Finswimming - Men's Surface 100 m at the 2017 World Games
- Venue: Orbita Indoor Swimming Pool, Wrocław, Poland
- Dates: 21 July 2017
- Competitors: 8 from 6 nations

Medalists
gold medal	(Russia) Dmitrii Zhurman
silver medal	(Germany) Max Poschart
bronze medal	(Russia) Pavel Kabanov

The men's surface 100 m event in finswimming at the 2017 World Games took place on 21 July 2017 at the Orbita Indoor Swimming Pool in Wrocław, Poland.

== Competition format ==
A total of 8 athletes entered the competition. Only final was held.

== Results ==
=== Final ===
Rank	Athlete	Nation	Time	Note
1st place, gold medalist(s)	Dmitrii Zhurman	Russia	34.70	GR
2nd place, silver medalist(s)	Max Poschart	Germany	34.84	
3rd place, bronze medalist(s)	Pavel Kabanov	Russia	39.92	
4	Malte Striegler	Germany	35.08	
5	Loukas Karetzopoulos	Greece	35.47	
6	Alexandre Noir	France	35.52	
7	Nguyen Thanh Loc	Vietnam	35.70	
8	Cesare Fumarola	Italy	35.95	
