= Muaythai at the 2017 World Games – Men's 57 kg =

World Games muaythai event

Men's 57 kg at the 2017 World Games
- Muaythai pictogram
- Venue: Orbita Hall
- Dates: 28–30 July 2017
- Competitors: 8 from 8 nations

Medalists
| 1st place, gold medalist(s) | | Wiwat Khamtha | Thailand |
| 2nd place, silver medalist(s) | | Aleksandr Abramov | Russia |
| 3rd place, bronze medalist(s) | | Almaz Sarsembekov | Kazakhstan |

The men's 57 kg muaythai (Note: Muaythai is the official name of Muay Thai, recognized by International World Games Association and International Olympic Committee.) event at the 2017 World Games was held from 28 to 30 July 2017 at the Orbita Hall. 8 Muay Thai practitioners from 8 nations participated in the event.

== Competition schedule ==
All times are in local time (UTC+2), according to the official schedule.

Legend
| QF | Quarterfinals | SF | Semifinals | F | Finals |

M = Morning session, A = Afternoon session, E = Evening session

| Date → | Jul 28 | | | Jul 29 | | | Jul 30 | | |
| Event ↓ | M | A | E | M | A | E | M | A | E |
|---|---|---|---|---|---|---|---|---|---|
| Men's 57 kg | | QF | | | SF | | F | | |

== Results ==
=== Legend ===
- RSC-B — Won by Referee Stopping Contest - Hit to Body in Round 2
- WO — Won by walkover

=== Gold medal match ===
| Gold medal match |
| Wiwat Khamtha (THA) | 30 |
| Aleksandr Abramov (RUS) | 27 |

=== Main bracket ===
Quarterfinals
Almaz Sarsembekov (KAZ) | 30
Phillip Delarmino (PHI) | 27
Mateusz Kucharski (POL) | 27
Wiwat Khamtha (THA) | 30
Konstiantyn Trishyn (UKR) | WO
Ain Bin Kamarrudin (MAS)
Aleksandr Abramov (RUS) | 30
Mohamed El Barnoussi (MAR) | 27

Semifinals
Almaz Sarsembekov (KAZ) | 27
Wiwat Khamtha (THA) | 30
Konstiantyn Trishyn (UKR) | 27
Aleksandr Abramov (RUS) | 30

Gold medal match
Wiwat Khamtha (THA) | 30
Aleksandr Abramov (RUS) | 27

=== Bronze medal match ===
| Bronze medal match |
| Almaz Sarsembekov (KAZ) | RSC-B |
| Konstiantyn Trishyn (UKR) |
