= Muaythai at the 2017 World Games – Men's 54 kg =

World Games muaythai event

Men's 54 kg at the 2017 World Games
- Muaythai pictogram
- Venue: Orbita Hall
- Dates: 28–30 July 2017
- Competitors: 8 from 8 nations

Medalists
1st place, gold medalist(s)		Elaman Sayasatov	Kazakhstan
2nd place, silver medalist(s)		Kevin Martinez	Spain
3rd place, bronze medalist(s)		Aslanbek Zikreev	Russia

The men's 54 kg muaythai (Note: Muaythai is the official name of Muay Thai, recognized by International World Games Association and International Olympic Committee.) event at the 2017 World Games was held from 28 to 30 July 2017 at the Orbita Hall. 8 Muay Thai practitioners from 8 nations are expected to compete.

== Competition schedule ==
All times are in local time (UTC+2), according to the official schedule.

Legend
QF	Quarterfinals	SF	Semifinals	F	Finals

M = Morning session, A = Afternoon session, E = Evening session

Date →	Jul 28			Jul 29			Jul 30		
Event ↓	M	A	E	M	A	E	M	A	E
Men's 54 kg		QF			SF		F		

== Results ==
=== Legend ===
- RSC-OC — Won by Referee Stopping Contest - Out Class in Round 2
- WO — Won by walkover

=== Gold medal match ===
Gold medal match
Kevin Martinez (ESP)	27
Elaman Sayasatov (KAZ)	30

=== Main bracket ===
Quarterfinals
Mohd Ali Bin Jaakub (MAS)
Yoon Deok-jae (KOR)	WO
Pranom Sung-Ngoen (THA)	28
Kevin Martinez (ESP)	29
Chen Yu-xi (TPE)
Aslanbek Zikreev (RUS)	RSC-OC
Elaman Sayasatov (KAZ)	30
Przemysław Kmiecik (POL)	27

Semifinals
Yoon Deok-jae (KOR)	28
Kevin Martinez (ESP)	29
Aslanbek Zikreev (RUS)	27
Elaman Sayasatov (KAZ)	30

Gold medal match
Kevin Martinez (ESP)	27
Elaman Sayasatov (KAZ)	30

=== Bronze medal match ===
Bronze medal match
Yoon Deok-jae (KOR)	27
Aslanbek Zikreev (RUS)	30
