= Finswimming at the 2017 World Games – Women's 50 m apnoea =

Finswimming - Women's Apnoea 50 m at the 2017 World Games
- Venue: Orbita Indoor Swimming Pool, Wrocław, Poland
- Dates: 21 July 2017
- Competitors: 8 from 6 nations

Medalists
gold medal	(South Korea) Jang Ye-sol
silver medal	(South Korea) Kim Ga-in
bronze medal	(Ukraine) Kateryna Dyelova

The women's apnoea 50 m event in finswimming at the 2017 World Games took place on 21 July 2017 at the Orbita Indoor Swimming Pool in Wrocław, Poland.

== Competition format ==
A total of 8 athletes entered the competition. Only final was held.

== Results ==
=== Final ===
Rank	Athlete	Nation	Time
1st place, gold medalist(s)	Jang Ye-sol	South Korea	16.02
2nd place, silver medalist(s)	Kim Ga-in	South Korea	16.40
3rd place, bronze medalist(s)	Kateryna Dyelova	Ukraine	16.46
4	Liu Simin	China	16.57
5	Sofia Ktena	Greece	16.63
6	Elizaveta Andrienko	Russia	16.64
7	Shu Chengjing	China	17.07
8	Kotone Mori	Japan	17.60
