= Muaythai at the 2017 World Games – Men's 75 kg =

World Games muaythai event

Men's 75 kg at the 2017 World Games
- Muaythai pictogram
- Venue: Orbita Hall
- Dates: 28–30 July 2017
- Competitors: 8 from 8 nations

Medalists
| 1st place, gold medalist(s) | | Vital Hurkou | Belarus |
| 2nd place, silver medalist(s) | | Vasyl Sorokin | Ukraine |
| 3rd place, bronze medalist(s) | | Ivan Grigorev | Russia |

The men's 75 kg muaythai (Note: Muaythai is the official name of Muay Thai, recognized by International World Games Association and International Olympic Committee.) event at the 2017 World Games was held from 28 to 30 July 2017 at the Orbita Hall. 8 Muay Thai practitioners from 8 nations are expected to compete.

== Competition schedule ==
All times are in local time (UTC+2), according to the official schedule.

Legend
| QF | Quarterfinals | SF | Semifinals | F | Finals |

M = Morning session, A = Afternoon session, E = Evening session

| Date → | Jul 28 | | | Jul 29 | | | Jul 30 | | |
| Event ↓ | M | A | E | M | A | E | M | A | E |
|---|---|---|---|---|---|---|---|---|---|
| Men's 75 kg | | | QF | | SF | | F | | |

== Results ==
=== Legend ===
- RSC-OC — Won by Referee Stopping Contest - Out Class in Round 3
- WO — Won by walkover

=== Gold medal match ===
| Gold medal match |
| Vital Hurkou (BLR) | 29 |
| Vasyl Sorokin (UKR) | 28 |

=== Main bracket ===
Quarterfinals
Johane Beausejour (FRA) | 28
Troy Jones (USA) | 29
Vital Hurkou (BLR) | 29
Diogo Calado (POR) | 28
Vasyl Sorokin (UKR) | 30
Zhang Yongkang (CHN) | 27
Ivan Grigorev (RUS) | 29
Dawid Mirkowski (POL) | 28

Semifinals
Troy Jones (USA)
Vital Hurkou (BLR) | RSC-OC
Vasyl Sorokin (UKR) | 29
Ivan Grigorev (RUS) | 28

Gold medal match
Vital Hurkou (BLR) | 29
Vasyl Sorokin (UKR) | 28

=== Bronze medal match ===
| Bronze medal match |
| Troy Jones (USA) |
| Ivan Grigorev (RUS) | WO |
