= Boules sports at the 2017 World Games =

Boules sport at the 2017 World Games
- Venue: Centennial Hall
- Dates: 22–24 July 2017
- Competitors: 94 from 27 nations

The boules sports tournament at the 2017 World Games in Wrocław was played between 22 and 24 July. 94 competitors, from 27 nations, participated in the tournament. The boules sports competition took place at Centennial Hall in Lower Silesian Voivodeship.

== Participating nations ==
94 competitors, from 27 nations, participated in the tournament.

- Algeria (1)
- Argentina (3)
- Australia (1)
- Austria (2)
- Belgium (4)
- Bosnia and Herzegovina (1)
- Brazil (4)
- Chile (5)
- China (8)
- Croatia (2)
- Denmark (2)
- France (8)
- Germany (2)
- Italy (10)
- Madagascar (4)
- Monaco (2)
- Morocco (1)
- Poland (8)
- Russia (1)
- San Marino (2)
- Slovakia (2)
- Slovenia (3)
- Spain (4)
- Switzerland (4)
- Thailand (4)
- Turkey (4)
- United States (2)

== Medal table ==
Rank	Nation	Gold	Silver	Bronze	Total
1	France	4	1	2	7
2	Italy	2	0	2	4
3	Argentina	2	0	0	2
4	Thailand	1	3	0	4
5	China	1	1	3	5
6	Slovenia	0	1	1	2
7	Belgium	0	1	0	1
7	Brazil	0	1	0	1
7	Croatia	0	1	0	1
7	San Marino	0	1	0	1
11	Austria	0	0	1	1
11	Spain	0	0	1	1
Totals (12 entries)		10	10	10	30

== Medalists ==
=== Men ===
Event	Gold	Silver	Bronze
Petanque Doubles	Italy (ITA); Fabio Dutto; Diego Rizzi	Thailand (THA); Thanakorn Sangkaew; Sarawut Sriboonpeng	Spain (ESP); Enrique Catalan; Manuel Romero
Raffa Doubles	Italy (ITA); Giuliano Di Nicola; Gianluca Formicone	San Marino (SMR); Enrico Dall'Olmo; Jacopo Frisoni	Austria (AUT); Günther Baur; Philipp Wolfgang
Lyonnaise Precision	Nicolas Pretto; Argentina	Pero Ćubela; Croatia	Gregory Chirat; France
Petanque Precision Shooting	Henri Lacroix; France	Thanakorn Sangkaew; Thailand	Diego Rizzi; Italy
Lyonnaise Progressive	Guillaume Abelfo; France	Anže Petrič; Slovenia	Li Panpan; China

=== Women ===
Event	Gold	Silver	Bronze
Petanque Doubles	Thailand (THA); Nantawan Fueangsanit; Phantipha Wongchuvej	Belgium (BEL); Nancy Barzin; Camille Max	France (FRA); Caroline Bourriaud; Anne Maillard
Raffa Doubles	Argentina (ARG); Romina Bolatti; María Victoria Maíz	Brazil (BRA); Noeli Dalla Corte; Ana Caroline Martins	China (CHN); Cen Wefei; Zhang Wei
Lyonnaise Precision	Guo Xiaomin; China	Suzy Marie; France	Laura Skoberne; Slovenia
Petanque Precision Shooting	Caroline Bourriaud; France	Nantawan Fueangsanit; Thailand	Chao Guijin; China
Lyonnaise Progressive	Barbara Barthet; France	Wang Yang; China	Serena Traversa; Italy
