= Karate at the 2017 World Games – Men's kumite 75 kg =

Men's Kumite 75kg at the 2017 World Games
- Venue: GEM Sports Complex
- Date: 26 July 2017
- Competitors: 8 from 8 nations

Medalists
1st place, gold medalist(s)		(Ukraine) Stanislav Horuna
2nd place, silver medalist(s)		(Iran) Ali Asghar Asiabari
3rd place, bronze medalist(s)		(Brazil) Hernâni Veríssimo

The men's kumite 75 kg competition in karate at the 2017 World Games took place on 26 July 2017 at the GEM Sports Complex in Wrocław, Poland.

== Results ==
=== Elimination round ===
==== Group A ====
Rank	Athlete	B	W	D	L	Pts	Score
1	Stanislav Horuna (UKR)	3	3	0	0	6	16–1
2	Thomas Scott (USA)	3	2	0	1	4	8–7
3	Yermek Ainazarov (KAZ)	3	1	0	2	2	3–9
4	Maciej Boguszewski (POL)	3	0	0	3	0	2–12

	Score	
Maciej Boguszewski (POL)	1–3	Yermek Ainazarov (KAZ)
Stanislav Horuna (UKR)	6–1	Thomas Scott (USA)
Maciej Boguszewski (POL)	0–6	Stanislav Horuna (UKR)
Yermek Ainazarov (KAZ)	0–4	Thomas Scott (USA)
Maciej Boguszewski (POL)	1–3	Thomas Scott (USA)
Yermek Ainazarov (KAZ)	0–4	Stanislav Horuna (UKR)

==== Group B ====
Rank	Athlete	B	W	D	L	Pts	Score
1	Ali Asghar Asiabari (IRI)	3	3	0	0	6	12–0
2	Hernâni Veríssimo (BRA)	3	2	0	1	4	5–3
3	Omar Abdel Rahman (EGY)	3	1	0	2	2	2–4
4	Joji Veremalua (FIJ)	3	0	0	3	0	0–12

	Score	
Ali Asghar Asiabari (IRI)	7–0	Joji Veremalua (FIJ)
Hernâni Veríssimo (BRA)	2–0	Omar Abdel Rahman (EGY)
Ali Asghar Asiabari (IRI)	3–0	Hernâni Veríssimo (BRA)
Joji Veremalua (FIJ)	0–2	Omar Abdel Rahman (EGY)
Ali Asghar Asiabari (IRI)	2–0	Omar Abdel Rahman (EGY)
Joji Veremalua (FIJ)	0–3	Hernâni Veríssimo (BRA)

=== Finals ===
Semifinals
Stanislav Horuna (UKR)	4
Hernâni Veríssimo (BRA)	1
Ali Asghar Asiabari (IRI)	9
Thomas Scott (USA)	0

Final
Stanislav Horuna (UKR)	4
Ali Asghar Asiabari (IRI)	2
Third place
Hernâni Veríssimo (BRA)	2
Thomas Scott (USA)	0
