= Indoor rowing at the 2017 World Games – Women's Open 500 metres =

Indoor event in the 2017 World Games

Women's Open 500 metres at the 2017 World Games
- Venue: Multifunctional Hall
- Location: Jelcz-Laskowice, Poland
- Dates: 27 July
- Competitors: 11 from 11 nations

Medalists
gold medal	Olena Buryak	Ukraine
silver medal	Anna Wierzbowska	Poland
bronze medal	Cecilia Velin	Sweden

The women's open 500 metres event in indoor rowing at the 2017 World Games took place on the 27 July 2017 at the Multifunctional Hall in Jelcz-Laskowice.

== Results ==
WR = Games Record

Rank	Athlete	NOC	Time	Notes
1st place, gold medalist(s)	Olena Buryak	Ukraine	1:24.5	WR
2nd place, silver medalist(s)	Anna Wierzbowska	Poland	1:26.8	
3rd place, bronze medalist(s)	Cecilia Velin	Sweden	1:27.0	
4	Laura Kerr	Great Britain	1:32.7	
5	Morgan McGrath	United States	1:34.5	
6	Beatrix Fekete	Hungary	1:34.9	
7	Yvonne Apitz	Germany	1:35.9	
8	Jessica Borg Ghigo	Malta	1:36.9	
9	Diane Delalleau	France	1:37.1	
10	Barbara Taylor	Spain	1:45.4	
11	Kristina Bjorknas	Finland	1:49.6	
