= Sumo at the 2017 World Games – Women's lightweight =

Sumo - Women's Lightweight at the 2017 World Games
- Venue: Orbita Hall, Wrocław, Poland
- Dates: 22 July 2017
- Competitors: 15 from 11 nations

Medalists
gold medal	(Ukraine) Svitlana Trosiuk
silver medal	(Brazil) Luciana Montgomery Higuchi
bronze medal	(Poland) Magdalena Macios

The women's lightweight competition in sumo at the 2017 World Games took place on 22 July 2017 at the Orbita Hall in Wrocław, Poland.

== Competition format ==
A total of 15 athletes entered the competition. They fought in the cup system with repechages.

== Results ==
=== Main draw ===
	Score	
1/16 Finals
(Brazil) Luciana Montgomery Higuchi (BRA)		Bye
(United States) Jana van Witbeck (USA)	Oshidashi	(Poland) Aleksandra Rozum (POL)
(Hungary) Fruzsina Forgó (HUN)	Yorikiri	(Germany) Julia Dorny (GER)
(Mongolia) Undrakhzaya Nyamsuren (MGL)	Uwatenage	(Poland) Magdalena Macios (POL)
(Russia) Vera Koval (RUS)	Yoritaoshi	(Ukraine) Svitlana Trosiuk (UKR)
(United States) Jenelle Hamilton (USA)	Sukuinage	(Norway) Rikke Juell Bugge (NOR)
(Venezuela) Euscaris Pereira (VEN)	Yoritaoshi	(Chinese Taipei) Hsiao Hui-shan (TPE)
(Poland) Monika Skiba (POL)	Shitatenage	(Japan) Yuka Okutomi (JPN)
Quarterfinals
(Brazil) Luciana Montgomery Higuchi (BRA)	Uwatenage	(Poland) Aleksandra Rozum (POL)
(Hungary) Fruzsina Forgó (HUN)	Yoritaoshi	(Poland) Magdalena Macios (POL)
(Ukraine) Svitlana Trosiuk (UKR)	Yoritaoshi	(Norway) Rikke Juell Bugge (NOR)
(Venezuela) Euscaris Pereira (VEN)		(Japan) Yuka Okutomi (JPN)

=== Repechages ===
	Score	
1/16 Repechages
(Poland) Aleksandra Rozum (POL)		Bye
(Hungary) Fruzsina Forgó (HUN)	Shitatenage	(Mongolia) Undrakhzaya Nyamsuren (MGL)
(Norway) Rikke Juell Bugge (NOR)	Shitatenage	(Russia) Vera Koval (RUS)
(Venezuela) Euscaris Pereira (VEN)	Uwatenage	(Poland) Monika Skiba (POL)
Repechages Quarterfinals
(Poland) Aleksandra Rozum (POL)	Shitatenage	(Mongolia) Undrakhzaya Nyamsuren (MGL)
(Russia) Vera Koval (RUS)	Shitatenage	(Poland) Monika Skiba (POL)

=== Semifinals ===
	Score	
Semifinals
(Brazil) Luciana Montgomery Higuchi (BRA)	Sukuinage	(Poland) Magdalena Macios (POL)
(Ukraine) Svitlana Trosiuk (UKR)	Ashitori	(Japan) Yuka Okutomi (JPN)
Repechages Semifinals
(Japan) Yuka Okutomi (JPN)	Shitatenage	(Mongolia) Undrakhzaya Nyamsuren (MGL)
(Poland) Magdalena Macios (POL)	Uwatenage	(Poland) Monika Skiba (POL)

=== Finals ===
	Score	
Gold medal match
(Brazil) Luciana Montgomery Higuchi (BRA)	Ashitori	(Ukraine) Svitlana Trosiuk (UKR)
Bronze medal match
(Japan) Yuka Okutomi (JPN)	Katasukashi	(Poland) Magdalena Macios (POL)
