= Finswimming at the 2017 World Games – Men's 200 m surface =

Finswimming - Men's Surface 200 m at the 2017 World Games
- Venue: Orbita Indoor Swimming Pool, Wrocław, Poland
- Dates: 22 July 2017
- Competitors: 8 from 5 nations

Medalists
gold medal	(Russia) Dmitrii Zhurman
silver medal	(Germany) Max Poschart
bronze medal	(Russia) Dmitrii Kokorev

The men's surface 200 m event in finswimming at the 2017 World Games took place on 22 July 2017 at the Orbita Indoor Swimming Pool in Wrocław, Poland.

== Competition format ==
A total of 8 athletes entered the competition. Only final was held.

== Results ==
=== Final ===
Rank	Athlete	Nation	Time	Note
1st place, gold medalist(s)	Dmitrii Zhurman	Russia	1:20.25	GR
2nd place, silver medalist(s)	Max Poschart	Germany	1:20.87	
3rd place, bronze medalist(s)	Dmitrii Kokorev	Russia	1:20.89	
4	Juan Fernando Ocampo Lozada	Colombia	1:21.26	
5	Max Lauschus	Germany	1:21.28	
6	Stefano Figini	Italy	1:21.51	
7	Aliaksandr Biazmen	Belarus	1:22.07	
8	Kevin Zanardi	Italy	1:23.24	
