= Water skiing at the 2017 World Games – Women's jump =

Water skiing - Women's Jump at the 2017 World Games
- Venue: Old Odra River, Wrocław, Poland
- Dates: 26–27 July 2017
- Competitors: 9 from 9 nations

Medalists
gold medal	(Belarus) Natallia Berdnikava
silver medal	(Greece) Marie Vympranietsova
bronze medal	(Finland) Jutta Menestrina

The women's jump competition in water skiing at the 2017 World Games took place from 26 to 27 July 2017 at the Old Odra River in Wrocław, Poland.

== Competition format ==
A total of 9 athletes entered the competition. From qualifications the best 6 skiers qualify to final.

== Results ==
=== Qualifications ===
Rank	Athlete	Nation	Result	Note
1	Natallia Berdnikava	Belarus	46.6	Q
2	Jutta Menestrina	Finland	46.5	Q
3	Marie Vympranietsova	Greece	46.0	Q
4	Nancy Chardin	France	44.4	Q
5	Brittany Greenwood	United States	42.7	Q
6	Giannina Bonnemann	Germany	42.1	Q
7	Lisa Francke	Sweden	41.4	
8	Saaya Hirosawa	Japan	40.8	
9	Marialuisa Pajni	Italy	38.4	

=== Final ===
Rank	Athlete	Nation	Result
1st place, gold medalist(s)	Natallia Berdnikava	Belarus	48.8
2nd place, silver medalist(s)	Marie Vympranietsova	Greece	48.2
3rd place, bronze medalist(s)	Jutta Menestrina	Finland	47.7
4	Nancy Chardin	France	45.5
5	Giannina Bonnemann	Germany	42.7
6	Brittany Greenwood	United States	40.0
