= Ju-jitsu at the 2017 World Games – Men's fighting 62 kg =

Men's fighting 62 kg at the 2017 World Games
- Venue: GEM Sports Complex
- Date: 28 July 2017
- Competitors: 6 from 6 nations

Medalists
| 1st place, gold medalist(s) | | (Ukraine) Bohdan Mochulskyi |
| 2nd place, silver medalist(s) | | (Colombia) Jairo Alejandro Viviescas Ortíz |
| 3rd place, bronze medalist(s) | | (Germany) Roman Apolonov |

The men's fighting 62 kg competition in ju-jitsu at the 2017 World Games took place on 28 July 2017 at the GEM Sports Complex in Wrocław, Poland.

== Results ==
=== Elimination round ===
==== Group A ====
| Rank | Athlete | B | W | L | Pts | Score |
|---|---|---|---|---|---|---|
| 1 | Roman Apolonov (GER) | 2 | 2 | 0 | 23–9 | +14 |
| 2 | Jairo Alejandro Viviescas Ortíz (COL) | 2 | 1 | 1 | 55–13 | +42 |
| 3 | Ecco van der Veer (NED) | 2 | 0 | 2 | 4–60 | –54 |

| | Score | |
|---|---|---|
| Roman Apolonov (GER) | 13–5 | Jairo Alejandro Viviescas Ortíz (COL) |
| Roman Apolonov (GER) | 10–4 | Ecco van der Veer (NED) |
| Jairo Alejandro Viviescas Ortíz (COL) | 50–0 | Ecco van der Veer (NED) |

==== Group B ====
| Rank | Athlete | B | W | L | Pts | Score |
|---|---|---|---|---|---|---|
| 1 | Louis Cloots (BEL) | 2 | 1 | 1 | 60–11 | +49 |
| 2 | Bohdan Mochulskyi (UKR) | 2 | 1 | 1 | 18–27 | –9 |
| 3 | Radoslav Markov (BUL) | 2 | 1 | 1 | 17–57 | –40 |

| | Score | |
|---|---|---|
| Bohdan Mochulskyi (UKR) | 11–10 | Louis Cloots (BEL) |
| Bohdan Mochulskyi (UKR) | 7–17 | Radoslav Markov (BUL) |
| Louis Cloots (BEL) | 50–0 | Radoslav Markov (BUL) |

=== Finals ===
Semifinals
Roman Apolonov (GER) | 6
Bohdan Mochulskyi (UKR) | 14
Louis Cloots (BEL) | 7
Jairo Alejandro Viviescas Ortíz (COL) | 9

Final
Bohdan Mochulskyi (UKR) | 9
Jairo Alejandro Viviescas Ortíz (COL) | 8
Third place
Roman Apolonov (GER) | 10
Louis Cloots (BEL) | 8
