= Powerlifting at the 2017 World Games – Men's middleweight =

Powerlifting - Men's Middleweight at the 2017 World Games
- Venue: National Forum of Music, Wrocław, Poland
- Dates: 25 July 2017
- Competitors: 10 from 8 nations

Medalists
gold medal	(Poland) Jarosław Olech
silver medal	(Ukraine) Volodymyr Rysiev
bronze medal	(Ukraine) Andriy Naniev

The men's middleweight competition in powerlifting at the 2017 World Games took place on 25 July 2017 at the National Forum of Music in Wrocław, Poland.

== Competition format ==
A total of 10 athletes entered the competition. Each athlete had 3 attempts in each of 3 events: squat, bench press and deadlift. Athlete, who came with the biggest score in Wilks points is the winner.

== Results ==
Rank	Athlete	Nation	Weight	Squat	Bench press	Deadlift	Total weight	Total points
1st place, gold medalist(s)	Jarosław Olech	Poland	71.5	355.0	212.5	315.0	882.5	650.57
2nd place, silver medalist(s)	Volodymyr Rysiev	Ukraine	82.6	360.0	252.5	332.5	945.0	632.58
3rd place, bronze medalist(s)	Andriy Naniev	Ukraine	82.8	347.5	268.5	315.0	931.0	622.19
4	Andrey Prokopenko	Kazakhstan	74.4	327.5	237.5	302.5	867.5	621.82
5	Adam Ramzy	Canada	81.3	352.5	255.0	310.0	917.5	620.23
6	Paul Douglas	United States	82.8	357.5	222.5	310.0	890.0	595.05
7	Kim-Raino Rølvåg	Norway	82.0	330.0	252.5	290.0	872.5	586.84
8	Nobuyuki Hamada	Japan	73.4	290.0	227.5	275.0	792.5	573.45
9	Norihiro Otani	Japan	72.4	290.0	232.5	250.0	772.5	564.23
10	Rabah El Fekair	Algeria	75.4	320.0	145.0	285.0	750.0	532.27
