= Iceland at the 2017 World Games =

Iceland at the World Games 2017
- IOC code: ISL
- NOC: National Olympic and Sports Association of Iceland

in Wrocław, Poland 20 July 2017 – 30 July 2017
- Competitors: 1 in 1 sport
- Medals: Gold 0 Silver 0 Bronze 0 Total 0

World Games appearances
- 1981; 1985; 1989; 1993; 1997; 2001; 2005; 2009; 2013; 2017; 2022; 2025

Iceland competed at the 2017 World Games in Wrocław, Poland, from 20 July 2017 to 30 July 2017.

== Competitors ==
Sport	Men	Women	Total
Powerlifting	1	0	1
Total	1	0	1

== Powerlifting ==
1 athlete from Iceland qualified to compete at the 2017 World Games.

Athlete	Event	Squat	Bench press	Deadlift	Total weight	Total points	Rank
Júlían J. K. Jóhannsson	Men's super heavyweight	—	295.0	350.0	—	—	DSQ
