= Iceland at the 2022 World Games =

Iceland at the World Games 2022
- IOC code: ISL
- NOC: National Olympic and Sports Association of Iceland

in Birmingham, United States July 7 – 17, 2022
- Competitors: 4 (2 men and 2 women) in 2 sports
- Medals: Gold 0 Silver 0 Bronze 0 Total 0

World Games appearances
- 1981; 1985; 1989; 1993; 1997; 2001; 2005; 2009; 2013; 2017; 2022; 2025

Iceland is set to compete at the 2022 World Games in Birmingham, United States, from July 7 to 17, 2022.

== Competitors ==
The following is the list of number of competitors participating in the Games:

Sport	Men	Women	Total	Events
Dancesport	1	1	2	1
Powerlifting	1	1	2	2
Total	2	2	4	3

== Dancesport ==
Iceland competed in dancesport.

Latin

Athlete	Event	First round							Semifinal							Final						
Athlete	Event	CC	J	PD	R	S	Total	Rank	CC	J	PD	R	S	Total	Rank	CC	J	PD	R	S	Total	Rank
Nikita Bazev; Hanna Run Bazev	Latin	32.33	31.67	32.17	32.97	31.58	160.72	18	did not advance													

== Powerlifting ==
Iceland competed in powerlifting.

Athlete	Event	Squat	Bench press	Deadlift	Total weight	Total points	Rank
Júlían J. K. Jóhannsson	Men's super heavyweight	395.0	312.5	375.0	1082.5	95.31	9
Soley Margret Jonsdottir	Women's super heavyweight	DNS					
