= Powerlifting at the 2017 World Games – Men's heavyweight =

Powerlifting - Men's Heavyweight at the 2017 World Games
- Venue: National Forum of Music, Wrocław, Poland
- Dates: 25 July 2017
- Competitors: 11 from 8 nations

Medalists
| gold medal | (Ukraine) Sergii Bilyi |
| silver medal | (Russia) Dmitry Inzarkin |
| bronze medal | (Ukraine) Dmytro Semenenko |

The men's heavyweight competition in powerlifting at the 2017 World Games took place on 25 July 2017 at the National Forum of Music in Wrocław, Poland.

== Competition format ==
A total of 11 athletes entered the competition. Each athlete had 3 attempts in each of 3 events: squat, bench press and deadlift. The athlete with the biggest score in Wilks points is the winner.

== Results ==
| Rank | Athlete | Nation | Weight | Squat | Bench press | Deadlift | Total weight | Total points |
|---|---|---|---|---|---|---|---|---|
| 1st place, gold medalist(s) | Sergii Bilyi | Ukraine | 98.1 | 407.5 | 297.5 | 375.0 | 1080.0 WR | 662.47 |
| 2nd place, silver medalist(s) | Dmitry Inzarkin | Russia | 91.3 | 360.0 | 282.5 | 350.0 | 992.5 | 629.15 |
| 3rd place, bronze medalist(s) | Dmytro Semenenko | Ukraine | 104.1 | 432.0 | 280.0 | 330.0 | 1042.0 | 624.57 |
| 4 | Sofiane Belkesir | France | 104.7 | 390.0 | 272.5 | 355.0 | 1017.5 | 608.67 |
| 5 | Ian Bell | United States | 92.7 | 357.5 | 230.0 | 371.0 | 958.5 | 603.18 |
| 6 | Sascha Stendebach | Germany | 92.8 | 337.5 | 275.0 | 342.5 | 955.0 | 600.60 |
| 7 | Stian Walgermo | Norway | 105.0 | 382.5 | 282.5 | 322.5 | 987.5 | 590.13 |
| 8 | David Coimbra | Brazil | 92.0 | 340.0 | 247.5 | 345.0 | 932.5 | 588.97 |
| 9 | Charles Conner | United States | 103.2 | 382.5 | 312.5 | 280.0 | 975.0 | 586.37 |
| 10 | Jan Wegiera | Poland | 92.9 | 350.0 | 300.0 | 280.0 | 930.0 | 584.41 |
| | Kristoffer Eikeland | Norway | 105.0 | 355.0 | NM | 340.0 | DSQ | DSQ |
