= Air sports at the 2017 World Games – Paramotor slalom =

Paramotor slalom at the World Games
- Venue: Szymanów Airport, Szymanów, Poland
- Dates: 21–23 July 2017
- Competitors: 17 from 5 nations

Medalists
1st place, gold medalist(s)		Wojciech Bógdał	Poland
2nd place, silver medalist(s)		Kittiphob Phrommat	Thailand
3rd place, bronze medalist(s)		Marcin Bernat	Poland

The paramotor slalom tournaments at the 2017 World Games in Wrocław was played between 21 and 23 July. 17 Paramotor slalom competitors, from 5 nations, participated in the tournament. The air sports competition took place at Szymanów Airport in Szymanów.

== Competition format ==
Final: The 17 paramotor slalom competitors perform nine rounds; the top three pilots win the gold, silver and bronze medals accordingly.

== Schedule ==
- All times are Central European Summer Time (UTC+2)

Date	Time	Round
Friday, 21 July	10:00	Final round 01
Friday, 21 July	10:20	Final round 02
Friday, 21 July	18:00	Final round 02
Friday, 21 July	18:30	Final round 02
Saturday, 22 July	11:00	Final round 03
Saturday, 22 July	11:20	Final round 06
Saturday, 22 July	16:00	Final round 07
Sunday, 23 July	07:45	Final round 08
Sunday, 23 July	08:30	Final round 09

== Results ==
Rank	Athlete	Nation	R1	R2	R3	R4	R5	R6	R7	R8	R9	Total
1st place, gold medalist(s)	Wojciech Bógdał	Poland	4	3	3	5	1	1	7	1	5	30
2nd place, silver medalist(s)	Kittiphob Phrommat	Thailand	2	2	8	4	4	11	2	3	2	38
3rd place, bronze medalist(s)	Marcin Bernat	Poland	3	1	2	2	8	9	8	2	6	41
4	Alexandre Mateos	France	1	4	1	1	13	1	13	8	3	45
5	Vicente Palmero	Spain	9	8	6	3	6	1	1	4	9	47
6	Milan Klement	Czech Republic	8	6	9	11	5	1	4	9	10	63
7	Víctor Rodríguez Santamarta	Spain	7	9	7	8	10	3	12	4	4	65
8	Chayaphong Pothipuk	Thailand	5	7	10	9	7	11	10	7	7	73
9	Nicolas Aubert	France	12	10	4	6	13	11	13	6	1	76
10	Jérémy Penone	France	6	5	5	7	13	11	13	10	8	78
11	Pongkorn Thanasakunkornsaeng	Thailand	11	16	13	10	12	1	3	11	12	89
12	Janejira Chui-Noei	Thailand	15	14	16	16	2	1	6	14	13	97
13	Jiří Koudela	Czech Republic	10	11	11	13	11	11	11	13	11	102
14	Ramón Morillas	Spain	13	15	12	12	9	11	9	12	15	108
15	Petr Matoušek	Czech Republic	16	12	15	15	3	11	5	16	16	109
16	Marie Mateos	France	14	13	14	14	13	11	13	15	14	121
17	Paweł Kozarzewski	Poland	17	16	17	17	13	11	13	17	17	138

== Medalists ==
Event	Gold	Silver	Bronze
Paramotor slalom	Poland; Wojciech Bógdał	Thailand; Kittiphob Phrommat	Poland; Marcin Bernat
