= Kickboxing at the 2017 World Games – Men's middleweight =

Kickboxing - Men's middleweight at the 2017 World Games
- Venue: Orbita Hall, Wrocław, Poland
- Dates: 26–27 July 2017
- Competitors: 8 from 8 nations

Medalists
gold medal	(France) Zakaria Laaouatni
silver medal	(Poland) Michał Ronkiewicz
bronze medal	(Russia) Datsi Datsiev

The men's middleweight competition in kickboxing at the 2017 World Games took place from 26 to 27 July 2017 at the Orbita Hall in Wrocław, Poland.

== Competition format ==
A total of 8 athletes entered the competition. They fought in the cup system.

== Results ==
Quarterfinals
(Brazil) Wallace Lopes	2
(Morocco) Mohamed Lazrak	1
(France) Zakaria Laaouatni	3
(Moldova) Alexandru Bejenaru	0
(Serbia) Ljubo Jalovi	0
(Poland) Michał Ronkiewicz	3
(Russia) Datsi Datsiev	KO
(Iran) Seyed Amir Khoshkalam

Semifinals
(Brazil) Wallace Lopes	0
(France) Zakaria Laaouatni	3
(Poland) Michał Ronkiewicz	2
(Russia) Datsi Datsiev	1

Final
(France) Zakaria Laaouatni	3
(Poland) Michał Ronkiewicz	0

Third place
(Brazil) Wallace Lopes
(Russia) Datsi Datsiev	WO
