= Powerlifting at the 2017 World Games – Men's super heavyweight =

Powerlifting - Men's Super heavyweight at the 2017 World Games
- Venue: National Forum of Music, Wrocław, Poland
- Dates: 26 July 2017
- Competitors: 10 from 8 nations

Medalists
gold medal	(Ukraine) Oleksii Rokochiy
silver medal	(United States) Joseph Cappellino
bronze medal	(Kazakhstan) Nurlan Yeshmakhanov

The men's super heavyweight competition in powerlifting at the 2017 World Games took place on 26 July 2017 at the National Forum of Music in Wrocław, Poland.

== Competition format ==
A total of 10 athletes entered the competition. Each athlete had 3 attempts in each of 3 events: squat, bench press and deadlift. The athlete with the biggest score in Wilks points is the winner.

== Results ==
Rank	Athlete	Nation	Weight	Squat	Bench press	Deadlift	Total weight	Total points
1st place, gold medalist(s)	Oleksii Rokochiy	Ukraine	122.3	432.5	317.5	355.0	1105.0	632.50
2nd place, silver medalist(s)	Joseph Cappellino	United States	166.3	440.0	350.0	335.0	1125.0	613.13
3rd place, bronze medalist(s)	Nurlan Yeshmakhanov	Kazakhstan	117.6	390.0	290.0	365.0	1045.0	603.70
4	David Lupac	Czech Republic	145.3	415.0	330.0	340.0	1085.0	603.04
5	Krzysztof Wierzbicki	Poland	105.1	300.0	200.0	420.0	920.0	549.61
6	Ryan Stinn	Canada	144.2	385.0	285.0	295.0	965.0	536.93
	Julian J.K. Johansson	Iceland	166.2	NM	295.0	350.0	DSQ	DSQ
	Blaine Sumner	United States	175.2	475.0	405.0	NM	DSQ	DSQ
	Oleksii Bychkov	Ukraine	119.8	NM	-	-	DSQ	DSQ
	Kevin Jaeger	Germany	129.8	NM	-	-	DSQ	DSQ
