= Muaythai at the 2017 World Games – Men's 91 kg =

World Games muaythai event

Men's 91 kg at the 2017 World Games
- Muaythai pictogram
- Venue: Orbita Hall
- Dates: 28–30 July 2017
- Competitors: 7 from 7 nations

Medalists
1st place, gold medalist(s)		Oleh Pryimachov	Ukraine
2nd place, silver medalist(s)		Łukasz Radosz	Poland
3rd place, bronze medalist(s)		Jakub Klauda	Czech Republic

The men's 91 kg muaythai (Note: Muaythai is the official name of Muay Thai, recognized by International World Games Association and International Olympic Committee.) event at the 2017 World Games was held from 28 to 30 July 2017 at the Orbita Hall. 7 Muay Thai practitioners from 7 nations are expected to compete.

== Competition schedule ==
All times are in local time (UTC+2), according to the official schedule.

Legend
QF	Quarterfinals	SF	Semifinals	F	Finals

M = Morning session, A = Afternoon session, E = Evening session

Date →	Jul 28			Jul 29			Jul 30		
Event ↓	M	A	E	M	A	E	M	A	E
Men's 91 kg			QF		SF		F		

== Results ==
=== Legend ===
- RSC-OC — Won by Referee Stopping Contest - Out Class in Round 1
- WO — Won by walkover

=== Gold medal match ===
Gold medal match
Łukasz Radosz (POL)
Oleh Pryimachov (UKR)	WO

=== Main bracket ===
Quarterfinals
Łukasz Radosz (POL)	BYE
Jakub Klauda (CZE)	30
Serdar Eroglu (TUR)	27
Jakob Styben (GER)	RSC-OC
Silapa Halangahu (NZL)
Oleh Pryimachov (UKR)	RSC-1
Rok Erste (SLO)

Semifinals
Łukasz Radosz (POL)	29
Jakub Klauda (CZE)	28
Jakob Styben (GER)	27
Oleh Pryimachov (UKR)	30

Gold medal match
Łukasz Radosz (POL)
Oleh Pryimachov (UKR)	WO

=== Bronze medal match ===
Bronze medal match
Jakub Klauda (CZE)	29
Jakob Styben (GER)	28
