= Powerlifting at the 2017 World Games – Women's middleweight =

Powerlifting - Women's Middleweight at the 2017 World Games
- Venue: National Forum of Music, Wrocław, Poland
- Dates: 24 July 2017
- Competitors: 10 from 7 nations

Medalists
gold medal	(Ukraine) Larysa Soloviova
silver medal	(Russia) Anna Ryzhkova
bronze medal	(Chinese Taipei) Wu Hui-Chun

The women's middleweight competition in powerlifting at the 2017 World Games took place on 24 July 2017 at the National Forum of Music in Wrocław, Poland.

== Competition format ==
A total of 10 athletes entered the competition. Each athlete had 3 attempts in each of 3 events: squat, bench press and deadlift. The athlete with the biggest score in Wilks points is the winner.

== Results ==
Rank	Athlete	Nation	Weight	Squat	Bench press	Deadlift	Total weight	Total points
1st place, gold medalist(s)	Larysa Soloviova	Ukraine	62.9	225.0	170.0	210.0	605.0	650.19
2nd place, silver medalist(s)	Anna Ryzhkova	Russia	56.9	220.0	140.0	192.5	552.5	641.84
3rd place, bronze medalist(s)	Wu Hui-Chun	Chinese Taipei	58.9	205.0	145.0	202.5	552.5	624.55
4	Vilma Ochoa Vargas	Ecuador	53.4	212.5	105.0	187.5	505.0	616.91
5	Olga Adamovich	Russia	61.6	227.5	132.5	200.0	560.0	611.80
6	Cicera Tavares	Brazil	61.8	220.0	122.5	210.0	552.5	602.11
7	Erica Bueno	Brazil	58.7	192.5	155.0	182.5	530.0	600.97
8	Kenia Monserrate	Ecuador	57.2	207.5	107.5	195.0	510.0	590.27
9	Gundula Von Bachhaus	Germany	61.8	180.0	170.0	187.5	537.5	585.61
	Edgimar Ruiz Moreno	Venezuela	52.2	NM	-	-	DSQ	DSQ
