= Ju-jitsu at the 2017 World Games – Men's fighting 85 kg =

Men's fighting 85 kg at the 2017 World Games
- Venue: GEM Sports Complex
- Date: 29 July 2017
- Competitors: 6 from 6 nations

Medalists
1st place, gold medalist(s)		(Denmark) Mikkel Brix Willard
2nd place, silver medalist(s)		(Russia) Denis Belov
3rd place, bronze medalist(s)		(Sweden) William Seth-Wenzel

The men's fighting 85 kg competition in ju-jitsu at the 2017 World Games took place on 29 July 2017 at the GEM Sports Complex in Wrocław, Poland.

== Results ==
=== Elimination round ===
==== Group A ====
Rank	Athlete	B	W	L	Pts	Score
1	Denis Belov (RUS)	2	2	0	24–10	+14
2	William Seth-Wenzel (SWE)	2	1	1	21–20	+1
3	Nicolas Baez (SUI)	2	0	2	10–25	–15

	Score	
Denis Belov (RUS)	14–6	William Seth-Wenzel (SWE)
Denis Belov (RUS)	10–4	Nicolas Baez (SUI)
William Seth-Wenzel (SWE)	15–6	Nicolas Baez (SUI)

==== Group B ====
Rank	Athlete	B	W	L	Pts	Score
1	Mikkel Brix Willard (DEN)	2	2	0	22–12	+10
2	Junior David Cabezas Quiñones (COL)	2	1	1	18–26	–8
3	Ivan Nastenko (UKR)	2	0	2	16–18	–2

	Score	
Mikkel Brix Willard (DEN)	7–5	Ivan Nastenko (UKR)
Mikkel Brix Willard (DEN)	15–7	Junior David Cabezas Quiñones (COL)
Ivan Nastenko (UKR)	11–11	Junior David Cabezas Quiñones (COL)

=== Finals ===
Semifinals
Denis Belov (RUS)	50
Junior David Cabezas Quiñones (COL)	0
Mikkel Brix Willard (DEN)	50
William Seth-Wenzel (SWE)	0

Final
Denis Belov (RUS)	0
Mikkel Brix Willard (DEN)	50
Third place
Junior David Cabezas Quiñones (COL)	0
William Seth-Wenzel (SWE)	50
