= Kickboxing at the 2017 World Games – Men's light middleweight =

Kickboxing - Men's light middleweight at the 2017 World Games
- Venue: Orbita Hall, Wrocław, Poland
- Dates: 26–27 July 2017
- Competitors: 8 from 8 nations

Medalists
| gold medal | (Ukraine) Vitalii Dubina |
| silver medal | (Bulgaria) Bogdan Shumarov |
| bronze medal | (Israel) Itai Gershon |

The men's light middleweight competition in kickboxing at the 2017 World Games took place from 26 to 27 July 2017 at the Orbita Hall in Wrocław, Poland.

== Competition format ==
A total of 8 athletes entered the competition. They fought in the cup system.

== Results ==
Quarterfinals
(Ukraine) Vitalii Dubina | 3
(Jordan) Ali Ahmad Khalaf Hasan | 0
(Poland) Marcin Kret | 0
(Israel) Itai Gershon | 3
(Brazil) Bruno Gazani | 3
(Morocco) Saad Qabissi | 0
(Slovakia) Miroslav Smolar | 0
(Bulgaria) Bogdan Shumarov | 3

Semifinals
(Ukraine) Vitalii Dubina | 2
(Israel) Itai Gershon | 1
(Brazil) Bruno Gazani | 0
(Bulgaria) Bogdan Shumarov | 3

Final
(Ukraine) Vitalii Dubina | 3
(Bulgaria) Bogdan Shumarov | 0
Third place
(Israel) Itai Gershon | 3
(Brazil) Bruno Gazani | 0
