= San Marino at the 2017 World Games =

- IOC code: SMR

in Wrocław, Poland 20 July 2017 – 30 July 2017
- Medals Ranked 52nd: Gold 0 Silver 1 Bronze 0 Total 1

World Games appearances
- 1981; 1985; 1989; 1993; 1997; 2001; 2005; 2009; 2013; 2017; 2022; 2025

San Marino competed at the 2017 World Games held in Wrocław, Poland.

== Medalists ==
Medal	Name	Sport	Event
Silver	Enrico Dall'Olmo; Jacopo Frisoni	Boules sports	Men's Raffa Doubles

== Boules sports ==
Enrico Dall'Olmo and Jacopo Frisoni won the silver medal in the men's Raffa Doubles event.
