= Kickboxing at the 2017 World Games – Men's super heavyweight =

Kickboxing - Men's super heavyweight at the 2017 World Games
- Venue: Orbita Hall, Wrocław, Poland
- Dates: 26–27 July 2017
- Competitors: 8 from 8 nations

Medalists
gold medal	(Turkey) Hamdi Saygılı
silver medal	(Ukraine) Roman Holovatiuk
bronze medal	(Poland) Michał Turyński

The men's super heavyweight competition in kickboxing at the 2017 World Games took place from 26 to 27 July 2017 at the Orbita Hall in Wrocław, Poland.

Guto Inocente from Brazil had originally won gold medal in this event, but he was later disqualified because of doping.

== Competition format ==
A total of 8 athletes entered the competition. They fought in the cup system.

== Results ==
Quarterfinals
(Croatia) Ante Verunica
(Poland) Michał Turyński	KO
(Morocco) Mohamed Darkaoui
(Turkey) Hamdi Saygılı	WO
(Brazil) Guto Inocente	RSC
(Kazakhstan) Yersultan Bekenov
(Ukraine) Roman Holovatiuk	3
(Serbia) Sasa Polugić	0

Semifinals
(Poland) Michał Turyński
(Turkey) Hamdi Saygılı	WO
(Brazil) Guto Inocente	3
(Ukraine) Roman Holovatiuk	0

Final
(Turkey) Hamdi Saygılı	0
(Brazil) Guto Inocente	3
Third place
(Poland) Michał Turyński
(Ukraine) Roman Holovatiuk	WO
