= Kickboxing at the 2017 World Games – Men's welterweight =

Kickboxing - Men's welterweight at the 2017 World Games
- Venue: Orbita Hall, Wrocław, Poland
- Dates: 26–27 July 2017
- Competitors: 8 from 8 nations

Medalists
gold medal	(Serbia) Slobodan Mijailović
silver medal	(Canada) Jason Hinds
bronze medal	(Poland) Wojciech Kazieczko

The men's welterweight competition in kickboxing at the 2017 World Games took place from 26 to 27 July 2017 at the Orbita Hall in Wrocław, Poland.

== Competition format ==
A total of 8 athletes entered the competition. They fought in the cup system.

== Results ==
Quarterfinals
(Poland) Wojciech Kazieczko	3
(Turkey) Burak Eymur	0
(Serbia) Slobodan Mijailović	3
(Russia) Vladislav Ukrainets	0
(Italy) Danilo Andrulli	0
(Canada) Jason Hinds	3
(Iran) Hamid Amni	0
(Ukraine) Yurii Peretiatko	3

Semifinals
(Poland) Wojciech Kazieczko	1
(Serbia) Slobodan Mijailović	2
(Canada) Jason Hinds	2
(Ukraine) Yurii Peretiatko	1

Final
(Serbia) Slobodan Mijailović	2
(Canada) Jason Hinds	1

Third place
(Poland) Wojciech Kazieczko	WO
(Ukraine) Yurii Peretiatko
