= Kickboxing at the 2017 World Games – Men's light welterweight =

Kickboxing - Men's light welterweight at the 2017 World Games
- Venue: Orbita Hall, Wrocław, Poland
- Dates: 26–27 July 2017
- Competitors: 8 from 8 nations

Medalists
gold medal	(Ukraine) Orfan Sananzade
silver medal	(Serbia) Aleksandar Konovalov
bronze medal	(Croatia) Muhamet Deskaj

The men's light welterweight competition in kickboxing at the 2017 World Games took place from 26 to 27 July 2017 at the Orbita Hall in Wrocław, Poland.

== Competition format ==
A total of 8 athletes entered the competition. They fought in the cup system.

== Results ==
Quarterfinals
(Serbia) Aleksandar Konovalov	3
(Iran) Iraj Moradi	0
(Morocco) Mohamed Sailane	0
(Poland) Aleksander Kalicki	3
(Kyrgyzstan) Alexei Fedoseev	1
(Croatia) Muhamet Deskaj	2
(Mexico) David Aceves Martinez	1
(Ukraine) Orfan Sananzade	2

Semifinals
(Serbia) Aleksandar Konovalov	3
(Poland) Aleksander Kalicki	0
(Croatia) Muhamet Deskaj	1
(Ukraine) Orfan Sananzade	2

Final
(Serbia) Aleksandar Konovalov	1
(Ukraine) Orfan Sananzade	2

Third place
(Poland) Aleksander Kalicki
(Croatia) Muhamet Deskaj	WO
