= Nikolas Plytas =

Greek water sports athlete

Personal information
- Full name: Nikolas Plytas
- Nationality: Greek
- Born: 30 July 1995 (age 29); Athens, Greece
- Occupation: Professional Water Sports Athlete

Sport
- Country: Greece
- Sport: Water Skiing

Nikolas Plytas (born 30 July 1995) is a professional water sports athlete. He started his career as a water skier but is known for his participation in different water sports such as wakeboarding, surfing, wing foiling, foilboarding and snowboarding. His latest project was the “Water on the moon” video on Milos island, which he co-directed and starred in.

== Biography ==
Nikolas grew up in Athens, Greece, and started waterskiing in 2006.

In 2014, On the International Day of Peace, Nikolas created a peace sign in the circular lake Komiti in Vonitsa. "This day is very important. Especially in the times we live in, all I wish is for the world to live in peace, to respect fellow human beings and nature".

In 2017, Nikolas did a wakeboarding show at the Stavros Niarchos Foundation and the show gathered more than 10.000 people.

In June 2020, Plytas organised an event together with the energy drink brand Red Bull called “Nikolas Plytas Playground” where he charted 8 sailing boats and invited 10 athletes for a wakeboard competition. Nikolas didn't compete himself.

On 5 March 2021, Plytas co-directed and starred in the H20 Project where Nikolas went snowboarding from snow to water.

In 2021, Nikolas co-directed and starred in the “Water on the Moon”- a collaboration project between Prada and Red Bull. Together with the America's Cup Sailing Team Luna Rossa Prada Pirelli, Nikolas created a special made board because it had to traverse both water and solid ground during shooting.
