= Bùi Yến Ly =

Vietnamese Muay Thai fighter (born 1995)

Personal information
- Born: 27 February 1995 (age 31)

Sport
- Country: Bắc Giang province, Vietnam
- Sport: Muay Thai
Medal record
Women's Muay Thai
Representing Vietnam
World Championships
Gold medal – first place	2014 Langkawi	51 kg
Gold medal – first place	2019 Bangkok	51 kg
World Games
Gold medal – first place	2017 Wroclaw	51 kg
SEA Games
Gold medal – first place	2021 Hanoi	54 kg
Gold medal – first place	2019 Philippines	54 kg
Gold medal – first place	2013 Naypyidaw	51 kg
Asian Indoor and Martial Arts Games
Silver medal – second place	2013 Incheon	51 kg
Gold medal – first place	2017 Ashgabat	51 kg
Asian Beach Games
Gold medal – first place	2016 Da Nang	51 kg
Gold medal – first place	2014 Phuket	54 kg
Women's Kun Khmer
Representing Vietnam
SEA Games
Gold medal – first place	2023 Phnom Penh	57 kg

Bùi Yến Ly (born 27 February 1995) is a Vietnamese Muay Thai fighter. Born in Bắc Giang, she competed at the 2017 World Games for Vietnam and won the country's first gold medal in the 51 kg final. She also won the World Muaythai Championships' 51 kg category. She is a three-time gold medalist in Muay Thai at the SEA Games in 2013, 2019 and 2021.
