= Squash at the 2017 World Games =

- Venue: Hasta la Vista Sport Club; Wrocław, Poland
- Dates: July 2017
- No. of events: 2

The Squash competition at the World Games 2017 took place from July 25 to 28, in Wrocław in Poland, at the Hasta la Vista Sport Club.

== Schedule ==
All times are Poland Time (UTC+2)

P	Preliminaries	¼	Quarterfinals	½	Semifinals	B	Bronze medal match	F	Final

Date →	Sun 25			Mon 26			Tue 27		Wed 28	
Event ↓	M	A	E	M	A	E	A	E	A	E
Men's singles	P			¼			½		B	F
Women's singles	P			¼			½		B	F

M = Morning session, A = Afternoon session, E = Evening session

== Medals table ==
* Host nation (Poland)

Rank	Nation	Gold	Silver	Bronze	Total
1	France (FRA)	1	1	1	3
2	Germany (GER)	1	0	0	1
3	Hong Kong (HKG)	0	1	0	1
4	Malaysia (MAS)	0	0	1	1
Totals (4 entries)		2	2	2	6

== Medals summary ==
Event	Gold	Silver	Bronze
Men's singles	Simon Rösner (GER)	Grégoire Marche (FRA)	Mathieu Castagnet (FRA)
Women's singles	Camille Serme (FRA)	Joey Chan (HKG)	Nicol David (MAS)

== See also ==
- Squash at the World Games
