= Askat Zhantursynov =

Askat Zhantursynov (Russian: Жантурсы́нов Аска́т Бола́тович; Kazakh: Жантұрсынов Асқат Болатұлы; born 18 September 1994, in Aukhatty, Kazakhstan) is a Master of Sports of the Republic of Kazakhstan (International Class) in kickboxing, six-time champion of Kazakhstan, two-time champion of Asia and the owner of the World Cup 2016 in kickboxing. Since 2018 Askat is a professional boxer in the first heavyweight category. Since April 30, 2023 new All-Asia Cruiserweight UBO champion. Since August 4, 2024, champion according to WBS International.

== Biography ==
Askat Zhantursynov was born on September 18, 1994, in Aukhatty, Kordai district, Zhambyl region, Kazakhstan. Askat started kickboxing when he was 13 years old under the guidance of Talai Duishekeev at the "School of higher sportsmanship" in Taraz. Before switching to boxing, he successfully performed in tournaments in kickboxing. He trains in Almaty. His trainer is Sagatbek Musakhanov.

== Professional career ==
His professional debut took place on July 28, 2018, in Austin Sports Center in Austin (Texas, United States) against American Pete Rayna. Askat won the fight by technical knockout in the second round.

The second fight took place on September 29, 2018, in the universal sports palace "Wings of the Soviets" in Moscow against Latvian boxer Edgars Kalnars. The fight ended with Askat's victory by technical knockout in the first round.

Askat had his third professional fight against the American Michael Coronado on December 8, 2018, at the Austin Sports Center in Austin, Texas. The fight ended with Askat's victory by TKO in the third round.

On March 24, 2019, Zantursynov had his fourth fight in his professional career in the multifunctional complex Almaty Arena, where his rival was Georgian boxer Ramazi Gogichashvili. The six-round fight in the first heavyweight ended in Zhantursynov's victory by a split decision of the judges.

Askat's fifth fight was planned for October 9, 2020. Due to the fact that his opponent from Azerbajdzhan (Kazim Umudov) could not arrive in time, the fight did not take place in Almaty. Another opportunity was quickly found, so that Zhantursynov completed his fifth fight just days later on October 15, 2020, in Minsk, Belarus. His opponent was Ruslan Rodzivich. The fight ended already in the first round with a knock out by Zhantursynov, so that Askat could celebrate his fifth victory in series.

On December 18, 2021, Zantursynov had his six fight in his professional career in the capital of Kazakhstan, Nur-Sultan. His opponent was Surat Garayev from Azerbaijan. By unanimous decision of the judges Zantursynov lost this fight. Due to the injury received in the middle of the fight (according to commentators Zhantursynov fought with a broken nose – because his face was constantly flooded with blood), the fight was interrupted 3 times for medical examination of Askat.

Askat had his seventh professional fight against the Turk Serdar Sirin on April 30, 2023, at the Mustafa Oncel Sports Complex, Istanbul, Turkey. The fight ended with Askat's victory by TKO in the second round.

On January 31, 2024, in Baku (Azerbaijan), Askat Zhantursynov won his 8th professional fight. The fight with his opponent from Pakistan, Qamber Ali Hamdani, ended already on the 12th second of the first round by technical knockout.

The 9th professional fight took place on August 4, 2024, in Istanbul against the Turkish boxer Furkan Erturk. The fight ended with Askat's victory and a technical knockout of his opponent in the second round.

On March 29, 2025, at the World Siam Stadium in Bangkok, Thailand, Askat fought his 10th professional fight. His opponent, Weerapat Kamlangwai from Thailand, was defeated by knockout in the 4th round, securing another victory for Askat.

The 11th professional fight took place on September 27, 2025, again at the World Siam Stadium in Bangkok, Thailand. His opponent, Thoesdak Sinam / Singmanatsak Gym from Thailand, was defeated by technical knockout in the 3rd round, securing 10th victory for Askat.

On Januar 29, 2026, again at the World Siam Stadium in Bangkok, Thailand, Askat fought his 12th professional fight. His opponent from Thailand, Apisit Sangmuang, was defeated by technical knockout in the 2nd round.

The 13th professional fight took place on Oktober 31, 2026 in Zhekpe-Zhek Arena, Aktobe, Kazakhstan. His opponent, Abdullaziz Matazimov from Uzbekistan, was defeated by technical knockout in the 3rd round, after 3 knockdowns in round 2.

== Table of professional fights ==
Fight No.	Result	Date	Opponent	Place	Number of rounds	BoxRec
13	12 (11) - 1	Oktober 31, 2026	Abdullaziz Matazimov (15-18-0)	Aktobe, Kazakhstan	TK03	203
12	11 (10) - 1	January 29, 2026	Apisit Sangmuang (24-14-2)	Bangkok, Thailand	TKO2	204
11	10 (9) -1	September 27, 2025	Thoedsak Sinam / Singmanatsak Gym (24–20–0)	Bangkok, Thailand	TKO3	
10	9 (8) – 1	March 29, 2025	Weerapat Kamlangwai (7–4–0)	Bangkok, Thailand	TK04	199
9	8 (7) – 1	August 4, 2024	Furkan Erturk (0–2–0)	Istanbul, Turkey	TK02	
8	7 (6) – 1	January 31, 2024	Qamber Ali Hamdani (4–2–0)	Baku, Azerbaijan	TKO1	
7	6 (5) – 1	April 30, 2023	Serdar Sirin (2–0–1)	Istanbul, Turkey	TKO2	
6	5 (4) – 1	December 18, 2021	Surat Garayev (debut)	Nur-Sultan, Kazakhstan	UD	
5	5 (4) – 0	October 15, 2020	Ruslan Rodzivich (15–29–14)	Minsk, Belarus	TKO1	
4	4 (3) – 0	March 24, 2019	Ramazi Gogichashvili (10–27–2)	Almaty, Kazakhstan	SD6	468–1146
3	3 (3) – 0	December 8, 2018	Michael Coronado (1–1–1)	Austin, USA	TKO3	
2	2 (2) – 0	September 29, 2018	Edgars Kalnars (27–43–1)	Moscow, Russia	TKO1	
1	1 (1) – 0	July 28, 2018	Pete Rayna(0–0–0)	Austin, USA	TKO2	

== Awards ==
Order from the Department of Sport of Taraz «Облысқа сінiрген енбегi үшін белгісiмен марапатталады Oblyska sinirgen yenbegi ushin belgisimen marapattaldy» (For services to the region).

Askat's knockout against Serdar Sirin was awarded as knockout of the year by the UBO (universal boxing organization)
