= Cyprus at the 2017 World Games =

Cyprus at the World Games 2017
- IOC code: CYP
- NOC: Cyprus Olympic Committee

in Wrocław, Poland 20 July 2017 – 30 July 2017
- Competitors: 1 in 1 sport
- Medals: Gold 0 Silver 0 Bronze 0 Total 0

World Games appearances
- 1981; 1985; 1989; 1993; 1997; 2001; 2005; 2009; 2013; 2017; 2022; 2025

Cyprus competed at the World Games 2017 in Wrocław, Poland, from 20 July 2017 to 30 July 2017.

== Competitors ==
Sports	Men	Women	Total	Events
Muay Thai	1	0	1	1
Total	1	0	1	1

== Muaythai ==
Cyprus has qualified one athlete to the games.

Athlete	Event	Round of 16	Quarterfinals	Semifinals	Final / BM
Athlete	Event	Opposition Score	Opposition Score	Opposition Score	Opposition Score
Michalis Manoli	Men's 71 kg	(Peru) Gabriele David Mazzetti; L 27-30	Did not advance		
