= Júlían J. K. Jóhannsson =

Icelandic powerlifter (born 1993)

Júlían Jóhann Karl Jóhannsson
Personal information
- Born: 25 January 1993 (age 33)
- Weight: 162.4 kg (358 lb)

Sport
- Country: Iceland
- Sport: Powerlifting
- Club: Glímufélagið Ármann
Achievements and titles
World Games
9th	2022 Birmingham	Super heavyweight
World Open Powerlifting Championships
5th	2016 Orlando	120+kg
Bronze medal – third place	2017 Pilsen	120+kg
4th	2018 Halmstad	120+kg
Bronze medal – third place	2019 Dubai	120+kg

Júlían Jóhann Karl Jóhannsson (born 25 January 1993) is an Icelandic powerlifter who was named Icelandic Sportsperson of the Year in 2019. He holds the world record for deadlift in the men's 120+ kg weight class at 405.5 kg (894 lb), a record he set in 2019.

== Professional career ==
Júlían began competing in 2009 as part of the club Glímufélagið Ármann.

Júlían competed at the 2016 World Open Powerlifting Championships in the 120+ kg weight class, where he placed 5th. He competed again at the 2017 World Open Powerlifting Championships, where he placed 3rd overall. He was Iceland's only athlete for the 2017 World Games, competing in the men's super heavyweight powerlifting event, where he failed to finish his squat and was disqualified.

In 2018, Júlían set the world record for deadlift in the 120+ kg weight class at the 2018 World Open Powerlifting Championships, lifting 405.0 kg (892.9 lb) and placing 4th in the event. The previous record for that weight class was 397.5 kg (876 lb), set in 2011 by American powerlifter Brad Gillingham.

In 2019, Júlían set the deadlift world record for the 120+ kg weight class again, lifting 405.5 kg (894 lb) at the 2019 World Open Powerlifting Championships, the current record as of 2026. He would go on to place 3rd in the event, winning a bronze medal. Later that year, Júlían received the Icelandic Sportsperson of the Year award.

Júlían competed for Iceland in the 2022 World Games, at the men's super heavyweight powerlifting event, where he placed 9th overall.
