= Andreas Boesen =

Danish orienteer

Andreas Hougaard Boesen (born 1991) is an international Danish orienteer. He won his first medal at the 2017 World Orienteering Championships in Tartu, Estonia, running in the Mixed Sprint Relay with Maja Alm, Tue Lassen and Cecilie Friberg Klysner. Boesen runs for OK Roskilde and Angelniemen Ankkuri.
