= Vietnam at the 2017 World Games =

- IOC code: VIE

in Wrocław, Poland 20 July 2017 – 30 July 2017
- Medals: Gold 1 Silver 0 Bronze 0 Total 1

World Games appearances
- 1981; 1985; 1989; 1993; 1997; 2001; 2005; 2009; 2013; 2017; 2022; 2025

Vietnam competed at the 2017 World Games held in Wrocław, Poland.

== Medalists ==
Medal	Name	Sport	Event
Gold	Bùi Yến Ly	Muay Thai	Women's 51 kg

== Ju-jitsu ==
Vietnam competed in the women's duo event.

== Muay Thai ==
Bùi Yến Ly won the gold medal in the women's 51 kg event.
