= Squash at the 2017 World Games – Women's singles =

Squash women's singles at the 2017 World Games
- Venue: Hasta La Vista Squash Center; Wrocław, Poland
- Dates: 25–28 July 2017
- Competitors: 31 from 20 nations

Medalists
gold medal	(France) Camille Serme
silver medal	(Hong Kong) Joey Chan
bronze medal	(Malaysia) Nicol David

The women's singles squash competition at the 2017 World Games took place from 25 to 28 July 2017 at the Hasta La Vista Squash Center in Wrocław, Poland.

== Competition format ==
A total of 31 athletes entered the competition. Players competed in classic cup system.

== Seeds ==
1. (France) Camille Serme (Champion)
2. (Malaysia) Nicol David (Third place)
3. (Hong Kong) Joey Chan (Runner-up)
4. (United Kingdom) Millie Tomlinson (Quarterfinals)

== Results ==
Round of 32
1	(France) Camille Serme	3
(Poland) Natalia Ryfa	0
(Netherlands) Tessa ter Sluis	1
9/16	(United Kingdom) Alison Thomson	3
9/16	(Colombia) Catalina Peláez	3
(Latvia) Ineta Mackeviča	2
9/16	(Germany) Franziska Hennes	0
5/8	(Egypt) Nadine Shahin	3
5/8	(United Kingdom) Fiona Moverley	3
(Ukraine) Nadiia Usenko	0
(Czech Republic) Zuzana Kubáňová	0
9/16	(Japan) Misaki Kobayashi	3
9/16	(Malaysia) Rachel Arnold	3
(Czech Republic) Anna Serme	1
(Switzerland) Céline Walser	0
3/4	(United Kingdom) Millie Tomlinson	3
3/4	(Hong Kong) Joey Chan	3
(Ukraine) Alina Bushma	0
(Australia) Jessica Turnbull	0
(United Kingdom) Lisa Aitken	3
(Hungary) Csenge Kiss-Máté	0
5/8	(France) Coline Aumard	3
5/8	(Belgium) Nele Gilis	3
(Poland) Magda Kamińska	0
(Germany) Sina Kandra	1
9/16	(Australia) Tamika Saxby	3
9/16	(Mexico) Samantha Terán	3
(Spain) Cristina Gómez	1
(Russia) Irina Beliaeva	0
2	(Malaysia) Nicol David	3

Round of 16
1	(France) Camille Serme	3
9/16	(United Kingdom) Alison Thomson	0
9/16	(Colombia) Catalina Peláez	1
5/8	(Egypt) Nadine Shahin	3
5/8	(United Kingdom) Fiona Moverley	3
9/16	(Japan) Misaki Kobayashi	0
9/16	(Malaysia) Rachel Arnold	2
3/4	(United Kingdom) Millie Tomlinson	3
3/4	(Hong Kong) Joey Chan	3
9/16	(Netherlands) Milou van der Heijden	1
(United Kingdom) Lisa Aitken	1
5/8	(France) Coline Aumard	3
5/8	(Belgium) Nele Gilis	3
9/16	(Australia) Tamika Saxby	10
9/16	(Mexico) Samantha Terán	0
2	(Malaysia) Nicol David	3

Quarter finals
1	(France) Camille Serme	3
5/8	(Egypt) Nadine Shahin	0
5/8	(United Kingdom) Fiona Moverley	3
3/4	(United Kingdom) Millie Tomlinson	1
3/4	(Hong Kong) Joey Chan	3
5/8	(France) Coline Aumard	2
5/8	(Belgium) Nele Gilis	0
2	(Malaysia) Nicol David	3

Semi finals
1	(France) Camille Serme	3
5/8	(United Kingdom) Fiona Moverley	0
3/4	(Hong Kong) Joey Chan	3
2	(Malaysia) Nicol David	2

Finals
1	(France) Camille Serme	3
3/4	(Hong Kong) Joey Chan	0

3rd place
5/8	(United Kingdom) Fiona Moverley	0
2	(Malaysia) Nicol David	3
