= Olena Buryak =

Ukrainian rower

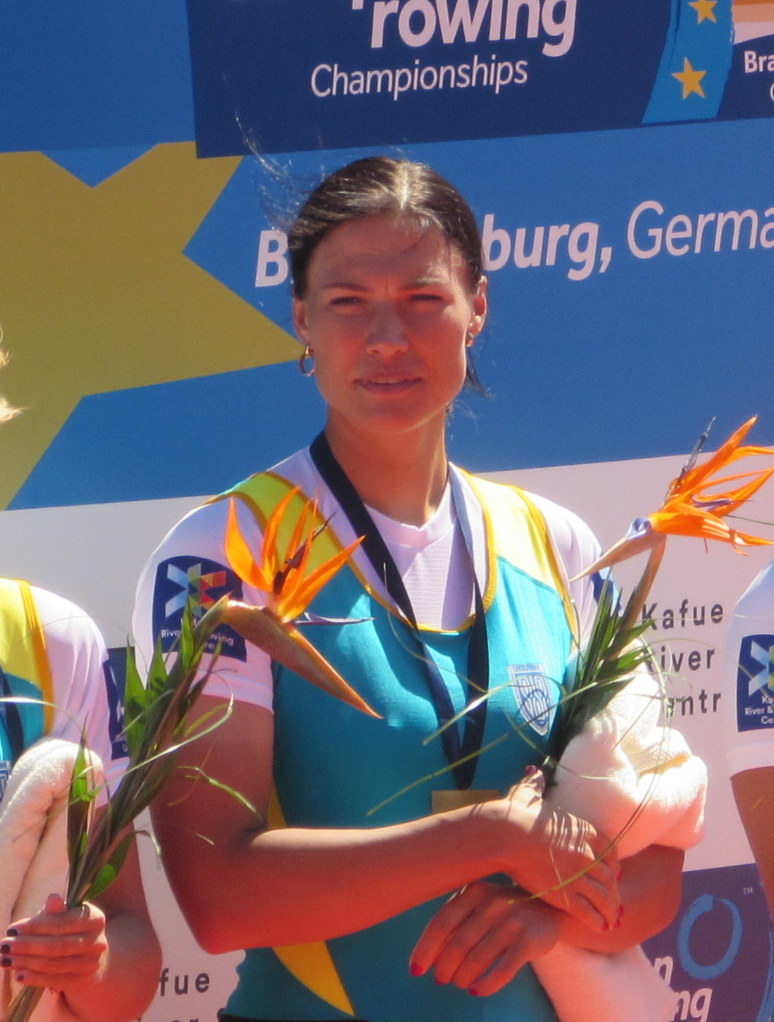
- Buryak in 2016

Personal information
- Born: 8 February 1988 (age 38) Mykolaiv, Ukrainian SSR, Soviet Union

Sport
- Sport: Rowing; Indoor rowing
- Club: Sub 7 Indoor Rowing Club
Medal record
Women's rowing
Representing Ukraine
World Rowing Championships
Silver medal – second place	2010 Karapiro	W4x
European Rowing Championships
Gold medal – first place	2010 Montemor-o-Vehlo	W4x
Silver medal – second place	2018 Glasgow	W4x
Bronze medal – third place	2009 Brest	W8+
Bronze medal – third place	2011 Plovdiv	W8+
Bronze medal – third place	2016 Brandenburg	W4x
Universiade
Bronze medal – third place	2013 Kazan	W2x
World Rowing U23 Championships
Gold medal – first place	2009 Racice	W4x
Women's indoor rowing
Representing Ukraine
World Games
Gold medal – first place	2017 Wroclaw	500m
Gold medal – first place	2017 Wroclaw	2.000m

Olena Buryak (Ukrainian: Олена Буряк; born 8 February 1988 in Mykolaiv) is a Ukrainian rower.

She competed at the 2012 Summer Olympics in the women's double sculls with Hanna Kravchenko. She was part of the Ukrainian women's quadruple sculls team, with Daryna Verkhohliad, Anastasiia Kozhenkova and Yevheniya Nimchenko, at the 2016 Summer Olympics. The team finished 4th. She was also part of the Ukrainian quadruple sculls team that finished second at the 2010 World Rowing Championships. The team consisted of Buryak, Kozhenkova, Kateryna Tarasenko and Yana Dementieva.

She rows for Spartak Kyiv.

== Indoor rowing career ==
Buryak is a multiple world record holder in women's indoor rowing, and was the fastest woman ever over the 2000 metres distance until Brooke Mooney surpassed her in 2021.

She won the CRASH-B Sprints in 2013 and 2017.
