= Bulgaria at the 2017 World Games =

Bulgaria at the World Games 2017
- IOC code: BUL
- NOC: Bulgarian Olympic Committee
- Website: www.olympics.com.au

in Wrocław, Poland 20 July 2017 – 30 July 2017
- Competitors: 1 in 1 sport

World Games appearances
- 1981; 1985; 1989; 1993; 1997; 2001; 2005; 2009; 2013; 2017; 2022; 2025

Bulgaria competed at the World Games 2017 in Wrocław, Poland, from 20 July 2017 to 30 July 2017.

== Competitors ==
| Sports | Men | Women | Total | Events |
|---|---|---|---|---|
| Muaythai | 1 | 0 | 1 | 1 |
| Rhythmic gymnastics | 0 | 2 | 2 | 3 |
| Trampoline | 0 | 2 | 2 | 1 |
| Ju-jitsu | 1 | 0 | 1 | 1 |
| Kickboxing | 2 | 0 | 2 | 1 |
| Total | 4 | 4 | 8 | 7 |

== Gymnastic ==
=== Rhythmic gymnastics ===
Bulgaria has qualified at the 2017 World Games:

- Women's individual event - 1 quota
