= Greece at the 2017 World Games =

Greece at the World Games 2017
- IOC code: GRE
- NOC: Hellenic Olympic Committee

in Wrocław, Poland 20 July 2017 – 30 July 2017
- Competitors: 12 in 7 sports
- Medals Ranked 52nd: Gold 0 Silver 1 Bronze 0 Total 1

World Games appearances (overview)
- 1981; 1985; 1989; 1993; 1997; 2001; 2005; 2009; 2013; 2017; 2022; 2025

Greece competed at the World Games 2017 in Wrocław, Poland, from 20 July 2017 to 30 July 2017.

== Medalists ==
Medal	Name	Sport	Event	Date
Silver	Marie Vympranietsova	Water skiing	Women's jump	July 27

== Competitors ==
Sports	Men	Women	Total	Events
Rhythmic Gymnastics	0	1	1	1
Total	0	1	1	1

== Gymnastic ==
=== Rhythmic Gymnastics ===
Greece has qualified at the 2017 World Games:

- Women's individual event - 1 quota

== Water skiing ==
Marie Vympranietsova won the silver medal in the women's jump event.
