= Thailand at the 2017 World Games =

Thailand at the World Games 2017
- IOC code: THA
- NOC: National Olympic Committee of Thailand
- Website: olympicthai.or.th

in Wrocław, Poland 20 July 2017 – 30 July 2017
- Competitors: 22 in 7 sports
- Medals Ranked 20th: Gold 3 Silver 5 Bronze 2 Total 10

World Games appearances (overview)
- 1981; 1985; 1989; 1993; 1997; 2001; 2005; 2009; 2013; 2017; 2022; 2025

Thailand competed at the World Games 2017 in Wrocław, Poland, from 20 July 2017 to 30 July 2017.

== Medalists ==
Medal	Name	Sport	Event	Date
Gold	Nantawan Fueangsanit; Phantipha Wongchuvej	Boules sports	Women's Petanque Doubles	July 24
Gold	Wiwat Khamtha	Muaythai	Men's 57kg	July 30
Gold	Suppachai Muensang	Muaythai	Men's 71kg	July 30
Silver	Kittiphob Phrommat	Air sports	Mixed Paramotor Slalom	July 23
Silver	Thanakorn Sangkaew	Boules sports	Men's Petanque Precision Shooting	July 24
Silver	Sarawut Sriboompeng; Thanakorn Sangkaew	Boules sports	Men's Petanque Doubles	July 24
Silver	Nantawan Fueangsanit	Boules sports	Women's Petanque Precision Shooting	July 24
Silver	Apasara Koson	Muaythai	Women's 51kg	July 30
Bronze	Viparat Vituteerasan	Sumo	Women's Heavyweight	July 22
Bronze	Anueng Khatthamarasri	Muaythai	Men's 67kg	July 30

== Competitors ==
Sports	Men	Women	Total	Events
Air sports	3	1	4	1
Boules sports	2	2	4	4
Dancesport	1	1	2	1
Indoor rowing	1	1	2	2
Ju-jitsu	0	2	2	1
Muaythai	4	1	5	5
Sumo	1	2	3	5
Total	12	10	22	19

== Air Sports ==
Thailand qualified for the 2017 World Games:

- Paramotor Slalom
  - Kittiphob Phrommat
  - Chayaphong Pothipuk
  - Pongkorn Thanasakunkornsaeng
  - Janejira Chui-noei

== Boules Sports ==
Thailand qualified for the 2017 World Games:

- Men's Petanque Precision Shooting
  - Thanakorn Sangkaew
- Men's Petanque Doubles
  - Thanakorn Sangkaew
  - Sarawut Sriboompeng
- Women's Petanque Precision Shooting
  - Nantawan Fueangsanit
- Women's Petanque Doubles
  - Nantawan Fueangsanit
  - Phantipha Wongchuvej

== Dancesport ==
Thailand qualified for the 2017 World Games:

- Latin
  - Puttisit Promna
  - Nattanicha Ittisophonpisarn

== Indoor rowing ==
Thailand qualified for the 2017 World Games:

- Men's Lightweight 2000m
  - Jaruwat Saensuk
- Women's Lightweight 2000m
  - Phuttharaksa Neegree

== Ju-jitsu ==
Thailand qualified for the 2017 World Games:

- Women's Duo
  - Suphawadee Kaeosrasaen
  - Kunsatri Kumsroi

== Muaythai ==
Thailand qualified for the 2017 World Games:

- Men's 54kg
  - Pranom Sung-ngoen
- Men's 57kg
  - Wiwat Khamtha
- Men's 67kg
  - Anueng Khatthamarasri
- Men's 71kg
  - Suppachai Muensang
- Women's 51kg
  - Apasara Koson

== Sumo ==
Thailand qualified for the 2017 World Games:

- Men's Lightweight
  - Jakkrapong Chaorungmetee
- Men's Open Weight
  - Jakkrapong Chaorungmetee
- Women's Heavyweight
  - Viparat Vituteerasan
- Women's Middleweight
  - Kamonchanok Amnuaypol
- Women's Open Weight
  - Kamonchanok Amnuaypol
  - Viparat Vituteerasan
