= Austria at the 2017 World Games =

- IOC code: AUT
- NOC: Austrian Olympic Committee
- Website: www.oeoc.at

in Wrocław, Poland 20 July 2017 – 30 July 2017
- Competitors: 10 in 2 sports

World Games appearances
- 1981; 1985; 1989; 1993; 1997; 2001; 2005; 2009; 2013; 2017; 2022; 2025

Austria competed at the World Games 2017 in Wrocław, Poland, from 20 July 2017 to 30 July 2017.

== Competitors ==
Sports	Men	Women	Total	Events
Archery	1	1	2	2
Billiards	1	0	1	1
Dancesport	3	3	6	3
Fistball	9	0	9	1
Ju-jitsu	2	2	4	2
Karate	0	2	2	2
Kickboxing	0	2	2	2
Muaythai	0	1	1	1
Orienteering	1	1	2	5
Roller sports	1	0	1	4
Rowing	2	2	4	4
Rhythmic gymnastics	0	1	1	1
Sport climbing	0	2	2	2
Waterskiing	1	0	1	1
Total	21	17	38	31

== Fistball ==
Austria has qualified at the 2017 World Games in the Fistball Men Team event.

== Gymnastic ==
=== Rhythmic gymnastics ===
Austria has qualified at the 2017 World Games:

- Women's individual event - 1 quota

== Karate ==
Bettina Plank competed in the women's kumite 50 kg event and Alisa Buchinger competed in the women's kumite 68 kg event.
