= Kazakhstan at the 2017 World Games =

Kazakhstan at the World Games 2017
- IOC code: KAZ
- NOC: National Olympic Committee of the Republic of Kazakhstan

in Wrocław, Poland 20 July 2017 – 30 July 2017
- Competitors: 16 in 8 sports

World Games appearances
- 1981; 1985; 1989; 1993; 1997; 2001; 2005; 2009; 2013; 2017; 2022; 2025

Kazakhstan competed at the World Games 2017 in Wrocław, Poland, from 20 July 2017 to 30 July 2017.

== Competitors ==
Sports	Men	Women	Total
Dance Sports	1	1	2
Ju-Jitsu	1	0	1
Karate	2	0	2
Kickboxing	2	1	3
Muaythai	4	0	3
Powerlifting	2	0	2
Rhythmic Gymnastics	0	1	1
Trampoline Gymnastics	1	0	1
Total	13	3	16

== Gymnastic ==
=== Rhythmic Gymnastics ===
Kazakhstan has qualified at the 2017 World Games:

- Women's individual event - 2 quota

=== Trampoline ===
Kazakhstan has qualified at the 2017 World Games:

- Men's Individual Tumbling - 1 quota

== Karate ==
Kazakhstan has qualified at the 2017 World Games:

- Men's Individual Kumite -67kg- 1 quota (Rinat Sagandykov)
- Men's Individual Kumite -75kg- 1 quota (Yermek Ainazarov)

== Kickboxing ==
Kazakhstan has qualified at the 2017 World Games:

- Men's -91kg – 1 quota (Askat Zhantursynov)
- Men's +91kg – 1 quota (Yersultan Bekenov)
- Women's -60kg – 1 quota (Shara Khamzina)
