= Belarus at the 2017 World Games =

Belarus at the World Games 2017
- IOC code: BLR
- NOC: Belarus Olympic Committee

in Wrocław, Poland 20 July 2017 – 30 July 2017
- Competitors: 22 in 8 sports
- Medals Ranked 14th: Gold 4 Silver 2 Bronze 5 Total 11

World Games appearances
- 1981; 1985; 1989; 1993; 1997; 2001; 2005; 2009; 2013; 2017; 2022; 2025

Belarus competed at the World Games 2017 in Wrocław, Poland, from 20 July 2017 to 30 July 2017.

== Medalists ==
Medal	Name	Sport	Event	Date
Gold	Dmitry Gavrilov	Finswimming	Men's 100m Bi-Fin	July 21
Gold	Natalia Berdnikava	Water skiing	Women's trick	July 26
Gold	Natalia Berdnikava	Water skiing	Women's jump	July 27
Silver	Volha Melnik; Artur Beliakou	Acrobatic gymnastics	Mixed pairs all-around	July 24
Silver	Julia Ivonchyk; Veranika Nabokina; Karina Sandovich	Acrobatic gymnastics	Women's groups all-around	July 25
Bronze	Katsiaryna Halkina	Rhythmic gymnastics	Individual ball	July 21
Bronze	Dmitry Gavrilov	Finswimming	Men's 50m Bi-Fin	July 22
Bronze	Katsiaryna Halkina	Rhythmic gymnastics	Individual ribbon	July 22
Bronze	Aliaksandr Isayeu	Water skiing	Men's jump	July 27

== Competitors ==
Sports	Men	Women	Total	Events
Acrobatic gymnastics	1	5	6	3
Finswimmng	2	0	2	2
Muaythai	5	1	6	6
Orienteering	0	1	1	2
Rhythmic gymnastics	0	2	2	1
Rowing	1	0	1	1
Trampoline	2	2	4	3
Tumbling	1	0	1	1
Waterskiing	1	1	2	4
Total	13	12	25	22

== Gymnastic ==
=== Rhythmic gymnastics ===
Belarus has qualified at the 2017 World Games:

- Women's individual event - 2 quota

=== Trampoline ===
Belarus has qualified at the 2017 World Games:

- Men's Individual Tumbling - 1 quota
- Men's Synchronized Trampoline - 1 quota
- Women's Synchronized Trampoline - 1 quota

== Muaythai ==
Belarus has qualified at the 2017 World Games:

- Men's -71 kg - 1 quota place (Andrei Kulebin)
- Men's -75 kg - 1 quota place (Vitaly Gurkov)
- Men's -81 kg - 1 quota place (Dmitry Valent)
- Men's -86 kg - 1 quota place (Anatoliy Vanakov)
