= Czech Republic at the 2017 World Games =

Czech Republic at the World Games 2017
- IOC code: CZE
- NOC: Czech Olympic Committee

in Wrocław, Poland 20 July 2017 – 30 July 2017
- Medals: Gold 2 Silver 1 Bronze 4 Total 7

World Games appearances
- 1981; 1985; 1989; 1993; 1997; 2001; 2005; 2009; 2013; 2017; 2022; 2025

Czech Republic competed at the World Games 2017 in Wrocław, Poland, from 20 July 2017 to 30 July 2017. It won 2 gold, 1 silver and 4 bronze medals.

== Competitors ==
| Sports | Men | Women | Total | Events |
|---|---|---|---|---|
| Sport Climbing | 1 | 0 | 1 | 1 |
| Total | 1 | 0 | 1 | 1 |

== Sport Climbing ==
Czech Republic has qualified at the 2017 World Games:

- Men's Speed – Libor Hroza
