= Hala Orbita =

Indoor arena in Wrocław, Poland

Coordinates: 51°07′56.90″N 16°59′14.08″E

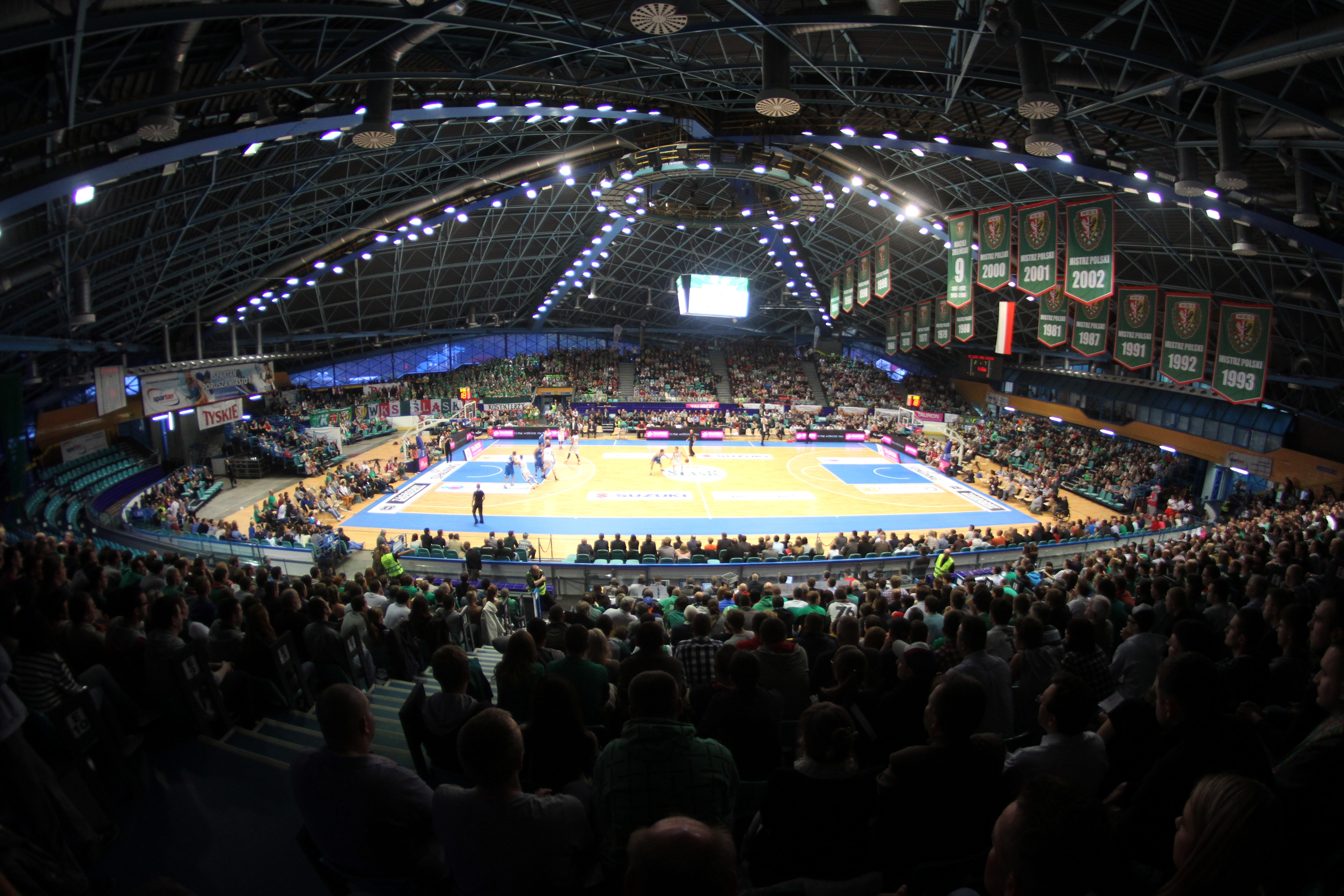
- Interactive map of Hala Orbita
- Full name: Hala Orbita
- Location: Wrocław, Poland
- Capacity: 3,000

Construction
- Built: 1992–2002
- Opened: 2004
- Architect: Marek Dziekoński

Tenants
- Śląsk Wrocław (basketball); Śląsk Wrocław (handball); Gwardia Wrocław (men's volleyball); Gwardia Wrocław (women's volleyball)

Hala Orbita is a multi-purpose Indoor arena in Wrocław, Poland. It hosts the home games of Śląsk Wrocław basketball club, Śląsk Wrocław handball club and Gwardia Wrocław men's and women's volleyball clubs. It has a seating capacity for 3,000 people. It is used to host sport events like volleyball, handball, basketball, indoor football, gymnastics, fencing as well as a venue for competitions of martial arts, concerts, artistic events, fairs, exhibitions and congresses.
