= Russia at the 2017 World Games =

Russia at the World Games 2017
- IOC code: RUS
- NOC: Russian Olympic Committee

in Wrocław, Poland 20 July 2017 – 30 July 2017
- Competitors: 133 in 20 sports
- Medals Ranked 1st: Gold 28 Silver 21 Bronze 14 Total 63

World Games appearances (overview)
- 1981; 1985; 1989; 1993; 1997; 2001; 2005; 2009; 2013; 2017; 2022; 2025

Russia competed at the World Games 2017 in Wrocław, Poland, from 20 July 2017 to 30 July 2017. Russia has competed at the World Games since 1993, following the dissolution of the Soviet Union in 1991.

For Russia, the 2017 World Games were the most successful by number of medals and by medal weight. Russian sportspeople won 28 gold medals, 21 silver medals and 14 bronze medals, surpassing the previous record made in 2005 World Games in Duisburg, Germany.

== Medalists ==
Medal	Name	Sport	Event	Date
Gold	Arina Averina	Rhythmic gymnastics	Individual ball	July 21
Gold	Arina Averina	Rhythmic gymnastics	Individual hoop	July 21
Gold	Dmitrii Zhurman	Finswimming	Men's surface 100 m	July 21
Gold	Valeriya Baranovskaya	Finswimming	Women's surface 200 m	July 21
Gold	Dmitrii Zhurman	Finswimming	Men's surface 100 m	July 21
Gold	Pavel Kabanov	Finswimming	Men's apnoea 50 m	July 22
Gold	Andrey Arbuzov	Finswimming	Men's bi fins 50 m	July 22
Gold	Dmitry Zhurman	Finswimming	Men's surface 200 m	July 22
Gold	Ekaterina Mikhaylushkina	Finswimming	Women's surface 100 m	July 22
Gold	Pavel Kabanov; Aleksey Kazantsev; Dmitry Kokorev; Dmitry Zhurman	Finswimming	Men's surface relay 4 × 100 m	July 22
Gold	Anastasia Degtiareva; Irina Dobriagina; Veronika Korneva; Ekaterina Pykhtova; Anastasia Ziubina; Daniil Chaiun; Aleksei Germanov	Aerobic gymnastics	Open event step	July 22
Gold	Dina Averina	Rhythmic gymnastics	Individual clubs	July 22
Gold	Arina Averina	Rhythmic gymnastics	Individual ribbon	July 22
Gold	Yulia Kaplina	Sport climbing	Women's speed	July 22
Gold	Vasily Margiev	Sumo	Men's heavyweight	July 22
Gold	Batyr Altyev	Sumo	Men's lightweight	July 22
Gold	Atsamaz Kaziev	Sumo	Men's middleweight	July 22
Gold	Anna Polyakova	Sumo	Women's heavyweight	July 22
Gold	Vasily Margiev	Sumo	Men's open weight	July 23
Gold	Anna Polyakova	Sumo	Women's open weight	July 23
Gold	Marina Chernova; Georgy Pataraia	Acrobatic gymnastics	Mixed pairs all-around	July 24
Gold	Daria Guryeva; Daria Kalinina	Acrobatic gymnastics	Women's pairs all-around	July 24
Gold	Sergey Fedosienko	Powerlifting	Men's lightweight	July 24
Gold	Natalia Salnikova	Powerlifting	Women's lightweight	July 24
Gold	Daria Chebulanka; Polina Plastinina; Ksenia Zagoskina	Acrobatic gymnastics	Women's groups all-around	July 25
Gold	Mikhail Zalomin	Trampoline gymnastics	Men's double mini-trampoline	July 25
Gold	Ilia Borok	Ju-Jitsu	Men's 77 kg fighting	July 29
Gold	Svetlana Vinnikova	Muaythai	Women's 60 kg	July 30
Silver	Danil Chaiun; Garsevan Dzhanazian; Kirill Kulikov; Kirill Lobaznyuk; Roman Semenov; Anton Shishigin; Denis Shurupov; Aleksei Zhuravlev	Aerobic gymnastics	Men's open event dance	July 21
Silver	Dina Averina	Rhythmic gymnastics	Individual ball	July 21
Silver	Dina Averina	Rhythmic gymnastics	Individual hoop	July 21
Silver	Valeriya Baranovskaya; Anna Ber; Aleksandra Skurlatova; Ekaterina Mikhaylushkina	Finswimming	Women's surface relay 4 × 100 m	July 21
Silver	Dina Averina	Rhythmic gymnastics	Individual ribbon	July 22
Silver	Olga Davydko	Sumo	Women's heavyweight	July 22
Silver	Batyr Altyev	Sumo	Men's open weight	July 23
Silver	Anna Ryzhkova	Powerlifting	Women's middleweight	July 24
Silver	Igor Mishev; Nikolay Suprunov	Acrobatic gymnastics	Men's pairs all-around	July 25
Silver	Anna Korobeinikova	Trampoline gymnastics	Women's tumbling	July 25
Silver	Dmitry Inzarkin	Powerlifting	Men's heavyweight	July 25
Silver	Natalia Gemperle	Orienteering	Women's middle distance	July 26
Silver	Olga Kulikova; Dmitry Zharkov	Dancesport	Standard	July 28
Silver	Pavel Korzhavykh	Ju-Jitsu	Men's 69 kg fighting	July 29
Silver	Denis Belov	Ju-Jitsu	Men's 85 kg fighting	July 29
Silver	Denis Belov; Ilia Borok; Abdulbari Guseinov; Pavel Korzhavykh; Olga Medvedeva; Zainutdin Zainukov	Ju-Jitsu	Mixed national team competition	July 29
Silver	Svetlana Gudyno; Armen Tsaturyan	Dancesport	Latin	July 29
Silver	Ksenia Osnovina; Konstantin Chistikov	Dancesport	Rock 'n' Roll	July 29
Silver	Valeriya Drozdova	Muaythai	Women's 54 kg	July 30
Silver	Aleksandr Abramov	Muaythai	Men's 57 kg	July 30
Silver	Vladimir Kuzmin	Muaythai	Men's 67 kg	July 30
Bronze	Pavel Kabanov	Finswimming	Men's surface 100 m	July 21
Bronze	Alexey Rubtsov	Sport climbing	Men's Boulder	July 21
Bronze	Dmitry Kokorev	Finswimming	Men's surface 200 m	July 22
Bronze	Anna Ber	Finswimming	Women's surface 100 m	July 22
Bronze	Arina Averina	Rhythmic gymnastics	Individual clubs	July 22
Bronze	Stanislav Kokorin	Sport climbing	Men's speed	July 22
Bronze	Anna Tsyganova	Sport climbing	Women's speed	July 22
Bronze	Olga Davydko	Sumo	Women's open weight	July 23
Bronze	Maxim Shlyakin	Trampoline gymnastics	Men's tumbling	July 26
Bronze	Natalia Gemperle; Dmitry Tsvetkov; Andrey Khramov; Galina Vinogradova	Orienteering	Mixed team relay	July 27
Bronze	Abdulbari Guseinov	Ju-Jitsu	Men's 85 kg Ne-Waza	July 28
Bronze	Aleksandr Sak	Ju-Jitsu	Men's +94 kg Ne-Waza	July 28
Bronze	Aslabek Zikreev	Muaythai	Men's 54 kg	July 30
Bronze	Ivan Grigorev	Muaythai	Men's 75 kg	July 30

== Competitors ==
Sports	Men	Women	Total	Events
Air sports	4	0	4	2
Billiard	1	2	3	1
Boules sports	0	1	1	1
Dancesport	4	4	8	3
Gymnastics
Acrobatic gymnastics	8	6	14	5
Aerobic gymnastics	10	7	17	5
Rhythmic gymnastics	0	2	2	4
Trampolining	4	3	7	4
Tumbling	1	1	2	2
Finswimming	11	7	18	12
Ju-Jitsu	6	1	7	7
Kickboxing	5	2	7	7
Motorcycling	3	0	3	1
Muaythai	4	2	6	6
Orienteering	2	2	4	4
Powerlifting	2	4	6	6
Sport climbing	4	4	8	5
Squash	1	1	2	2
Sumo	4	7	11	6
Waterskiing	1	3	3	3
Total	75	59	133	86

== Gymnastic ==
=== Rhythmic Gymnastics ===
Russia has qualified at the 2017 World Games:

- Women's individual event – 2 quotas

=== Trampoline ===
Russia has qualified at the 2017 World Games:

- Men's Individual Double Mini Trampoline - 1 quota
- Men's Individual Tumbling - 1 quota
- Men's Synchronized Trampoline - 1 quota
- Women's Individual Double Mini Trampoline - 1 quota
- Women's Individual Tumbling - 1 quota
- Women's Synchronized Trampoline - 1 quota

== Muaythai ==
Russia has qualified at the 2017 World Games:

- Men's -67 kg – Magomed Zaykunov
- Men's -81 kg – Surik Magakian
- Men's -91 kg – Artem Vakhitov
