= Tommy Jones (bowler) =

American ten-pin bowler (born 1978)

Personal information
- Born: November 2, 1978 (age 47)
- Years active: 2000-present

Bowling Information
- Affiliation: PBA
- Rookie year: 2001
- Dominant hand: Right (cranker delivery)
- Wins: 20 PBA Tour (2 majors); 12 PBA Regional Tour
- 300-games: 37
- Sponsors: Ebonite, Dexter, Vise grips

Tommy Jones (born November 2, 1978) is an American professional bowler currently competing on the PBA Tour (Professional Bowlers Association). He is a member of the PBA Hall of Fame (inducted 2020) and the USBC Hall of Fame (inducted 2024). He is also an 11-time member of Team USA.

Jones, who is right-handed, has been one of the most competitive pros on the PBA Tour since 2004. He is one of only 17 players in PBA history to win at least 20 PBA Tour titles, and has won over $2 million in PBA prize money through the 2022 season, including over $300,000 in the 2005–06 season alone. Jones won the PBA Rookie of the Year Award for the 2001–02 season, and the PBA Player of the Year Award following the 2005–06 season. Jones's style is often described as that of a cranker due to his high backswing and rev rate, although some coaches (such as John Jowdy) describe him as a power stroker due to his smooth slide-step and release. He has rolled 37 perfect 300 games in PBA events throughout his career, including the PBA's 27th ever televised 300 game in 2020. He also has 12 PBA Regional Tour titles.

Jones ranked #6 on the PBA's 2025 "Best 25 PBA Players of the Last 25 Seasons" list. The ranking was based on a points system that took into account standard titles, major titles, top-five finishes and Player of the Year awards.

Jones is a member of the Ebonite Pro Staff (now owned by Brunswick as of late 2019).

== PBA career history ==
Jones joined the PBA in 2000. He currently owns 20 PBA Tour titles, two of them major championships. He won his first 12 titles in just 20 TV Finals appearances.

=== 2004–05 season ===
After making the TV finals just four times over his first three full seasons on the PBA Tour and failing to win a title, Jones had his breakout season in 2004–05. Jones made the cut to match play in 20 of 21 events and was perfect in the TV finals, winning the title in all four of his final round appearances. He won $224,130 on the season, which was more than his previous three full seasons (66 tournaments) combined. Despite the four tournament wins, Jones finished runner-up to Patrick Allen in the 2004–05 Player of the Year race.

=== 2005–06 season ===
The 2005–06 season was his best to date, as he cashed in 20 of 21 events, made match play in 19 events, made the TV finals six times, won four titles, and posted a career-best $301,700 in earnings. He won his first career major in this season, at the 63rd U.S. Open.

In 2005, Jones stopped Liz Johnson in her efforts to become the first female to win a national PBA Tour event. After Johnson defeated Wes Malott in the semifinals of the 2005 Banquet Open, she came up short against Tommy in the final, 219–192.

In this season, Jones had a 15-game TV match win streak snapped, falling one short of the all-time record set by Jim Pencak. Upon winning the 2005–06 Player of the Year award, Jones joined Mike Aulby as the only players to win both the PBA Player of the Year and PBA Rookie of the Year awards. Chris Barnes and Jason Belmonte would later also earn this distinction.

=== 2006–07 season ===
In 2006–07, Jones captured two more titles (9th and 10th overall), including his second major at the H&R Block Tournament of Champions.

=== 2007–08 season ===
With his 11th tournament win at the 2008 ConstructionJobs.com Championship in Reno, NV, Jones joined Mika Koivuniemi as the only two bowlers to win a title on all five of the PBA's "animal" oil patterns (Shark, Chameleon, Cheetah, Scorpion and Viper). He would also win the GEICO Classic in West Babylon, NY for his 12th PBA title.

=== 2008–09 season ===
The 2008–09 PBA season was the first since 2003–04 where Jones did not earn a title, although he did cash in 20 of the 21 events he participated in.

=== 2009–10 season ===
He had seven top-ten finishes in 2009–10, and won his 13th title in the 2010 Dydo Japan Cup, the final title event of the season.

=== 2010–11 season ===
In an abbreviated PBA season, he had four top-ten finishes in 12 events, including a third-place finish at the U.S. Open.

=== 2011–12 season ===
Jones won $45,000 in the PBA All-in Showdown at the 2011 World Series of Bowling, an optional, non-title event that required a $5,000 buy-in. Otherwise, it was perhaps his worst pro season, as he was unable to win a title and cashed only $17,390 in official PBA earnings.

=== 2012–13 season ===
Jones won the WBT International Bowling Championship in Inazawa, Japan on January 19, 2013. With WBT titles now counted as PBA Tour titles (if won by a full-fledged PBA member), Jones was credited with his 14th PBA title. Tommy also won the season-ending 7th Kingdom International Open in Riyadh, Saudi Arabia on December 16, 2013 for his 15th PBA title. He earned over $166,000 in 2012–13, his best season earnings since 2005–06.

=== 2014 season ===
Jones made match play six times, and appeared three times in the televised finals, but did not win a tournament.

=== 2015 season ===
On May 16, 2015, Tommy won his 16th PBA title (his first on U.S. soil since 2008) at the PBA Bear Open in Shawnee, Oklahoma. On this day, Jones rose from the #5 seed and defeated four PBA titlists, including PBA Hall of Famer Norm Duke in the final match. It would be Jones' lone title for the season, despite making the final round in a career-high eight tournaments.

=== 2016 season ===
On June 5, 2016, Jones earned his 17th PBA Tour title in the Downums Waste Services PBA Xtra Frame Jonesboro Open. With the win, Tommy moved into a 20th place tie with Hall of Famer Carmen Salvino on the all-time PBA titles list. Jones earned a $10,000 bonus for accumulating the most points (89) in the seven 2016 PBA Xtra Frame events, surpassing E. J. Tackett (84 points) in the final Xtra Frame event of the season on October 30. Jones won the PBA Scorpion Championship on December 10 at the 2016 World Series of Bowling in Reno, NV for his 18th PBA Tour title. This moved him into a tie for 15th place on the all-time PBA titles list (with five other players).

Jones earned MVP honors in the PBA League team event this season, leading his Dallas Strikers team to victory.

=== 2017 season ===
Jones made the final match of the 2017 Fire Lake PBA Tournament of Champions on February 19, 2017, but lost to top seed E. J. Tackett. As one of the top eight money leaders from the start of the 2015 season through the 2017 USBC Masters, Jones was invited to participate in the inaugural Main Event PBA Tour Finals in May 2017. Tommy placed fourth in the event.

=== 2018 season ===
Tommy struggled in 2018, making only two championship round appearances in 17 Tour events and failing to earn a title.

=== 2019 season ===
On August 23, 2019, Jones won the Bowlerstore.com Classic in Coldwater, Ohio to capture his 19th PBA Tour title overall and his first since the 2016 season. This put him a 16th place tie with Chris Barnes on the all-time titles list.

In October 2019, Jones was elected to the PBA Hall of Fame in his first year on the ballot. He was officially inducted during the PBA awards ceremony in Arlington, Texas on January 18, 2020.

Jones also won the $100,000 top prize in the Bowlero Elite Series pro-am event on December 29. This was a non-title event and the earnings do not count toward official PBA totals.

=== 2020 season ===
On January 19, 2020, one day after his induction into the PBA Hall of Fame, Jones won the PBA Hall of Fame Classic in Arlington, Texas. As the #2 seed for the stepladder finals, he defeated Chris Barnes in the semifinal match, and Darren Tang in the championship match. Jones bowled the PBA’s 27th televised 300 game in the championship match to claim his 20th PBA Tour title, which currently places him in a tie with Dick Ritger, Wayne Webb, and Amleto Monacelli for 14th on the all-time titles list. Jones' 300 game was just the third one in history rolled in a televised championship match (joining Bob Benoit and Mike Aulby), and the first-ever televised 300 game on a mixed oil pattern. (The left lane had a 45-foot pattern, while the right lane had a 38-foot pattern.)

=== 2021 season ===
Jones made no televised finals during the 2021 season, only the second time in his career this had occurred, following the 2011–12 season.

=== 2022 season ===
Based on points earned during the first 13 events of the 2022 season, including televised finals appearances in three of the five majors, Jones earned the #6 seed for the PBA Tour Playoffs. He eliminated Kyle Sherman in the Round of 16, Jesper Svensson in the quarterfinals and A. J. Johnson in the semifinals to earn the right to face #9 seed and defending champion Kyle Troup in the finals. Jones was defeated by Troup, three games to one, earning a $50,000 runner-up prize. Despite no titles, Jones cashed $170,475 in 2022 events, his highest total since the 2005–06 season.

=== 2023 season ===
Jones made only one championship round appearance in 2023, and did not win a title.

== Additional accomplishments ==
- 1999 All-Events champion at the USBC Open Championships
- Eleven-time member of Team USA
- Ranked 30th on the PBA's 2008 list of "50 Greatest Players of the Last 50 Years." Age 30 at the time, Jones was the youngest player to make the list.
- Currently owns 20 career PBA Tour titles, ranking him in a tie for 14th all-time with three other players. He also has 12 PBA Regional Tour titles.
- Holds the record for shortest time span between 1st and 10th career titles (2 years, 6 months, 7 days), beating Dick Weber's mark by just four days.
- Eclipsed $1,000,000 (U.S.) in total career PBA earnings late in the 2007–08 season, with total earnings now at over $2 million.
- Elected to the PBA Hall of Fame (Superior Performance category) in October 2019, his first time on the ballot, and officially inducted on January 18, 2020.
- Through January 2020, he has accumulated 37 perfect 300 games in PBA events, including the PBA’s 27th televised 300 game in the championship match of the 2020 PBA Hall of Fame Classic. For three years in a row (2007–2009), Jones bowled a perfect game at the Weber Cup, repeating the feat in the 2013 Weber Cup.
- First televised PBA Tour 300 game to be bowled on a mixed oil pattern (where left lane and right lane differ in oil length and layout).
- Elected to the USBC Hall of Fame (Superior Performance category) on January 18, 2024, and will be officially inducted on April 24, 2024.
- Ranked #6 on the PBA's 2025 "Best 25 PBA Players of the Last 25 Seasons" list

== Career PBA Tour titles ==
Major titles are in boldface.

1. 2004 Dydo Japan Cup (Yokohama, Japan)
2. 2004 Denver Open (Lakewood, Colorado)
3. 2005 Cambridge Credit Classic (West Babylon, New York)
4. 2005 Banquet Open (Grand Rapids, Michigan)
5. 2005 Dydo Japan Cup (Tokyo, Japan)
6. 2005 Tulsa Championship (Owasso, Oklahoma)
7. 2006 Bayer Atlanta Classic (Norcross, Georgia)
8. **2006 U.S. Open** (North Brunswick, New Jersey)
9. 2006 Ace Hardware Championship (Wickliffe, Ohio)
10. **2007 H&R Block Tournament of Champions** (Uncasville, Connecticut)
11. 2008 ConstructionJobs.com Championship (Reno, Nevada)
12. 2008 GEICO Classic (West Babylon, New York)
13. 2010 Dydo Japan Cup (Tokyo, Japan)
14. 2013 WBT International Bowling Championship (Inazawa, Japan)
15. 2013 7th Kingdom International Open (Riyadh, Saudi Arabia)
16. 2015 PBA Bear Open (Shawnee, Oklahoma)
17. 2016 Downums Waste Services PBA Jonesboro Open (Jonesboro, Arkansas)
18. 2016 PBA Scorpion Championship (Reno, Nevada)
19. 2019 Bowlerstore.com Classic (Coldwater, Ohio)
20. 2020 PBA Hall of Fame Classic (Arlington, Texas)

== Career statistics ==
Statistics are through the last complete PBA Tour season.

Season	Events	Cashes	Match Play	CRA+	PBA Titles	Average	Earnings ($)
2000	3	1	1	0	0	211.42	2,150
2001–02	27	20	11	1	0	213.08	45.440
2002–03	19	17	17	2	0	218.57	65,835
2003–04	20	18	15	1	0	219.25	76,383
2004–05	21	21	20	4	4	222.99	224,130
2005–06	21	20	19	6	4	221.68	301,700
2006–07	21	20	16	3	2	221.76	142,482
2007–08	21	21	15	3	2	220.27	103,505
2008–09	21	20	14	2	0	216.87	74,970
2009–10	19	19	13	3	1	220.23	110,910
2010–11	12	7	5	3	0	219.03	46,810
2011–12	12	9	2	0	0	218.24	17,390
2012–13	25	18	9	3	2	221.37	166,056
2014	17	14	6	3	0	221.33	65,115
2015	24	15	9	8	1	218.27	65,890
2016	26	18	7	4	2	218.66	99,267
2017	21	15	7	2	0	220.73	76,630
2018	17	12	6	2	0	213.98	36,150
2019	25	13	5	1	1	213.15	43,160
2020	13	6	4	2	1	--	61,700
2021	17	13	13	4	0	217.18	36,350
2022	15	10	10	5	0	221.34	170,475
2023	18	7	2	1	0	213.02	52,350

+CRA = Championship Round Appearances

== Personal ==
Jones is a current resident of Simpsonville, South Carolina, and has one daughter from a previous marriage.

He was a standout shortstop and pitcher for four years of high school baseball.
