= Bowling at the 2017 World Games – Men's single =

Men's Single Bowling at the 2017 World Games
- Venue: Sky Tower
- Location: Wrocław, Poland
- Dates: 22 July
- Competitors: 16 from 12 nations

Medalists
| gold medal | Youngseon Cho | South Korea |
| silver medal | Ildemaro Ruiz | Venezuela |
| bronze medal | Tobias Bording | Germany |

The Men's Single event of the Bowling at the 2017 World Games will be held on 22 July 2017.

== Single Men ==
=== Qualifications ===
| Rank | Bowler | Nation | Score | Note |
|---|---|---|---|---|
| 1 | Thomas Larsen | Denmark | 1420 | Q |
| 2 | Ricardo Lecuona | Mexico | 1420 | Q |
| 3 | Ildemaro Ruiz | Venezuela | 1414 | Q |
| 4 | Qi En Kuek | Singapore | 1401 | Q |
| 5 | Youngseon Cho | South Korea | 1400 | Q |
| 6 | Osku Palermaa | Finland | 1397 | Q |
| 7 | Tobias Bording | Germany | 1395 | Q |
| 8 | Salvatore Polizzotto | Italy | 1389 | Q |
| 9 | Arturo Quintero | Mexico | 1389 | Q |
| 10 | Michael Mak | Hong Kong | 1386 | Q |
| 11 | Dan Maclelland | Canada | 1378 | Q |
| 12 | Massimiliano Fridegotto | Venezuela | 1369 | Q |
| 13 | Tommy Jones | United States | 1368 | Q |
| 14 | Shogo Wada | Japan | 1366 | Q |
| 15 | Massimiliano Celli | Italy | 1366 | Q |
| 16 | Juhani Tonteri | Finland | 1353 | Q |
| 17 | Jeffrey Van De Wakker | Netherlands | 1339 | |
| 18 | Francois Lavoie | Canada | 1333 | |
| 19 | Yuhi Shimbata | Japan | 1322 | |
| 20 | Heewon Kang | South Korea | 1317 | |
| 21 | Hung Kun-Yi | Chinese Taipei | 1309 | |
| 22 | Andrés Gómez | Colombia | 1303 | |
| 23 | Andreas Gripp | Germany | 1303 | |
| 24 | Wu Siu Hong | Hong Kong | 1303 | |
| 25 | Marcus Kiew | Singapore | 1281 | |
| 26 | Jesper Agerbo | Denmark | 1251 | |
| 27 | Alessandro Silletti | Poland | 1229 | |
| 28 | Patryk Preus | Poland | 1224 | |
| 29 | Marshall Kent | United States | 1218 | |
| 30 | Hsieh Chin-Liang | Chinese Taipei | 1214 | |
| 31 | Johnny Spil | Netherlands | 1171 | |
| 32 | Óscar Rodríguez | Colombia | 1152 | |

=== Competition bracket ===
Round of 16
1 | (Denmark) Thomas Larsen | 2
16 | (Finland) Juhani Tonteri | 1
9 | (Mexico) Arturo Quintero | 0
8 | (Italy) Salvatore Polizzotto | 2
12 | (Venezuela) Massimiliano Fridegotto | 0
5 | (South Korea) Youngseon Cho | 2
13 | (United States) Tommy Jones | 2
4 | (Singapore) Qi En Kuek | 0
3 | (Venezuela) Ildemaro Ruiz | 2
14 | (Japan) Shogo Wada | 0
11 | (Canada) Dan Maclelland | 2
6 | (Finland) Osku Palermaa | 0
7 | (Germany) Tobias Bording | 2
10 | (Hong Kong) Michael Mak | 1
15 | (Italy) Massimiliano Celli | 2
2 | (Mexico) Ricardo Lecuona | 0

Quarter-finals
1 | (Denmark) Thomas Larsen | 1
8 | (Italy) Salvatore Polizzotto | 2
5 | (South Korea) Youngseon Cho | 2
13 | (United States) Tommy Jones | 1
3 | (Venezuela) Ildemaro Ruiz | 2
11 | (Canada) Dan Maclelland | 1
7 | (Germany) Tobias Bording | 2
15 | (Italy) Massimiliano Celli | 1

Semi-finals
8 | (Italy) Salvatore Polizzotto | 1
5 | (South Korea) Youngseon Cho | 2
3 | (Venezuela) Ildemaro Ruiz | 2
7 | (Germany) Tobias Bording | 0

Final
5 | (South Korea) Youngseon Cho | 2
3 | (Venezuela) Ildemaro Ruiz | 0
Third place
8 | (Italy) Salvatore Polizzotto | 0
7 | (Germany) Tobias Bording | 2

== Results ==
| Rank | Fencer | Country |
|---|---|---|
| 1st place, gold medalist(s) | Youngseon Cho | South Korea |
| 2nd place, silver medalist(s) | Ildemaro Ruiz | Venezuela |
| 3rd place, bronze medalist(s) | Tobias Bording | Germany |
| 4 | Salvatore Polizzotto | Italy |
| 5 | Massimiliano Celli | Italy |
| 5 | Tommy Jones | United States |
| 5 | Thomas Larsen | Denmark |
| 5 | Dan Maclelland | Canada |
| 9 | Michael Mak | Hong Kong |
| 9 | Juhani Tonteri | Finland |
| 11 | Qi En Kuek | Singapore |
| 11 | Massimiliano Fridegotto | Venezuela |
| 11 | Ricardo Lecuona | Mexico |
| 11 | Osku Palermaa | Finland |
| 11 | Arturo Quintero | Mexico |
| 11 | Shogo Wada | Japan |
