= Muaythai at the 2017 World Games – Women's 60 kg =

World Games muaythai event

Women's 60 kg at the 2017 World Games
- Muaythai pictogram
- Venue: Orbita Hall
- Dates: 28–30 July 2017
- Competitors: 8 from 8 nations

Medalists
1st place, gold medalist(s)		Svetlana Vinnikova	Russia
2nd place, silver medalist(s)		Gia Winberg	Finland
3rd place, bronze medalist(s)		Nili Block	Israel

The women's 60 kg muaythai (Note: Muaythai is the official name of Muay Thai, recognized by International World Games Association and International Olympic Committee.) event at the 2017 World Games was held from 28 to 30 July 2017 at the Orbita Hall. 8 Muay Thai practitioners from 8 nations are expected to compete.

== Competition schedule ==
All times are in local time (UTC+2), according to the official schedule.

Legend
QF	Quarterfinals	SF	Semifinals	F	Finals

M = Morning session, A = Afternoon session, E = Evening session

Date →	Jul 28			Jul 29			Jul 30		
Event ↓	M	A	E	M	A	E	M	A	E
Women's 60 kg		QF			SF		F		

== Results ==
=== Legend ===
- RSC-B — Won by Referee Stopping Contest - Hit to Body in Round 1

=== Gold medal match ===
Gold medal match
Svetlana Vinnikova (RUS)	30
Gia Winberg (FIN)	27

=== Main bracket ===
Quarterfinals
Svetlana Vinnikova (RUS)	30
Isa Tidblad Keskikangas (SWE)	27
Marta Gusztab (POL)
Nili Block (ISR)	RSC-OC
Antje Van Der Molen (PER)	30
Nina Scheucher (AUT)	27
Gia Winberg (FIN)	30
Viktoriia Ivanets (UKR)	27

Semifinals
Svetlana Vinnikova (RUS)	29
Nili Block (ISR)	28
Antje Van Der Molen (PER)	28
Gia Winberg (FIN)	29

Gold medal match
Svetlana Vinnikova (RUS)	30
Gia Winberg (FIN)	27

=== Bronze medal match ===
Bronze medal match
Nili Block (ISR)	30
Antje Van Der Molen (PER)	27
