= Sport bowling =

Form of ten pin bowling

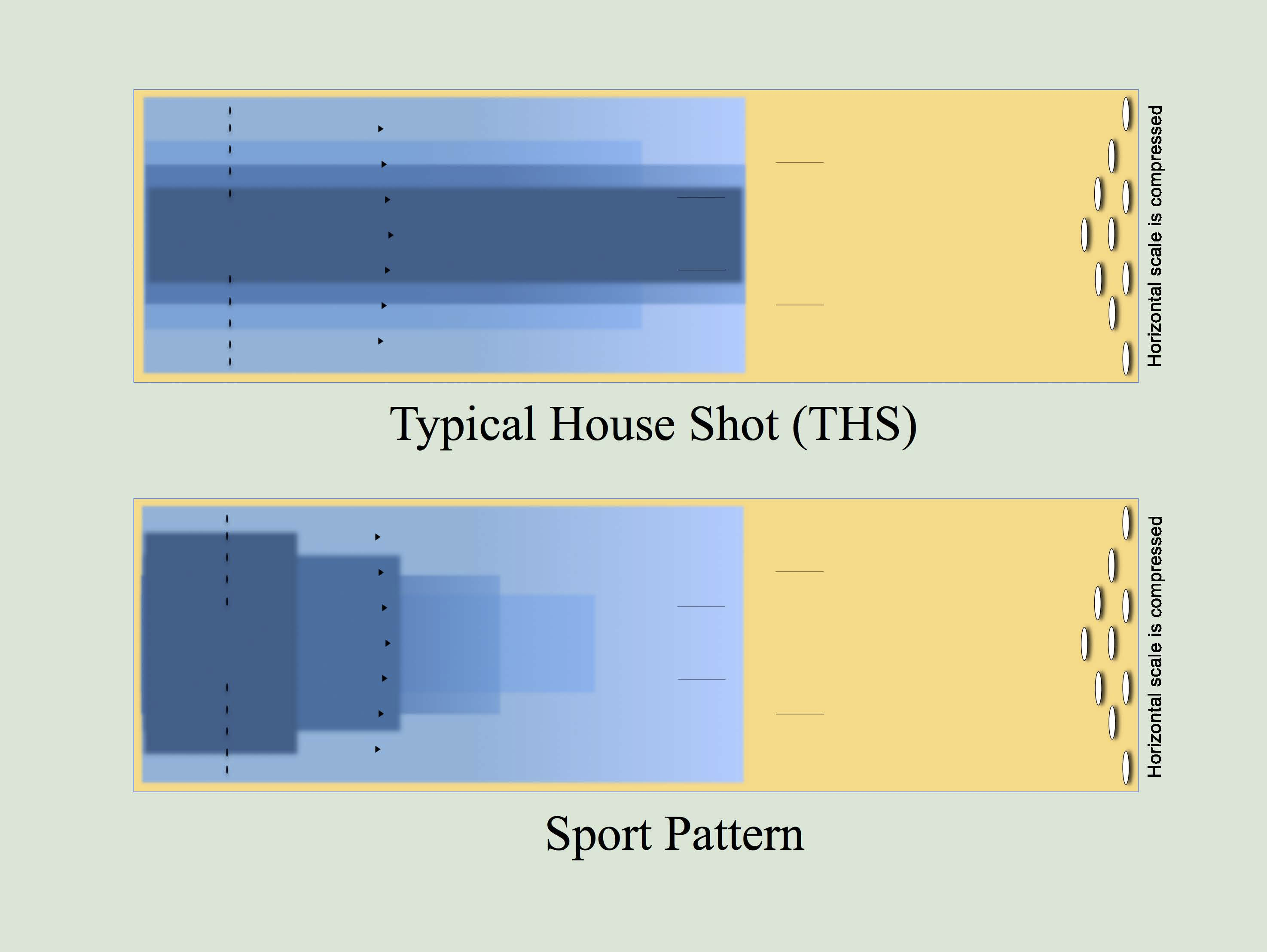
"Sport shots (or sports patterns)"—the oil patterns in sport bowling and most professional bowling—are designed to challenge bowlers more than the "typical house shots (THS)" that bowling alleys use to make it easier for the general public to achieve strikes.

Sport Bowling is any form of ten pin bowling that uses patterns of lane oil to reduce the effectiveness of modern bowling balls. It was created by the United States Bowling Congress, the governing body of the sport of ten-pin bowling, to offer players the opportunity to bowl on exactly the same lane conditions and oil patterns that professional bowlers face while on the PBA Tour. Sport Bowling originally referred to leagues, known as PBA Experience Leagues, which are offered in conjunction with the Professional Bowlers Association. However, the term is now used to refer to any bowling event which incorporates a "sport shot" or oil pattern.

As bowling technology has progressed the ability to consistently and strongly hook a bowling ball became significantly easier and as a result professional and league bowling scores increased. Over time achieving honor scores (e.g. 300 games, 800+ series) became far more common to the point of diminishing the accomplishment associated with achieving these scores. To counter this trend the idea of custom oil patterns or "sport shot" that could be programmed into a lane conditioning machine and laid on the lane emerged.

== Lane friction topography ==
Lane conditions are created by, cleaning the lane surface and then applying lane oil in a pattern via a lane oiling machine. Lane oil is designed to both protect the surface and influence the bowling ball hook. Ball hook is the product of its surface material (cover stock), balance (core), the direction of travel, speed of delivery, and spin (angular momentum). As the ball travels toward the pins it interacts with the lane surface and reacts to friction. As the ball encounters friction its angular momentum is consumed changing its trajectory. In areas of the lane where there is less oil the ball will change direction (hook) and in areas of the lane where there is more oil the ball will not change direction (skid).

A "topographic map" that illustrates the location and quantity of oil placed on the lane can be found for each oil pattern. Areas within zones that contain a large volume of oil are depicted as high terrain and areas with a small volume of oil are depicted as low terrain. Bowlers can use these maps to formulate strategies to manipulate their ball to cross this frictional landscape.

== Break point ==
Each oil pattern has a "breakpoint" at which the bowling ball moves off of the most heavily oiled part of the lane onto the "back end". The back end is the place where the majority of the bowling ball hook is desired by an experienced bowler because it creates "angle to the pocket". Bowling balls that simultaneously (or almost simultaneously) hit the one and two pin on a strong angle (up to 6 degrees) from the left side or the one and three pin from the right side are very likely to strike. A properly executed "pocket hit" causes the bowling ball to travel off-center through the pins driving these into other pins either directly or off of the walls on either side of the pin deck. It's the side-to-side "pin action" that creates a greater likelihood to strike.

The "Rule of 31" is be used to estimate the break point for different patterns (calculated as the distance of length of the oil pattern in feet minus 31. This value indicates the board on the lane at the end of the oil pattern that is approximately the break point.

== House patterns ==
A typical "house pattern" ranges from 38 to 42 feet in length and the oil is tapered from the outside to the center such that the outside of the lane has the least amount of oil and the center has the most. The lack of oil on the outside of the lane and an abundance of oil near the center creates a funnel effect that causes balls rolled on the outside of the lane to hook to the pins and balls rolled in middle of the lane to slide to the pins.

== USBC Sport Certified - PBA Experience Patterns ==
USBC sport patterns range from 32 to 53 feet in length, creating a break point either much further up or back on the lane as compared to a typical house pattern. An even application of oil across the width of the lane largely eliminates the funnel effect built into the typical house shot thus requiring greater accuracy and speed control to consistently hit the break point with the desired back end reaction.

In each pattern, oil volume is applied consistently within each of up to 8 defined zones. Pattern definitions are changed regularly between tournaments, so patterns with the same name will have multiple official definitions over time. To master each sport shot requires knowledge and experience to understand where to play and how to adjust as the pattern changes.

== First generation patterns ==
- Chameleon (43-feet) Bowlers must be versatile in many styles of play, just like a chameleon has many different colors for many uses.
- Cheetah (35-feet) A cheetah may look harmless, but it has a dangerous side like this pattern: with a fast scoring pace and play near the gutter, there's no room for error.
- Scorpion (43-feet) A scorpion is dangerous and unpredictable, like this pattern. If you can't find the right groove on the lanes, you'll be stung!
- Shark (47-feet) This pattern forces bowlers to play deep inside the center of the lanes, like sharks that troll the depths of the ocean.
- Viper (37-feet) A viper strikes with multiple angles of attack. This pattern will challenge players to attack the pins from multiple angles in order to score well.

== Second generation patterns ==
Introduced by the PBA May 7, 2013.

- Badger (52-feet) is the longest PBA animal oil pattern be prepared to play straight keeping your break point closer to the pocket
- Bear (40-feet) a flat pattern that has been characterized as the most difficult test in professional bowling with a flat 1 to 1 side-to-side oil ratio
- Wolf (32-feet) is the shortest PBA animal oil pattern attack the pattern with the intent of stretching the pattern down the lane
