= 2006–07 PBA Tour season =

PBA Bowling Tour: 2006–07 Season
- League: Professional Bowlers Association
- Sport: Ten-pin bowling
- Duration: September 26, 2006 – April 1, 2007

PBA Tour
- Season MVP: Doug Kent

PBA Tour seasons
- ← 2005–06 2007–08 →

This is the 2006–07 season in review for the Professional Bowlers Association (PBA) Tour. It was the Tour's 48th season and consisted of 21 events.

== Season highlights ==
- Walter Ray Williams Jr. broke Earl Anthony's PBA record for career standard titles with his 42nd win in the opening Dydo Japan Cup. This win also gave him a title in 14 consecutive seasons, one short of Anthony's 1970–84 run.
- The PBA's 17th and 18th televised 300 games were bowled this season: Tony Reyes rolled the first at the Motor City Classic; Ryan Shafer rolled the second at the Pepsi Championship. Shafer's string of strikes was eventually snapped at 18, besting Paul Koehler's previous record of 15 consecutive strikes on TV over two matches (1995 U.S. Open).
- Sean Rash became just the second bowler (Hugh Miller was the other) to win titles in his first three televised appearances.
- Doug Kent became just the sixth PBA player in history to win two major titles in a season, capturing the USBC Masters and Denny's World Championship en route to PBA Player of the Year honors.
- In winning the 64th U.S. Open, Pete Weber tied Anthony's then-record of eight majors won (not counting ABC Masters titles before 2003) and, along with his father Dick Weber, became the only bowler to win four U.S. Open/BPAA All-Star titles since the inception of the PBA in 1958.
- In winning the season-ending PBA Tournament of Champions, Tommy Jones broke Dick Weber's 45-year-old record for the shortest time span between his 1st and 10th career titles (2 years, 6 months, 7 days).
- Norm Duke posted a 228.47 average, the highest ever for a PBA season.
- The Motel 6 Roll To Riches event marked announcer Dave Ryan's final PBA event. Ryan would be replaced the following season by Rob Stone.

== Awards and Leaders ==
- Player Of The Year: Doug Kent
- Rookie Of The Year: Billy Oatman
- Money Leader: Doug Kent ($200,530)
- High Average Award: Norm Duke (228.47)

== Tournament results ==
- Majors are noted in **boldface**.

Date	Event	City	Oil pattern	Winner (title #)	Runner-up	Score
Sep 26	Dydo Japan Cup	Tokyo, Japan	Standard	Walter Ray Williams Jr. (42)	Pete Weber	289–236
Oct 28	**USBC Masters**	Milwaukee, WI	Standard	Doug Kent (8)	Jack Jurek	277–230
Nov 5	Motor City Classic	Taylor, MI	Cheetah	Tony Reyes (1)	Wes Malott	255–238
Nov 12	Etonic Championship	Cheektowaga, NY	Shark	Pete Weber (33)	Doug Kent	247–196
Nov 19	Lake County Indiana Classic	Hammond, IN	Chameleon	Norm Duke (24)	Mika Koivuniemi	236–233
Nov 25	Discover Windy City Classic	Vernon Hills, IL	Scorpion	Wes Malott (2)	Chris Barnes	269–239
Dec 3	Ace Hardware Championship	Wickliffe, OH	Viper	Tommy Jones (9)	Wes Malott	222–221
Dec 10	Beltway Classic	Baltimore, MD	Cheetah	Sean Rash (2)	Parker Bohn III	279–225
Dec 17	Columbia 300 Classic	West Babylon, NY	Shark	Norm Duke (25)	Ryan Shafer	218–179
Jan 7	H&R Block Classic	Reno, NV	Chameleon	Patrick Allen (8)	Walter Ray Williams Jr.	255–247
Jan 14	Earl Anthony Medford Classic	Medford, OR	Scorpion	Sean Rash (3)	Brian Himmler	262–190
Jan 21	Dick Weber Open	Fountain Valley	Standard	Jason Couch (14)	Patrick Allen	258–236
Jan 28	Motel 6 Classic	Henderson, NV	Viper	Jason Couch (15)	Billy Oatman	236–228
Feb 4	Sun City Classic	El Paso, TX	Scorpion	Mika Koivuniemi (7)	Chris Barnes	214–185
Feb 11	GEICO Classic	Irving, TX	Shark	Chris Barnes (8)	John May	235–216
Feb 18	Go RV'ing Classic	Council Bluffs, IA	Chameleon	Patrick Allen (9)	Parker Bohn III	218–169
Feb 25	Bayer Classic	Parkersburg, WV	Cheetah	Mike Mineman (1)	Mike Machuga	223–202
Mar 4	**64th U.S. Open**	North Brunswick, NJ	U.S. Open	Pete Weber (34)	Wes Malott	210–204
Mar 18	Pepsi Championship	Indianapolis, IN	Viper	Norm Duke (26)	Ryan Shafer	235–219
Mar 25	**Denny's World Championship**	Wyoming, MI	World Champ.	Doug Kent (9)	Chris Barnes	237–216
Apr 1	**PBA Tournament of Champions**	Uncasville, CT	T of C	Tommy Jones (10)	Tony Reyes	257–222

== Other events ==
=== Motel 6 Roll To Riches ===
Doug Kent capped his Player of the Year honors with a defeat of Norm Duke, six strikes to three. Kent previously survived a sudden-death rolloff against Walter Ray Williams Jr. to advance to the final.

=== GEICO All-Star Shootout ===
Norm Duke & Walter Ray Williams Jr. won this event, held outdoors in Eureka, MO, defeating Tony Reyes and Robert Smith as they posted a 6-1 tournament record. This was the PBA's first outdoor event since 2001.
