= Billy Oatman =

American ten-pin bowler (1965–2023)

William Howard Oatman IV (December 1, 1965 – April 23, 2023) was a left-handed American ten-pin bowler and a member of the Professional Bowlers Association.

Born in Chicago, Oatman was the oldest man to win the Rookie of the Year award, as well as the first African American to achieve this feat.

During his first year on tour, 2006–07, his PBA ranking was 37. He bowled four perfect 300 games in PBA competition. Oatman had bowled over 190 perfect 300 games and over 70 800 series.

At eight years of age, he was bowling in three leagues. He worked in his mother's health food store before becoming a PBA bowler. In the 2006–07 season he became the first ever African American PBA Rookie of the Year.

== Personal ==
Billy had one daughter named Taylor Imani.

=== Death ===
Billy died from complications of a stroke. He was survived by his daughter and his father, William H. Oatman III.
