= Nili Block =

Israeli-American Muay Thai fighter and kickboxer

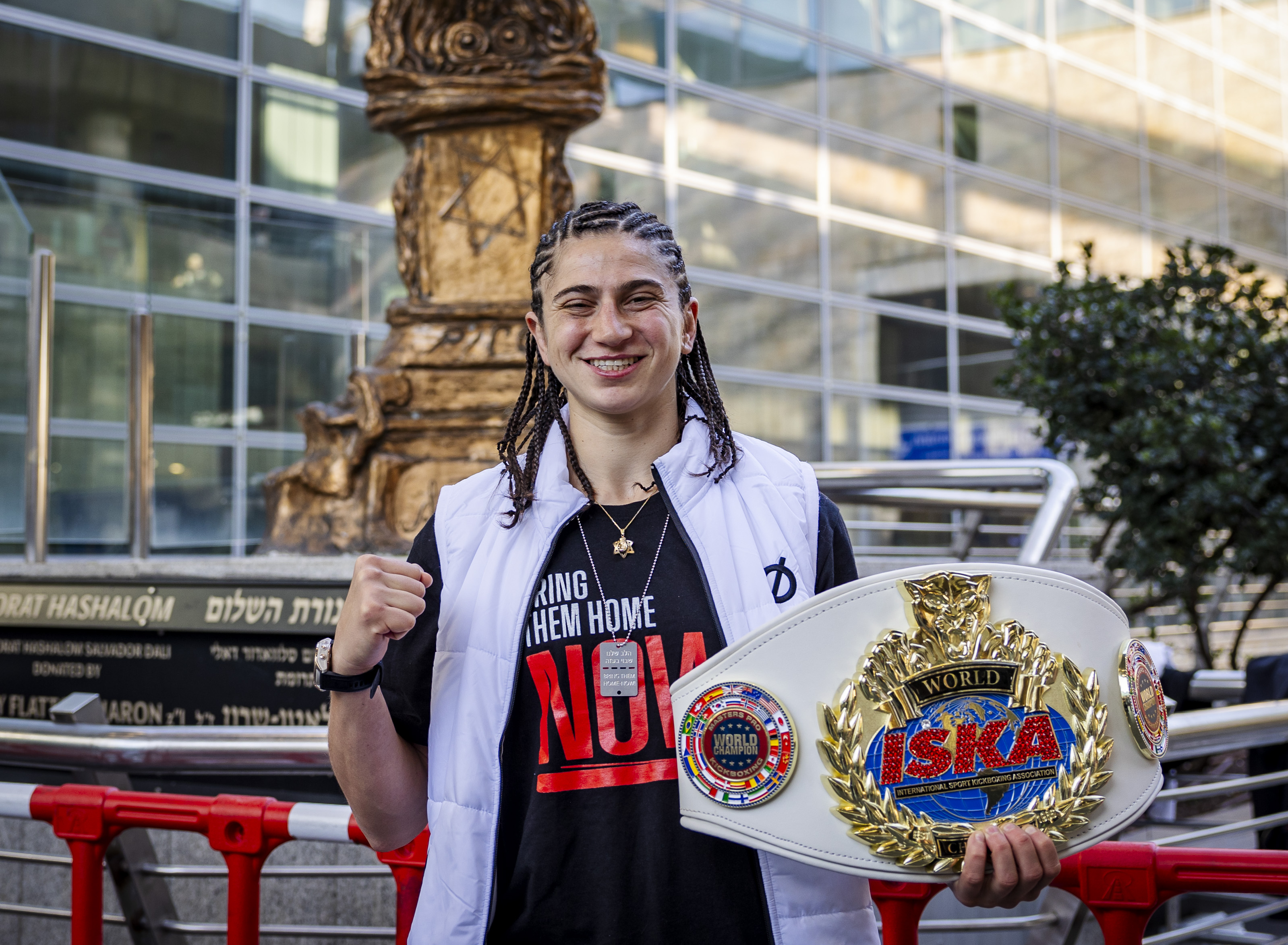
- Born: January 16, 1995 (age 31); Baltimore, Maryland, United States
- Native name: נילי בלאק
- Nationality: Israeli; American
- Style: Muay Thai, Kickboxing
- Teacher: Benny Cogan
- Trainer: Eddie Yusopov

Nili Block (Hebrew: נילי בלאק; born January 16, 1995) is a professional Muay Thai and kickboxing fighter. She is a four-time Muay Thai and two-time kickboxing world champion representing Israel.

== Early life ==
Born in Baltimore, Maryland, in the United States, Nili is one of six siblings to a dentist father and homemaker mother. Nili describes herself as a "traditional" or "observant" Jew who keeps kosher and the Jewish Sabbath, bringing kosher food with her when she travels to competitions and observing the Jewish shabbat. When Nili was two years old, her family immigrated to Israel from Maryland. They settled and now live in the religious neighborhood of Ramat Beit Shemesh in Beit Shemesh, Israel. Her mother, Rina, became a volunteer officer in the Israel Defense Forces Border Police.

At age 11, Nili began representing Israel in international competitions as a member of the Israeli Women's American Flag Football National Team. She gave up the sport in 2012 in order to focus more fully on a single sport: Muay Thai.

In 2013, in 12th grade, as a student at "Amit Noga" ulpana in Beit Shemesh, a high school for Orthodox girls, Nili beat hundreds of other girls in the 10K run of the 2013 Jerusalem Marathon.

As her sports are not supported by Olympic-style budgets, Nili cleans homes and delivers newspapers to pay for her travel and training.

== Kickboxing and Muay Thai career ==
When she was 10 years old, Nili's mother suggested she learn kickboxing, as a manner of self-defense. She trained at a kickboxing academy at Teddy Stadium in Jerusalem.

Her coach her entire career has been Benny Cogan, who is also Israel's national kickboxing and Muay Thai coach, and she is trained as well by Eddie Yusupov.

Nili is designated as an "outstanding athlete" by the Israel Defense Forces, which allows her to be in a special program that permits her to compete in international kickboxing competitions.

In 2012 she became world champion in the flyweight class (50.5-53.5 kilos) at the 10th Amateur/Pro-Am Muay Thai Championships in Bangkok, Thailand.

In May 2015, when she was in 12th grade, Block won a gold medal in her age category in the XIX KickBox World Cup in the 52- to 56-kilo category in Hungary.

In October 2015, Block won a gold medal at the Kickboxing World Championships in Belgrade, Serbia, in the 60 kg (132 pound) senior division. She said: "It is such a good feeling [being a champion].... it's so special to become a symbol in the world as a Jew and as an Israeli. They didn't expect me to win, coming from such a small country. Who would have expected it?" That year she was named Female Athlete of the Year by the Federation of Non-Olympic Competitive Sports in Israel (Ayelet).

In 2016, at 20 years of age, she won the 17th International Federation of Muaythai Amateur (IFMA) World Championship for the first time, in the 60 kg division, in Jonkoping, Sweden.

In 2017, Nili won the gold medal at the Muay Thai World Championship in the 60 kg division.

She is also the two-time defending European champion. In October 2017, she won the gold medal at the Thai Boxing European Championships in the women's 60 kg division in Paris, France.

That year, in July she also won a bronze medal in Muay Thai at the 2017 World Games in Wroclaw, Poland, taking third in the women's 60 kg Muay Thai event.

== Championships and accomplishments ==
=== Muay Thai and Kickboxing ===
==== Professional ====
- International Sport Karate Association
  - 2019 ISKA Low Kick World Lightweight (-60 kg) Champion
  - 2024 ISKA Oriental rules World Lightweight (-60 kg) Champion

==== Amateur ====
- World Association of Kickboxing Organizations
  - 2014 WAKO Kickboxing European Championships K-1 (-60 kg) - Bronze Medal
  - 2015 WAKO Kickboxing World Championships K-1 (-60 kg) - Gold Medal
- International Federation of Muaythai Amateur
  - 2014 IFMA European Championships (-60 kg) - Gold Medal
  - 2016 IFMA World Championships (-60 kg) - Gold Medal
  - 2017 IFMA World Championship (-60 kg) - Gold Medal
  - 2017 IFMA European Championships (-60 kg) - Gold Medal
  - 2018 IFMA World Championship (-60 kg) - Gold Medal
  - 2018 FISU Muaythai World Championships (-60 kg) - Gold Medal
  - 2018 IFMA European Championships (-60 kg) - Gold Medal
  - 2018 EMF Antalya Open (-60 kg) - Gold Medal
  - 2019 IFMA World Championship (-60 kg) - Gold Medal
  - 2019 IFMA European Championships (-60 kg) - Gold Medal
- World Games
  - 2017 World Games Muay Thai (-60 kg) - Bronze Medal
  - 2022 World Games Muay Thai (-60 kg) - Silver Medal

=== Sambo ===
- Fédération Internationale de Sambo
  - 2024 FIAS World Sambo Cup in Kyrgyzstan Combat Sambo 65 kg Silver Medal

== Mixed martial arts record ==
Professional record breakdown
1 match	1 win	0 losses
By knockout	1	0

Res.	Record	Opponent	Method	Event	Date	Round	Time	Location	Notes
Win	1–0	Stefani de Macedo	TKO (punches)	FFC 104	May 27, 2026	2	2:24	Lima, Peru	Bantamweight debut.

== Muay Thai and Kickboxing record ==
Professional Kickboxing & Muay Thai record
Date	Result	Opponent	Event	Location	Method	Round	Time
2026-07-27	Win	(Brazil) Isabele Celestrino	Gordon Fight Nights 1	Tel Aviv, Israel	Decision (unanimous)	3	3:00
2024-02-08	Win	(Belgium) Hélène Connart	Lidon vs Benzaquen	Paris, France	TKO (Doctor stoppage)	3	3:00
Wins the vacant ISKA Oriental rules World -61kg title.
2023-08-09	Win	(Argentina) Malena Garcia	Jomtalay, Phetchbuncha Stadium	Ko Samui, Thailand	Decision	5	2:00
2019-12-12	Win	(France) Stephanie Ielo Page	Championnat Du Monde Kickboxing	Paris, France	Decision	5	3:00
Wins the ISKA Low Kick World -61kg title.
2019-03-09	Loss	(France) Maurine Atef	TEK Fight II	Meaux, France	Decision	3	3:00
2018-09-09	Loss	(China) Cong Wang	Kunlun Fight 76 - Legend of Mulan Tournament Semifinal	Zhangqiu, China	Decision	3	3:00
2018-09-09	Win	(China) Li Mingrui	Kunlun Fight 76 - Legend of Mulan Tournament Quarterfinal	Zhangqiu, China	KO (High kick)	1	
2014-03-21	Loss	(France) Stephanie Ielo Page	WMF World Championship, Final	Pattaya, Thailand	Decision	3	3:00
For the WMF World -60kg title.
2014-03-21	Win	(Portugal) Maria Lobo	WMF World Championship, Semi Final	Pattaya, Thailand	Decision	3	3:00
Legend: Win Loss Draw/No contest Notes

Amateur Muay Thai & Kickboxing record
Date	Result	Opponent	Event	Location	Method	Round	Time
2022-07-17	Loss	(United States) Charlsey Maner	2022 World Games, Tournament Finals	Birmingham, United States	Decision (Unanimous)	3	3:00
Wins the 2022 World Games Muay Thai -60kg Silver Medal.
2022-07-16	Win	(United Kingdom) Niamh Kinehan	2022 World Games, Tournament Semifinals	Birmingham, United States	Decision (Unanimous)	3	3:00
2022-07-15	Win	(Sweden) Ewin Ates	2022 World Games, Tournament Quarterfinals	Birmingham, United States	Decision (Unanimous)	3	3:00
2019-11-09	Win	(Russia) Darya Bialkova	2019 IFMA European Muaythai Championships, Tournament Finals	Minsk, Belarus	Decision (Unanimous)	3	3:00
Wins the 2019 IFMA European Muaythai Championships -60kg Gold Medal.
2019-11-07	Win	(Russia) Ekaterina Vinnikova	2019 IFMA European Muaythai Championships, Tournament Semifinals	Minsk, Belarus	Decision (Unanimous)	3	3:00
2019-09-01	Win	(Canada) Taylor McClatchie	2019 Chungju World Martial Arts Masterships, Tournament Finals	Chungju, China	Decision (Unanimous)	3	3:00
Wins the 2019 Chungju World Martial Arts Masterships -60kg Gold Medal.
2019-08-31	Win	(Thailand) Kaewrudee Kamtakrapoom	2019 Chungju World Martial Arts Masterships, Tournament Semifinals	Chungju, China	Decision (Unanimous)	3	3:00
2019-08-30	Win	(Mongolia) Jamiyandorj Odgerel	2019 Chungju World Martial Arts Masterships, Tournament Quarterfinals	Chungju, China	Decision (Unanimous)	3	3:00
2019-07-28	Win	(Russia) Ekaterina Vinnikova	2019 IFMA World Championships, Tournament Finals	Bangkok, Thailand	Decision (Unanimous)	3	3:00
Wins the 2019 IFMA World Championships -60kg Gold Medal.
2019-07-27	Win	(Russia) Darya Bialkova	2019 IFMA World Championships, Tournament Semifinals	Bangkok, Thailand	Decision (Unanimous)	3	3:00
2019-07-25	Win	(Slovakia) Lucia Szabová	2019 IFMA World Championships, Tournament Quarterfinals	Bangkok, Thailand	Decision (Unanimous)	3	3:00
2019-07-22	Win	(Australia) Britney Dolheguy	2019 IFMA World Championships, Tournament Opening Round	Bangkok, Thailand	Decision (Unanimous)	3	2:00
2018-11-18	Win	(Turkey) Sultan Unal	2018 EMF Antalya Muaythai Open, Tournament Finals	Antalya, Turkey	Decision (Unanimous)	3	3:00
Wins the 2018 Antalya Open -60kg Gold Medal.
2018-11-17	Win		2018 EMF Antalya Muaythai Open, Tournament Semifinals	Antalya, Turkey	Decision	3	3:00
2018-11-16	Win	(Sweden) Ewin Ates	2018 EMF Antalya Muaythai Open, Tournament Quarterfinals	Antalya, Turkey	Decision (Unanimous)	3	3:00
2018-11-15	Win	(Turkey) İlknur Kurt	2018 EMF Antalya Muaythai Open, Tournament First Round	Antalya, Turkey	Decision (Unanimous)	3	3:00
2018-07-29	Win	(Spain) Alejandra Romero Calvo	2018 FISU World Muaythai Championships, Tournament Finals	Pattaya, Thailand	TKO	2	
Wins the 2018 FISU World Muaythai Championships -60kg Gold Medal.
2018-07-29	Win	(Thailand) Tabtrai Keisnee	2018 FISU World Muaythai Championships, Tournament Semifinals	Pattaya, Thailand	TKO	3	
2018-07-07	Win	(Czech Republic) Karolina Klusova	2018 IFMA European Muaythai Championships, Tournament Finals	Prague, Czech Republic	Decision (Unanimous)	3	3:00
Wins the 2018 IFMA European Muaythai Championships -60kg Gold Medal.
2018-07-04	Win	(Finland) Gia Winberg	2018 IFMA European Muaythai Championships, Tournament Semifinals	Prague, Czech Republic	Decision (Unanimous)	3	3:00
2018-07-02	Win	(Russia) Darya Bialkova	2018 IFMA European Muaythai Championships, Tournament Quarterfinals	Prague, Czech Republic	Decision (Unanimous)	3	3:00
2018-05-19	Win	(Russia) Ekaterina Vinnikova	2018 IFMA World Muaythai Championships, Tournament Finals	Cancun, Mexico	Decision (Unanimous)	3	3:00
Wins the 2018 IFMA World Muaythai Championships -60kg Gold Medal.
2018-05-18	Win	(Belarus) Mariya Valent	2018 IFMA World Muaythai Championships, Tournament Semifinals	Cancun, Mexico	Decision (Unanimous)	3	3:00
2018-05-15	Win	(Turkey) Nagihan Kalyoncu	2018 IFMA World Muaythai Championships, Tournament Quarterfinals	Cancun, Mexico	Decision (Unanimous)	3	3:00
2018-05-15	Win	(Sweden) Isa Tidblad Keskikangas	2018 IFMA World Muaythai Championships, Tournament Opening Round	Cancun, Mexico	Decision (Unanimous)	3	3:00
2017-10-22	Win	(Russia) Ekaterina Vinnikova	2017 IFMA European Muaythai Championships, Tournament Finals	Paris, France	Decision (Unanimous)	3	3:00
Wins the 2017 IFMA European Muaythai Championships -60kg Gold Medal.
2017-10-21	Win	(Russia) Hanna Shytava	2017 IFMA European Muaythai Championships, Tournament Semifinals	Paris, France	Decision (Unanimous)	3	3:00
2017-10-20	Win	(Sweden) Isa Tidblad Keskikangas	2017 IFMA European Muaythai Championships, Tournament Quarterfinals	Paris, France	Decision (Unanimous)	3	3:00
2017-07-30	Win	(Peru) Antje Van Der Molen	2017 World Games, Bronze Medal Fight	Wroclaw, Poland	Decision (Unanimous)	3	3:00
Wins the 2017 World Games -60kg Bronze Medal.
2017-07-29	Loss	(Russia) Svetlana Vinnikova	2017 World Games, Tournament Semifinal	Wroclaw, Poland	Decision	3	3:00
2017-07-28	Win	(Poland) Marta Gusztab	2017 World Games, Tournament Quarterfinal	Wroclaw, Poland	TKO		
2017-05-11	Win	(Russia) Anastasia Nepianidi	2017 IFMA World Muaythai Championships, Tournament Final	Minsk, Belarus	Decision	3	3:00
Wins the 2017 IFMA World Championships -60kg Gold Medal.
2017-05-08	Win	(Finland) Gia Winberg	2017 IFMA World Muaythai Championships, Tournament Semifinals	Minsk, Belarus	Decision	3	3:00
2017-05-07	Win	(Ukraine) Valeria Slizchenko	2017 IFMA World Muaythai Championships, Tournament Quarterfinals	Minsk, Belarus	Decision	3	3:00
2017-05-05	Win	(Belgium) Nathalie Visschers	2017 IFMA World Muaythai Championships, Tournament First Round	Minsk, Belarus	TKO	1	
2016-11-26	Win	(France) Anaëlle Angerville	IFMA World Cup 2016 in Kazan, Tournament Final	Kazan, Russia	Decision	3	3:00
Wins the 2016 IFMA World Cup in Kazan -60kg Gold Medal.
2016-11-25	Win	(Russia) Ekaterina Vinnikova	IFMA World Cup 2016 in Kazan, Tournament Semifinals	Kazan, Russia	Decision	3	3:00
2016-10-27	Loss	(Ukraine) Natalia Martiukhina	2016 WAKO European Championships, Quarterfinals	Maribor, Slovenia	Decision (Split)	3	2:00
2016-05-28	Win	(Ukraine) Lryna Chernave	2016 IFMA World Muaythai Championships, Tournament Final	Jonkoping, Sweden	Decision (Unanimous)	3	3:00
Wins the 2016 IFMA World Championships -60kg Gold Medal.
2016-05-26	Win	(Russia) Ekaterina Vinnikuva	2016 IFMA World Muaythai Championships, Tournament Semifinals	Jonkoping, Sweden	Decision (Unanimous)	3	3:00
2016-05-24	Win	(Austria) Nina Scheucher	2016 IFMA World Muaythai Championships, Tournament Quarterfinals	Jonkoping, Sweden	Decision (Unanimous)	3	3:00
2016-05-19	Win	(South Africa) Jacqueline De Beer	2016 IFMA World Muaythai Championships, Tournament First Round	Jonkoping, Sweden	Decision (Unanimous)	3	3:00
2015-10-31	Win	(Croatia) Marija Malencia	2015 WAKO World Championships, Tournament Final	Dublin, Ireland	Decision (Split)	3	2:00
Wins the 2015 WAKO World Championships K-1 -60kg Gold Medal.
2015-10-30	Win	(Belarus) Alena Muratava	2015 WAKO World Championships, Tournament Semifinal	Dublin, Ireland	Decision (Unanimous)	3	2:00
2015-10-29	Win	(Turkey) Senay Cakir	2015 WAKO World Championships, Tournament Quarterfinal	Dublin, Ireland	Decision (Unanimous)	3	2:00
2015-10-28	Win	(France) Sara Surrel	2015 WAKO World Championships, Tournament First Round	Dublin, Ireland	Decision (Unanimous)	3	2:00
2015-08-16	Loss	(Kyrgyzstan) Valentina Shevchenko	2015 I.F.M.A. Royal World cup, Tournament quarterfinals	Bangkok, Thailand	Decision	3	3:00
2015-08-15	Win	(South Africa) Jacqueline De Beer	2015 I.F.M.A. Royal World cup, Tournament First Round	Bangkok, Thailand	TKO	3	
2014-10-24	Loss	(Belarus) Alena Muratava	2014 WAKO European Championships, Tournament Semifinals	Bilbao, Spain	Decision (Unanimous)	3	2:00
Wins the 2014 WAKO European Championships K-1 -60kg Bronze Medal.
2014-10-22	Win	(Italy) Giulia Grenci	2014 WAKO European Championships, Tournament Quarterfinals	Bilbao, Spain	Decision (Unanimous)	3	2:00
2014-10-21	Win	(Turkey) Kubra Karabag	2014 WAKO European Championships, Tournament First Round	Bilbao, Spain	Decision (Unanimous)	3	2:00
2014-09-24	Win	(Belarus) Mariya Valent	2014 IFMA European Muaythai Championships, Tournament Finals	Kraków, Poland	Decision (Unanimous)	3	3:00
Wins the 2014 IFMA European Muaythai Championships -60kg Gold Medal.
2014-09-23	Win	(Belgium) Nathalie Visschers	2014 IFMA European Muaythai Championships, Tournament Semifinals	Kraków, Poland	Decision (Unanimous)	3	3:00
Legend: Win Loss Draw/No contest Notes

== See also ==
- List of select Jewish mixed martial artists
