= 2005–06 PBA Tour season =

PBA Bowling Tour: 2005–06 Season
- League: Professional Bowlers Association
- Sport: Ten-pin bowling
- Duration: September 20, 2005 – April 9, 2006

PBA Tour
- Season MVP: Tommy Jones

PBA Tour seasons
- ← 2004–05 2006–07 →

This is the 2005–06 season in review for the Professional Bowlers Association (PBA) Tour. It was the Tour's 47th season and consisted of 22 events.

== Season highlights ==
- Sean Rash became the first bowler to win a title from a non-exempt position by defeating Mike DeVaney in the West Virginia Championship.
- Current PBA Hall of Famer Del Ballard Jr. made his first televised appearance since 1997 in the Motel 6 Phoenix Classic, but was thwarted of his 14th title (and first since the 1993 U.S. Open) by Ritchie Allen.
- Mike Scroggins won his third PBA title and first career major at the USBC Masters.
- Walter Ray Williams Jr. tied Earl Anthony's then-record of 41 PBA titles when he emerged victorious in the Denny's PBA World Championship.
- Tommy Jones earned PBA Player of the Year honors, becoming the second bowler to win both PBA Rookie of the Year and Player of the Year awards in a career (joining Mike Aulby). Jones won four titles on the season, including the 63rd U.S. Open.
- Two PBA Tour Trial events were held during the season. The first event saw Chris Loschetter, Brian Kretzer and D.J. Archer advance to the exempt field, while the second event was headlined by Kelly Kulick's PBA exemption, making her the first woman to ever capture full-time active membership in the PBA.

== Awards and leaders ==
- Player Of The Year: Tommy Jones
- Rookie Of The Year: Bill O'Neill
- Steve Nagy Sportsmanship Award: Jack Jurek
- Money Leader: Tommy Jones ($301,700)
- High Average Award: Norm Duke (224.29)

== Tournament results ==
- Majors are noted in **boldface**.

Date	Event	City	Oil pattern	Winner (title #)	Runner-up	Score
Sep 20	Dydo Japan Cup	Tokyo, Japan	Custom	Tommy Jones (5)	Norm Duke	222–215
Oct 30	Tulsa Championship	Owasso, OK	Cheetah	Tommy Jones (6)	Wes Malott	289–248
Nov 6	Mile High Classic	Lakewood, CO	Shark	Wes Malott (1)	Mika Koivuniemi	215–211
Nov 13	Greater Omaha Classic	Council Bluffs, IA	Chameleon	Mike Machuga (1)	Bill O'Neill	256–245
Nov 20	**USBC Masters**	Wauwatosa, WI	Masters (custom)	Mike Scroggins (3)	Norm Duke	245–238
Nov 27	Chicago Classic	Vernon Hills, IL	Scorpion	Jason Couch (12)	Joe Ciccone	217–204
Dec 4	BowlersParadise.com Classic	Hammond, IN	Viper	Pete Weber (32)	Ryan Shafer	189–186
Dec 11	Keystone State Championship	Mechanicsburg, PA	Chameleon	Patrick Allen (6)	Tom Baker	247–218
Dec 18	Empire State Classic	Clifton Park, NY	Scorpion	Mike Wolfe (2)	Chris Collins	268–214
Jan 8	Earl Anthony Medford Classic	Medford, OR	Shark	Brian Himmler (4)	Mika Koivuniemi	214–204
Jan 15	Dick Weber Open	Fountain Valley, CA	Chameleon	Jason Couch (13)	Parker Bohn III	241–214
Jan 22	Motel 6 Phoenix Classic	Phoenix, AZ	Shark	Ritchie Allen (2)	Del Ballard Jr.	232–207
Jan 29	Jackson Hewitt Tax Service Classic	Trussville, AL	Cheetah	Brian Voss (24)	Steve Wilson	237–190
Feb 5	Bayer Atlanta Classic	Norcross, GA	Viper	Tommy Jones (7)	Mike Scroggins	224–191
Feb 12	West Virginia Championship	Parkersburg, WV	Scorpion	Sean Rash (1)	Mike DeVaney	194–178
Feb 19	**63rd U.S. Open**	North Brunswick, NJ	U.S. Open	Tommy Jones (8)	Ryan Shafer	237–223
Feb 26	GEICO Classic	Cheektowaga, NY	Cheetah	Doug Kent (7)	Norm Duke	222–201
Mar 5	Pepsi Championship	Fairlawn, OH	Shark	Chris Collins (1)	Walter Ray Williams Jr.	245–201
Mar 19	Ace Hardware Championship	Taylor, MI	Viper	Norm Duke (23)	Chris Loschetter	275–221
Mar 26	**Denny's PBA World Championship**	Indianapolis, IN	World Champ.	Walter Ray Williams, Jr. (41)	Pete Weber	236–213
Apr 2	Great Lakes Classic	Wyoming, MI	Chameleon	Patrick Allen (7)	Patrick Healey Jr.	259–193
Apr 9	**Dexter Tournament of Champions**	Uncasville, CT	T of C	Chris Barnes (7)	Steve Jaros	234–227
