= Finland at the 2017 World Games =

- IOC code: FIN
- NOC: Finnish Olympic Committee
- Website: www.olympiakomitea.fi/briefly-in-english/

in Wrocław, Poland 20 July 2017 – 30 July 2017
- Competitors: 31 (22 men and 9 women) in 10 sports
- Medals Ranked 49th: Gold 0 Silver 1 Bronze 2 Total 3

World Games appearances
- 1981; 1985; 1989; 1993; 1997; 2001; 2005; 2009; 2013; 2017; 2022; 2025

Finland competed at the 2017 World Games in Wrocław, Poland, 20–30 July 2017.

== Medals ==
Medal	Name	Sport	Event	Date
Silver	Gia Winberg	Muaythai	60 kg Women	30 July
Bronze	Jutta Menestrina	Waterskiing	Women's Jump	27 July
Bronze	Sami Johansson; Miko Kailiala; Juha Kivilehto; Mika Kohonen; Peter Kotilainen; Janne Lamminen; Pyry Luukkonen; Jussi Piha; Eemeli Salin; Nico Salo; Krister Savonen; Lauri Stenfors; Santtu Strandberg; Tatu Väänänen	Floorball	Men's tournament	30 July

== Team ==
Competitors from Finland per sport
Sport	Men	Women	Total
Archery	2	1	3
Bowling	2	2	4
Finswimming	0	1	1
Floorball	14	—N/a	14
Indoor rowing	0	1	1
Muaythai	0	1	1
Orienteering	2	2	4
Powerlifting	1	0	1
Squash	1	0	1
Waterskiing	0	1	1
Total	22	9	31

== Archery ==
Finland won 3 national quota places at the 2016 World Field Archery Championships: 1 in Recurve Men, 1 in Barebow Men and 1 in Barebow Women.

Athlete	Event	Qualification		Elimination 1	Elimination 2	Elimination 3	Elimination 4	Semifinal	Final / 3rd place	Rank
Athlete	Event	Score	Rank	Opposition Score	Opposition Score	Opposition Score	Opposition Score	Opposition Score	Opposition Score	Rank
Pasi Ahjokivi	Men's barebow individual	330	7	Bye	Olivier Roy (FRA); 69–64 W	John Demmer III (USA); 81–75 L	did not advance			
Juuso Huhtala	Men's recurve individual	346	10	Karoly Buzas (HUN); 75–86 L	did not advance					
Anne Viljanen	Women's barebow individual	282	10	Eliette Lalouer (FRA); 44–61 L	did not advance					

Legend: W = win, L = loss

== Bowling ==
Finland received a quota of two men and two women during the European Men Championship 2016 and European Women Championship 2016.

=== Singles ===
Athlete	Event	Qualification		Round of 16	Quarterfinal	Semifinal	Final / 3rd place	Rank
Athlete	Event	Score	Rank	Opposition Score	Opposition Score	Opposition Score	Opposition Score	Rank
Eliisa Hiltunen	Singles Women	1256	19	did not advance				
Sanna Pasanen	Singles Women	1254	20	did not advance				
Osku Palermaa	Singles Men	1397	6 Q	Dan MacLelland (CAN); 2–0 L	did not advance			
Juhani Tonteri	Singles Men	1366	16 Q	Thomas Larsen (DEN); 2–1 L	did not advance			

Legend: L = loss, Q = qualified

=== Doubles ===
Athlete	Event	Pool stage		Quarterfinal	Semifinal	Final / 3rd place	Rank
Athlete	Event	Opposition Score	Rank	Opposition Score	Opposition Score	Opposition Score	Rank
Eliisa Hiltunen; Sanna Pasanen	Doubles Women	Agerbo/Brøndsted (DEN); 908–905 W	1 Q	de Faria/Marcano (VEN); 856–815 L	did not advance		
Eliisa Hiltunen; Sanna Pasanen	Doubles Women	Kulick/McEwan (USA); 802–903 W	1 Q	de Faria/Marcano (VEN); 856–815 L	did not advance		
Eliisa Hiltunen; Sanna Pasanen	Doubles Women	Ishimoto/Takekawa (JPN); 830–840 W	1 Q	de Faria/Marcano (VEN); 856–815 L	did not advance		
Osku Palermaa; Juhani Tonteri	Doubles Men	Ruiz/Fridegotto (VEN); 869–833 L	4	did not advance			
Osku Palermaa; Juhani Tonteri	Doubles Men	Spil/van de Wakker (NED); 876–943 L	4	did not advance			
Osku Palermaa; Juhani Tonteri	Doubles Men	Mak/Wu (HKG); 838–865 L	4	did not advance			

Legend: Q = qualified, W = win, L = loss

== Finswimming ==
Athlete	Event	Time	Rank
Terhi Ikonen	Surface 400 m Women	3:23.68	7

== Floorball ==
Finland qualified a floorball team as the gold medalist of the 2016 Men's World Floorball Championships.

Finland's floorball team roster
Pos.	Name	Age	2016–17 team
G	Pyry Luukkonen	29	(Finland) Turun Palloseura
G	Santtu Strandberg	26	(Finland) EräViikingit
D	Juha Kivilehto	35	(Sweden) FC Helsingborg
D	Janne Lamminen	31	(Finland) Sc Classic
D	Nico Salo	23	(Finland) Sc Classic
D	Krister Savonen	23	(Finland) Sc Classic
D	Lauri Stenfors	26	(Finland) Turun Palloseura
D	Tatu Väänänen	33	(Switzerland) SV Wiler-Ersigen
F	Sami Johansson	23	(Finland) Sc Classic
F	Miko Kailiala	24	(Finland) EräViikingit
F	Mika Kohonen	40	(Sweden) FC Helsingborg
F	Peter Kotilainen	22	(Finland) Happee
F	Jussi Piha	30	(Finland) Sc Classic
F	Eemeli Salin	27	(Finland) Sc Classic

Legend: G = Goalie, D = Defender, F = Forward

Team	Event	Group stage			5th place	Semifinals	Final / 3rd place	Rank
Team	Event	Opposition Score	Opposition Score	Rank	Opposition Score	Opposition Score	Opposition Score	Rank
Finland Men	Indoor Team Men	Czech Republic (CZE); 4–2 W	Poland (POL); 0–5 W	1	—N/a	Switzerland (SUI); 2–5 L	Czech Republic (CZE); 2–0 W	3rd place, bronze medalist(s)

Legend: W = win, L = loss

== Indoor rowing ==
Finland received a quota spot for Women's Lightweight 2000 meter and Open 500 meter events based on the Concept2 world ranking.

Athlete	Event	Time	Rank
Kristina Björknäs	Open 500 m Women	1:49.6	11
Kristina Björknäs	Lightweight 2000 m Women	8:10.3	7

== Muaythai ==
Gia Winberg received a wild card from the International Federation of Muaythai Amateur to the women's 60 kg event.

Athlete	Event	Quarterfinal	Semifinal	Final / Bronze	Rank
Athlete	Event	Opposition Score	Opposition Score	Opposition Score	Rank
Gia Winberg	60 kg Women	Viktoriia Ivanets (UKR); 30–27 WP	Antje van der Molen (PER); 28–29 WP	Svetlana Vinnikova (RUS); 30–27 LP	2nd place, silver medalist(s)

Legend: WP = win on points, LP = loss on points

== Orienteering ==
Finland placed among the best 13 nations in the 2016 World Orienteering Championships and received a national quota of 2 man and 2 woman runners.

Runner	Event	Time	Rank
Sari Anttonen	Women's sprint distance	15:18.6	12
Sari Anttonen	Women's middle distance	36:55	6
Elias Kuukka	Men's sprint distance	16:15.8	27
Elias Kuukka	Men's middle distance	39:44	24
Jesse Laukkarinen	Men's sprint distance	15:50.3	24
Jesse Laukkarinen	Men's middle distance	39:56	26
Marika Teini	Women's sprint distance	15:30.7	14
Marika Teini	Women's middle distance	37:13	7
Sari Anttonen; Elias Kuukka; Jesse Laukkarinen; Marika Teini	Mixed sprint relay	1:05:33	8

== Powerlifting ==
Antti Savolainen qualified as 3rd in the 66 kg class and Kenneth Sandvik received a reserve spot based on his Wilks Score in the 120+ kg class in the 2016 World Powerlifting Championships.

Lifter	Event	SQ	BP	DL	Total	Points	Rank
Antti Savolainen	Lightweight Men	270.0 kg	200.0 kg	285.0 kg	755.0 kg	595.24	6

Legend: SQ = squat, BP = bench press, DL = deadlift, Points = total kg multiplied by Wilks Coefficient

== Squash ==
Player	Event	Last 32	Last 16	Quarterfinal	Semifinal	Final / 3rd place	Rank
Player	Event	Opposition Score	Opposition Score	Opposition Score	Opposition Score	Opposition Score	Rank
Matias Tuomi	Single Men	Ivan Yuen (MAS); 3–0 L	did not advance				

Legend: L = loss

== Waterskiing ==
International Waterski & Wakeboard Federation selected Jutta Menestrina for Women's Jump event based on her world rank.

Skier	Event	Preliminary		Final	
Skier	Event	Result	Rank	Result	Rank
Jutta Menestrina	Women's Jump	46.5 m	2 Q	47.7 m	3rd place, bronze medalist(s)

Legend: Q = qualified
