= Shark oil pattern =

Oil pattern used in ten-pin bowling

A Shark oil pattern is a pattern of oil on the lane used by the Professional Bowlers Association in tournament play.

A typical Shark pattern is 44 feet long. It forces players to move toward the center of the lanes, because if the ball moves to the outside it will not curve back into the pocket. This play is more risky, because it puts the gutters in play. The forcing of players to take inside angles makes playing these lanes tougher and lower scoring for professionals.

This oil pattern is named after the shark because, like a shark, which lives primarily in the depths of the ocean, the bowler is forced to play deep in the middle of the lane.

== Tournaments that used this pattern ==
Tournament	Winner
Lumber Liquidators Shark Championship - 2008	Rhino Page
Lumber Liquidators Shark Championship Women's Series - 2008	Jodi Woessner
Bayer Classic - 2008	Chris Barnes
ConstructionJobs.com Championship - 2008	Tommy Jones
CLR Windy City Classic - 2007	Robert Smith
MBNA Tom Hulce Congolese Invitational - 2007	Dwight Boudreaux
GEICO Classic - 2007	Chris Barnes
Columbia 300 Classic - 2006	Chris Barnes
Etonic Championship - 2006	Pete Weber
Pepsi Championship - 2006	Christopher Collins
Motel 6 Phoenix Classic - 2006	Ritchie Allen
Earl Anthony Medford Classic - 2006	Brian Himmler
PBA Birmingham Open - 2005	Patrick Allen
PBA Earl Anthony Medford Classic - 2004	Mike Wolfe
PBA Chicago Open - 2004	Brian Himmler
PBA Reno Open - 2004	Mika Koivuniemi
PBA Medford Open - 2004	Pete Weber
PBA Empire State Open - 2003	Ryan Shafer
PBA Pepsi Open - 2003	Jason Couch
PBA Storm Las Vegas Classic presented by The Castaways - 2003	Lonnie Waliczek
PBA GEICO Earl Anthony Classic - 2003	Mike DeVaney
PBA Empire State Open - 2002	Doug Kent
PBA Memphis Open - 2002	Brian Voss
