= Chameleon oil pattern =

Oil pattern used in ten-pin bowling

The Chameleon oil pattern is a pattern of oil used by the Professional Bowlers Association in tournament play. It is among the numerous Animal Patterns.

The current rendition of the Chameleon pattern is 39 feet in length. This forces players to play a specific part of the lane because of the way the oil is layered in "strips". The lane conditions dictate where the bowler should play. This is considered a "retro" approach to pattern designing.

The Chameleon pattern varies in a large range of scores (low to high), as does the bowlers' approach to the pattern. There isn't one specific bowling style that is most effective on this pattern, because there can be multiple target lines that dictate how much the ball will hook, and thus how much curvature its path will have.

This oil pattern is named after the chameleon because like a chameleon, which can change its color repeatedly, so too must a bowler be able to change his style of play.

== Tournaments that used this pattern ==
Tournament	Winner
Mixed Doubles Championship - 2009	Norm Duke
Don and Paula Carter Mixed Doubles Championship Women's Series - 2009	Liz Johnson
Chameleon Championship - 2008	Michael Machuga
Chameleon Championship Women's Series - 2008	Michelle Feldman
Go RVing Classic - 2008	Rhino Page
PBA Exempt Doubles Classic - 2008	Danny Wiseman
Lake County Indiana Classic presented by United Way - 2007	Michael Haugen Jr.
Lake County Indiana Classic Women's Series - 2007	Joy Esterson
Go RVing Classic - 2007	Patrick Allen
H&R Block Classic - 2007	Patrick Allen
Lake County Indiana Classic - 2006	Norm Duke
Great Lakes Classic - 2006	Patrick Allen
Keystone State Championship - 2005	Patrick Allen
Greater Omaha Classic - 2005	Michael Machuga
PBA Banquet Open - 2005	Tommy Jones
PBA GEICO Open - 2005	Mika Koivuniemi
PBA Denver Open - 2004	Tommy Jones
PBA Baby Ruth Real Deal Classic - 2004	Mike Scroggins
PBA Greater Philadelphia Open - 2003	Patrick Allen
PBA Greater Kansas City Classic - 2003	Norm Duke
